= Korenmarkt, Ghent =

Square in Ghent, Belgium

Coordinates: 51°3′16″N 3°43′19″E

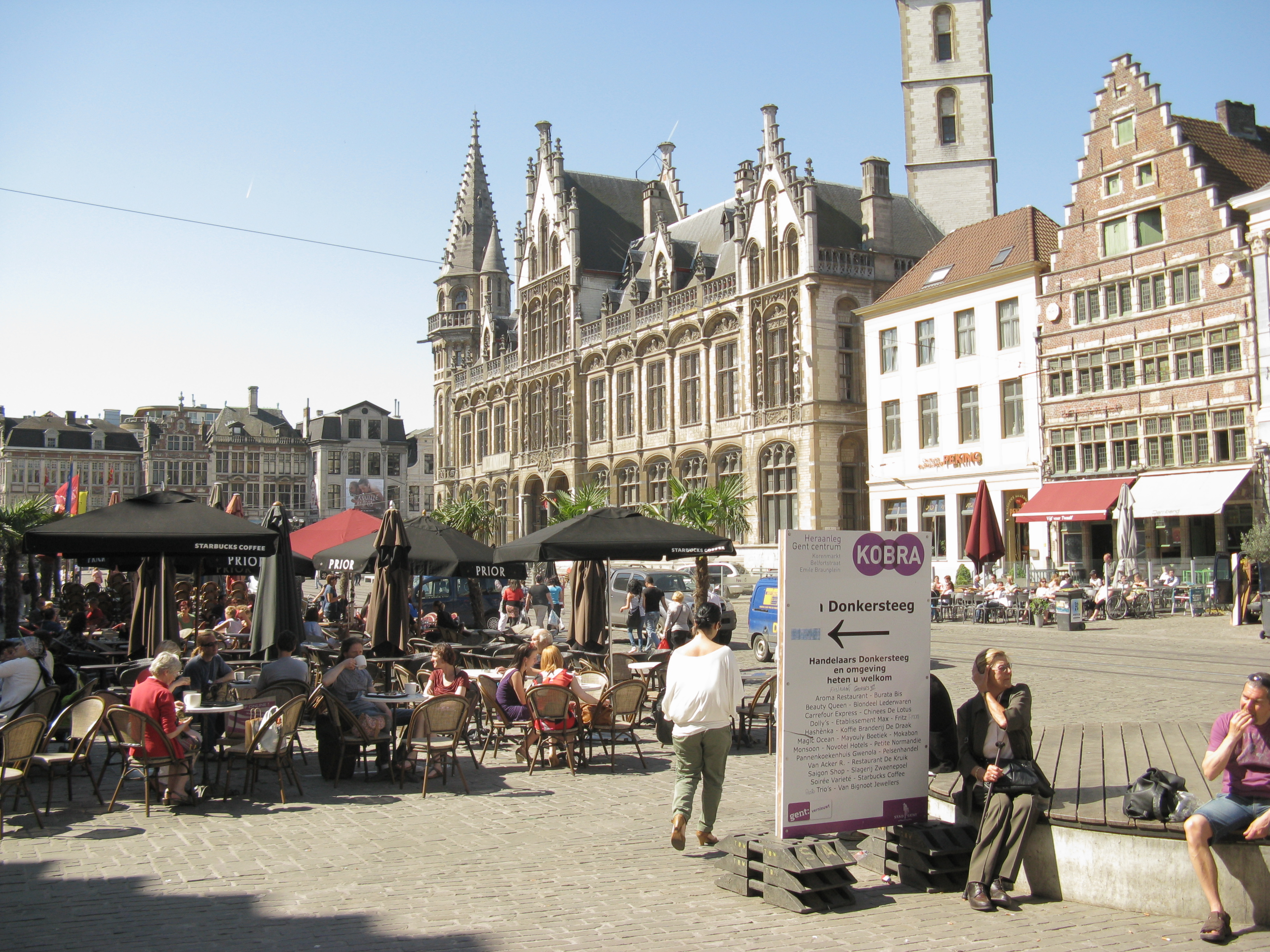
Terraces on the Korenmarkt. Ghent's Old Post Office is shown in the back.

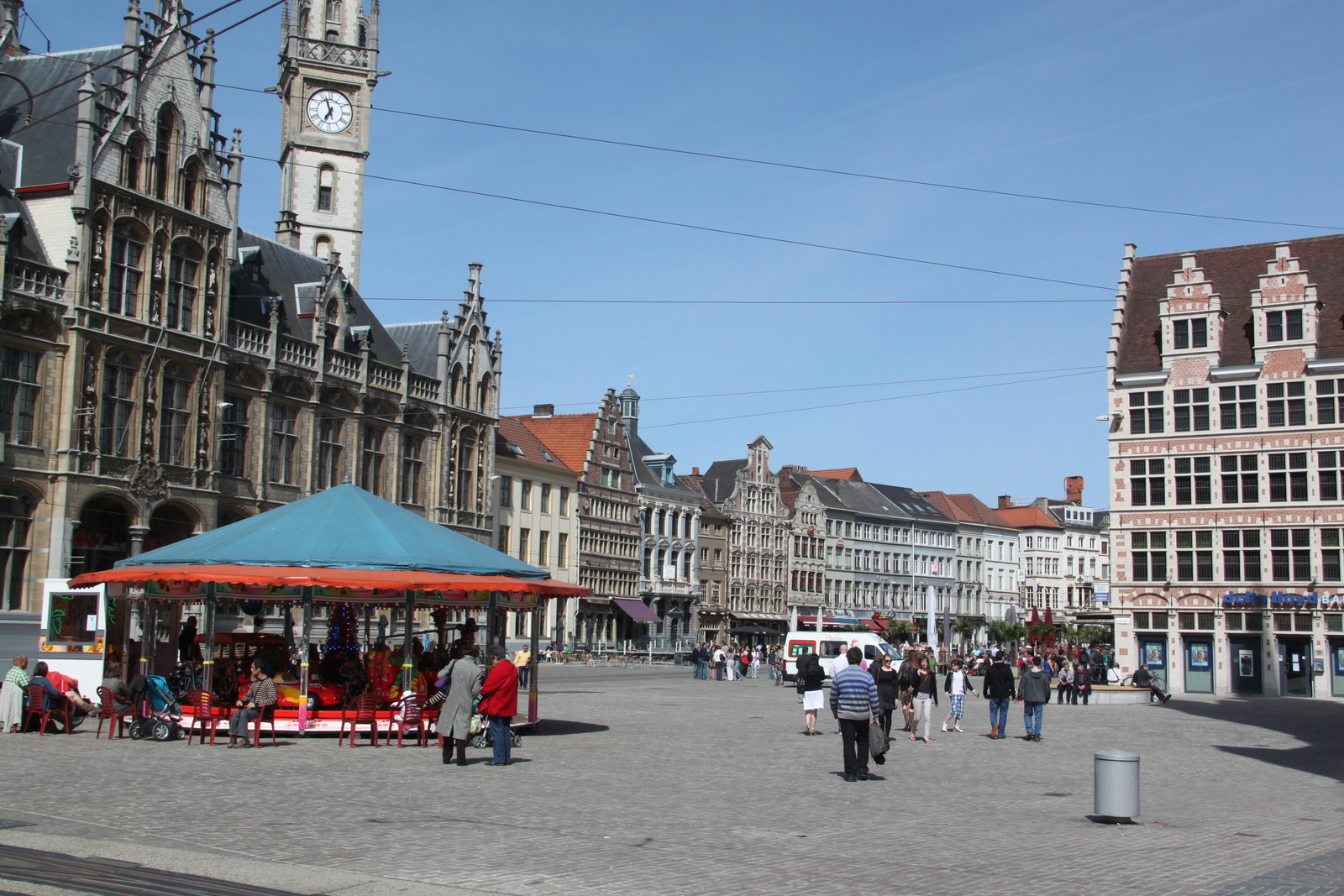
The square from south to north

The Korenmarkt (Dutch pronunciation: [ˈkoːrəmɑr(ə)kt]; "Wheat Market") is a city square in the historic centre of Ghent, East Flanders, Belgium. Located between the Leie river and St. Nicholas' Church, it is one of the city's most important and famous tourist locations. The square is surrounded with several historic buildings, which today house bars, restaurants and terraces. It is a pivotal location of the annual Gentse Feesten cultural festival.

== Location ==
The Korenmarkt connects Ghent's two busiest shopping streets, the Veldstraat and the Kortemunt, from south to north. From west to east, it connects St. Michael's Bridge over the Leie river with St. Nicholas' Church. The western side gives access to the Leie waterfront, notably the Graslei.

== History ==
The square's name is derived from the cereal trade, which dates back to the 10th/11th century when Ghent was the centre of the cereal trade in the County of Flanders. Cereal that was brought into the city via the nearby Graslei and Korenlei by the Leie river, was sold on the market place. The English King Edward III announced his claim to the French crown in this square on 26 January 1340, setting off the Hundred Years’ War.

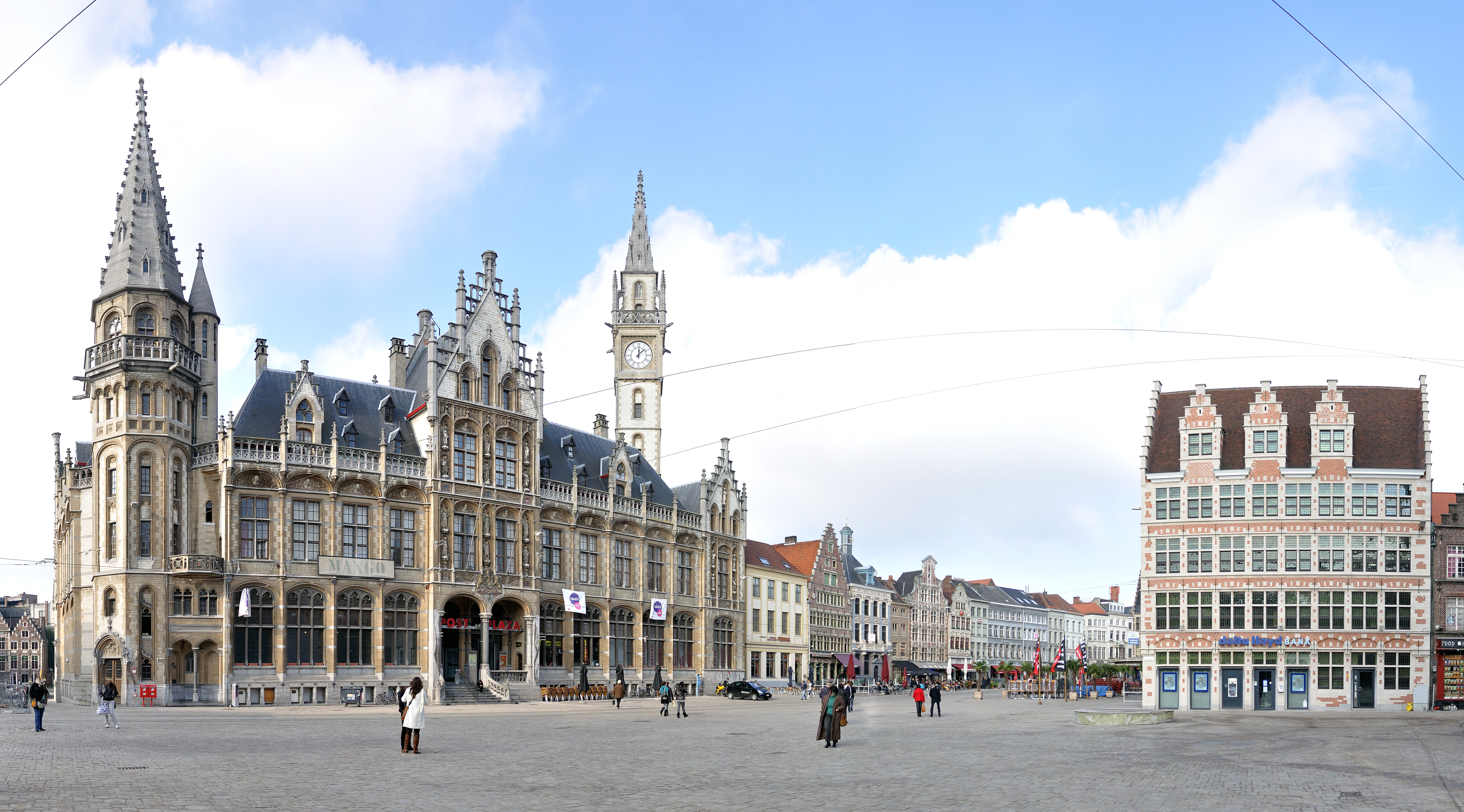
Panoramic view of the Korenmarkt
