= Verboeckhoven =

Verboeckhoven is a Belgian surname. Notable people with the surname include:

- Charles-Louis Verboeckhoven (1802–1889), Belgian painter
- Eugène Joseph Verboeckhoven (1798–1881), Belgian painter
- Marguerite Verboeckhoven (1865–1949), Belgian painter
