= Gentse Feesten =

Music and theatre festival in Ghent, Belgium

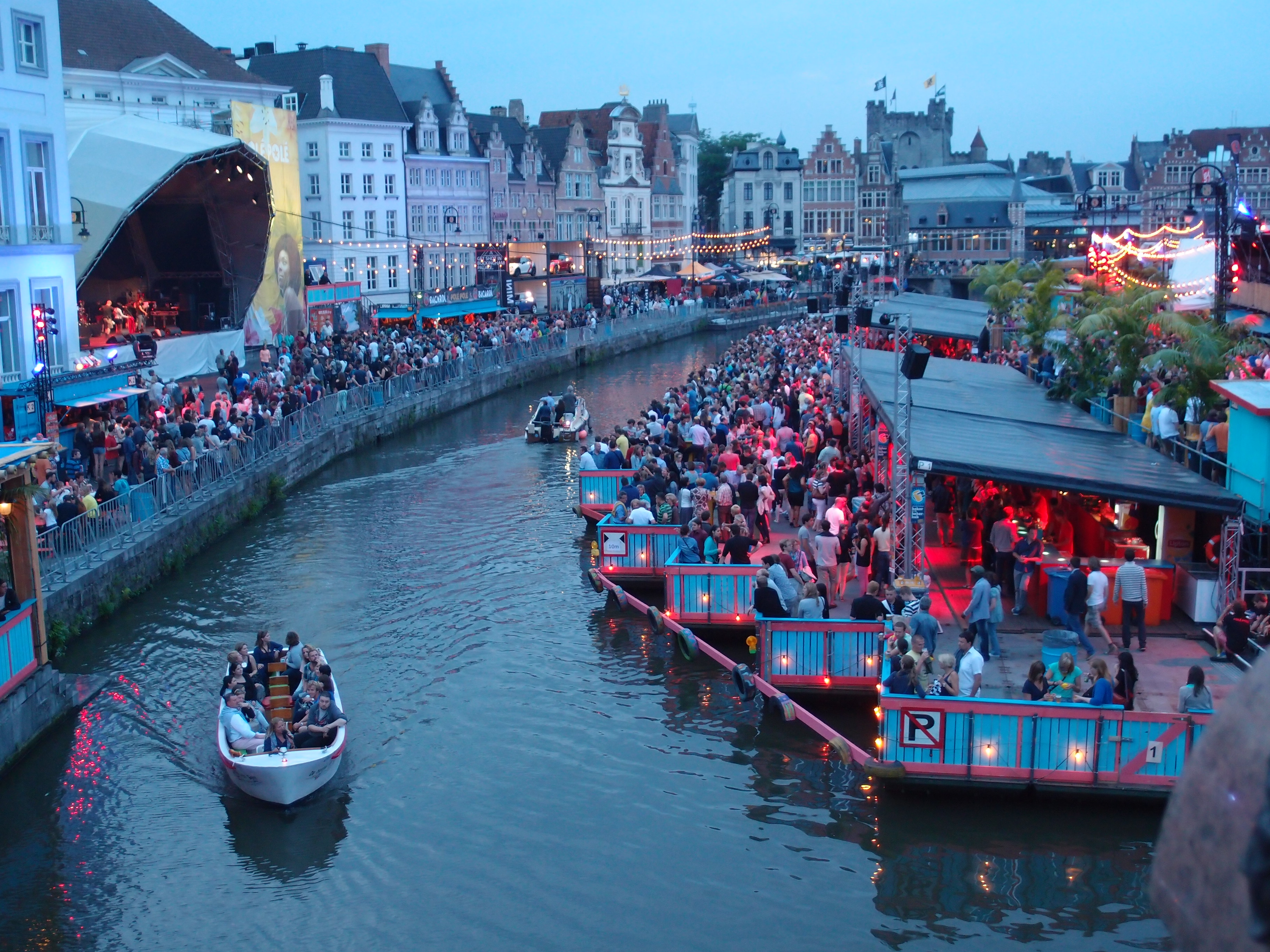
- Gentse Feesten, 4
- Dates: July
- Locations: Ghent, Belgium
- Coordinates: 51°3′N 3°44′E
- Years active: 1969–present (Note: The festival's modern form predates 1969; the first formally recognized festival was held in 1843 with even older medieval precursors.)
- Founders: Walter De Buck, Paula Monsart
- Attendance: 2 million
- Website: Official site

The Gentse Feesten (Dutch pronunciation: [ˈɣɛntsə ˈfeːstə(n)]; in Ghent dialect Gense Fieste; "Ghent Festival") is an annual music and theatre festival in Ghent, Belgium. Besides stage events, there are street acts such as mimes and buskers. It has been held for more than 50 years (since 1969) and is attended by about 1–1.5 million visitors.

== Timing ==
The festival starts on the Friday before the third Sunday of July and lasts until and including the fourth Sunday of July. The date originally had no reference to 21 July, Belgian National Day, but that holiday is always included. The festival starts on "the (Fri)day before the Saturday before 21 July" and lasts ten days.

The last day (until recently always a Monday) is known as de dag van de lege portemonnees ("the day of the empty wallets") alluding to the fact that many people have spent their last penny at the festival and is seen by the people of Ghent as "their" day while visitors leave.

== History ==
The first Gentse Feesten was held in 1843, about 400 people attended. The intensity of the festivities changed throughout the years. The modern Gentse Feesten was started in the summer of 1969 by Ghent singer Walter De Buck and ex-wife Paula Monsart with people from Café Trefpunt.

In the beginning the festival consisted of one stage near the Saint James' Church. Since the late 1980s the festival has grown to now cover the whole inner city of Ghent. Although the festival has become a mass event, it has retained some of the rebellious and anarchistic atmosphere of the early days.

About 2 million visitors attend the festival every year, making it one of the biggest cultural and popular festivals in Europe. The number of visitors on top nights surpasses 250,000. In a 2005 ranking by localfestivities.com, the Gentse Feesten was called the third biggest city festival in Europe, preceded by the Fallas in Valencia and the Oktoberfest in Munich.

The festival did not take place in 2020 and 2021 due to the COVID-19 pandemic in Belgium, being held again in the summer of 2022, after a two-year break.

== Festivals within the Gentse Feesten ==
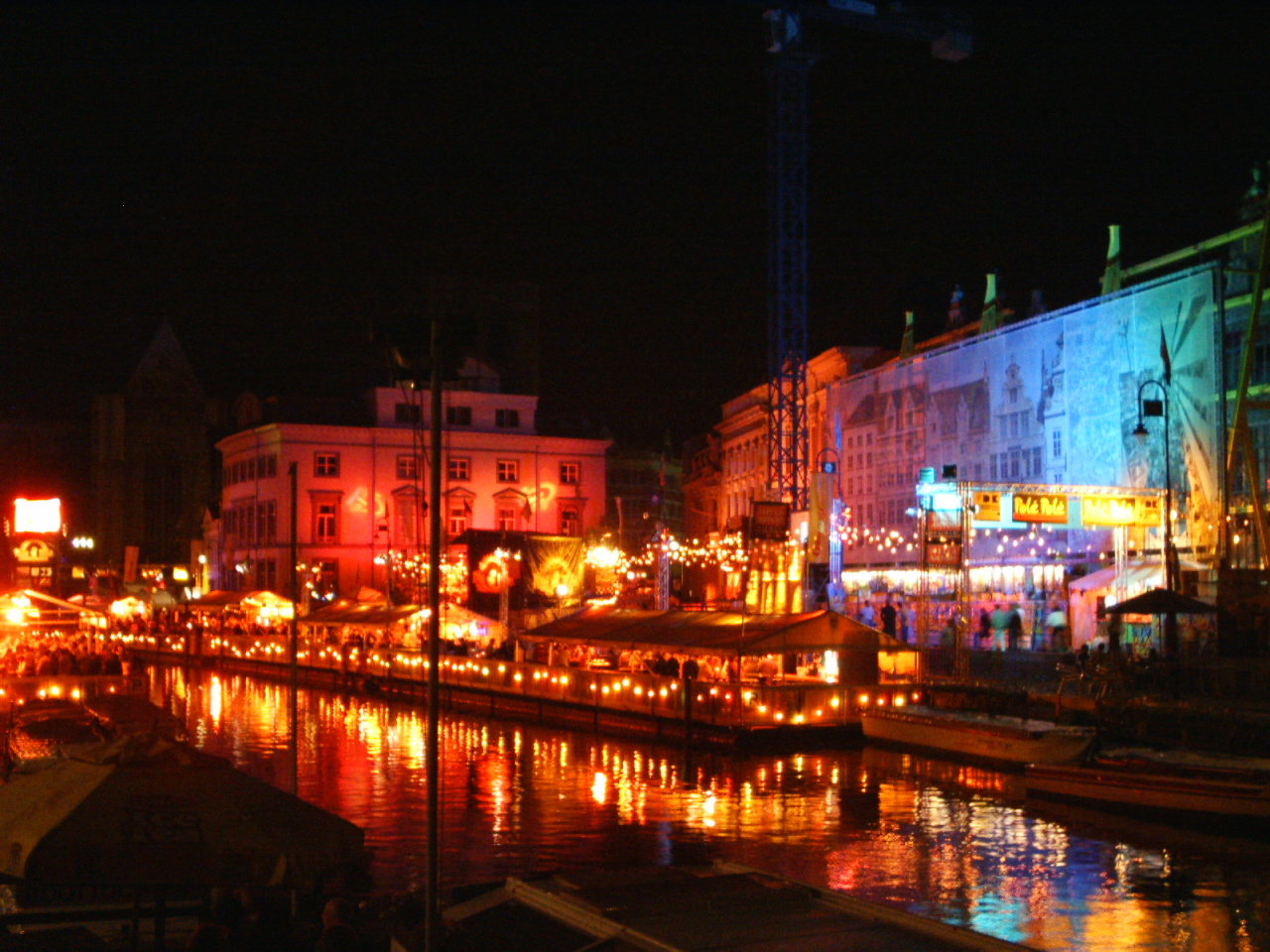
Polé Polé in 2004

Traditionally the shows at the festival have been free, but in later years a number of side festivals have chosen the period of the Gentse Feesten to organize separate events.

- Trefpunt Festival – In the late '60s The Gentse Feesten were reinvented by Trefpunt vzw and Walter De Buck. Since 2011 it has been called Trefpunt Festival with locations around the city centre: Bij Sint Jacobs, Baudelohof, and many others. Every year Trefpunt Festival brings more than 1000 musicians from all over the world who perform more than 200 concerts in blues, rock, funk, soul, jazz, world music, and folk.
- Gent Jazz Festival (formerly Blue Note Festival and Blue Note Records Festival) (since 2002): jazz festival, held at Castle of Counts in its initial years and then moved to the Abbey of Byloke.
- Comedy Festival Gent (since 2007): comedy festival at JOC Rabot, which also hosts a few English-speaking shows.
- International Puppetbuskerfestival: festival for puppeteers spread over the whole city.
- International Street Theater Festival (MiramirO):
- Polé Polé Festival (since 2003): World music at the Korenlei and Graslei.
- Ten Days Off (1995-2014): electronic dance music in the Vooruit. Around 20,000 visitors in 2005. Ten Days Off's final edition was in 2014 and will not return starting 2015.
- Boomtown (since 2002): Alternative music. Originally held at Oude Beestenmarkt. Due to renovations, the event wasn't organized in 2008 and moved to Kouter the year after. The festival would not return to its original square and remained at Kouter.
- Ground Zero Festival (2009): Free no-nonsense music festival in Damberd Jazz-café on the Korenmarkt
- Belgian Summer Sing (since 2008): international choral festival spread over the whole city.
