= Royal Academy of Science, Letters and Fine Arts of Belgium =

Belgian organization

The Royal Academy of Science, Letters and Fine Arts of Belgium (French: Académie royale des sciences, des lettres et des beaux-arts de Belgique [akademi ʁwajal de sjɑ̃s de lɛtʁ e de boz‿aʁ də bɛlʒik], sometimes referred to as La Thérésienne [la teʁezjɛn]) is the independent learned society of science and arts of the French Community of Belgium. One of Belgium's numerous academies, it is the French-speaking counterpart of the Royal Flemish Academy of Belgium for Science and the Arts. In 2001 both academies founded a joint association for the purpose of promoting science and arts on an international level: The Royal Academies for Science and the Arts of Belgium (RASAB). All three institutions are located in the same building, the Academy Palace in Brussels.

== History ==
A preexisting literary society was founded in 1769 under the auspices of Karl von Cobenzl, plenipotentiary of the Austrian Netherlands under Empress Maria Theresa (hence its nickname "La Thérésienne"). In 1772 Cobenzl's successor Georg Adam, Prince of Starhemberg continued the efforts of his predecessor by expanding the society to a scientific academy. This academy was granted the right to bear the title of Imperial and Royal Academy of Science and Letters of Brussels by Empress Letters Patent dated 16 December 1772. The sovereign instructed the academics to animate the intellectual life of the country and to stimulate and coordinate scientific research in a wide variety of fields.

This institution did not survive the occupation by the French of the Austrian Netherlands, and the academy held its last plenary session on 21 May 1794.

William I, king of the United Kingdom of the Netherlands since 1815, reinstituted the academy by Royal Decree of 17 May 1816 on the title of Royal Academy of Sciences and Letters (Koninklijke Academie voor Wetenschappen en Letterkunde). Work was restarted with 8 remaining academics associated with other Dutch and Belgian fellow-members. Its legal personality is recognised by the law of 2 August 1924.

=== Belgian Academy ===
After the 1830 Belgian Revolution, the Academy found its permanent place in the social order and on 1 December 1845 Leopold I of Belgium named it Académie royale des Sciences, des Lettres et des Beaux-Arts de Belgique. He set up three classes: science, letters and fine arts, each with 30 members of Belgian nationality. Confirm Art. 2 the King is Royal Patron, and bestows membership. Founding members included: Nicaise de Keyser, Eugène Simonis, Louis Gallait, Jan August Hendrik Leys, Jean-Baptiste Madou, François-Joseph Navez, Henri van der Haert, Eugène Joseph Verboeckhoven, Gustaf Wappers, Guillaume Geefs, Joseph-Pierre Braemt, Tilman-François Suys, Louis Roelandt, Charles Auguste de Bériot, François-Joseph Fétis, Théodore-Gérard Hanssen and Henri Vieuxtemps.

In 1938, the Koninklijke Academie voor Wetenschappen, Letteren en Schone Kunsten van België was created as an independent solely Dutch-speaking Flemish academy while the Royal Academy of Belgium remained a bilingual institution hosting members both from the north and from the south of the country. The bilingual status of the Royal Academy however caused difficulties over the course of the years, which ultimately were resolved in 1971 by splitting the academy into two independent monolingual entities. The law of 1 July 1971 put both academies in linguistic equality: since then, they each exclusively use their own language (French or Dutch) and they bear the same denomination. In 1999 the Dutch-speaking academy changed its name to "Royal Flemish Academy of Belgium for Science and the Arts" (Koninklijke Vlaamse Academie van België voor Wetenschappen en Kunsten).

== Organization and members ==
The academy is divided into four major classes and assemblies are held monthly:

- Class of Sciences: mathematical, physical, chemical, biological, geological sciences and related disciplines;
- Class of Letters and moral and political sciences: history, archeology, letters, philosophy, moral and political sciences, sociology, economy, law, psychology and economy.
- Class of Arts: painting, architecture and sculpture, music, cinematographic and audiovisual arts, performing arts, history of art, art criticism.
- Class of Technical Sciences: various engineering resulting from sciences, including their impact on society.

Each class is composed of 60 members and 50 associate members, who are foreign members or Belgians residing abroad.

=== Location ===
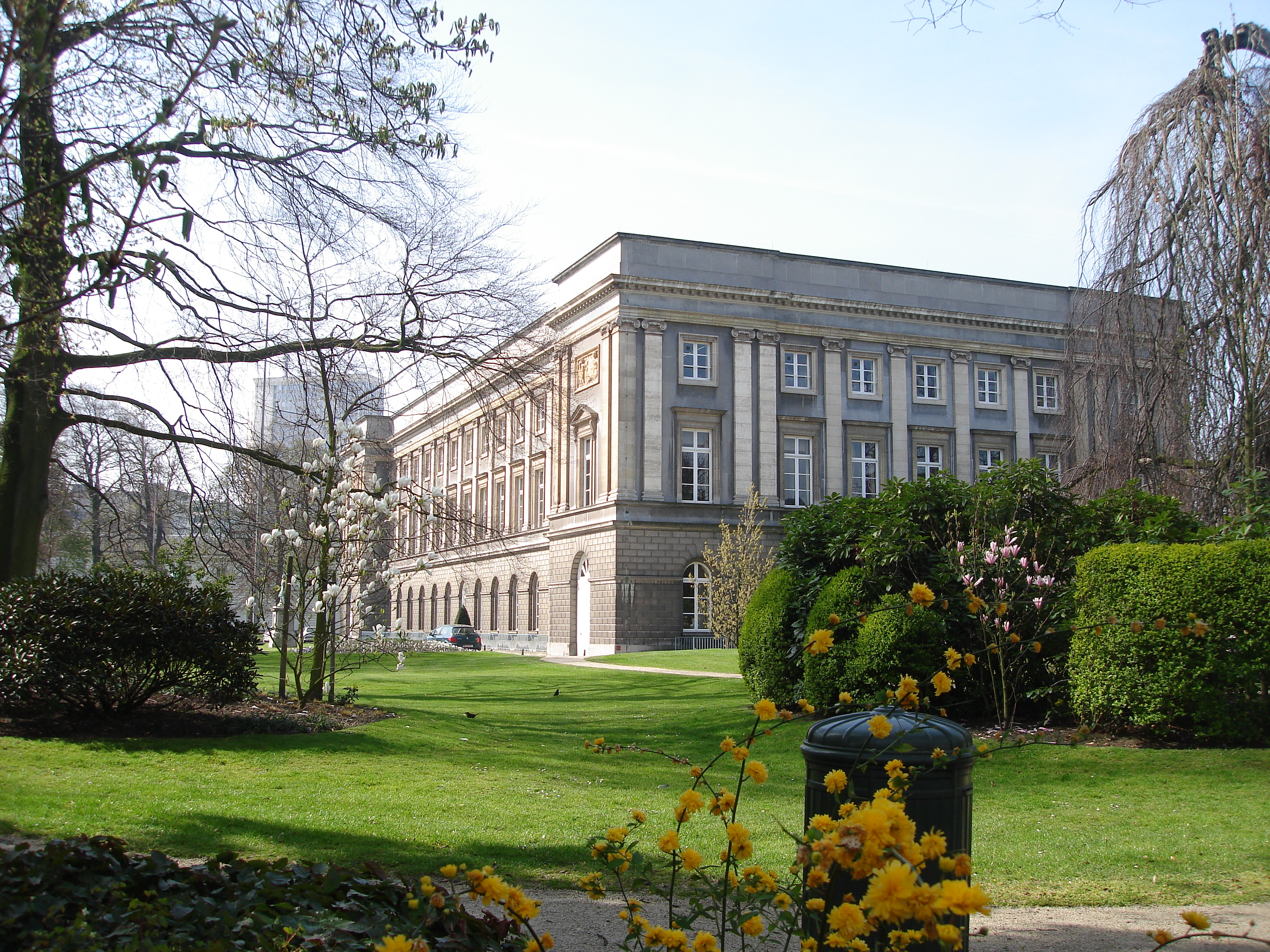
Academy Palace in Brussels

The Academy is headquartered in the Academy Palace, which is on the Rue Ducale/Hertogstraat in Brussels.

Through a royal decree issued on 30 April 1876, the palace was put at the disposal of the two existing French-speaking Belgian academies: the Royal Academy of Science, Letters and Fine Arts of Belgium, which had been founded in 1772, and the Royal Academy of Medicine of Belgium (French: Académie royale de Médecine de Belgique) founded in 1841.

Three further academies came to share the space in the 20th century: the French-speaking Royal Academy of French Language and Literature of Belgium (French: Académie royale de langue et de littérature françaises de Belgique or ARLLFB), founded in 1920; the Dutch-speaking Royal Academy of Science, Letters and Fine Arts of Belgium (Dutch: Koninklijke Academie voor Wetenschappen, Letteren en Schone Kunsten van België), founded in 1938 and called since 1999 the Royal Flemish Academy of Belgium for Science and the Arts (Dutch: Koninklijke Vlaamse Academie van België voor Wetenschappen en Kunsten or KVAB); and the Dutch-speaking Royal Academy of Medicine of Belgium (Dutch: Koninklijke Academie voor Geneeskunde van België), also founded in 1938.

=== Permanent secretaries ===
The lead director is a permanent secretary (secrétaire perpétuel). Since November 2007, the secretary is Hervé Hasquin.

=== Prizes and awards ===
Many scientific and art prizes (fr) are awarded each year in different kinds of subjects.

=== RASAB membership ===
Since its foundation in 2001 the Royal Academy of Science, Letters and Fine Arts of Belgium has been a member of RASAB (the Royal Academies for Science and the Arts of Belgium) – along with its Dutch-speaking sister-academy KVAB – in order to coordinate and promote the 25 National Scientific Committees and the international activities in Belgium.

== Presidents ==
- 1773: Joseph de Crumpipen
- 1816–1820: Baron Guillaume de Feltz
- 1820–1832: Charles-Alexandre, 3rd Prince de Gavre
- 1835: Baron Goswin de Stassart
- 1836
- 1837: Baron Goswin de Stassart
- 1838
- 1839: Baron Goswin de Stassart
- 1840
- 1841: Baron Goswin de Stassart
- 1842
- 1845: Baron Goswin de Stassart
- 1844: Baron Goswin de Stassart
- 1847: Baron Goswin de Stassart
- 1853: Baron Goswin de Stassart
- 1870: Gustave Dewalque
- 1874: Nicaise De Keyser
- 1876: Henri Alexis Brialmont
- 2010: Pierre Bartholomée
- 2016: Charles J. Joachain
- 2017: Monique Mund-Dopchie

== Famous members ==
A full list can be found in the Index biographique des membres et associés de l'Académie royale de Belgique (1769-2005).

Name	Election
André-Marie Ampère	8 October 1825
Pierre Alechinsky	8 January 1987
Auguste Beernaert	8 May 1899
Lennox Berkeley	5 May 1983
Jean Cocteau	1955
Salvador Dalí	6 January 1972
Charles Darwin	15 December 1870
Giorgio de Chirico	3 July 1958
Manuel de Falla	10 January 1935
Paul Delvaux	3 July 1958
Dmitri Shostakovich	1960
Jacques Delors	29 May 1999
Théodore Dubois	5 January 1911
Paul Dukas	8 January 1820
James Ensor	8 January 1825
Erol Gelenbe	15 May 2015
Victor Horta	6 February 1919
Joseph Jongen	1 July 1921
Queen Elisabeth of Belgium	1953
Jules Lismonde	6 May 1982

== See also ==
- Science and technology in Belgium
- Royal Institute for Cultural Heritage
- Culture of Belgium
- Science and technology in Flanders
- Belgian literature
