= Mous Lamrabat =

Belgian photographer of Moroccan–Flemish descent

- Born: Moustapha Lamrabat; 1983 (age 42–43); Temsaman, Morocco
- Education: Royal Academy of Fine Arts (KASK)
- Occupation: Photographer
- Website: mousmous.com

Moustapha "Mous" Lamrabat (born 1983) is a Moroccan-born Belgian photographer, of Moroccan descent, identifying als Flemish-Moroccan. He is known for both fashion photography under Studio Mousmous, and fine art photography.

== Biography ==
Lamrabat was born in Temsaman, northern Morocco; at the age of 2 his family moved to Belgium. He grew up in Sint-Niklaas in a family of nine children.

He studied interior design at Royal Academy of Fine Arts (KASK) in Ghent and graduated in 2009. He is self taught in the field of photography.

In 2019, he had his first solo exhibition Mousganistan, held at the SteM Zwijgershoek museum in Sint-Niklaas. His fine art photography will often highlight his subjects donning niqabs, abayas, and kaftan robes. He creates hybrid images by using Islamic symbols, such as traditional clothing; and pairs it with Western brand iconography and pop culture references.

Lamrabat has worked for Elle, Vogue Italia, Vogue Arabia, GQ Middle East, and Esquire.
