= Omer Coppens =

Belgian impressionist and orientalist artist

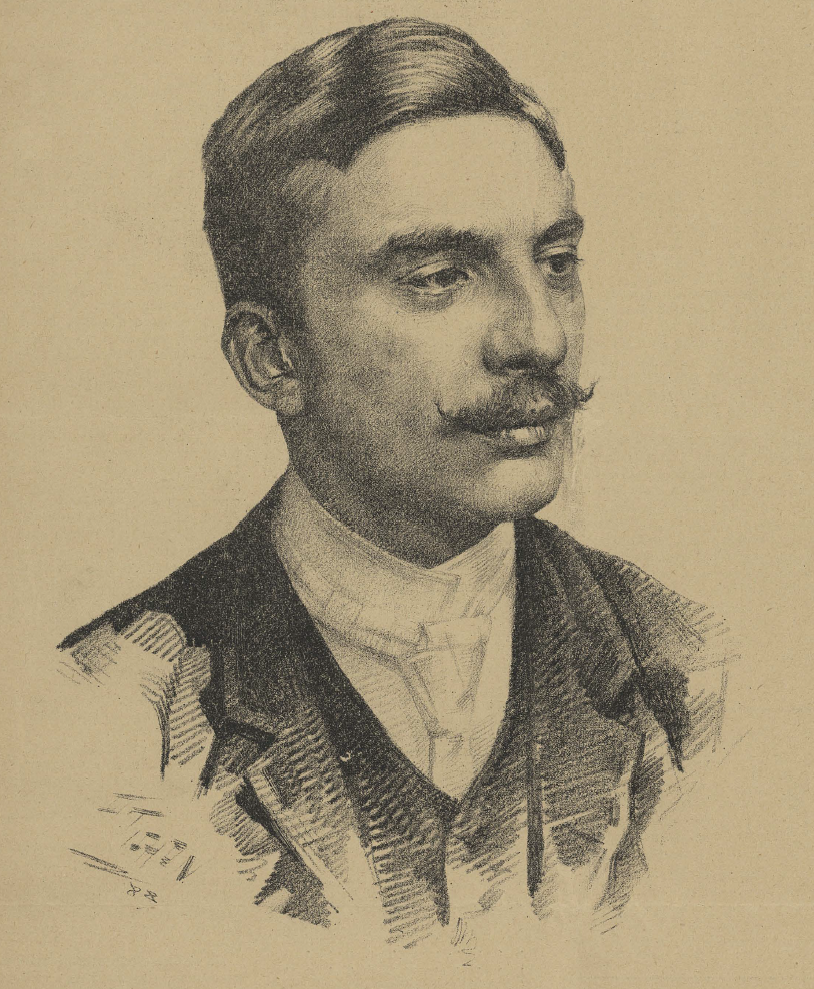
Portrait of Omer Coppens, 1888

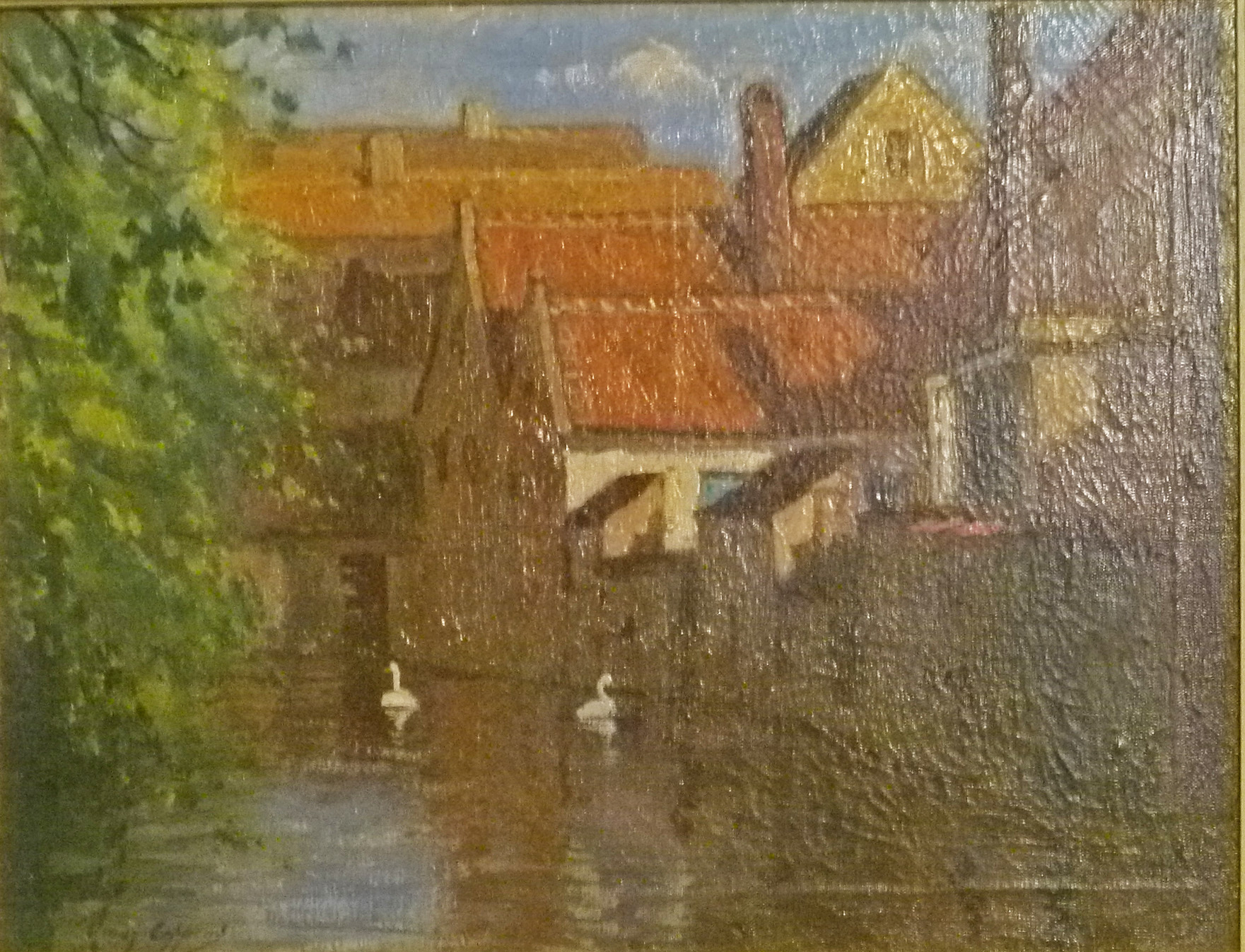
Omer Coppens, Canal at Bruges

Omer Coppens (1864–1926) was a Belgian impressionist and orientalist painter, ceramic artist, and bookbinder.

Born in Dunkirk, Coppens studied art at the Royal Academy of Fine Arts at Ghent and worked in the south of France, Italy, and Morocco, painting genre scenes, seascapes, and landscapes.

Taking an interest in ceramic art, in about 1894 and 1895 Coppens is believed to have spent time in workshops at Torhout and Bredene. He taught Arthur Craco, who produced his first ceramics in the workshop of Coppens.

Seeking the true use of light, the realist brushstrokes of Coppens's early work developed into a more autochthonous Impressionism, under the influence of the work of his friend Théo van Rysselberghe, who painted at least one portrait of Coppens in oils. Coppens became the secretary of a group called Pour l'Art and was also a member of l'Essor and the Cercle artistique et littéraire de Bruxelles.

In 1898, The Magazine of Art noted that "Coppens loves and depicts moonlit scenes, where the whiteness of the houses is tempered with a greenish blue."

Influenced by Art Nouveau, Coppens is best known as a painter, engraver, and ceramic artist, but he also worked in pewter and was a bookbinder.

Coppens took part in the Brussels Universal Exhibition of 1910. His son, Willy Coppens (1892–1986), became a famous aviator in the First World War.

Coppens died in 1926 in Ixelles. In an obituary, The Connoisseur called him "the earnest interpreter of the urban scene" and reported that he had been one of the best-known members of Pour l’Art.

In 2001, the Rouge-Cloître Art Centre in Brussels mounted an exhibition entitled "Omer Coppens or the Dream of Art Nouveau", in collaboration with the Free University of Brussels, the Royal Museums of Art and History, the Horta Museum, and the International Centre for the Study of the 19th century.
