= Walter De Buck =

- Walter De Buck in 2012

Background information
- Born: Walter De Buck; 13 July 1934; Ghent, Belgium
- Died: 21 December 2014 (aged 80) Ghent, Belgium
- Genres: Folk music
- Occupations: Singer, sculptor
- Instrument: Vocals
- Years active: 1958–2014

Walter De Buck (13 July 1934 – 21 December 2014) was a Belgian singer, sculptor and the founder of the modern Gentse Feesten (Ghent Festival).

== Biography ==
De Buck was born in Ghent in 1934. He studied at the Royal Academy of Fine Arts in Ghent, where he graduated in 1954 magna cum laude. De Buck made his debut as a sculptor at the 1958 World’s Fair and was awarded several prizes for his sculptures. In 1962 he founded the non-profit organisation Trefpunt, with which he restarted the Gentse Feesten in 1969.

As a musician, De Buck made a name as a singer and writer of folk music with the song 't Vliegerke, released in 1971. In 1986 De Buck retired from Trefpunt to focus on his sculpture work. De Buck felt he would only stop being creative when he died.

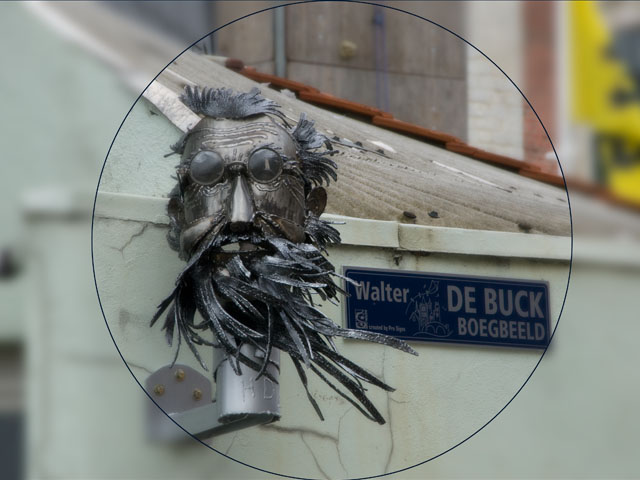
2007 artwork representing De Buck by Henri De Bruyn

De Buck died on 21 December 2014 in Ghent from the effects of esophageal cancer, having previously been diagnosed with Alzheimer's disease.

De Buck was posthumously honored in 2017 by the city of Ghent, which renamed part of Bij Sint-Jacobs square as Walter De Buckplein in his honor. This was the location where the Gentse Feesten had been restarted in 1969.
