= Pieter-Frans De Noter =

Flemish painter (1779–1842)

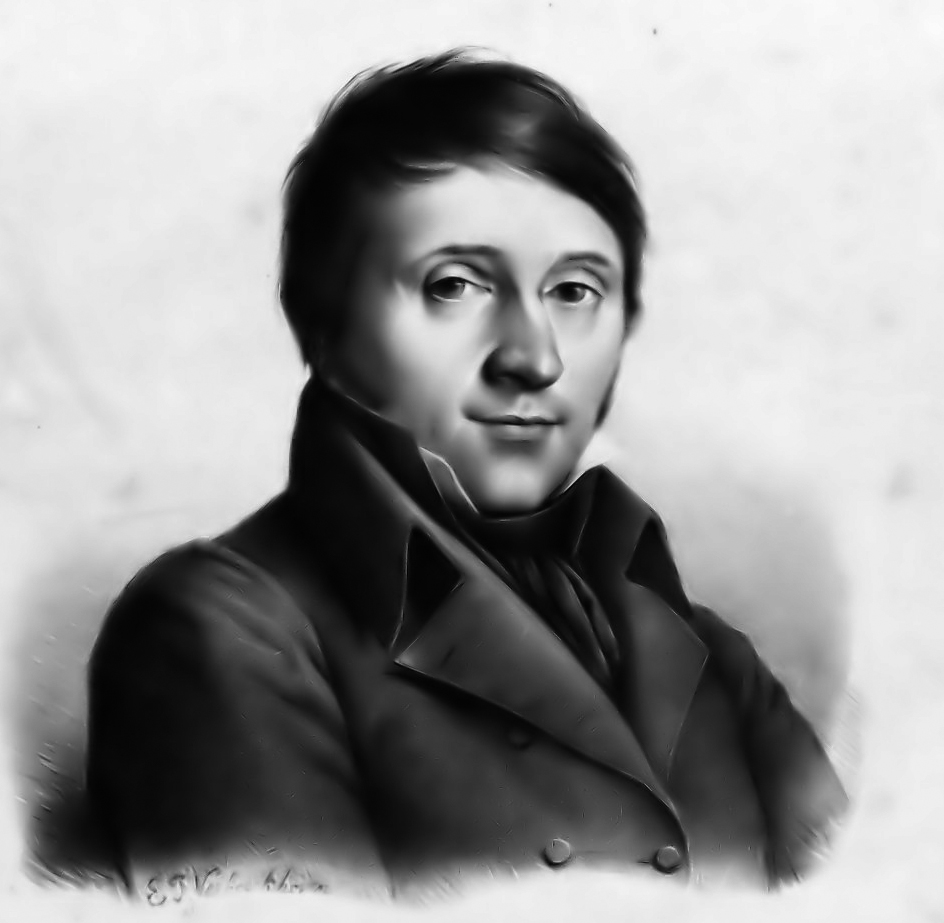
Pieter Frans de Noter by Eugène Joseph Verboeckhoven

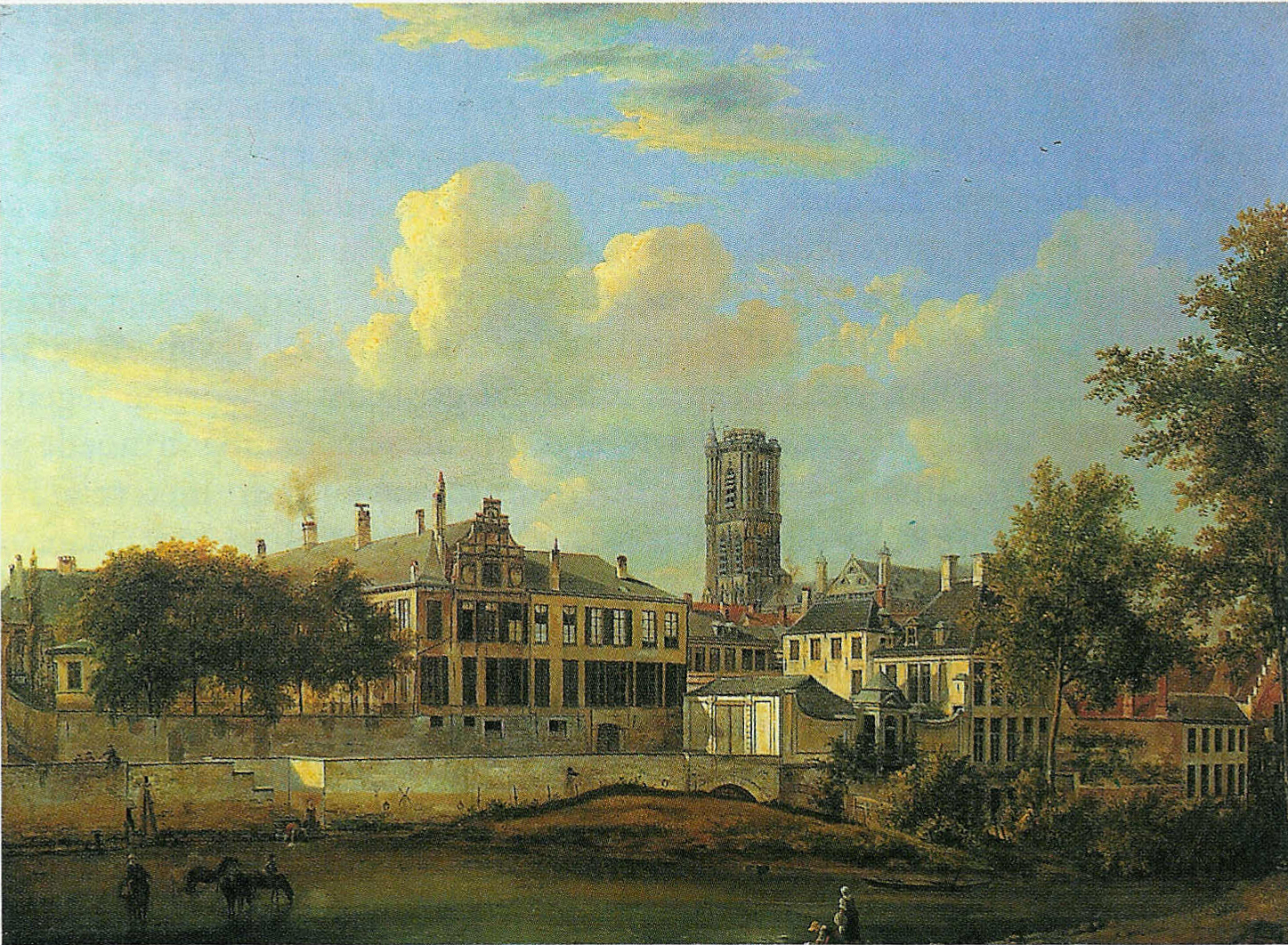
Ghent, episcopal palace, 1819

Pieter-Frans De Noter (23 February 1779, Walen, near Mechelen – 21 November 1842, Ghent) was a Flemish painter of landscapes and interiors.

== Life and works ==
He became a professor in the Royal Academy of Fine Arts in Ghent and developed into an eminent painter of landscapes, marine subjects, winter scenes, views of the interiors of cities, and cathedrals. His most esteemed pictures are his views of cities and winter scenes; and during the latter part of his career he confined his talents almost exclusively to the representation of such subjects.

His pencilling was delicate; and in this respect he may be considered as belonging to the Dutch school. His pictures are numerous and varied, and are to be found in the cabinets of Belgium, Holland, and the north of France. He also engraved a collection of landscapes, several of which are after Hobbema.

Among his minutely detailed works are View at Bruges, View from Pont Neuf, Ghent, Abbey of St. Pierre, Ghent and Winter view of Ghent.

== Works ==
- Noter, P.F. De (1831). Recueil de gravures à l'eau forte, dont plusieurs d'après Hobbema. Ghent: self-published – via Google Books.
