= Joseph-Pierre Braemt =

Belgian engraver and medalist (1796–1864)

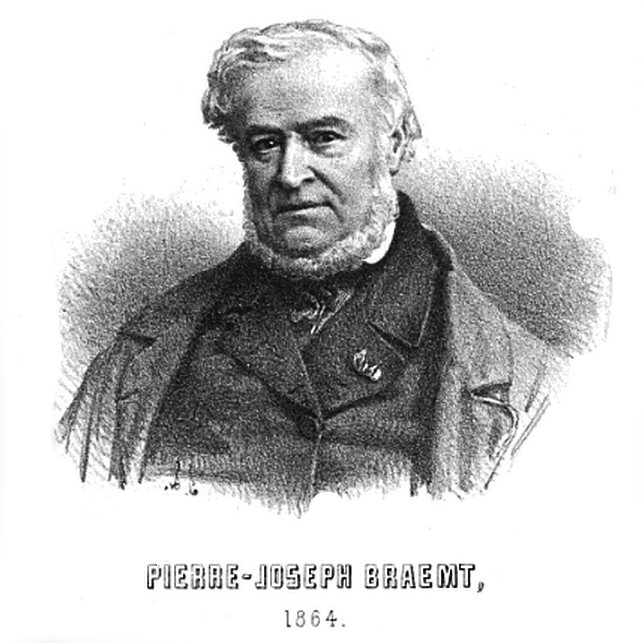
- Born: 15 June 1796; Ghent, French First Republic
- Died: 2 December 1864 (aged 68); Brussels, Belgium
- Education: Royal Academy of Fine Arts (KASK); Académie Royale des Beaux-Arts
- Occupation: Medalist

Joseph-Pierre Braemt (15 June 1796 – 2 December 1864) was a Belgian medalist and coin designer.

== Biography ==
After training at the academies of Ghent and then Brussels, Joseph-Pierre Braemt perfected his craft in Paris with the engraver André Galle and Baron François Joseph Bosio, a renowned sculptor of the time.

He was appointed general engraver of the Hôtel des Monnaies in Brussels and produced the first Belgian coins.

He was a founding member of the Royal Academy of Science, Letters and Fine Arts of Belgium.

== Works ==
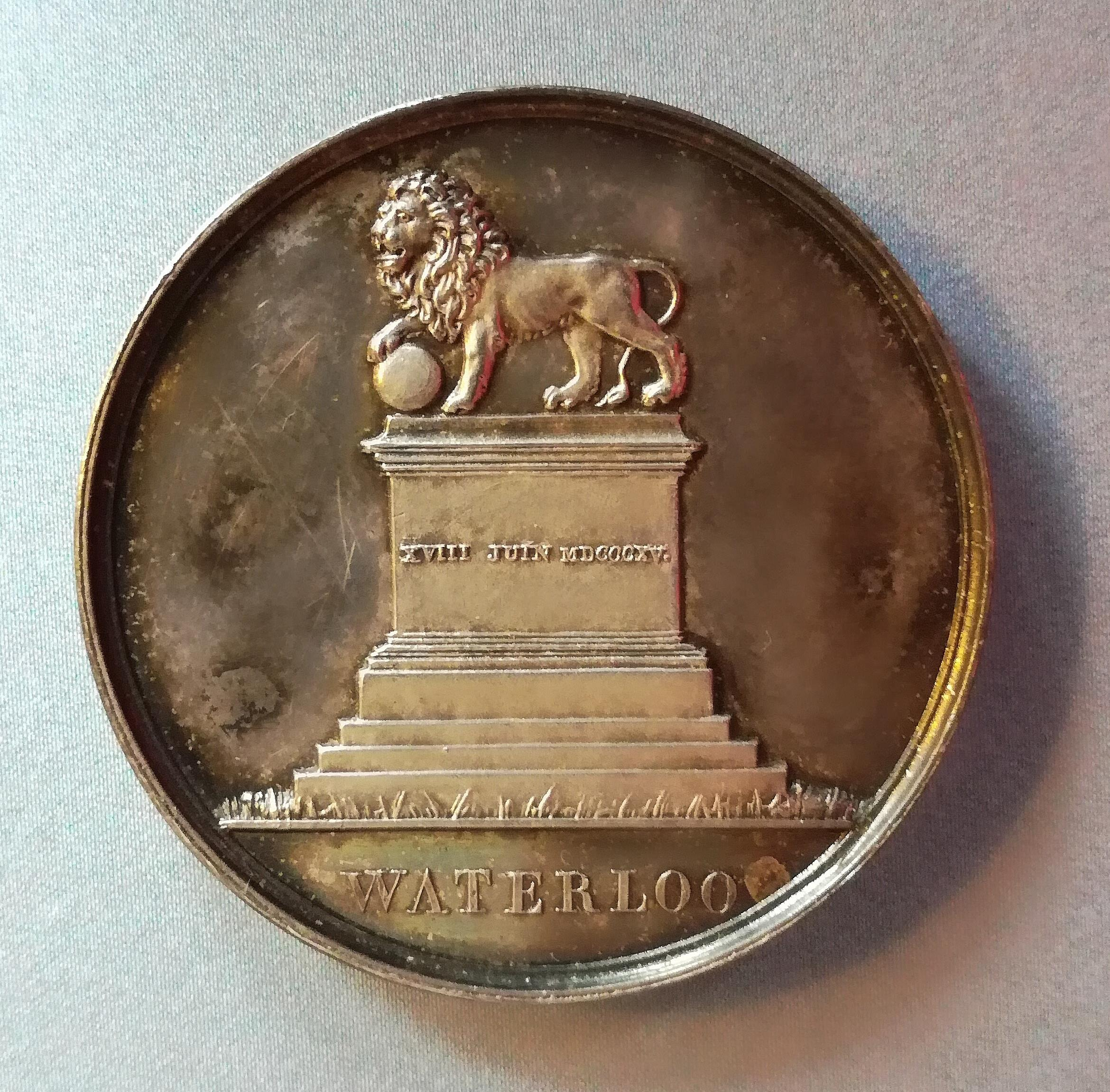
Waterloo medal by Braemt

His work includes the following:

- 1826 : medal commemorating the completion of the digging of a canal between the Haine and the Escaut, under the government of the Kingdom of the Netherlands,
- 1830 : medal of recognition to the Garde civique, under the Provisional Government of Belgium,
- Starting in 1832 :
  - silver franc coins with the portrait of King Leopold I (5 silver francs, 2 1/2 silver francs, 2 silver francs, 1 silver franc, 1/2 silver franc, 1/4 silver franc, 20 centimes silver),
  - copper pennies with the Belgian lion and the national motto, in French, "l'union fait la force" (10 cents, 5 cents, 2 cents and 1 penny).

== Legacy ==
A street in the municipality of Saint-Josse-ten-Noode, where he owned a large property called "Campagne de M. Braemt" (Mr Braem's countryside), on which the street was partly drawn, bears his name.

== Bibliography ==
- De Seyn, Dictionnaire biographique...., vol. I, sub verbo.
- L. Forrer, Biographical Dictionary of Medallists : Braemt, Joseph Pierre, t. I, London, Spink & Son Ltd, 1904, 691 p., p. 260–261.
