= Roger Wittevrongel =

Belgian draughtsman, graphic artist, painter (born 1933)

- Born: April 23, 1933 (age 92); Blankenberge
- Occupations: Painter; draughtsman; graphic artist

Roger Wittevrongel (born 23 April 1933) is a Belgian painter, draughtsman and graphic artist, representative of the hyperrealism.

Wittevrongel was born in Blankenberge, Belgium. He received his education in Ghent, where he combined his studies at the Royal Academy of Fine Arts (KASK) (1953-1956) with a teacher training in plastic arts in the State School (1954-1956) under the guidance of Octave Landuyt.

From 1956 up to 1971, he worked as a teacher in plastic arts at the State School in Ghent. Consequently, he was professor etching, drawing and lithography at the Royal Academy for Fine Arts in Ghent until 1997, where he got the title of honorary professor since then.

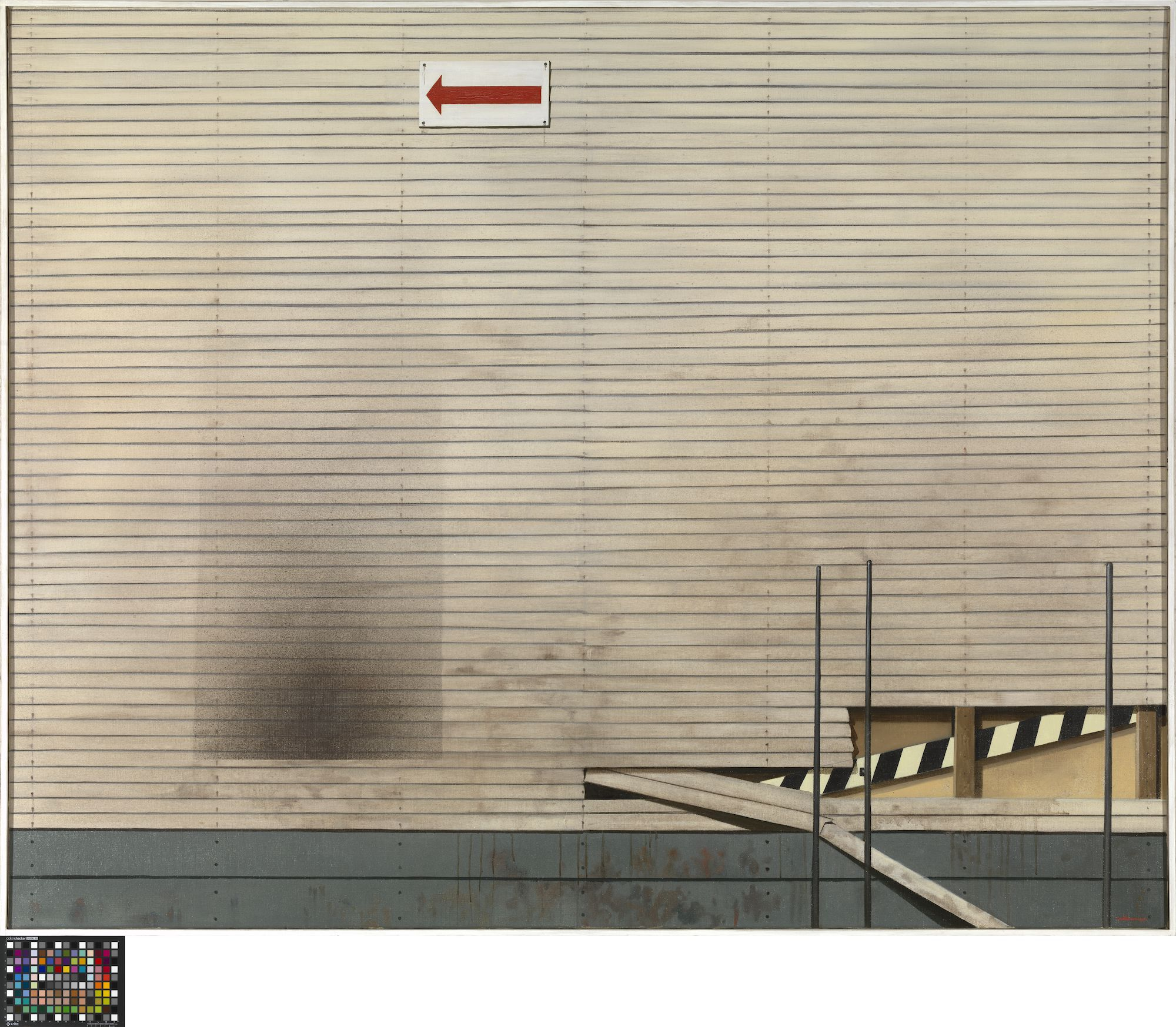
7 Monroestreet Washington DC in Museum van Deinze en de Leiestreek

In 1954, Wittevrongel made his debut in the atmosphere of Octave Landuyt, yet more in an abstract way, with work around destruction, devastation and animal heads. Around 1964, he started to paint more figuratively, mainly architectural compositions decorated with vegetable elements and female nudes surrounded by a wide range of attributes (for example painting and drawing tools). Around 1970 he comes to a hyperrealistic style with an absolute accuracy in the reproduction of what the eye could see. However, he continued to evolve within this style and concentrated on trivial subjects, which he also depicted with the greatest precision. The subjects themselves - interiors, fragments of architecture and female characters, are treated as still-lives, which gives them an abstract quality. These works in particular raise questions concerning man's relationship with visible reality. Here the astonishment is less evoked by the technical virtuosity but more by the question of the meaning of existence.

Roger Wittevrongel exhibits since 1954 in Belgium, the Netherlands, Germany, France, Great Britain, Italy, Sweden, Switzerland, Japan, Morocco, Brazil, Tunisia, the United States, Canada, South Africa, Taiwan.

Prizes

- Mention Young Belgian Painting Award in 1958, 1960, 1963
- Provincial painting prize of West Flanders in 1960
- Critics prize in 1979 and 1981
- E. Van Marcke prize in 1981
- State prize in recognition of an artistic career in 1984

At present he lives in Bachte-Maria-Leerne near the Lys, close to Deinze in the province of East Flanders in Belgium.
