= Monique Mund-Dopchie =

Belgian classicist

Monique Mund-Dopchie (born in Ronse, Belgium, on 21 August 1943) is a Belgian classicist. She is the current president of the Royal Academy of Science, Letters and Fine Arts of Belgium.

In 1970, Mund-Dopchie obtained a doctorate in Classical Philology. She went on to work as a professor of Ancient Greek Literature and of the History of Humanism in the Philosophy Department of the Université Catholique de Louvain. In 2008 she became professor emeritus. After her retirement a Festschrift was presented to her jointly with Gilbert Tournoy, relating to her work on Neo-Latin Renaissance literature: Syntagmatia: Essays on Neo-Latin Literature in Honour of Monique Mund-Dopchie and Gilbert Tournoy, edited by Dirk Sacré and Jan Papy (Leuven University Press, 2009)

In 2000, she was elected a corresponding member of the Royal Academy of Belgium, and in 2004 a full member. Since January 2017, she has been president of the academy.

== Honours ==
- 1965: fellow of the Belgian Historical Institute in Rome.
- 1972: fellow of the British Council.
- 1974: fellow of the "Bourse Claire Préaux".
- 2004: Member of the Royal Academy of Science, Letters and Fine Arts of Belgium, (Letters Class)
- 2006: Grand Officer in the Order of the Crown.
- 2017: President of the Royal Academy of Science, Letters and Fine Arts of Belgium

== Publications ==
- Le premier travail français sur Eschyle: le Prométhée enchaîné de Jean Dorat (Université catholique de Louvain, 1976)
- La survie d'Eschyle à la Renaissance: éditions, traductions, commentaires et imitations (Peeters, 1984)
- Les survivants de l’âge d’or. Les pays des confins dans l’imaginaire grec avec un aperçu de leur survie dans la culture occidentale (Louvain-la-Neuve, 2001) ISBN 9782874190001
- Ultima Thulé: Histoire d'un lieu et genèse d'un mythe (Geneva, 2009), ISBN 9782600012348
- L’Atlantide de Platon: Histoire vraie ou préfiguration de l’Utopie de Thomas More? (Académie royale de Belgique, 2017) ISBN 9782803105885
