= Charles-Louis Verboeckhoven =

Belgian Romantic painter (1802–1889)

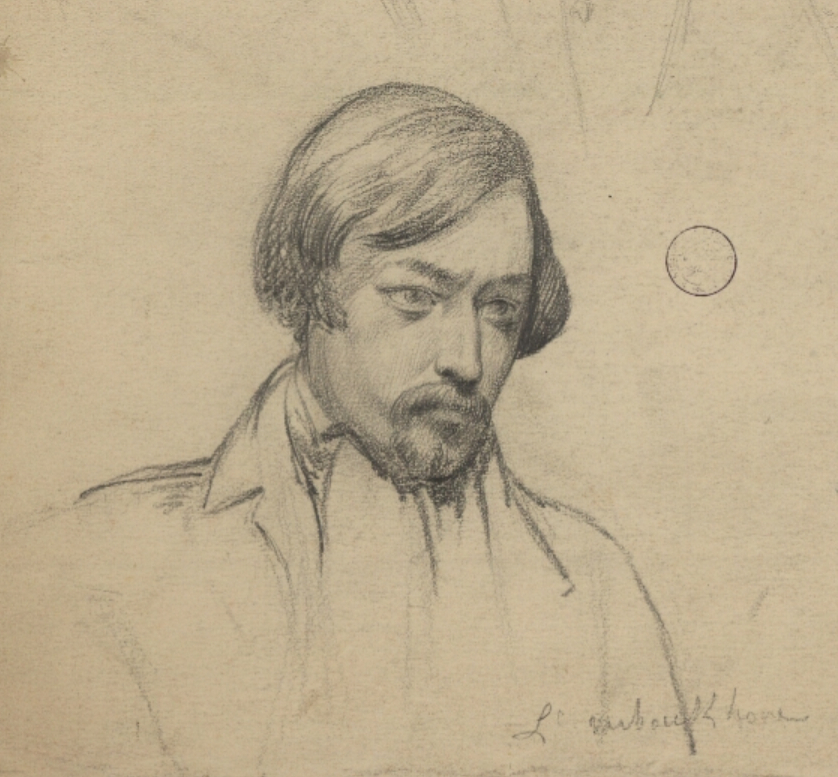
- Portrait by Xavier de Cock, 1830 - 1850
- Born: Charles-Louis Verboeckhoven; 5 February 1802; Comines-Warneton
- Died: 25 September 1889 (aged 87); Brussels, Belgium
- Occupation: Painter
- Relatives: Barthélemy Verboeckhoven (father) Eugène (brother)

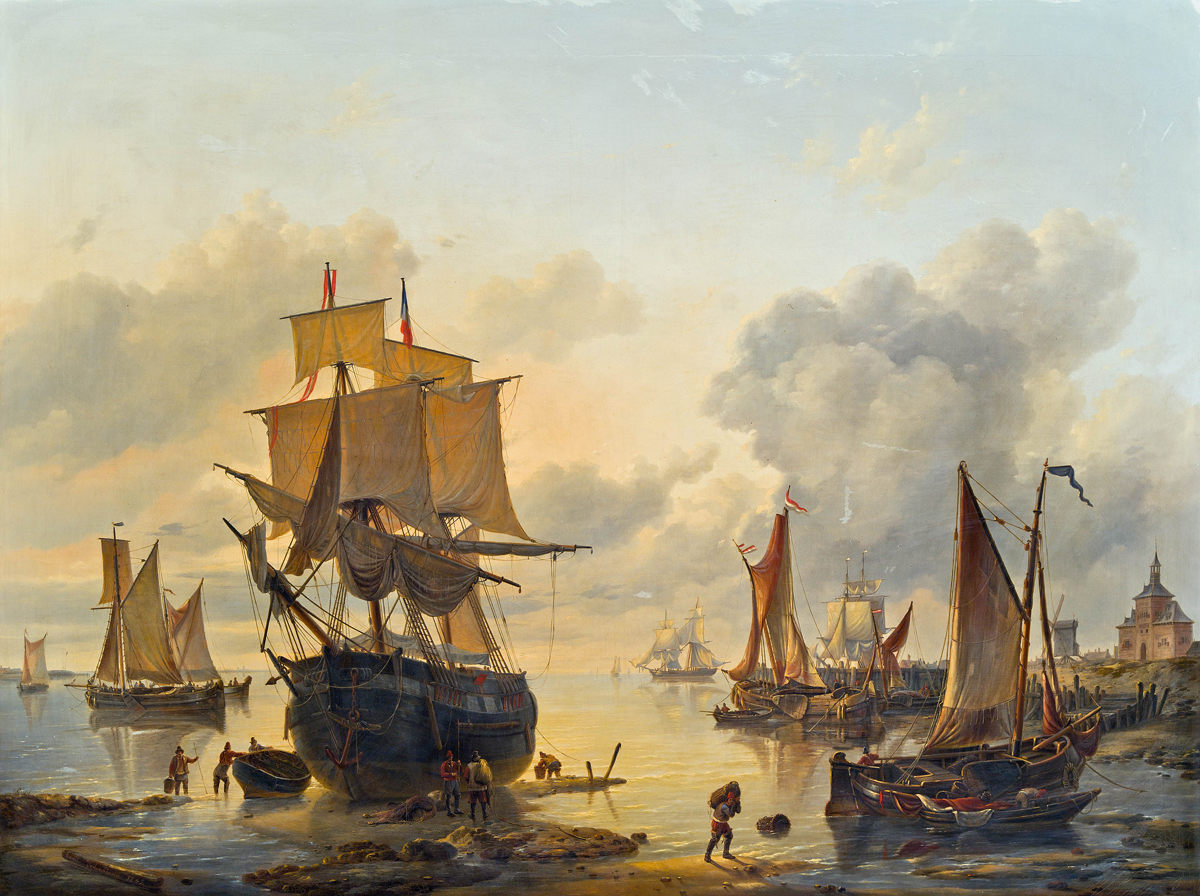
Dutch Harbor Scene

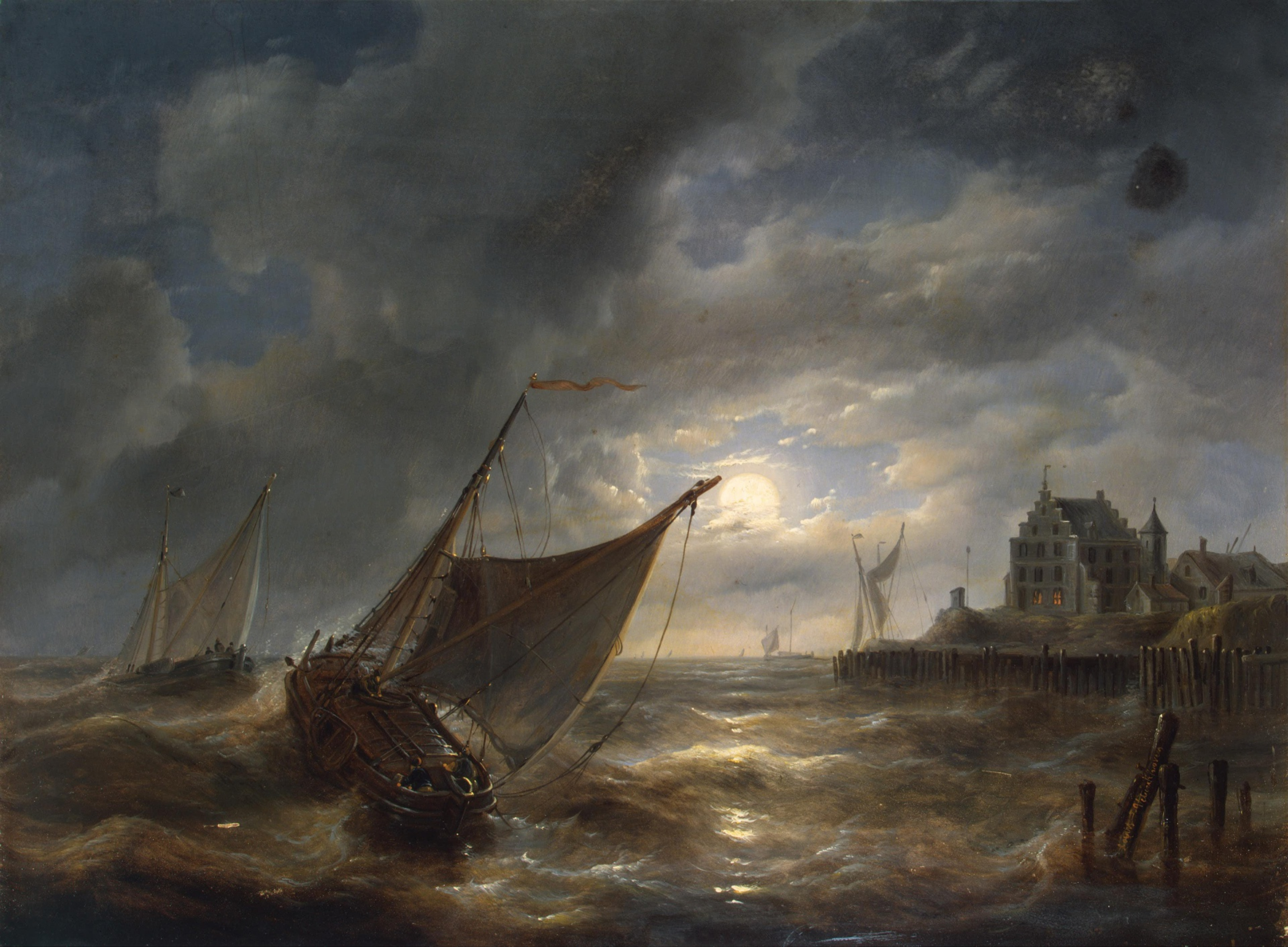
Harbor by Night

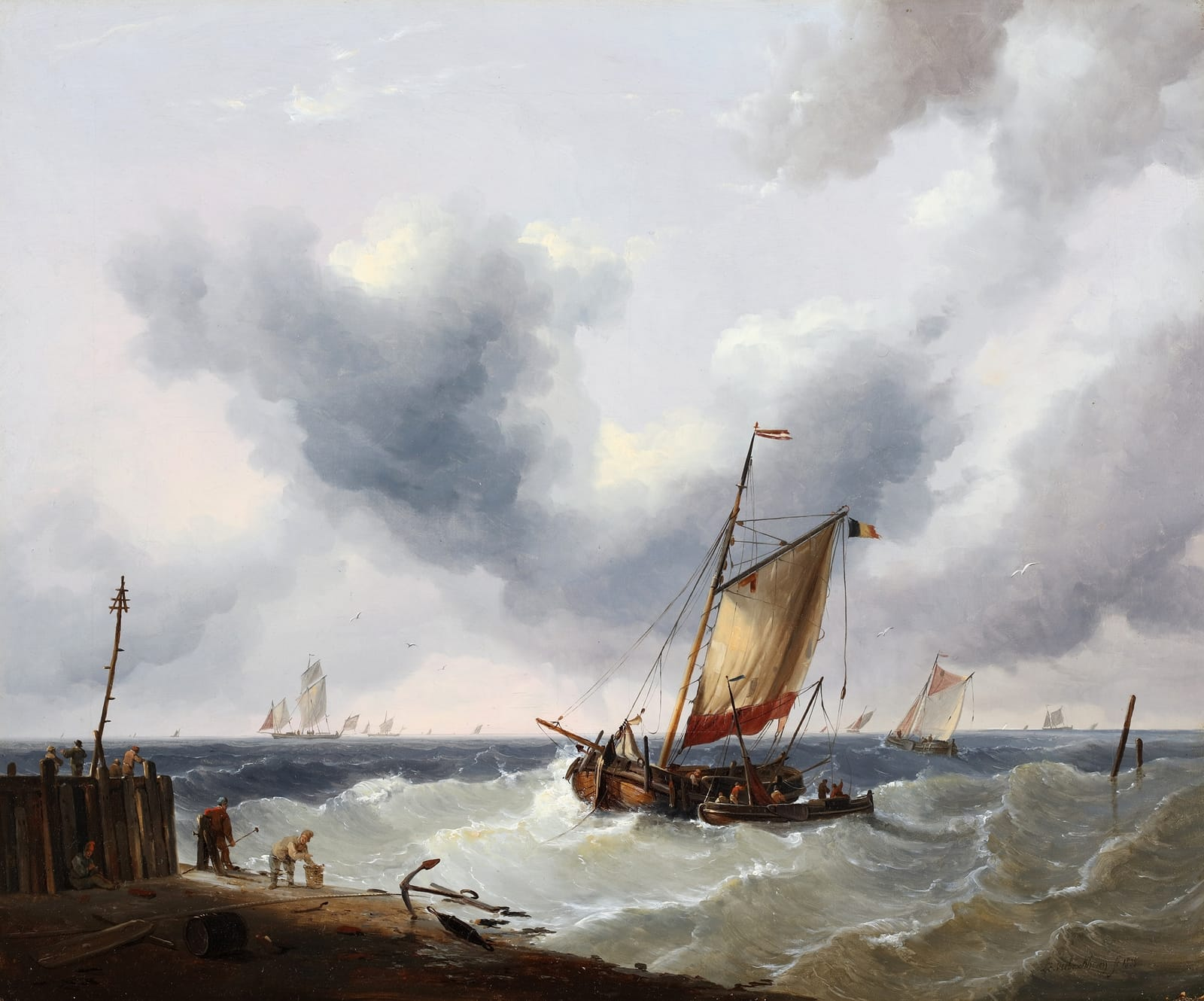
Ships near the shore, (1835) (German collection)

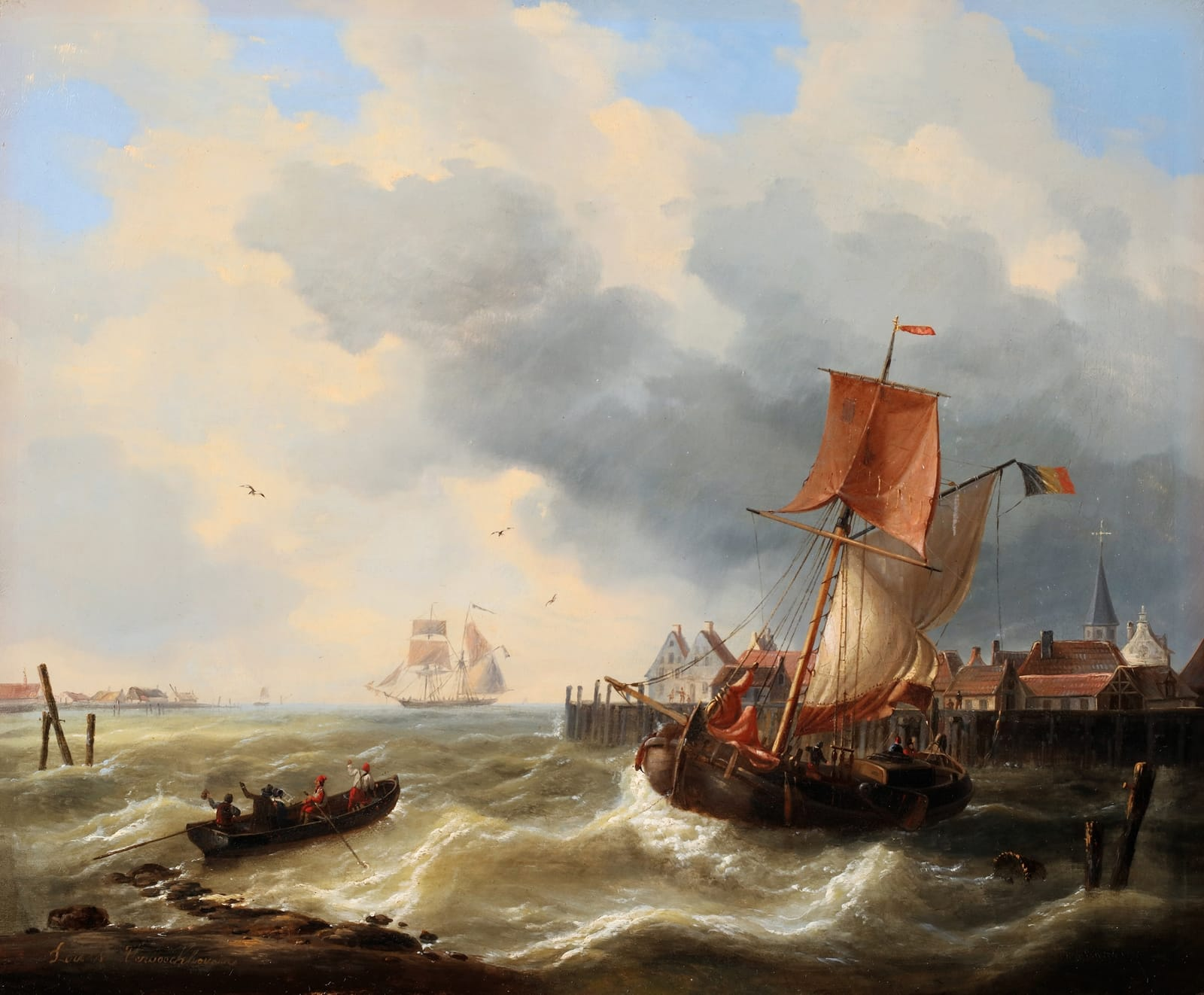
Ships leaving the harbor, (French collection)

Charles-Louis Verboeckhoven (5 February 1802, Comines-Warneton - 25 September 1889, Brussels) was a Belgian marine painter in the Romantic style. His first names are often given as Louis-Charles.

== Biography ==
His father, Barthélemy Verboeckhoven, was a sculptor and his older brother, Eugène, was an animal painter, both of whom provided his first artistic training. In 1815, the family moved to Ghent, where he developed an interest in marine painting and came under the influence of Frans Balthasar Solvyns.

In 1827, along with his father and brother, he established himself in Brussels and, that same year, exhibited two paintings ("Angry Sea" and "Calm Sea") at the local Salon. His work enjoyed immediate popularity. In 1830, however, he turned from painting, becoming involved in the political events that led to the independence of Belgium. He and Eugène both joined the "Korps Jagers van Chasteler" (named after Johann Gabriel Chasteler de Courcelles) and participated in several military actions during the Revolution.

Afterward, his life was essentially a round of exhibitions, including the "Triennial Salons" of Brussels, Ghent and Antwerp and smaller salons in the provinces; punctuated by frequent trips to the coasts of the Netherlands, France and England. By 1837, he appears to have been living in Antwerp. Later, he concentrated on selling his paintings abroad.

After 1842, he used brighter colors and his style became more realistic. Very often, the foreground figures were provided by his brother, who reportedly performed the same service for several well-known landscape painters. Many of his works are set in small harbors along the Scheldt, which have since disappeared and cannot be identified with any certainty.

Toward the end of his career, he was appointed a member of the Rijksakademie. His son, Louis (1827-1884), was also a painter.
