= Royal Academy of Fine Arts of Ghent =

Art school in Ghent, Belgium

- Koninklijke Academie voor Schone Kunsten van Gent
- Type: Art School
- Established: 1748
- Academic affiliations: HOGENT University of Applied Sciences and Arts,
- Location: Bijlokesite, Jozef Kluyskensstraat 2, 9000 Ghent, Ghent, Belgium; 51.0453°N 3.7155°E
- Website: schoolofartsgent.be/en

The Royal Academy of Fine Arts of Ghent (Dutch: Koninklijke Academie voor Schone Kunsten van Gent, KASK) was founded in 1748, making it one of the oldest art schools in Belgium. It is a part of the Hogeschool Gent, a Belgian University college.

== History ==
The Academy was founded in 1748 as a school for drawing by the painter, Philippe Karel Marissal, at his home. During his studies in Paris, Marissal had become impressed by the Académie royale de peinture et de sculpture, and was inspired to create a similar establishment in his home city. The Academy was granted a royal charter in 1771 by the empress Maria Theresa of Austria.

In 1995, the Academy was one of the sixteen educational institutions that were merged into the Hogeschool Gent.

== Staff ==
- Carl De Keyzer
- Pieter-Frans De Noter (1779–1842)
- Félix De Vigne (1806–1862)
- Jean-François Portaels (1818–1895)
- Raoul Servais
- Frits Van den Berghe (1883–1939)
- Roger Wittevrongel

== Alumni ==
- Dirk Braeckman
- Johan Grimonprez
- Joseph-Pierre Braemt (1796–1864)
- Omer Coppens (1864–1926), impressionist
- Walter De Buck (1934–2014)
- Jan De Cock
- Valerius De Saedeleer (1867–1941)
- Gustave De Smet (1877–1943)
- Anna De Weert (1867–1950)
- Gerda Dendooven
- Lukas Dhont
- Nick Ervinck
- Mous Lamrabat (born 1983) Moroccan-born Belgian photographer
- Frans Masereel (1889–1972)
- George Minne (1866–1941)
- Constant Montald (1862–1944)
- Joseph Paelinck (1781–1839)
- Constant Permeke (1886–1952)
- Max Pinckers
- Raoul Servais
- Gustave Van de Woestyne (1881–1947)
- Frits Van den Berghe (1883–1939)
- Maarten van Severen (architecture), furniture designer and interior architect
- Felix Van Groeningen
- Wim Delvoye, neo-conceptual artist
- Jan Van Imschoot
- Geo Verbanck (1881–1961)
- Roger Wittevrongel
