= Eugène Verboeckhoven =

Belgian artist (1798–1881)

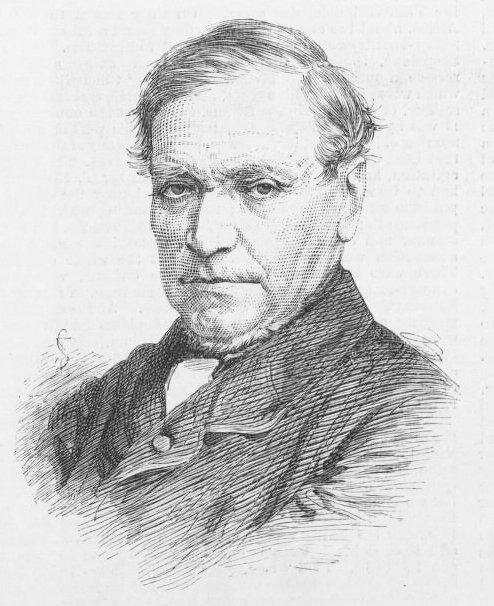

Eugène Joseph Verboeckhoven (9 June 1798 – 19 January 1881) was a Belgian painter, a sculptor, an etcher, an engraver, and a lithographer of animals, animated landscapes, and portraits.

== Biography ==
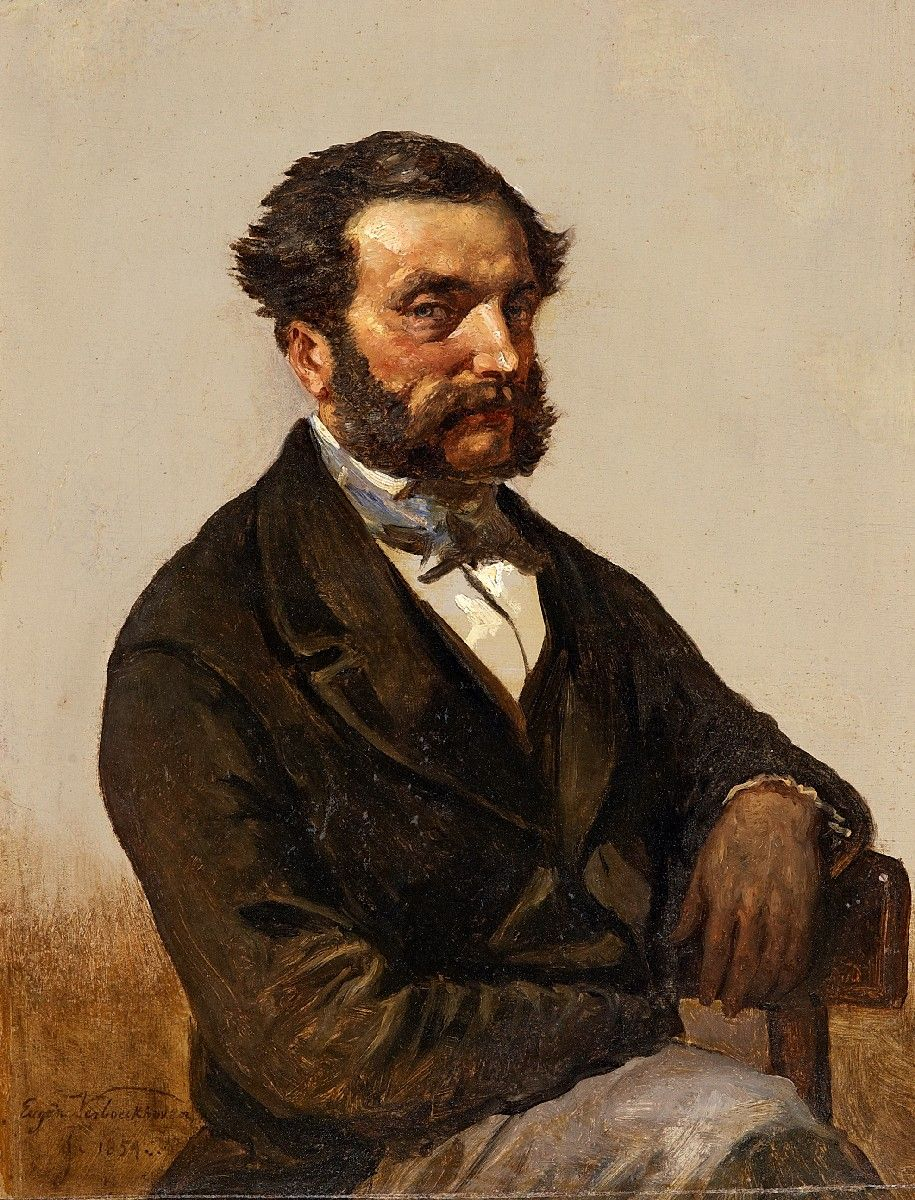
Self-portrait (1854)

Eugène Verboeckhoven was born at Warneton in West Flanders. He studied under his father, Barthélemy Verboeckhoven, a sculptor. In 1816 he worked under Voituron in Ghent. In the first half of the 19th century, the salons were a home for burgeoning art. Verboeckhoven was a regular participant at the Ghent (1820 and 1824) and Brussels Salons (1827–1860). He visited the Ardennes, France, Great Britain (1826), Germany (1828) and Italy (1841). He was held in high repute and elaborated on the works of artists such as De Jonghe, De Noter, Koekkoek, Daiwaille, Kheelhof, Verheyden, and his pupils Louis-Pierre Verwee and the Tschaggeny brothers. He was a member of the academies of Brussels, Ghent, Antwerp, St. Petersburg and Amsterdam.

Verboeckhoven was an excellent painter of animals and, together with his pupils, appears to have been the last link to a secular tradition with its roots deep in the 17th century, which linked observation of nature, studied composition, and idealized reproduction of reality. Like the Old Masters, he obtained the colour blue for his skies by grinding down lapis lazuli. He was a prolific artist and very meticulous in his preparation: hundreds of sketches and studies were produced on the spot, assembling different elements like pieces of a jigsaw puzzle. Such was his dexterity that many artists called upon him to enrich their works with some of his animals and figures. Between 1841 and 1842, he visited Italy, Switzerland, and Scotland. His inspiration remained the same and his technique unaltered, but his notebooks were now filled with sketches of different landscapes.

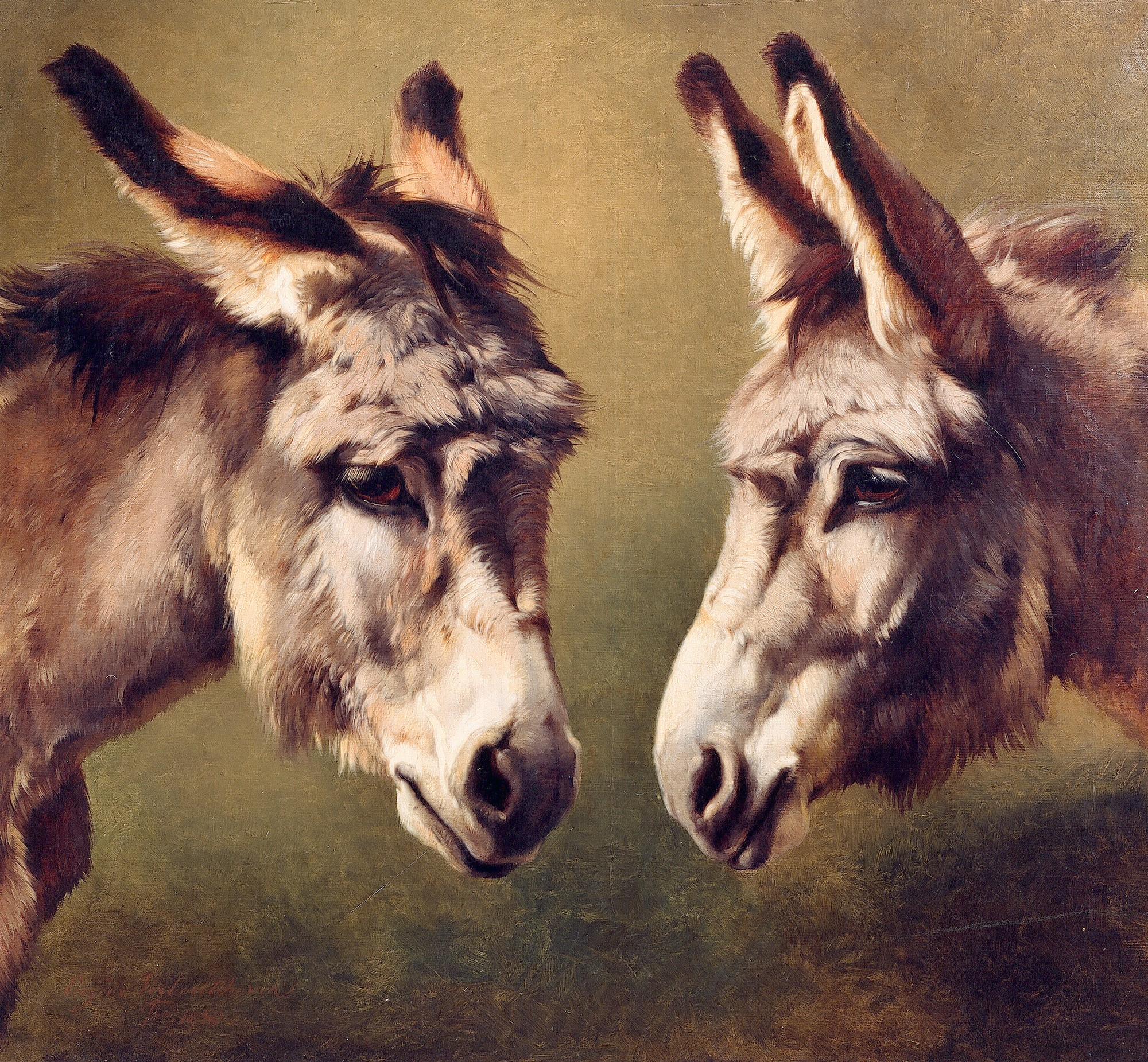
The Donkeys of Schaarbeek (1850)

The beauty that emanates from his paintings occasionally hides Verboeckhoven's fundamental talent for drawing. Attention should first be drawn to his preparatory works: his sketches, lithographs, and engravings. His portraits, historical subjects, and sculptures also merit attention.

=== Membership and awards ===
He was a Member of The Royal Academy of Belgium, of the Commission of Directors of the Royal Museums of Painting and Sculpture of Belgium; of Royal Academy of Fine Arts (Antwerp), Ghent, and St Petersburg; Commander of the Orders of Leopold, of Franz Joseph of Austria, Chevalier of the Legion of Honour of France, of the Merit of the St Michael of Bavaria, of Christ of Portugal. He also possessed the Croix de Guerre, which he received for his patriotic services during the Belgian Revolution of 1830. He was buried with Military honours.

=== Other activities ===
A man of his time, he played an important role in the Belgian Revolution of 1830 and was appointed Director General of the Brussels Museums of Fine Arts by the temporary government. Until the end of his life, he was a member of the Committee of the Royal Museums of Fine Arts and when King Leopold I created the category of Fine Arts at the Academy in 1848, he was on the advisory board. Verboeckhoven was also involved in local politics. From 1861 to 1867, he was the Deputy Mayor for the Schaerbeek Council, Brussels.

Like many of his colleagues, Verboeckhoven was a freemason. He joined the Brussels Lodge in 1834 with his brother Charles-Louis, a well-known marine painter, and his initiation took place on 25 February 1834. Shortly after joining, he suggested founding a Freemason museum. He was very attached to his philosophical convictions and from 1834 onwards and systematically after 1850 added the triangle of three Masonic points to his signature. Eugène Verboeckhoven died in Schaerbeek, Brussels, in 1881. His works are held in museums worldwide.

== Selected paintings ==
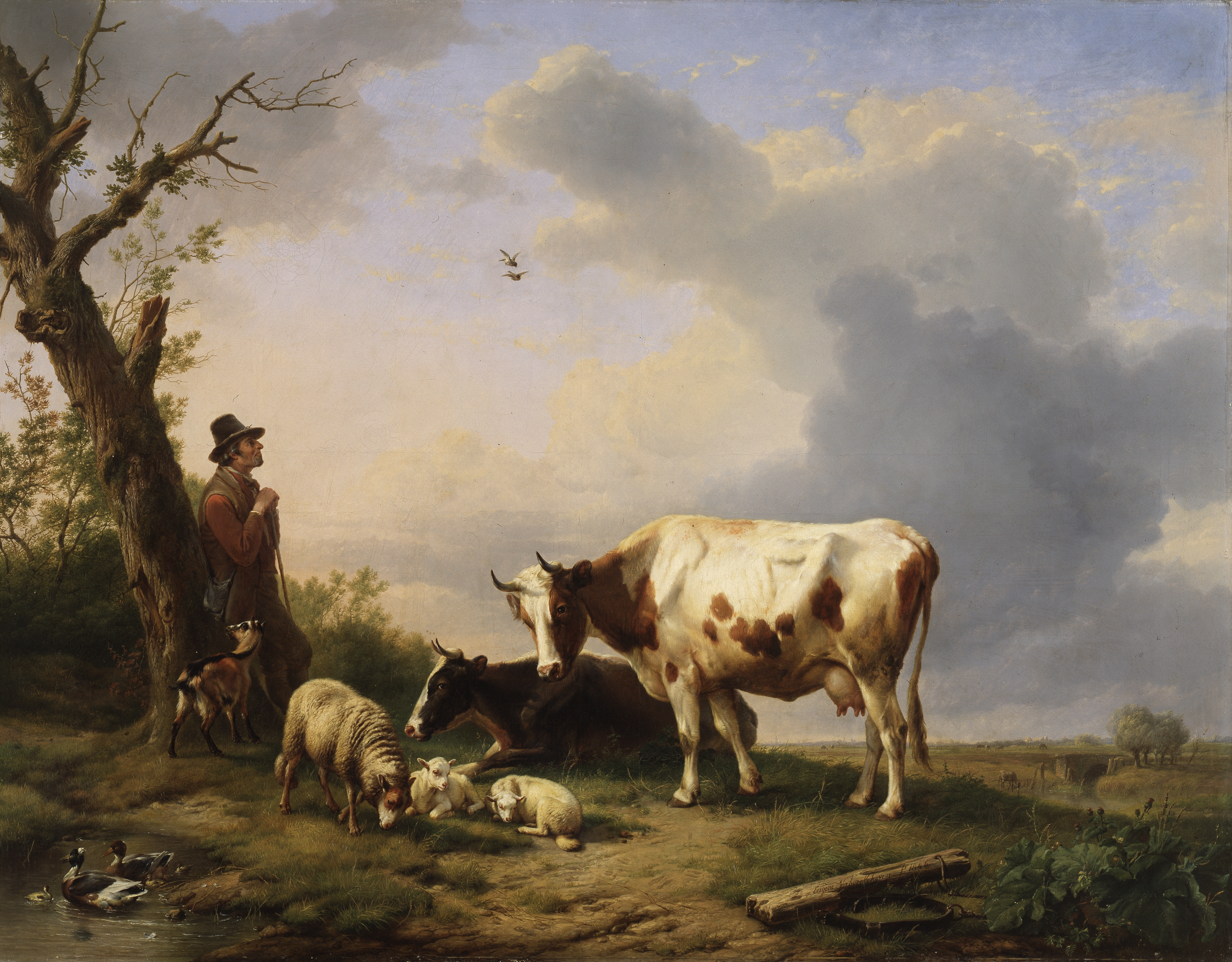
Landscape with a herder and his flock (1846)

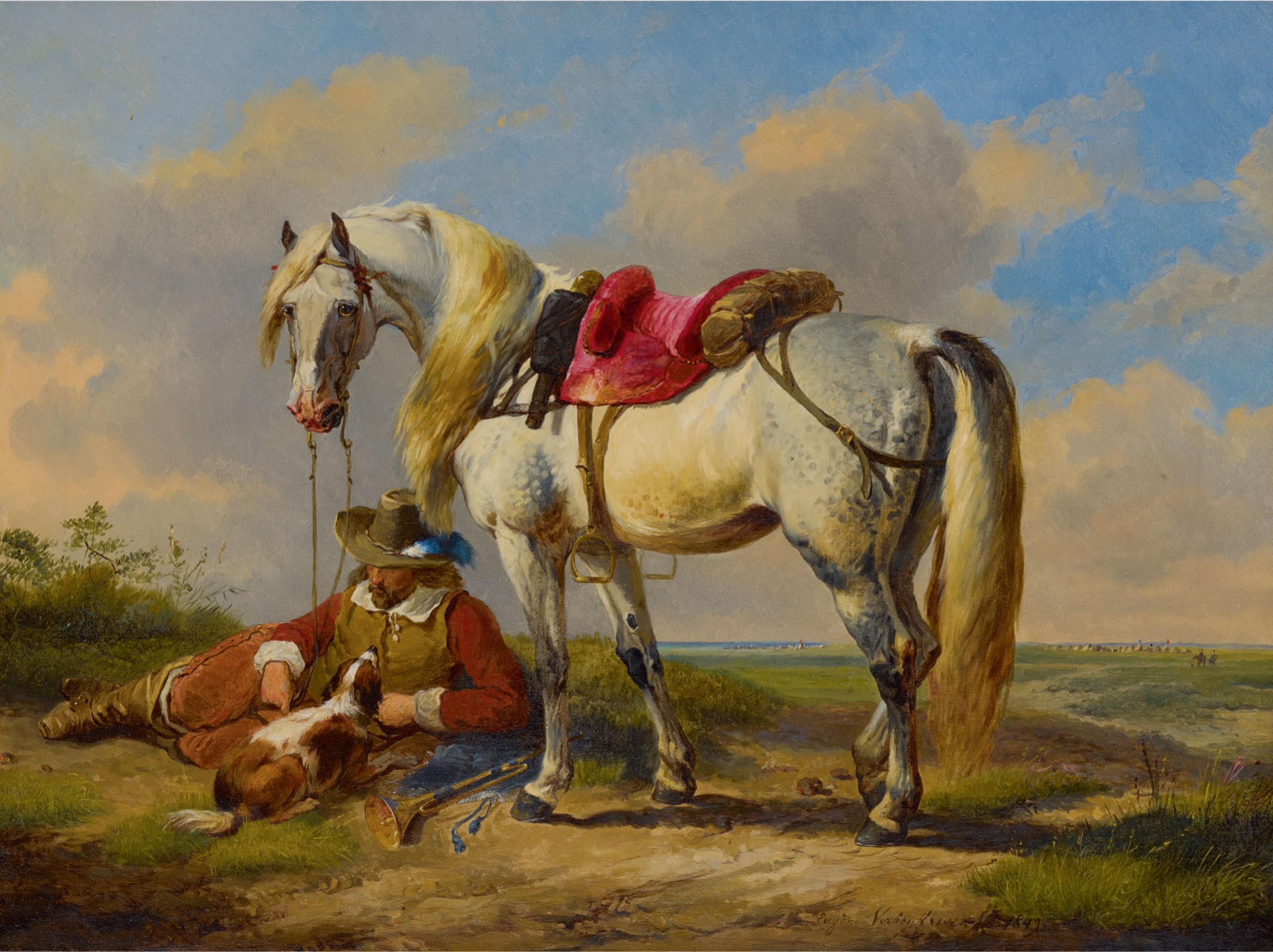
Cavalier at rest (1849)

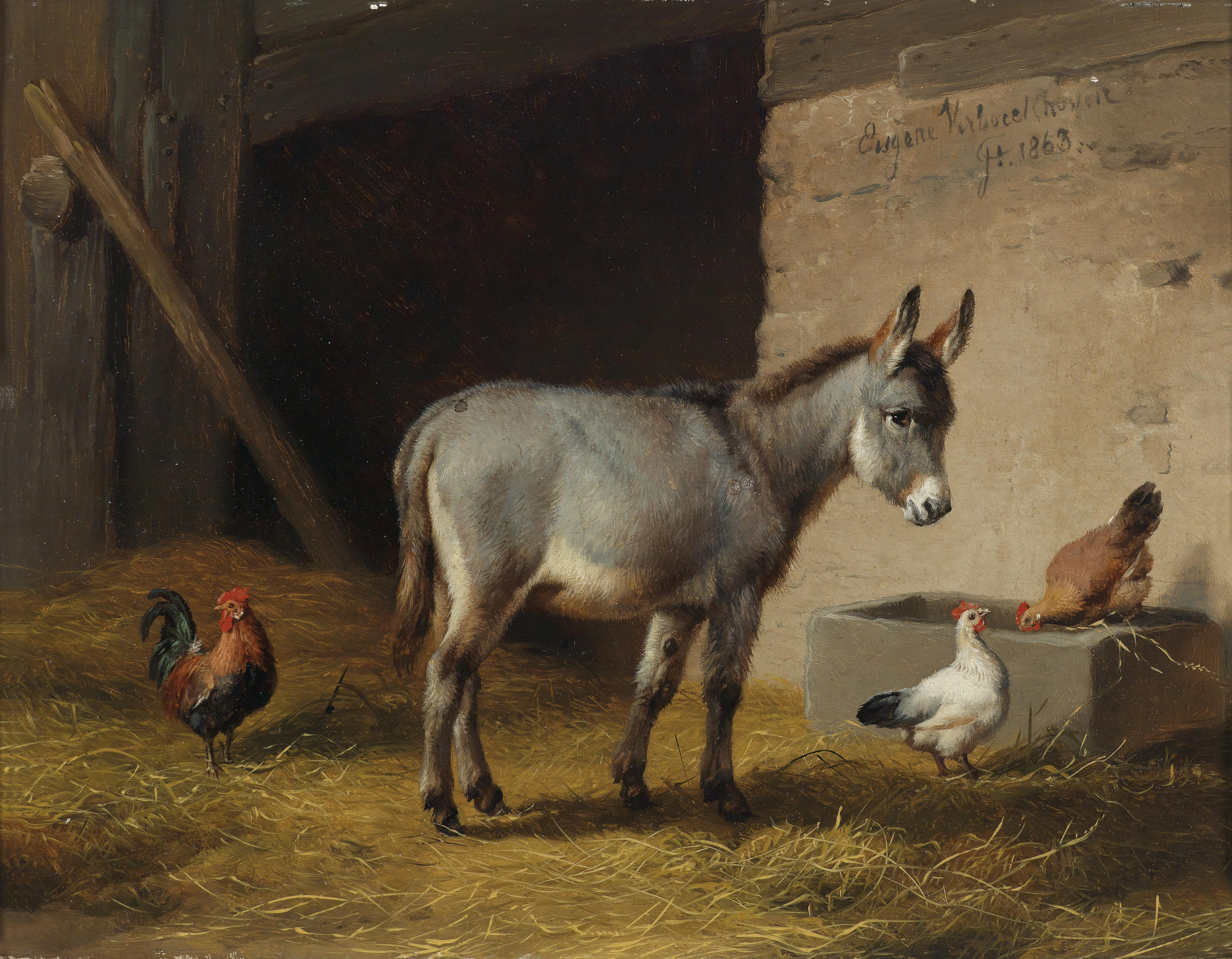
Donkey and Hens in the Barn (1863)

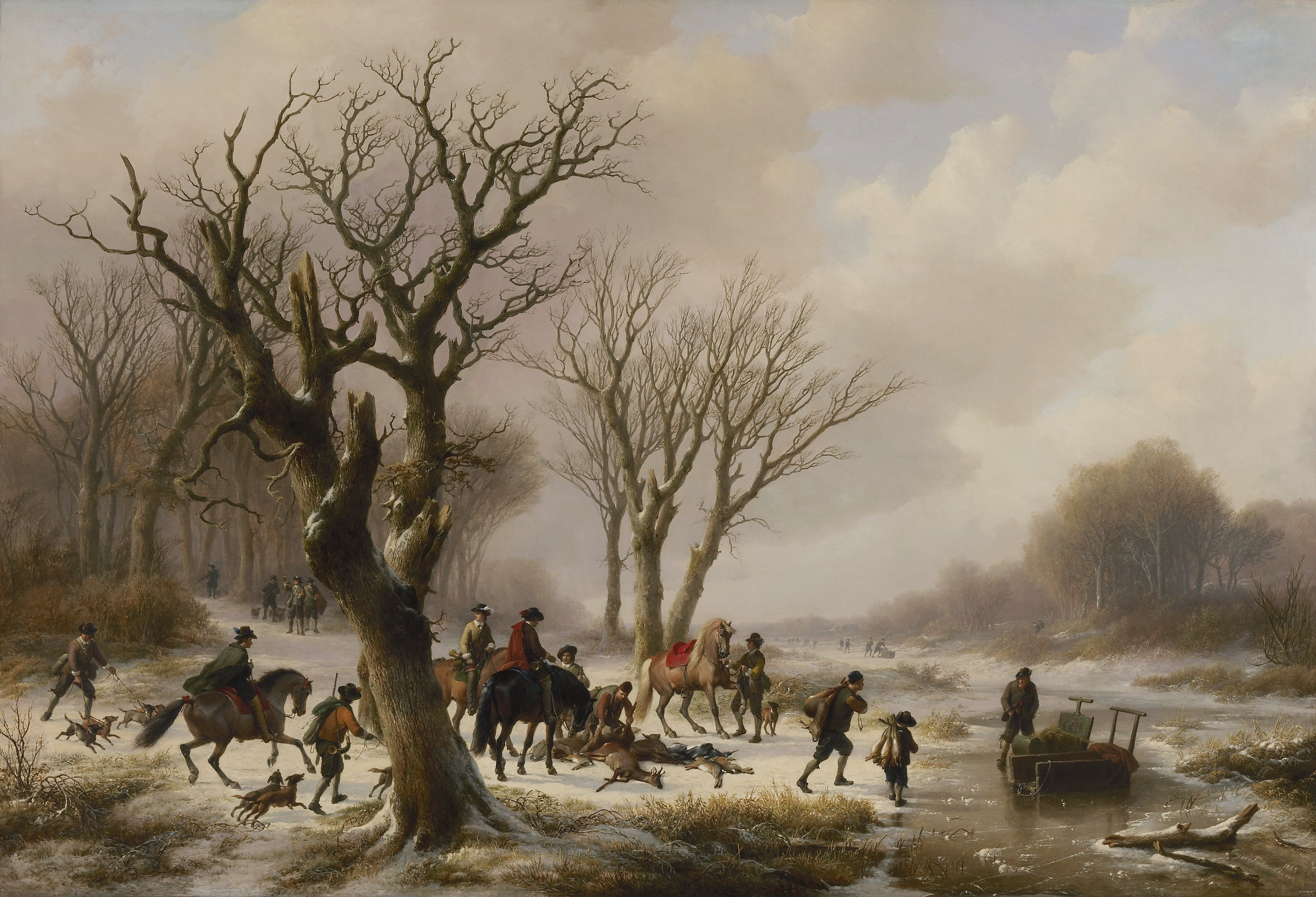
On the Hunt (1865)

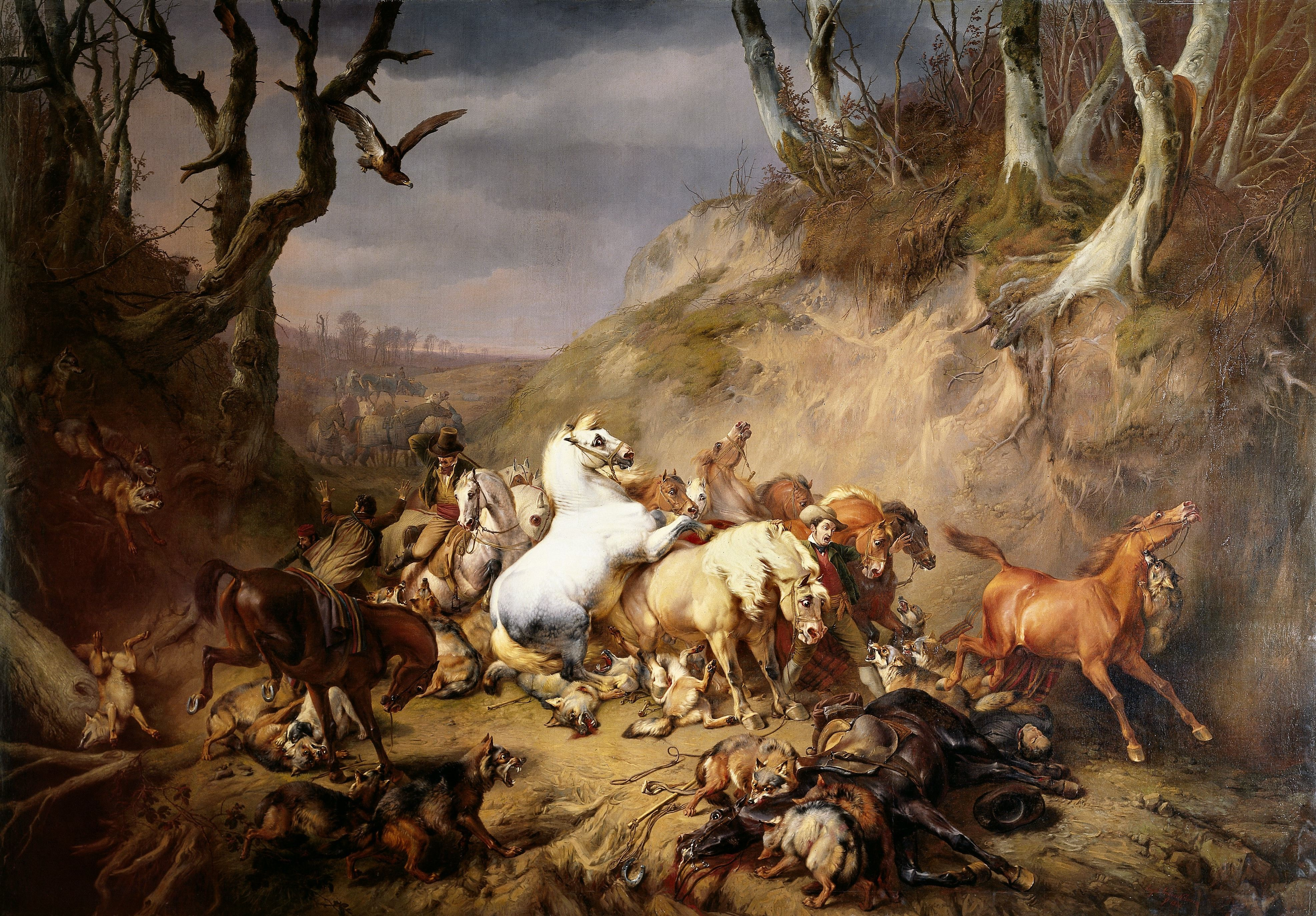
Hungry Wolves Attacking a Group of Horsemen (1836)

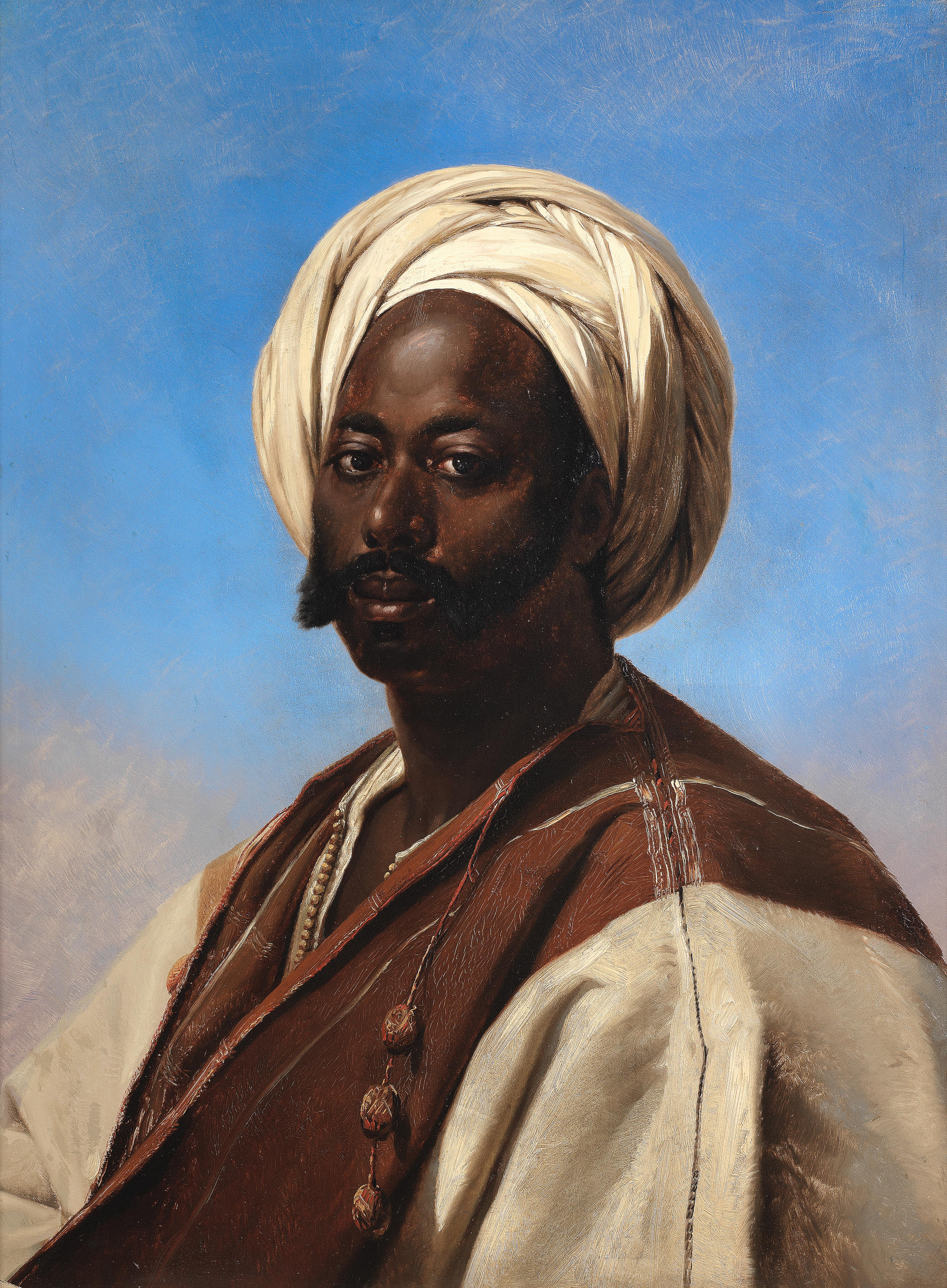
Portrait of a man in a white turban (1881)

== Sources ==
- P. & V. Berko, "Dictionary of Belgian painters born between 1750 & 1875", Knokke 1981, pp. 738–740.
- P. & V. Berko, N. Hostyn e.a. Eugène Verboeckhoven, Knokke, 1981. Online Consultation
- P. & V. Berko, "Dictionary of Animal Painters; Belgian and Dutch Artists born between 1750 and 1880", Knokke 1998, pp. 7–73 & 484–485.
- P. & V. Berko, "19th Century European Virtuoso Painters", Knokke 2011, pp. 518–519, illustrations pp. 256–257, 318, 319, 335, 337, 339, 341, 342, 343, 344, 345, 346, 347, 349, 358, 359, 361, 366, 432, 433.
