= Graslei =

Quay in Ghent, Belgium

Coordinates: 51°3′18″N 3°43′15″E

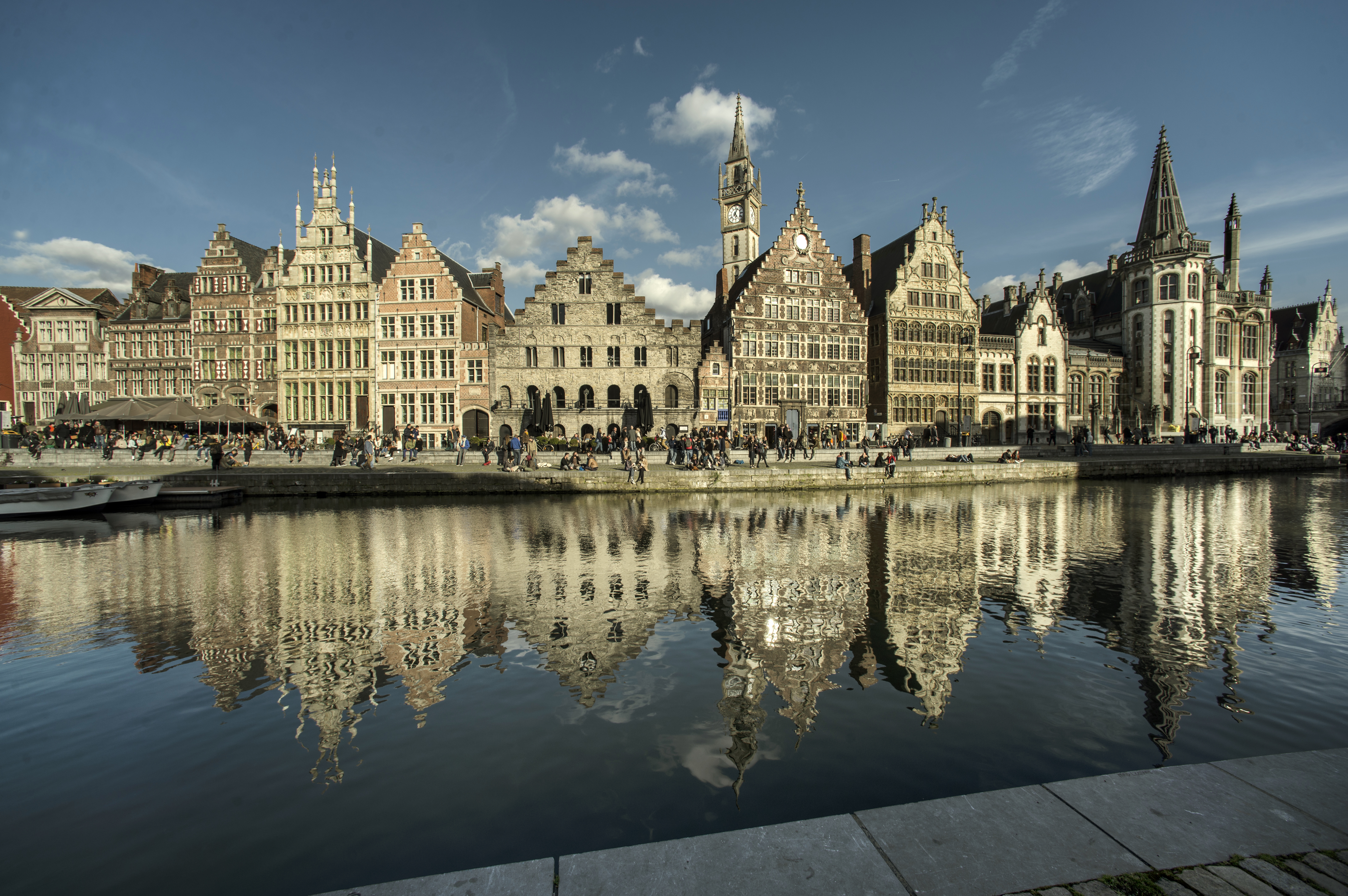
General view of the Graslei with the Leie river in the foreground.

Graslei (Dutch pronunciation: [ˈɣrɑslɛi]; English: Grass Quay) is a quay in the historic city center of Ghent, Belgium, located on the right bank of the Leie river. The quay opposite of the Graslei is called Korenlei. Both quays were part of the medieval port and are now a cultural and touristic hotspot of the city, with a high concentration of café patios. The site, with its unique row of historical buildings, is a protected cityscape.

== History ==
Laid out along the Leie river, close to the mouth in the Scheldt, the site is considered one of the oldest of Ghent, dating back to the fifth century A.D. when Ghent was the center of the wheat trade in the County of Flanders. Most of the current houses on the Graslei date back to the Middle Ages, although the monumental façades have been heavily modified in the 18th and 19th century and were restored in anticipation of the 1913 World's Fair hosted by Ghent.

== Panorama ==
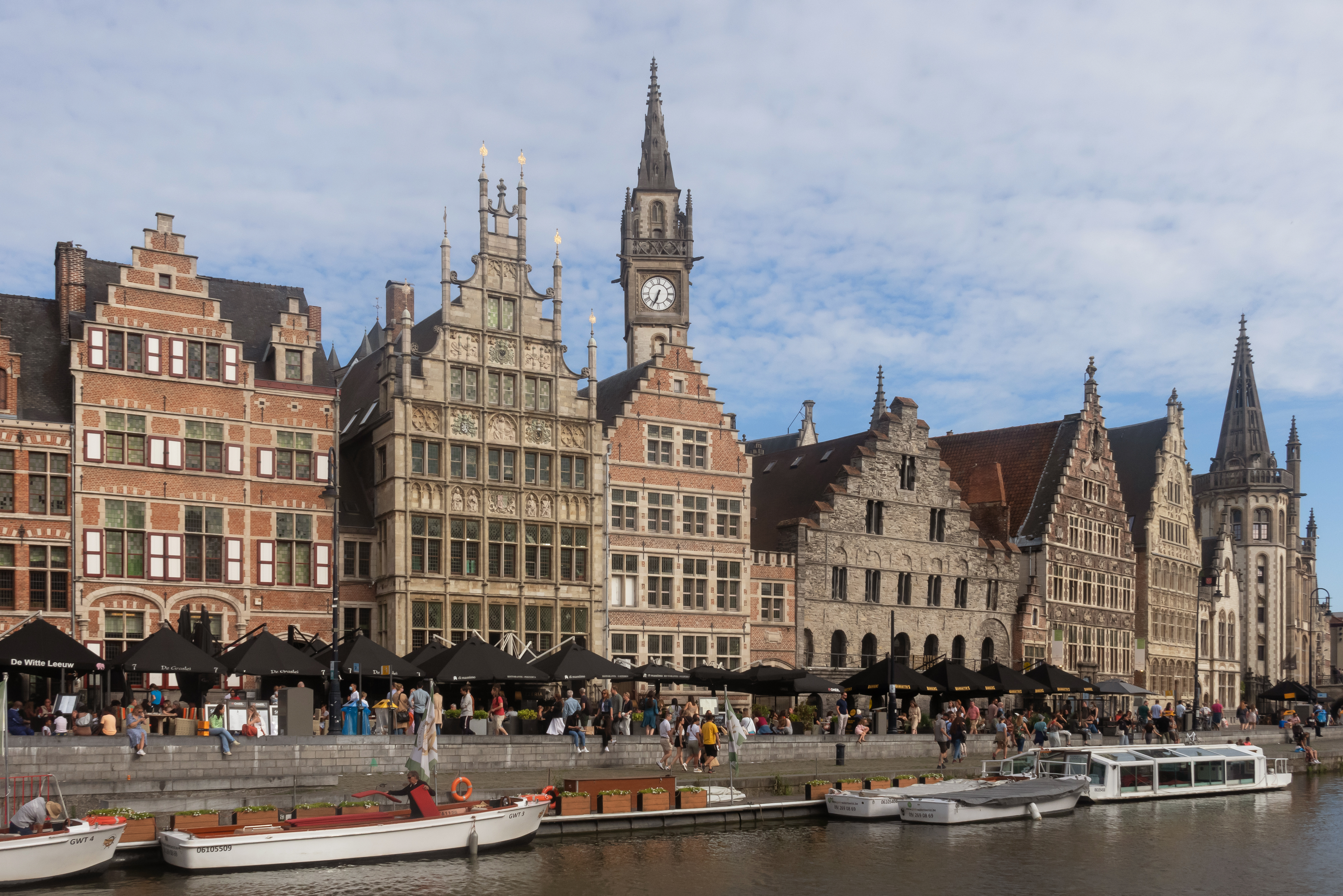
Panoramic view of Graslei. From left to right: Den Witten Leeuw (Graslei no. 6); Graslei no. 7; Den Enghel (Graslei no. 8); Eerste Korenmetershuis (Graslei no. 9); Spijker (Graslei no. 10); Tolhuisje (Graslei no. 11, Tollhouse); Tweede Korenmetershuis (Graslei no. 12); Vrije Schippers Guildhall (Graslei no. 14). There is not any no. 13.
