= Korenlei =

Coordinates: 51°3′18″N 3°43′15″E

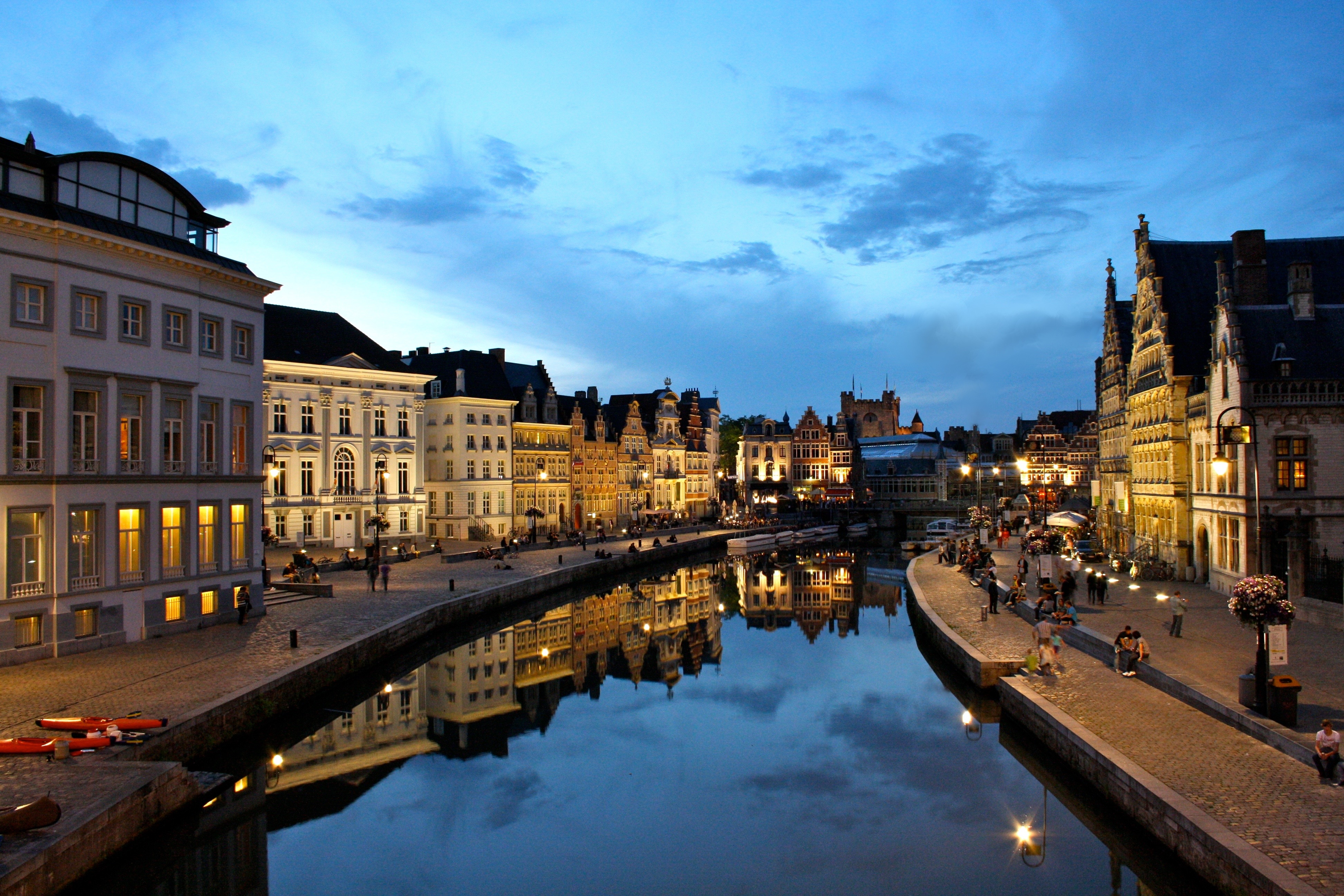
View of the Korenlei (left), Leie river (center) and Graslei (right).

Korenlei (Dutch pronunciation: [ˈkoːrə(n)lɛi]; English: Wheat Quay or Corn Quay) is a quay in the historic city center of Ghent, Belgium, located on the left bank of the Leie river. The quay on the opposite bank of the Leie is Graslei.
