= Vincent De Vos =

Belgian artist (1829–1875)

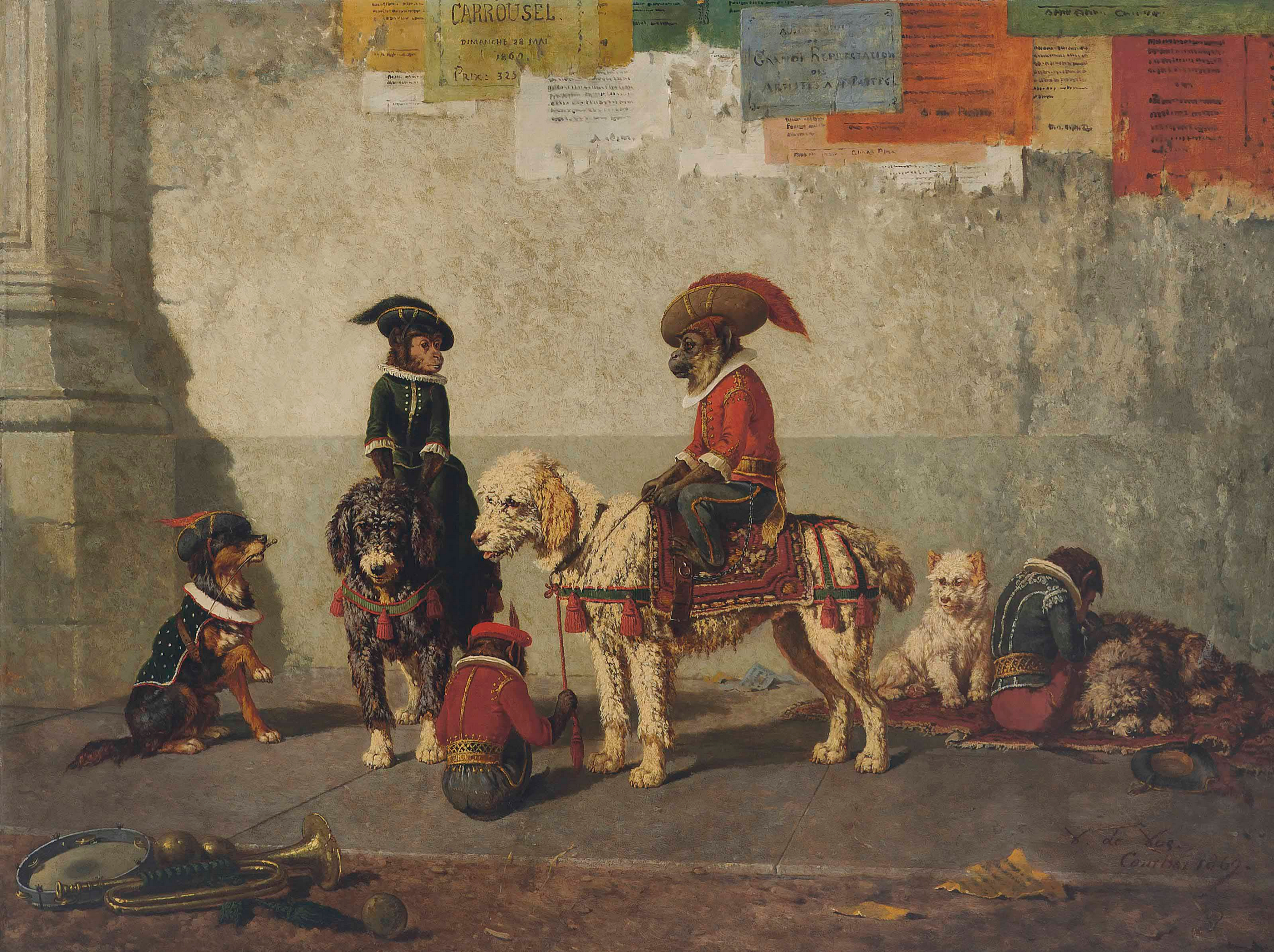
Circus friends, 1869

Vincent de Vos or Joost Vincent de Vos (1829–1875) was a Belgian artist who specialized in the painting of scenes with animals, in particular, monkeys, dogs and cats. He is particularly known for his singeries, i.e. paintings of monkeys imitating human behavior intended as a diverting satire of human behaviour.

== Life ==
Vincent de Vos was born in Kortrijk, Belgium in 1829, the son of Jan Eugene Vos, a miller, and Marie Anne Verhaeghe. He studied at the Academy of Kortrijk under Filip De Witte, a painter of portraits, genre scenes and biblical scenes. Edward Woutermaertens introduced him to the painting of animals. At the academy, his early works won medals for composition in 1848, drawing after antique sculpture in 1849, anatomy in 1851, and the gold medal for perspective in 1852.

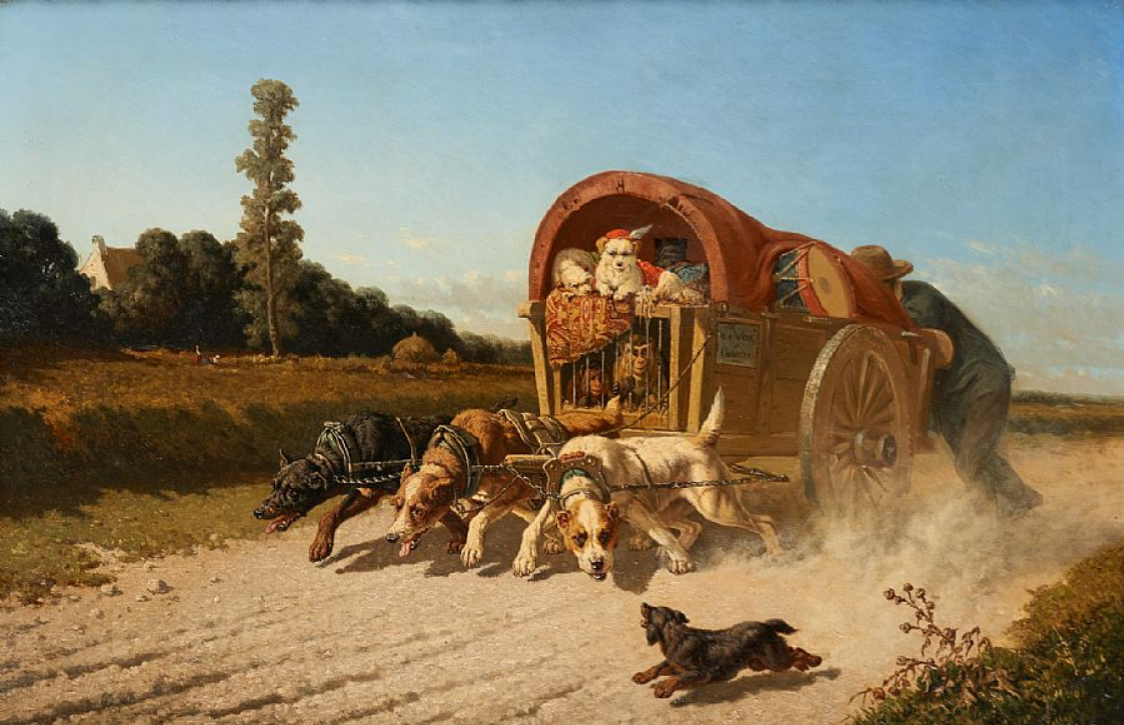
Menagerie pulled by dogs, c. 1860

In 1870 he travelled to Italy where he spent time in the Roman Campagna. He eventually settled down in his home town Kortrijk, where he set up his studio. He kept a small menagerie with dogs, wolves, foxes, monkeys and even a camel. These were useful as the models for his works which consisted mainly of small sized paintings of animals.

His work was successful commercially, and was exhibited primarily in Belgium and France.

He died in Kortrijk on 5 October 1875.

== Works ==
He painted principally dogs and monkeys, which he depicted with a lot of sense for psychology, and often in a rather humouristic way. Animals, particularly monkeys and dogs, were frequent subjects of his work. He often depicted animals in circus costume. The paintings typically are small in size, and dates, titles and signatures often are hidden as box labels or in posters depicted in the work. De Vos, together with the brothers Emmanuel Noterman and Zacharie Noterman, was one of the principal 19th century Belgian painters of animal scenes with monkeys and dogs. Like those two artists, he created a number of singeries, i.e. paintings of monkeys engaging in human activities.

== Selected works ==
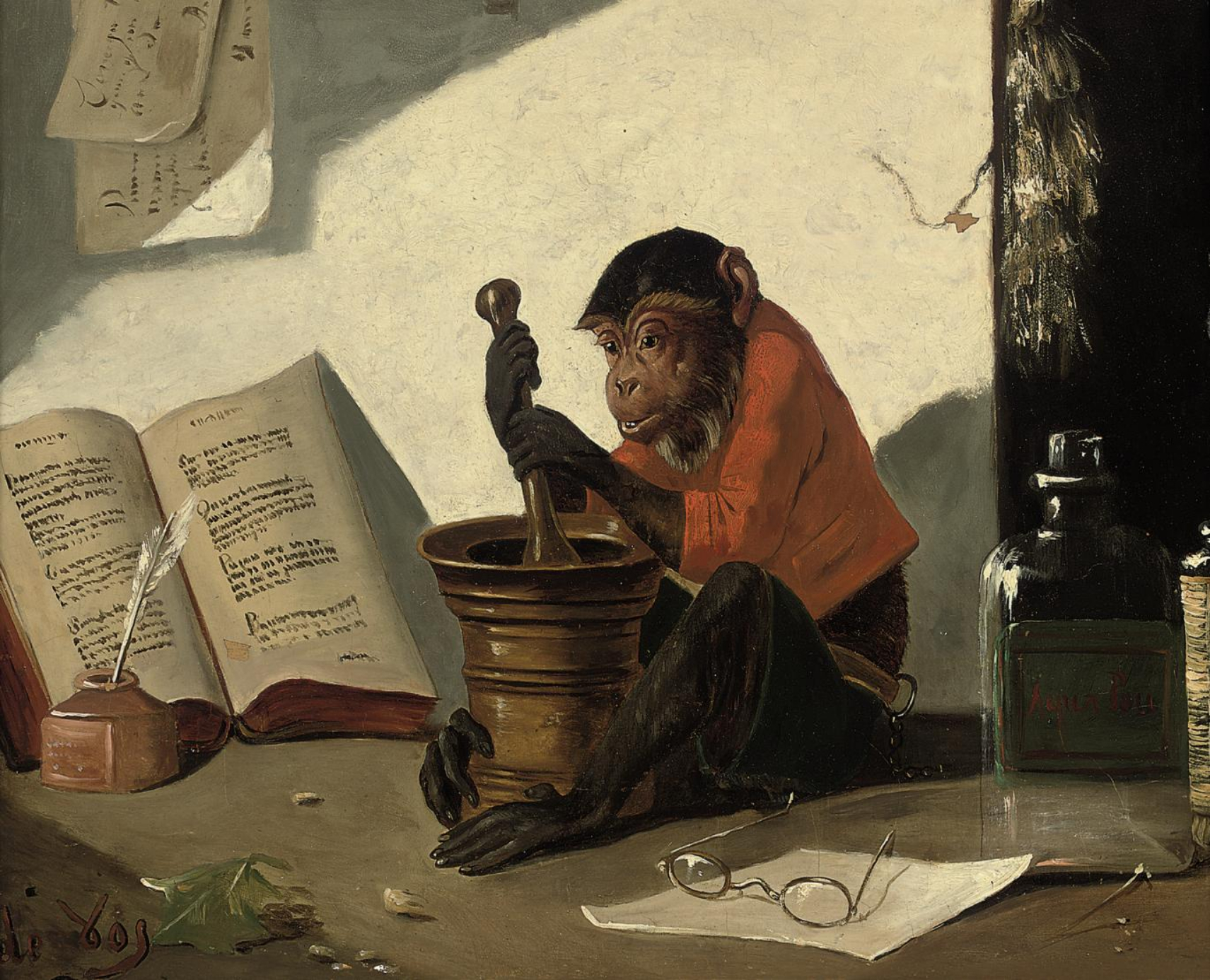
The simean alchemist c. 1860

His works include:

- Circus monkey and dog
- At the market
- Rest after the hunt
- A Blenheim and a Tricolour King Charles Spaniel on a Persian
- Two dogs by the doghouse
- At play
- Best friends
- A terrier smoking a pipe
- Dog meets mice, 1865
