= Noterman =

Notermans is a surname. Notable people with the surname include:

- Emmanuel Noterman (1808–1863), Belgian painter and printmaker
- Zacharie Noterman (1820–1890), Belgian painter and printmaker

== See also ==
- Jan Notermans (1932–2017), Dutch football player and manager
