= The Parisian Sphinx =

Painting by Alfred Stevens

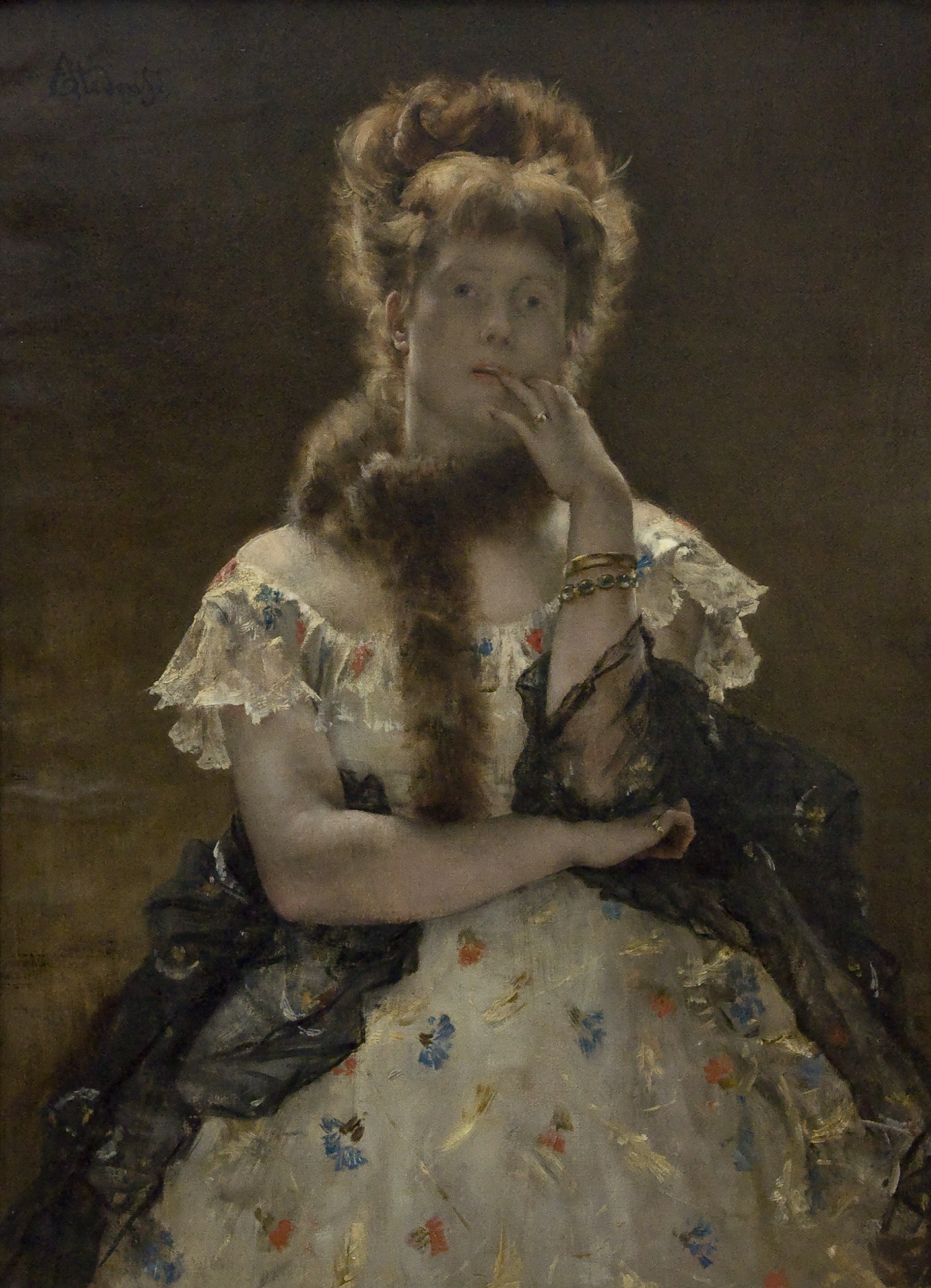
- Artist: Alfred Stevens
- Year: 1875–1877
- Catalogue: 1373
- Medium: Oil on canvas
- Dimensions: 72 cm × 52 cm (29.5 in × 20 4/7 in)
- Location: Royal Museum of Fine Arts Antwerp, Antwerp

The Parisian Sphinx is an oil-on-canvas painting by Belgian painter Alfred Stevens. Painted between 1875 and 1877, it depicts a dreamy young woman (or aristocratic demi-monde) gently supporting her head with her hand. The painting is part of the permanent collection of the Royal Museum of Fine Arts in Antwerp. The Parisian Sphinx shows the influence of Vermeer and the other Netherlandish old masters on Stevens, and testifies to the Symbolist influence in the latter's day. It incorporates a harmonious juxtaposition of superficial Dutch realism with the spreading Symbolist manner, as opposed to the bottom-up, pluralistic symbolism of the declining Romanticism.

Beside being renowned for its realism and luminism, The Parisian Sphinx has been described as enigmatic. Critics agree in that the apparently realistic painting conceals a hidden meaning. Many point to the "hidden dangers behind feminine tenderness", and to the figure of the femme fatale.

== Background ==
Alfred Stevens was born in Brussels on May 11, 1823. He received his training in the Brussels studio of François-Joseph Navez, a successful Belgian portraitist. Stevens belonged to the generation of Joseph Lies, Jean Pierre François Lamorinière and Liévin De Winne. He received his training together with Charles de Groux and Jan Frans Portaels. Alfred Stevens and his brothers grew up with their grandfather, who ran the popular Brussels cafe de l'amitié. The latter was an intellectual gathering place of progressionists and dissenters. Stevens' aversion to history painting was manifested in his reaction to the current heroic romance of his time. He later wrote: "the historical subject was invented when people stopped being interested in painting itself." Two constants permeated both his upbringing and his later oeuvre: realism in his art and bourgeois materialism in his lifestyle.

It was Camille Roqueplan who persuaded Stevens to move to Paris, which he did in 1851. His brothers also moved to Paris: Joseph Stevens became a celebrated Belgian animal painter and Arthur Stevens, who was a critic, was the best advertisement for the brother painters. Alfred grew into a Parisian society that had mastered fashion genre painting for almost twenty years. After initially focusing on realistic, socially motivated works (1844), around 1855 he increasingly turned to the depiction of chic middle-class ladies. He depicted them all with their intricate hairstyles, colorful clothes and finery in genre pieces in which he captured a fleeting mood—he sadness of a farewell, the emotion of a letter, the rustle of a silk dress. Each atmospheric painting is packed with wealth and luxury.

The Second Empire was a bourgeoisian period in which Stevens became the chronicler par excellence of the demi-mondaines, making his name in Paris as a painter of dressed ladies. Unlike Franz Xaver Winterhalter, the official portraitist of the French imperial family and Steven's rival in the genre, Stevens chose his models from among the wealthy upper classes. The demi-mondaines were maintained by their lovers and often had nothing to do at all. They read books, waited for their lovers to return, made themselves up and passed their time in salons, exhibitions and seaside towns.

His fascination for the female figure in art is evidenced by one of the 360 aphorisms in Steven's Impressions sur la peinture. In it he states: "The glance of a woman has more charm than the most beautiful landscape or seascape, and is more beautiful than a ray of sunlight." His choice of bourgeois ladies was unprecedented. Female figures were more likely to play a mythological or historical role in painting. However, Stevens showed them as precious objects in richly decorated environments. His paintings, in which he usually depicted lone women, are often a confluence of individual portraitures and types. Individual women disappeared behind their fashionable clothes and stereotypical attitudes. It gave his paintings a hint of theatricality and false sensibility. The female models of Stevens' paintings were described by Joris-Karl Huysmans as des petites femmes, qui ne sont plus des flamandes et qui ne seront jamais des Parisiennes. The graceful postures and elegant bodies are French, yet the women are more reminiscent of (stereotypical) Flanders. Stevens' characters often have strong facial features with a wide chin and short, sturdy arms and hands.

In 1863 Stevens was made a Knight of the Legion of Honor . A year later, Gustave Moreau achieved great success at the Paris Salon with his mythological Oedipus and the Sphinx. He painted the sphinx as a monster with a lion's body and a woman's head and breasts. The sphinx was a very popular topos, one of the most common symbols of lust in the nineteenth century.

In 1884 a friend of Steven's, the transgressive Baudelaire (who dedicated a poem to Stevens' brother Joseph and initially praised Alfred, although later, in an unpublished work, he condescendingly described him as a 'Flemish painter' because of the Flemings' excellence in the imitation of nature) opposed the neoclassicism paradigm and defended his transgressive decadentism, stating: "Littérature de décadence! Paroles vides de sens que nous entendons souvent tomber, avec la sonorité d’un bâillement emphatique, de la bouche de ces sphinx sans énigme qui veillent devant les portes saintes de l’Esthétique classique"

1867 was a successful year for Stevens: at the World Exhibition of that year he was given a separate room in which he could hang eighteen paintings; he was appointed to the Legion of Honor by Emperor Napoleon III, and imperial and royal orders poured in. The year before, he had been appointed an officer in the Order of Leopold . His group of friends included Eugène Delacroix (who attended his wedding in 1858), Alexandre Dumas Jr., Édouard Manet, James Abbott McNeill Whistler and Émile Zola. His contemporaries praised him, with the poet Robert de Montesquiou calling him le sonnettiste de la peinture. After 1870, Stevens' popularity diminished, with Baudelaire, whose conferences in Belgium and travel to the Netherlands had turned into a fiasco, writing of him in the discriminatory and anti-BelgianPauvre Belgique: "Le grand malheur de ce peintre minutieux, c ’est que la lettre, le bouquet, la chaise, la bague, la guipure, etc ..... deviennent, tour à tour, l’objet important, l’objet qui crève les yeux. — En somme, c ’est un peintre parfaitement flamand, en tant qu ’il y ait de la perfection dans le néant, ou dans l’imitation de la nature, ce qui est la même chose."

Beside being renowned for its realism, The Parisian Sphinx has been described as enigmatic, with most critics pointing to the femme-fatale figure, and the hidden dangers beyond feminine tenderness.

Stevens painted other versions of The Parisian Sphinx in 1870 and 1880. According to Julian Bell, the model for the 1870 painting was Victorine Meurent.

== Description ==
The Sphinx, a young woman depicted frontally, appears as a tender girl lost in thought. She has her hair arranged nicely and is neatly dressed. She wears an airy, elegant, white muslin robe with faint blue, red and yellow flowers. She wears a fur scarf around her neck and a black tulle scarf partly covers her left arm. She tilts her head slightly and gracefully brings her fingers to her lips. She radiates grace and youthful freshness at the same time, with the nonchalance of bourgeois romanticism.

Stevens painted a neutral brown background with neither objects nor attributes. Contrary to what the name suggests, no dead men, weapons or even mythological symbols are on display. The young lady that Stevens painted in his Parisian Sphinx is enigmatic, and quite different from the kind of ladies he usually depicted, in their richly appointed interiors, full of frills and ornaments. The viewer is left wondering: Who is she? What riddles does she have to tell? With the title merely adding to the mystery.

Supporting her head slightly, the young woman stares dreamily in front of her in the direction of the viewer. There is something inscrutable about it, something the viewer can keep speculating about. By calling her a 'sphinx,' Stevens reinforced the hint of mystery that surrounds the apparent realism of an ordinary Parisian bourgeois lady's depiction.

In The Parisian Sphinx, Stevens renounces the narrative aspect that characterizes his other paintings so strongly. It is also a work in which his interest in luminism comes to the fore. By aiming an invisible, oblique light source on the woman's head, he builds a poetic wreath around her face. In his painting style and color, enlivened by luminism, the influence of young impressionism is clear. His usual smooth way of painting gives way to a refined tendency towards suggestion. Art historians place the color distribution in this work among Stevens' most painterly achievements. The fresh hues of the dress and the soft glow of the Sphinx's young skin are enhanced by the brown background. They also break the static character of the figure.

== Meaning ==
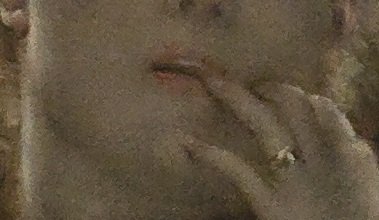
Detail of the Sphinx's mouth

In The Parisian Sphinx, Stevens turns a young bourgeoise into a mysterious and sensual apparition. A femme fatale. The contrast between tenderness and beauty and hidden danger in the girl, is paralleled by the dualistic nature of the painting, with its immediate, eye-pleasing realism against its hidden Symbolism. Stevens usually portrayed contemporary women purely as seductive subjects, although they had been traditionally given historical or mythological roles in painting. By contrast, according to Kathrin Hoffmann-Curtis, in this painting Stevens encoded his supposedly realistic portrait with the danger of the mythological figure. Stevens used hidden signs in a discerning way similar to Dante Gabriel Rossetti's in Bocca Baciata. Since the mid-19th century, Pre-Raphaelite and Symbolist artists had been employing literary metaphors wherein femininity covertly represented love and death. Stevens on his part portrayed his Parisian Sphinx as cuddly, dreamy and mind-wandering.

The gaze of the viewer is drawn to the woman's mouth, whose redness corresponds to the red fingernails of the young lady's long white hand. Stevens draws attention to the mouth, which was considered the central female sexual organ. Some features of the painting are reminiscent of Rossetti's Bocca Baciata, where the mouth functions as "the classic fetish object that by recalling breast-feeding and sexuality, suggests the possibilities of pleasure, fear and loss." The fur scarf barely discernible from her hair and contrasting with the softness of her muslin dress, reminds of the animality of the Sphinx. The whole picture is balanced between melancholy, childlike reflection, and dangerous beauty.

== Sources ==
- "The Parisian Sphinx". KMSKA.
- Hoffmann-Curtis, Kathrine (2008). Women and Death Representations of Female Victims and Perpetrators in German Culture 1500-2000. Rochester, NY: Camden House Publishing. pp. 160–165. ISBN 9781571133854.
- Leen de Jong, in Openbaar Kunstbezit Vlaanderen 1971, p. 4-4b.
- Jan Lea Broeckx in Musea van België. Koninklijk Museum voor Schone Kunsten te Antwerpen. Moderne meesters, 1958, nr. 5; Leen de Jong, in Moderne Meesters in het Koninklijk Museum, 1992, nr. 6.
- https://www.kmska.be/nl/collectie/highlights/Parijse_sfinks.html
- Leen de Jong, in Het Museumboek. Hoogtepunten uit de verzameling, 2003, p. 142; Leen de Jong, in Openbaar Kunstbezit Vlaanderen 1971, p. 4-4b.
- Leen de Jong, in Het Museumboek. Hoogtepunten uit de verzameling, 2003, p. 142.
- Topstukken, 2007.
- De Parijse sfinks op kmska.be; Leen de Jong, in Het Museumboek. Hoogtepunten uit de verzameling, 2003, p. 142.
- Jan Lea Broeckx in Musea van België. Koninklijk Museum voor Schone Kunsten te Antwerpen. Moderne meesters, 1958, nr. 5.
- Christien Oele, in Fatale vrouwen. 1860-1910, 2003, p. 158; Leen de Jong, in Openbaar Kunstbezit Vlaanderen 1971, p. 4-4b.
- Christien Oele, in Fatale vrouwen. 1860-1910, 2003, p. 158; Jan Lea Broeckx in Musea van België. Koninklijk Museum voor Schone Kunsten te Antwerpen. Moderne meesters, 1958, nr. 5.
- Christien Oele, in Fatale vrouwen. 1860-1910, 2003, p. 158; Topstukken, 2007.
- Leen de Jong, in Moderne Meesters in het Koninklijk Museum, 1992, nr. 6.
- Leen de Jong, in Openbaar Kunstbezit Vlaanderen 1971, p. 4-4b; Jan Lea Broeckx in Musea van België. Koninklijk Museum voor Schone Kunsten te Antwerpen. Moderne meesters, 1958, nr. 5; Topstukken, 2007.
