= Jean Pierre François Lamorinière =

Belgian painter

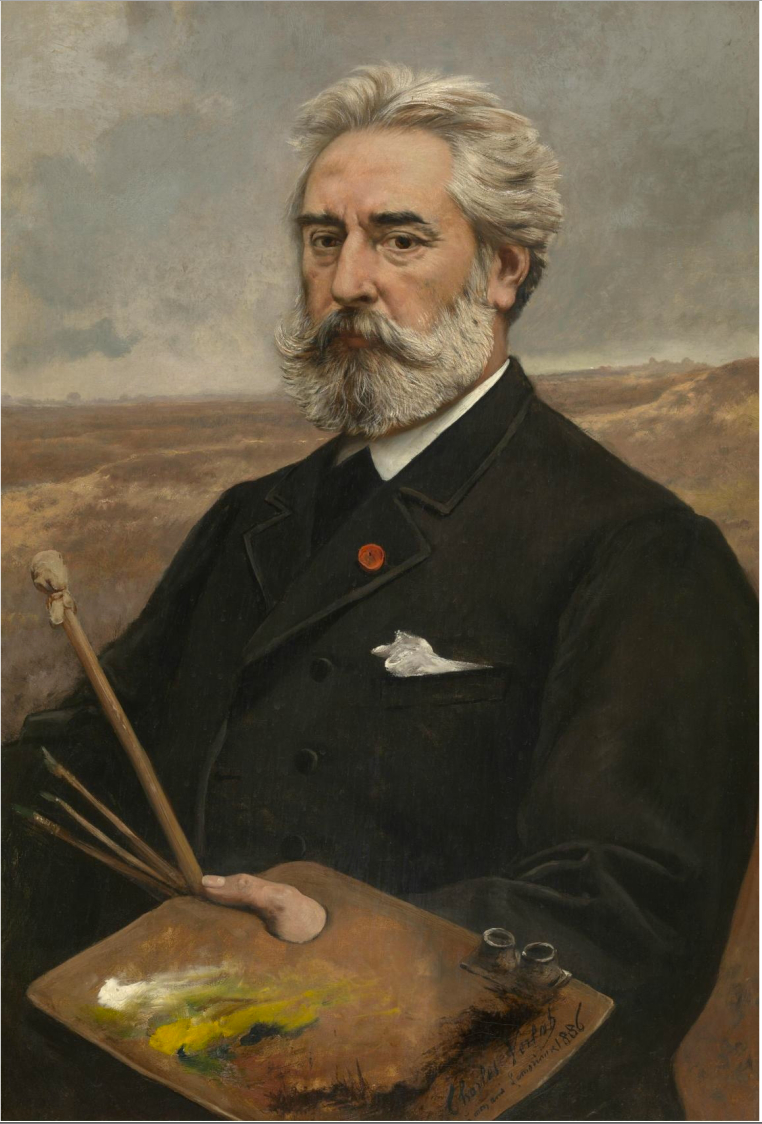
Jean Pierre François Lamorinière by Charles Verlat

Jean Pierre François Lamorinière, Jan Pieter Frans Lamorinière or François Lamorinière (20 April 1828, in Antwerp – 3 January 1911, in Antwerp) was a Belgian landscape painter best known for his realistic depictions of landscapes in his home country. His work is situated between the previous generation of the Romantic landscape painters and the Realist landscape.

== Life ==
Jean Pierre François Lamorinière's birth name was Joannes Petrus Franciscus Lamorinière. He was the son of Ioannes Petrus Franciscus Lamorinière and Maria Scholastica. His father was a sergeant major of the artillery in Antwerp.

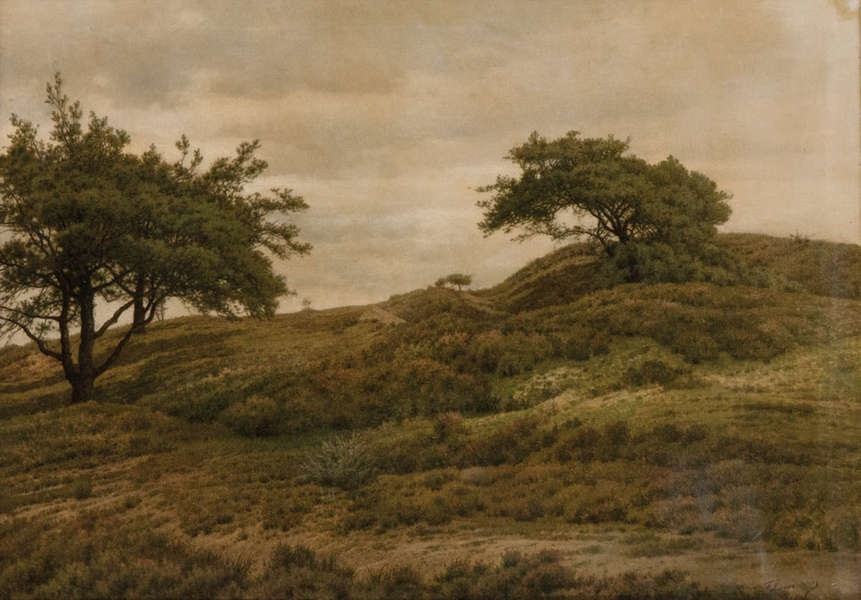
Heathland

Lamorinière commenced his studies at the Antwerp Academy of Fine Arts with the sculptor Joseph Geefs but after a few weeks he started to study in the studio of Emmanuel Noterman, a painter and printmaker known for his genre scenes with animals. He also studied under the prominent marine painter Jacob Jacobs known for his scenes of southern ports and landscapes. Lamorinière started to practice outdoor painting in the immediate vicinity of Antwerp. He exhibited his first work, a Sunset (now in the Walker Art Gallery, Liverpool) in Antwerp in 1848. He is believed to have worked some time in Barbizon, where the painters of the Barbizon school Théodore Rousseau and Jean-François Millet had made their homes and worked. It is not clear when or how long he stayed there but one work dated to 1854 is called Effect of the morning on a forest in Barbizon.

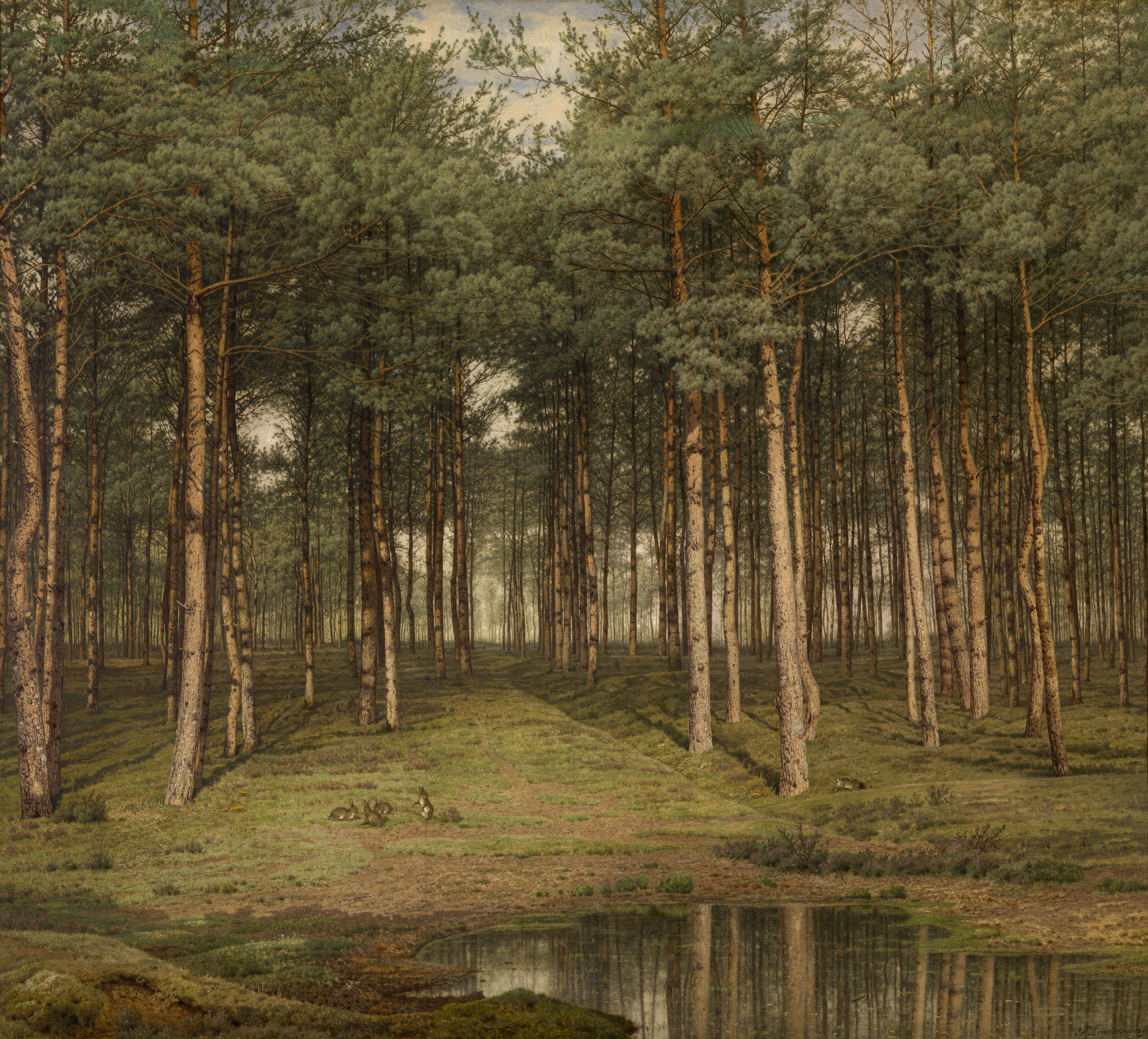
Fir forest in Putte

From the mid-1850s the artist starts to gain success thanks to the support of the Brussels art dealer Gustave Couteaux. The future Leopold II of Belgium purchased one of his works through Couteaux. In 1860 he was granted the Order of Leopold, a Belgian national honorary order of knighthood. He came into contact with the London-based Belgian dealer Mr. Gambart. He later visited England and around 1865 several paintings of the forest of Burnham near London by his hand are recorded.

In 1866 Lamorinière married Henriette Lavaux of 24 years old who was of French origin. The artist also starts to travel to find new subjects in Les Fagnes (1867), the banks of the Meuse (1868–1869), Germany (1869) and from the early 1870s he spent annually several months on the island Walcheren in the Netherlands. He exhibited in Vienna, Prague, Paris, Rotterdam and Amsterdam and painted in these locations when he travelled there. He returned often to paint in the border town of Putte, Kapellen where in the mid-1870s he acquired a residence called The Pavillion.

Jean Pierre François Lamorinière was among a large number of Antwerp artists who established the Association of Antwerp Etchers (Dutch: Vereeniging der Antwerpsche etsers, French: l'Association des aquafortistes anversois) in 1880. The Vereeniging published an annual album containing graphic works of its members.

Lamorinière lost his eyesight in 1898 and ceased to paint. He died in Antwerp on 3 January 1911.

== Work ==
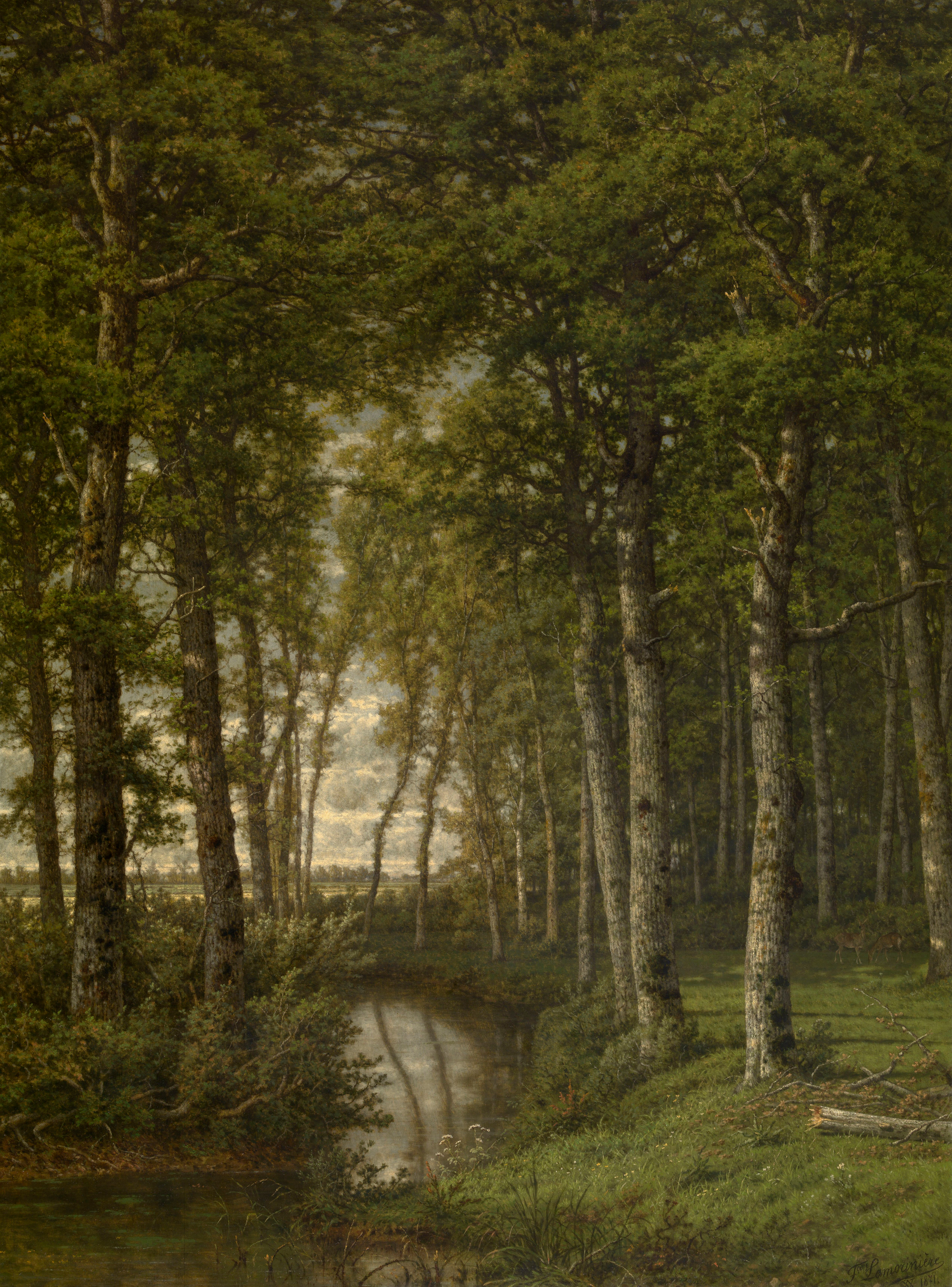
Loneliness. Landscape near Schilde

Jean Pierre François Lamorinière was a painter and etcher whose main subject matter was the landscape. He is regarded as a transitional figure in Belgian landscape painting between the Romanticism of Balthasar Paul Ommeganck and Eugène Joseph Verboeckhoven and later Realism. He painted his landscapes from nature based on his own observations. Even while his flat landscapes are derived from his direct observation of nature, Lamorinière did not just paint nature as he found it. He 'improved' on nature so that his compositions could meet the ideal spiritual image which he had of nature. This was reflected in the strict construction and detailed analysis of his compositions, which emphasized the static, and his smooth, meticulous style of painting. This approach is obvious in his Fir forest in Putte (1833, Royal Museum of Fine Arts Antwerp) with the strict lines of the stately rising tree trunks and the perspective effect of the trees' shadows. Lamorinière was passionate about trees and paid meticulous attention to every detail of their anatomy.

Important influences on his work were the Barbizon School as well as the landscape traditions of the Flemish and Dutch school. The landscapes of Joseph Lies also were an influence on his work. The artist preferred dark tones and usually depicted nature without any human presence.

A type of green pigment is named Lamorinière green after the colour of green pigment favoured by Jean Pierre François Lamorinière, which was produced by the firm Jacques Blockx Fils SA.

Lamorinière etched 24 plates, which were issued in 1874. The prints reveal the artist's grasp of the anatomy of trees and his attention to detail.
