= Edward Woutermaertens =

Belgian artist (1819–1897)

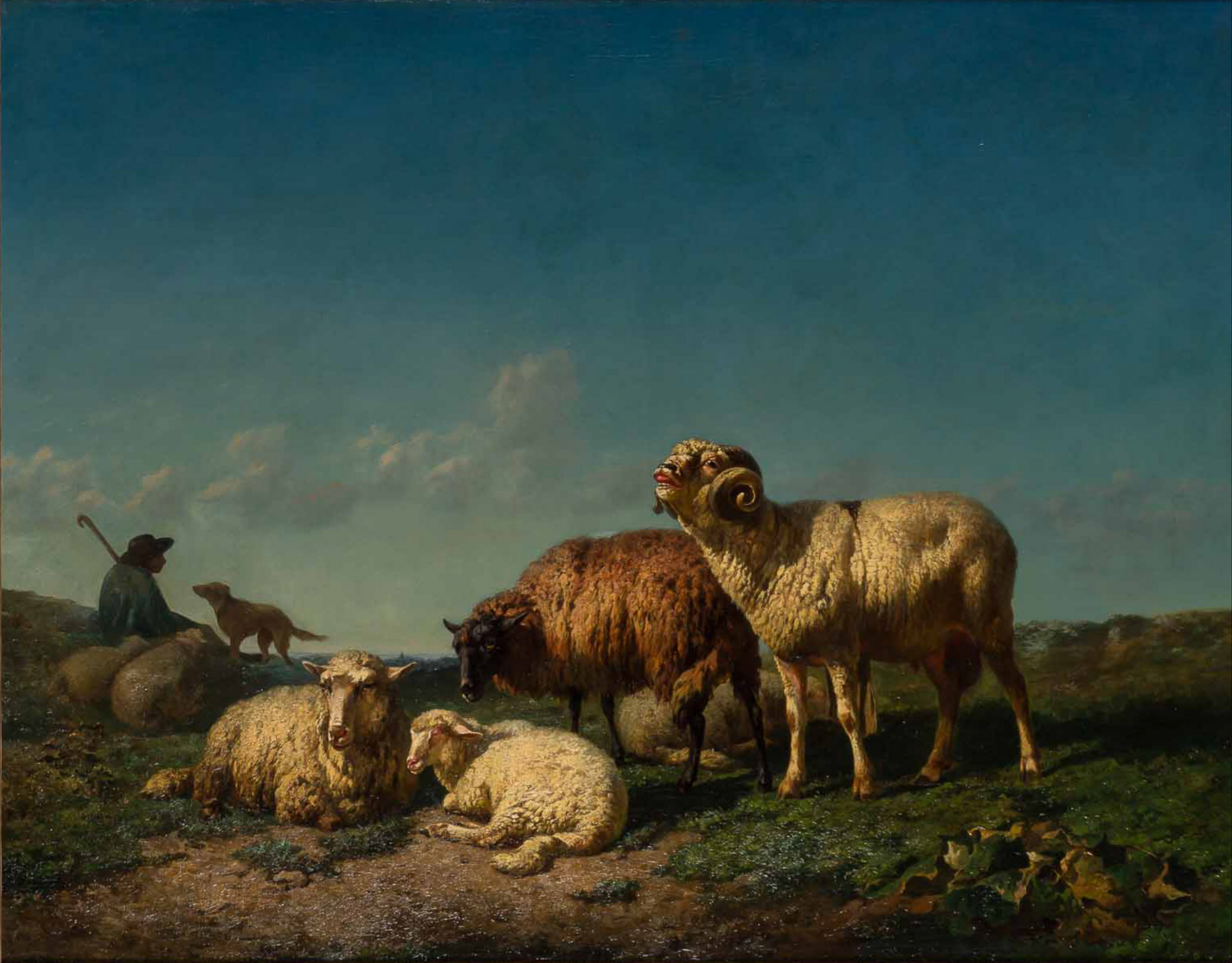
A shepherd and his flock at rest

Edward Woutermaertens or Edouard Woutermaertens (15 August 1819 – 30 October 1897) was a Belgian artist who specialized in the painting of scenes with animals, with a particular preference for sheep.

== Life ==
Edward Woutermaertens was born in Kortrijk, Belgium on 15 August 1819, a son of Lodewijk Frans, a goldsmith, and Marie Thérèse Seynaeve. His younger brother Constant also became a painter. He started to study in 1836 at the Academy of Kortrijk likely under Filip De Witte, a painter of portraits, genre scenes and biblical scenes. Among his fellow pupils were the brothers Hendrik and Edmond de Praetere (Pratere), who became well-known artists. After completing his academic training in 1840, he was a pupil of the animal painter Lodewijk or Louis Robbe for six years.

He married Camilla Dervaux and the couple had 9 children. He started painting dogs but gradually started drawing more inspiration from depicting sheep. He even kept his own flock of sheep, for which he had hired a shepherd. He became successful and had patrons locally, and in France and England. His works were accepted at various leading official salons, such as Kortrijk in 1841, in Bruges in 1846, in Brussels in 1845, 1848, 1852, 1875, 1878 and 1880, in Paris in 1855, 1866 and 1878 and in Boulogne-sur-Mer in 1870.

He was the teacher of the Kortrijk painters Vincent De Vos (1829-1875) en Valère Verheust (1841-1881). While he never taught at the Academy of Kortrijk, he was a regular member of the jury deciding on its year-end awards.

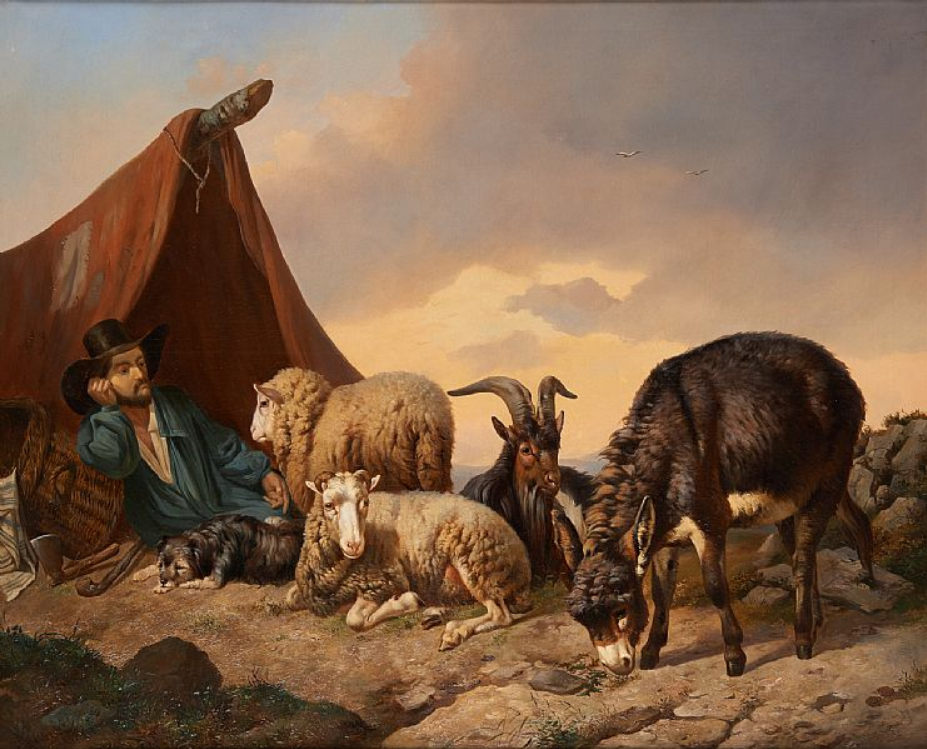
Shepherd, his dog and his sheep on a landscape background

He died in Kortrijk on 30 October 1897.

== Works ==
He was best known for his scenes of sheep grazing in a meadow or hilly landscape. As he was not always in the habit of signing his paintings or only put his initials, it is not always easy to make firm attributions of his works. He was influenced by the animal scenes of Louis Robbe and Eugène Joseph Verboeckhoven. Like them, he worked in a realistic style. In addition, the paintings of the French landscape painter Constant Troyon (1810-1865) were an important influence on his work, in particular Troyon's realism and use of bright colors for clouds. He depicted his animal subjects with a lot of detail and accuracy.

Both in Belgium and in France, even before 1850 most animal painters started to pay more attention to the setting in which animals were depicted by placing them in their natural environment or in their stables. In line with this trend, Woutermaertens worked en plein air and often explored the Belgian coast region and especially the region of Veurne as the setting for his animal subjects. The landscape in his compositions does not function as a decorative element, but is a key part of the action. He paid great attention to the lighting to create a certain mood. His animals are typically depicted in an open landscape, which was suffused with sunlight, giving the animal scenes a fresh and natural appearance. In addition to sheep, he also painted dogs.
