= Emmanuel Noterman =

Belgian painter

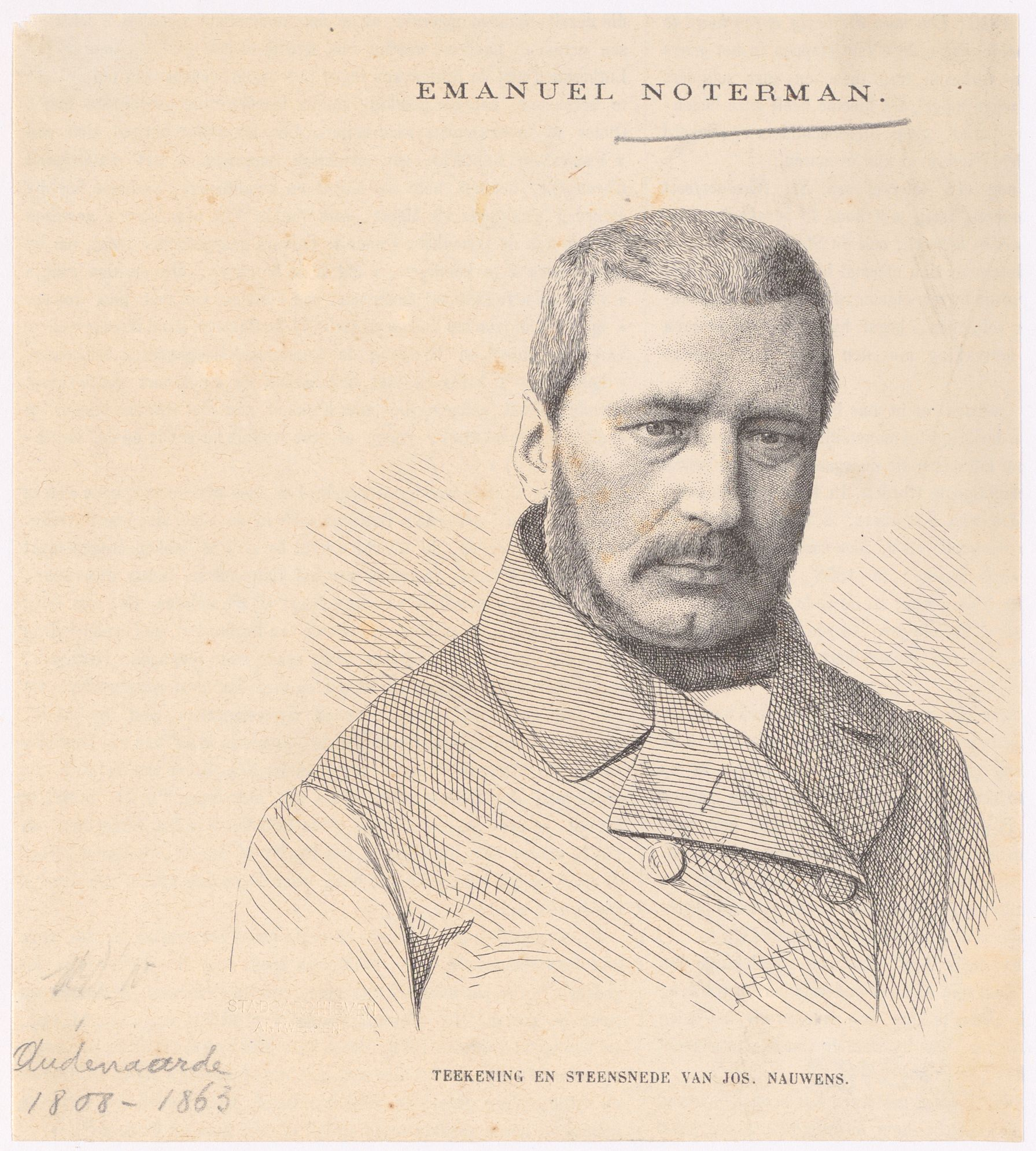
- Emmanuel Noterman, by Joseph Nauwens
- Born: Emmanuel Noterman; April 1808; Oudenaarde, First French Empire
- Died: 14 May 1863 (aged 55); Antwerp, belgium
- Education: Academy of Fine Arts of Ghent
- Occupation: Painter

Emmanuel Noterman (April 1808 – 14 May 1863) was a Belgian painter and printmaker known for his genre scenes, in particular his scenes with monkeys engaging in human activities (the so-called singeries), as well as for his paintings of dogs.

== Life ==
Emmanuel Noterman was born in Oudenaarde as the son of a decorative painter. He was initially also trained in the craft of gilding. The young Emmanuel received the first artistic notions from his maternal grandfather, Bernard Durieux, a lawyer and amateur painter. Noterman continued his art studies at the Academy of Fine Arts of Ghent under the guidance of Maes-Canini. He devoted himself initially to portrait painting, first in Geraardsbergen and then in Brussels.

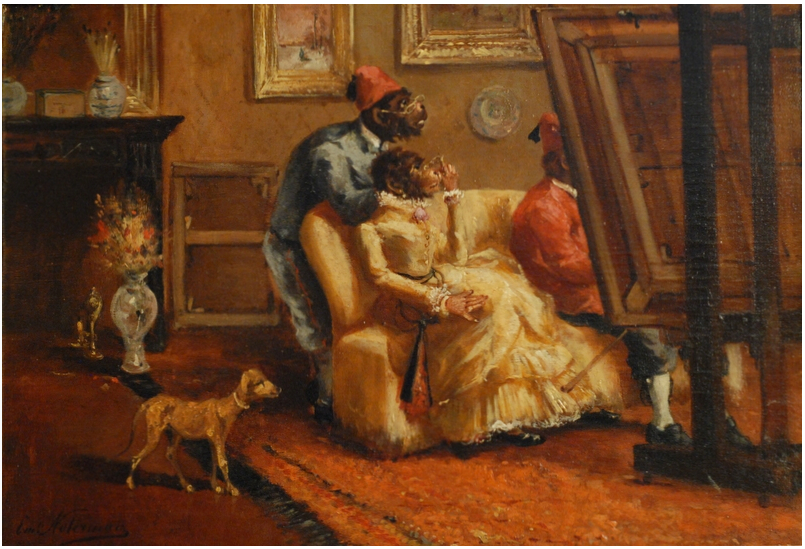
The art experts

In 1835 Noterman moved to Antwerp, where, under the guidance and with the advice of Pierre Kremer, he changed to the painting of genre scenes. He achieved a certain level of success with his humorous scenes. He sent his paintings to various Belgian salons and was lauded for his contribution to the 1836 salon in Brussels with a composition entitled Preparations for the masked ball.

Noterman trained a few students, of whom the best-known are Jean Pierre François Lamorinière, Ernest Slingeneyer and Jan Stobbaerts. His younger brother Zacharie Noterman also studied painting and etching with Emmanuel. Like his brother, Zacharie would establish himself as an animal artist and specialized in particular in singeries.

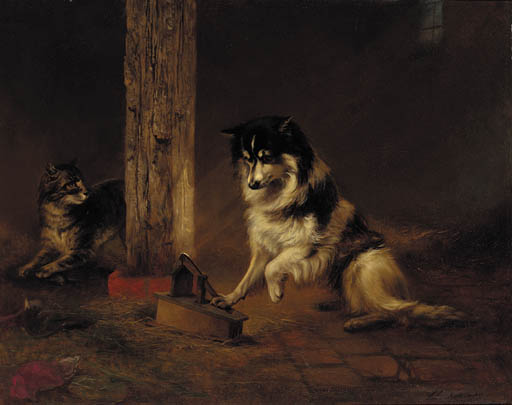
Teamwork

Like many other artists in Antwerp at the time such as Joseph Lies and Ernest Slingeneyer, Noterman became a member of the loge of freemasons La Persévérance.

Noterman died in Antwerp on 14 May 1863.

== Work ==
Noterman started painting portraits but quickly moved to genre scenes and then animal paintings. His representations of dogs were particularly well prized.

Noterman also painted multiple scenes with cats and dogs. Noterman created a number of singeries, paintings and etchings of monkeys engaging in human activities. The monkeys were often dressed in costumes which added comedy to the 'aping' by the monkeys of a specific human action (often vices) or occupation. Noterman occasionally painted the animals in the landscapes of the Antwerp landscape painter Jean Pierre François Lamorinière.

Noterman is the author of several etchings.
