= Charles Verlat =

Belgian painter (1824–1890)

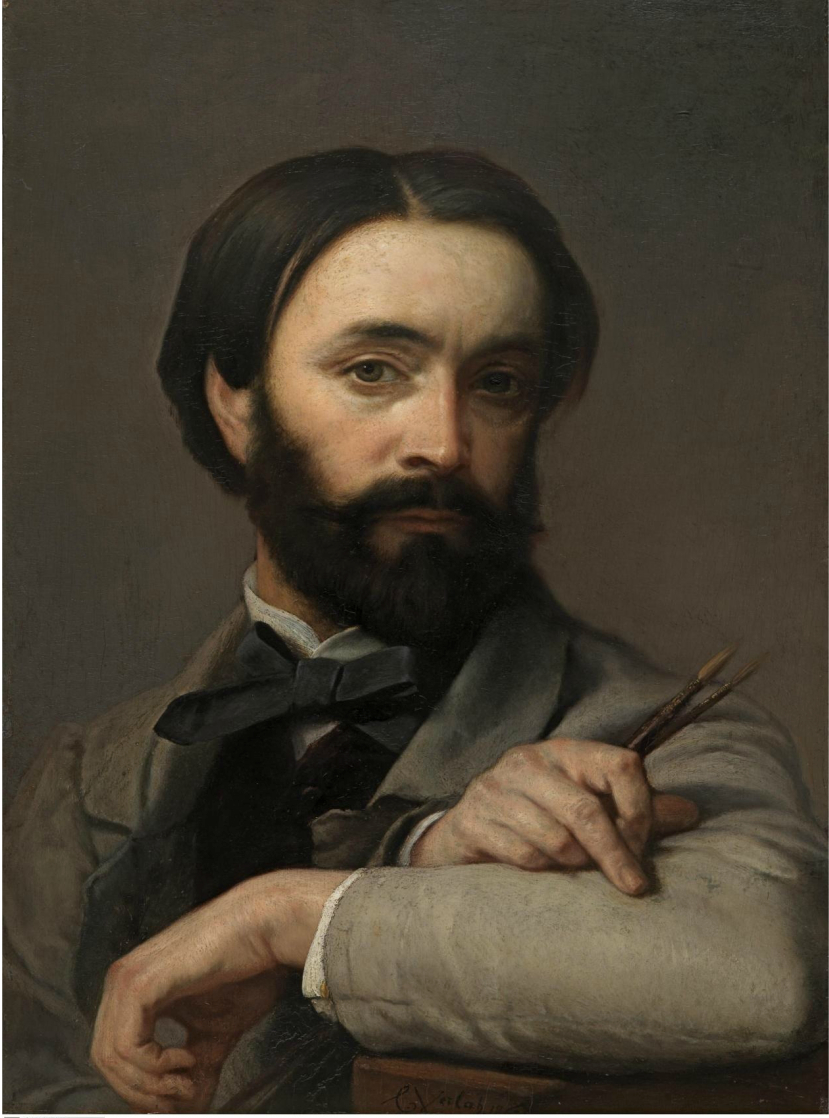
- Self-portrait of Charles Verlat, 1865
- Born: Michael Maria Carolus Verlat; 25 November 1824; Antwerp, United Kingdom of the Netherlands
- Died: 23 October 1890 (aged 65); Antwerp, Belgium
- Known for: Painting, art education

Charles Verlat or Karel Verlat (25 November 1824 – 23 October 1890) was a Belgian painter, watercolorist, engraver (printmaker), art educator and director of the Antwerp Academy. He painted many subjects and was particularly known as an animalier and portrait painter. He also created Orientalist works, genre scenes, including a number of singeries, religious compositions and still lifes. He was a professor of drawing and director of the Antwerp Academy when Vincent van Gogh spent a brief period as a student at the Academy in 1886. The two men got into arguments about van Gogh's unconventional style of drawing.

== Life ==
He was born in Antwerp as the son of a manufacturer of soap, oil and soda. His mother arranged for the young Charles to get his first drawing classes from the Dutch sculptor Johannes Antonius van der Ven, who was then studying at the Antwerp Academy. From an early age he lived for art. He left formal school education at the early age of fourteen and was accepted together with Godfried Guffens to take lessons at the private studio located in the Vleeshuis of Nicaise de Keyser. De Keyser was one of the key figures in the Belgian Romantic-historical school of painting. At the time de Keyser had about 30 pupils including some who came to prominence such as Edouard Hamman, Jan Swerts, Joseph Lies and Johan Bernard Wittkamp. At the same time Verlat followed courses at the Antwerp Academy where he studied, among others, with Gustave Wappers and Josephus Laurentius Dyckmans.

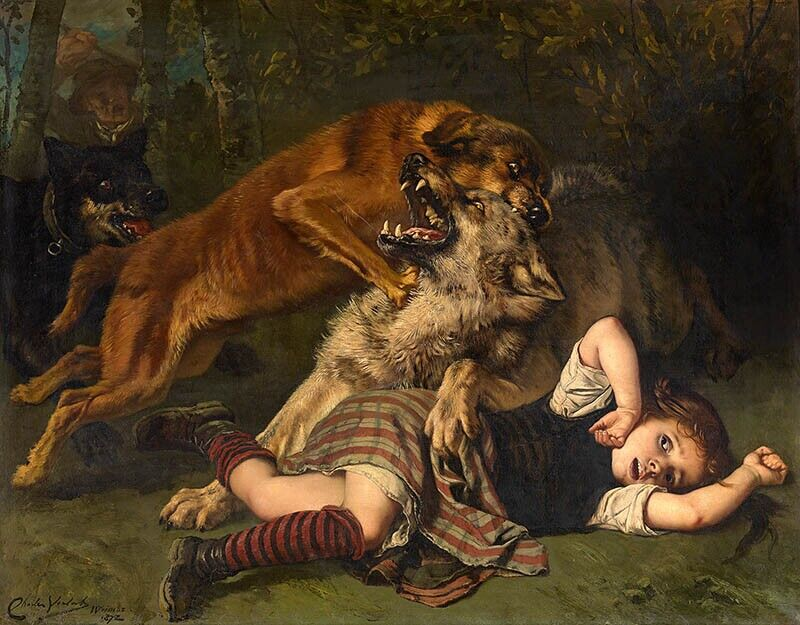
Saved in the nick of time

He started participating in the salons of his time and in 1843 sent his first important picture, Pippin the Short Killing a Lion to the Antwerp triennial salon. His first paintings were inspired by the Belgian Romantic school and dealt with important events from Belgian history. He also gradually started to paint animal scenes as well as genre scenes. In 1849, he painted his first religious composition which was intended for the St Gummarus church in Lier. He participated in the Prix de Rome of Belgium in 1847 but was not successful, possible as the result of his partial incapacitation due to a broken arm. Fortunately, a wealthy relative called Albert Marnef van Wespelaer provided him in 1849 with a stipend that allowed him to continue his studies for four years.

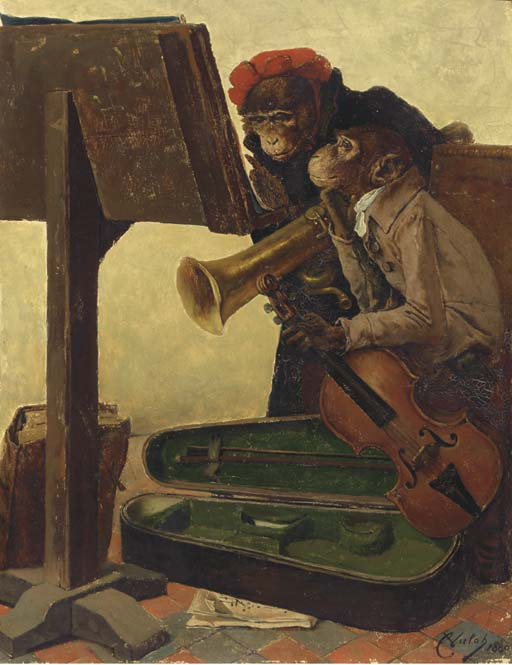
Musical monkeys

He left for Paris in 1850 and studied there first in the studio of the Dutch painter Ary Scheffer. Later he studied with Jean-Hippolyte Flandrin at the Académie des Beaux-Arts. From 1852 he had his own studio in Paris. He gained commissions from religious and official institutions in Belgium including the commission from the Antwerp city government for the large historical composition Godefroid de Bouillon during the assault on Jerusalem (1854, Royal Museums of Fine Arts of Belgium). In 1855 he won a gold medal at the Exposition Universelle at Paris with his Tiger Attacking a Herd of Buffaloes.

He gradually came under the influence of the Realism of Gustave Courbet. This resulted in his 1857 work Coup de collier (now in the Royal Museum of Fine Arts in Antwerp) showing two horses struggling to pull a heavy cart loaded with bricks while being whipped by their handlers. Despite its vivid depiction and dynamic form, the large-scale work failed to achieve the success its creator had hoped for. When he exhibited it at the 1857 Paris Salon the work was mocked in the French magazine Le Charivari with a cartoon showing men helping to push a very heavy cart out of the Salon and the text "Le public poussant à la roue pour aider la charrette à sortir de l’Exposition de peinture" (The public pushing the wheel to help the cart leave the painting exhibition). The work was also sharply criticized by Le Figaro's art critic Jean Rousseau who wrote that the work only was good enough for use as a shop sign for a removal company. Verlat took revenge by painting a monkey shaving itself while wiping its feet on the copy of the newspaper in which the criticism had been published. He returned for a year to Antwerp to return the next year to work in his studio in Paris. During this time he started to establish a reputation as an animal painter. He also painted religious subjects and his Pietà of 1866 was so successful that it earned him the distinction of being appointed a knight in the French Legion of Honour.

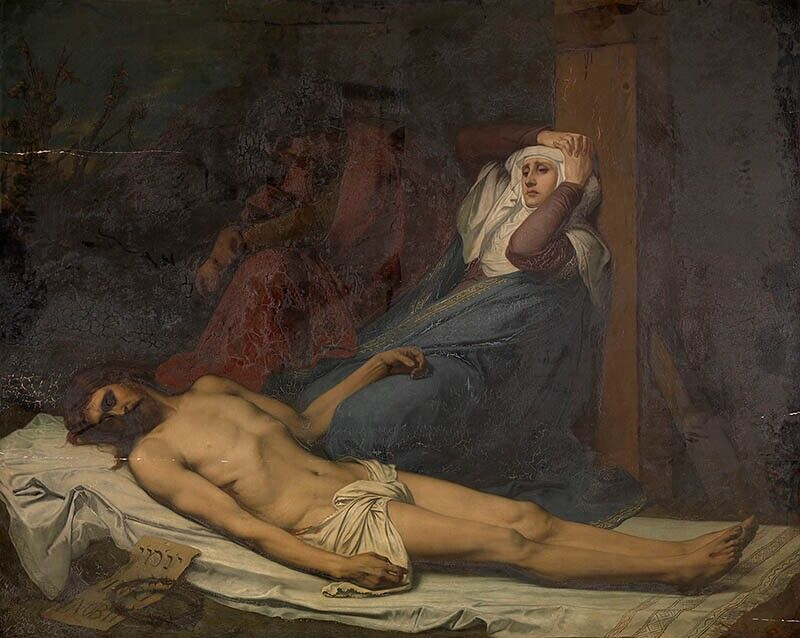
Pietà

In 1869, he left Paris to take up the invitation of Charles Alexander, Grand Duke of Saxe-Weimar-Eisenach to establish a painting class at the Grand-Ducal Saxon Art School set up by the Grand Duke. Max Liebermann was one of his students in his painting class. He was very appreciated by the Grand Duke and taught art classes to the daughters of the Grand Duke. He became later the acting head of the Art School. The Grand Duke also bestowed on him the Order of the White Falcon. During this period he was active as a portrait painter. He moved in the cultural circles of Weimar and was friends with Franz Liszt whose portrait he painted. They would stay in touch and later Verlat would be instrumental in Liszt's visit to Antwerp in 1881.

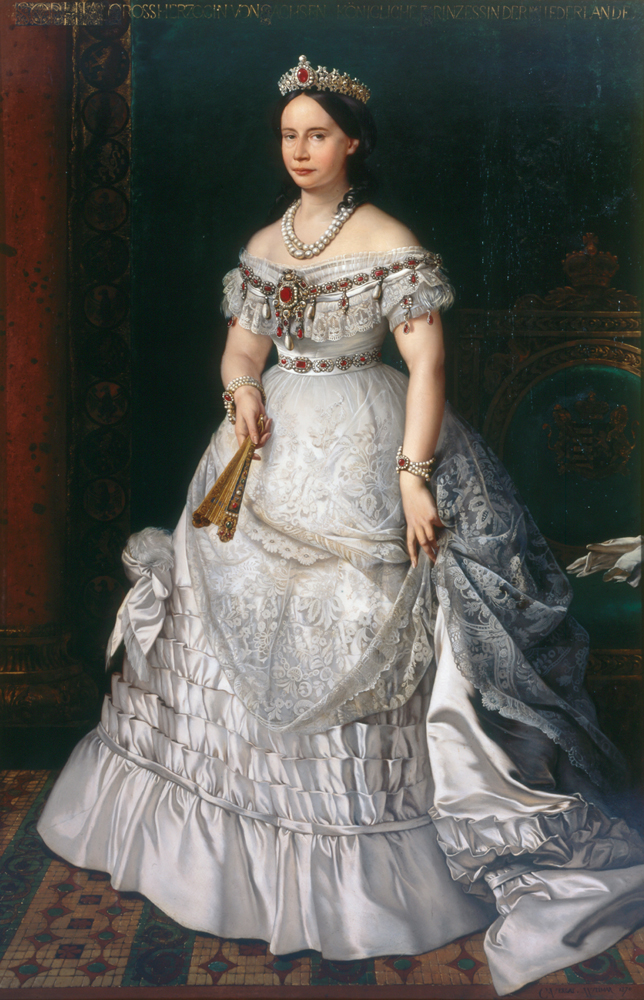
Portrait of Princess Sophie of the Netherlands

In August 1875 Verlat left his official positions in Weimar and traveled to Cairo where he stayed for six months. He then moved on to Jerusalem where he would reside for two years. He traveled throughout Palestine and painted the people, animals and landscapes. He seems to have been motivated by a desire to study the real life of the people who formed the subjects of his religious paintings. His major creations during this time included large-scale religious compositions Vox populi (1876, St. Lawrence Church, Alkmaar), Vox Dei (1877, Royal Museum of Fine Arts, Antwerp), The Tomb of Christ and The Flight into Egypt.

Verlat returned to Antwerp in 1877. He exhibited the paintings he had created in Palestine in various locations, including in Weimar, Antwerp, Brussels and London. He also built a wooden shed on a vacant lot in the Twaalf Maandenstraat in Antwerp, immediately next to the Handelsbeurs to exhibit these paintings. It was later used to exhibit or auction off works of other artists. Verlat also sent his Palestine paintings to the Exposition Universelle in Paris in 1878. The works were received with enthusiasm. He been called back to Antwerp by the Belgian government to take up the position of professor of painting at the Antwerp Academy which had become vacant with the death of Jozef Van Lerius in 1878. He was also offered a seat on the board of the Academy to replace Nicaise de Keyser upon his retirement. When Nicaise de Keyser resigned in 1879, Verlat decided to let his old teacher Joseph Geefs take up the role. As a result, Verlat only became a member of the board in 1885. His students during this period included Edward Arthur Fellowes Prynne, the British Pre-Raphaelite painter, whose early works are clearly influenced by Verlat. In 1881 Verlat was made Commander in the Order of Leopold.

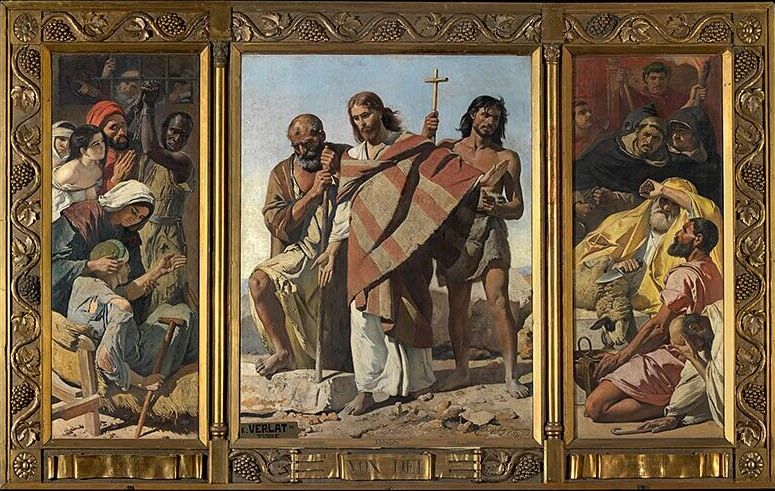
Vox Dei

At the time, panoramic paintings, large artworks that show a wide, all-encompassing view of a particular subject such as a landscape, military battle or other historical event, were all the rage in Europe. Verlat also created a few panoramic paintings. In Antwerp he first created the Battle of Waterloo in 1881. This work was 120 meters wide and 10 meters high. The whole scene also included plaster figures that enlivened the experience. The next year he created for a Russian organisation another panorama showing a Review of the Russian soldiers after the signing of the Treaty of San Stefano before Constantinopel. He executed this work with the assistance of his pupils. In 1883 he was commissioned with decorating the stairwell of the Antwerp City Hall. Of the four historical paintings he planned to install only one showing The Duke of Alva's statue dragged through the streets of Antwerp was finished at the time of his death. During this period he made many portraits, animal paintings, religious compositions and decorations for the palace of Prince Philippe, Count of Flanders in Brussels.

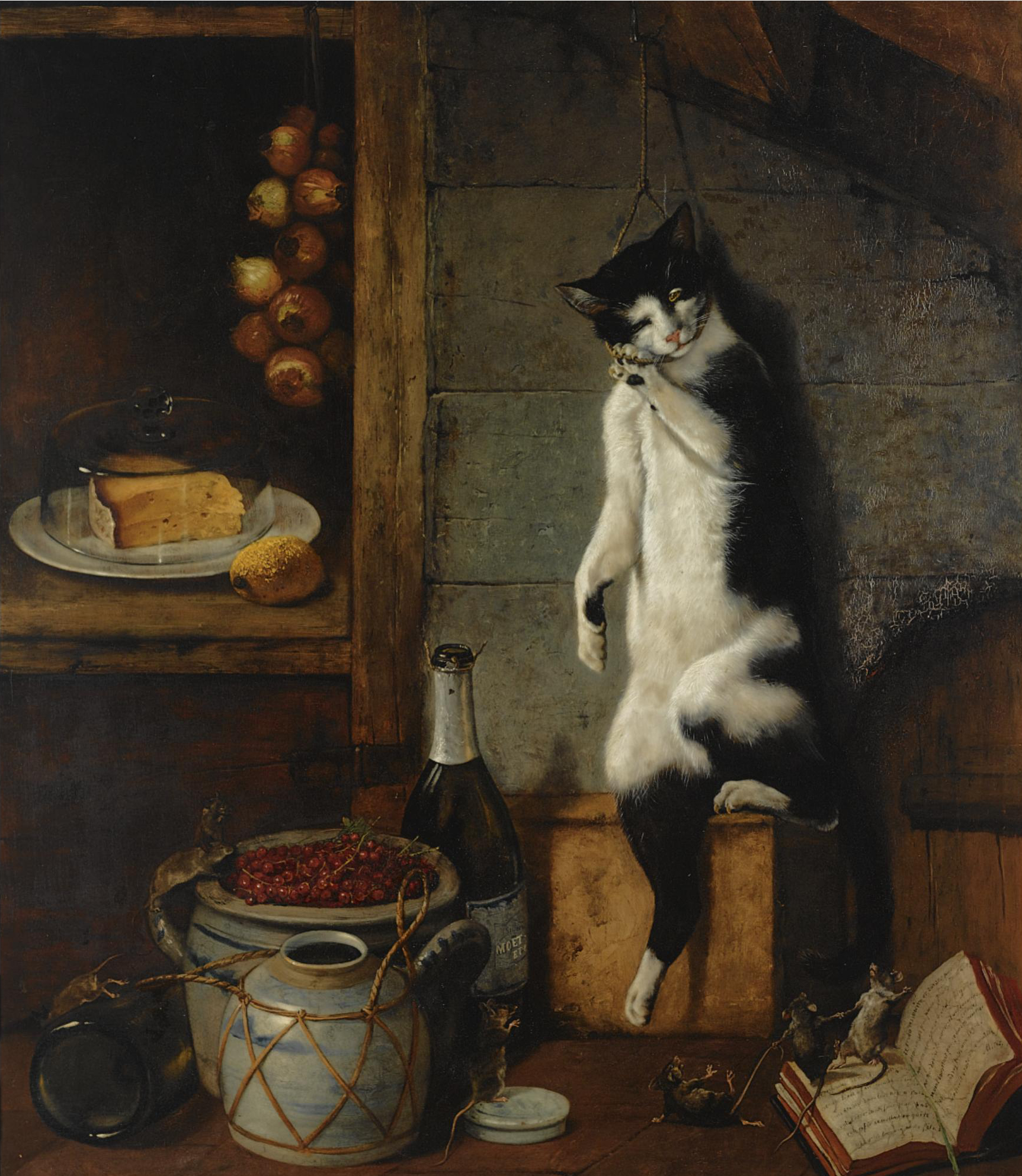
The unfortunate cat

In January 1886 the Dutch painter Vincent van Gogh matriculated in painting and drawing at the Antwerp Academy. He started to attend drawing classes after plaster models at the Antwerp Academy on 18 January 1886. He quickly got into trouble with Verlat, the then director of the Academy and teacher of a painting class, because of his unconventional painting style. Van Gogh had also clashed with the instructor of the drawing class Franz Vinck. Verlat organised for van Gogh to attend the drawing classes after antique plaster models given by Eugène Siberdt. Soon Siberdt and van Gogh also came into conflict and there was a confrontation between the two men when van Gogh made a drawing after the Venus de Milo making her look like the limbless, naked torso of a Flemish peasant woman. Van Gogh ceased to attend classes after the confrontation. On 31 March 1886, which was about a month after the confrontation with Siberdt, the teachers of the Academy decided that 17 students, including van Gogh, had to repeat a year. The story that van Gogh was expelled from the Academy by Siberdt is therefore unfounded. Verlat taught many other international pupils at the Academy including the illustrator Joseph Finnemore, Joseph Malachy Kavanagh and John Duncan.

Although he was hard-working and his works commanded a high price in the market, Verlat became indebted because of the high costs of organizing exhibitions of his works, the creation of the panoramas and a big loss on the Russian panorama, which was never paid. Even the financial assistance provided by his powerful friends could not save him from the pressure by his creditors and he was forced to pawn his artworks.

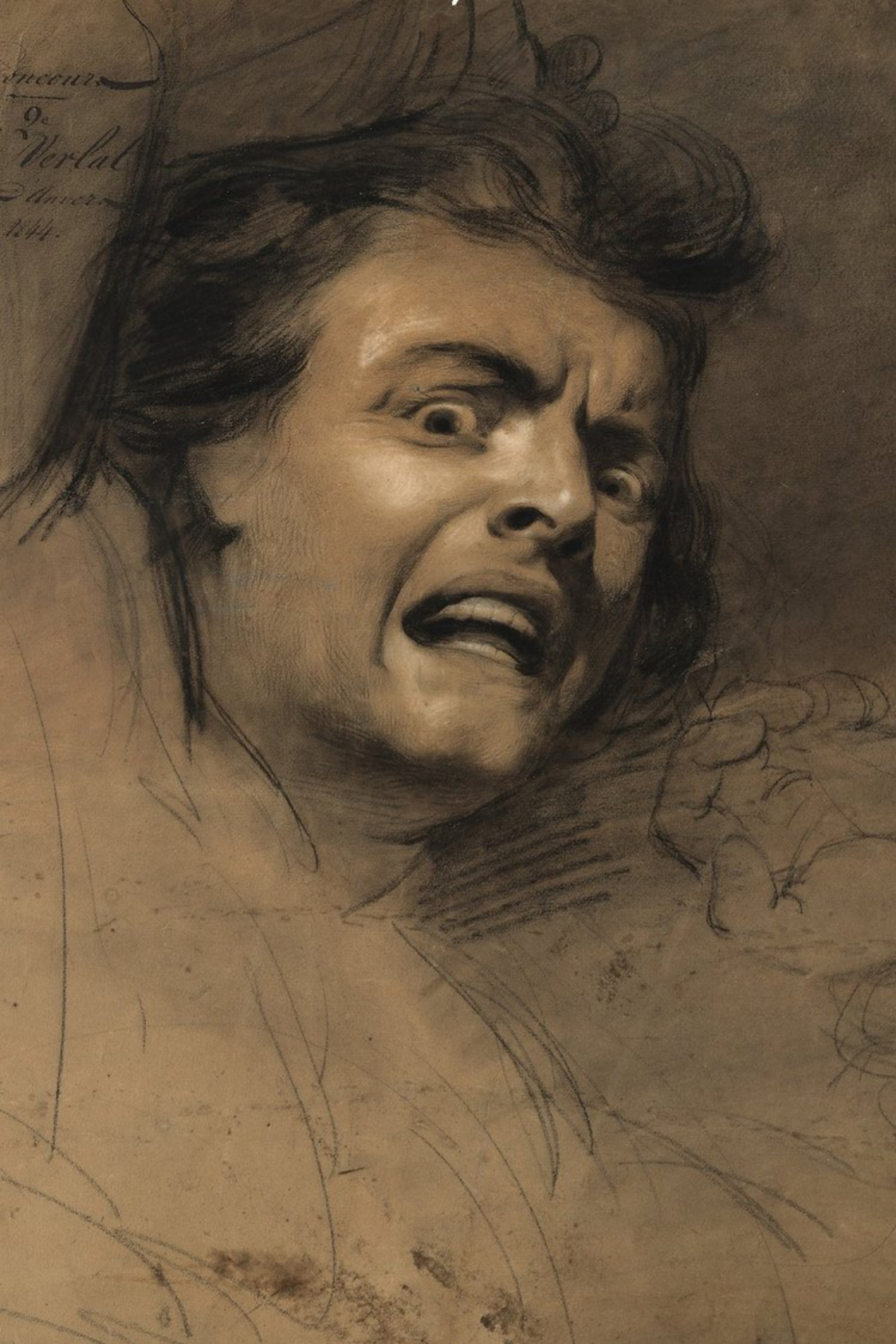
Tronie or Self Portrait as a Man in Terror, 1844

Verlat became involved in the reorganisation of art education in Antwerp and the establishment of the Hoger Instituut voor Schone Kunsten (Higher Institute for the Arts) which was to take over some of the tasks of art education in Antwerp. It had the effect of diminishing the role of the Academy of Antwerp and of its director Verlat. He tried to maintain a more important role for the Academy but was only partially successful. In the controversy that ensued, he made many enemies. All of these troubles were a serious burden on the artist. His health declined and in 1890 he had a stroke which partially paralysed him. Unable to regain his strength he died in Antwerp on 23 October 1890. He was buried two days later on the Kielkerhof and two years later a bust created by his friend Jules Pecher was placed on the grave.

== Work ==
Verlat was a versatile artist who practised painting, watercolor and etching. He also was an avid draughtsman. His subject matter was wide-ranging and included animal paintings, portraits, religious compositions, Orientalist works, genre scenes, including a number of singeries, and some still lifes. He was initially influenced by the professors of the Antwerp Academy who were important proponents of the Belgian Romantic school and preached a return to the glorious Flemish Baroque style to treat important events in Belgium's history. He was later influenced by other contemporary art movements: the German Idealists whom he knew through Ary Scheffer in Paris and the Realism of Gustave Courbet. During his stay in Palestine his palette became muted and lost its Flemish bluster. Despite these many influences, his main inspiration was the work of the Flemish Baroque masters Rubens, van Dyck and Jordaens. He regained his more colorful palette after his return to Antwerp.

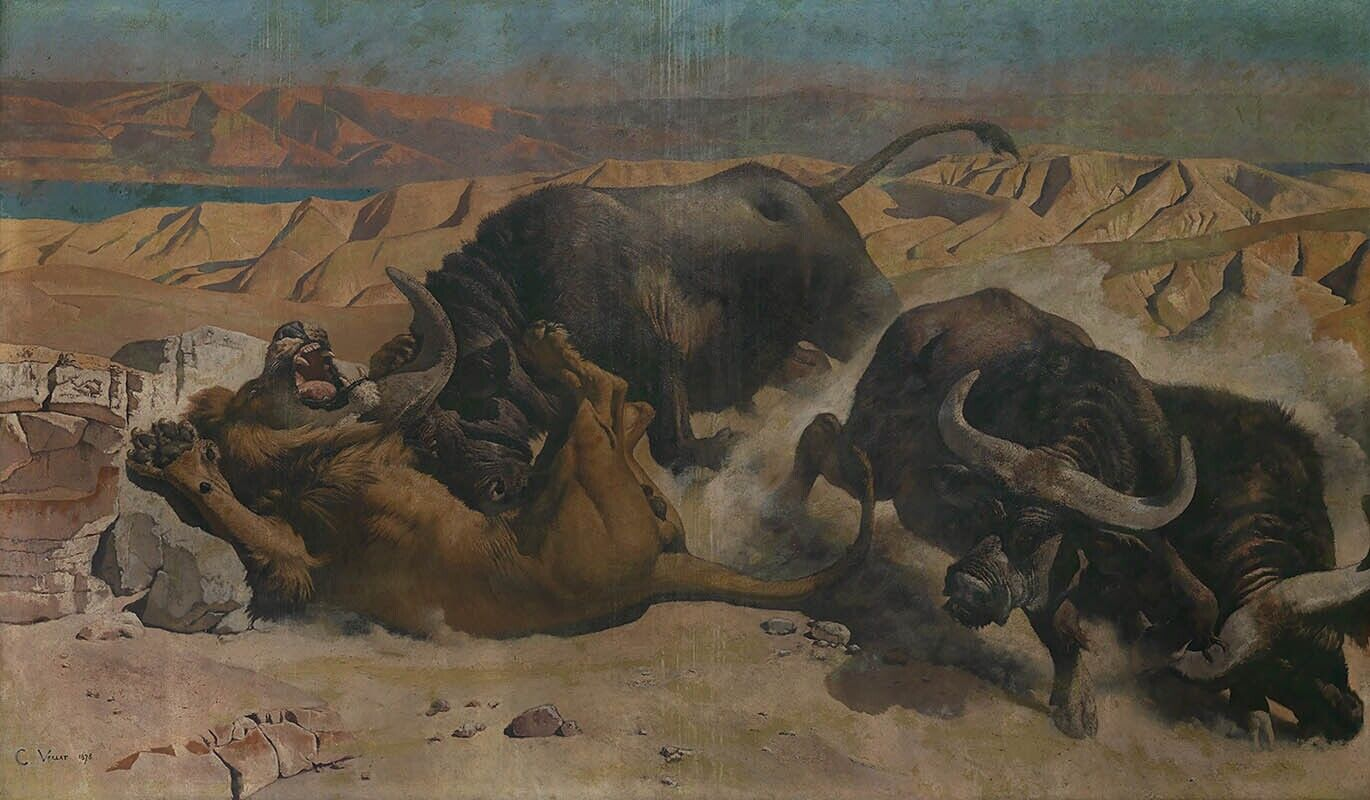
The defense of the herd

During his lifetime he was recognised as an important animal painter. He was able to render animals in a lively and realistic manner. One of his early animal works was acquired by the English animal painter Edwin Landseer. One of the best known examples of his art in this area is The defense of the herd (1878, Royal Museum of Fine Arts Antwerp). Painted during his Palestine residence it has the muted palette that he adopted during this period. It shows the kind of dynamic representation of animals only interactions that can be seen in the animal paintings of earlier Flemish animaliers such as Frans Snyders. Verlat painted many works in the genre of the singeries, i.e. humoristic renderings of monkeys engaging in human activities. The monkeys in the scenes are often dressed in costumes which adds comedy to their 'aping' of a specific human action (often a vice such as smoking or gambling) or occupation such as art critic, dentist, painter, musician etc.

He created some original etchings in the early 1880s, including a self-portrait. He worked directly on the plate without other preparation which gives these works a spontaneous feel.
