= Singerie =

Humans portrayed by Monkeys

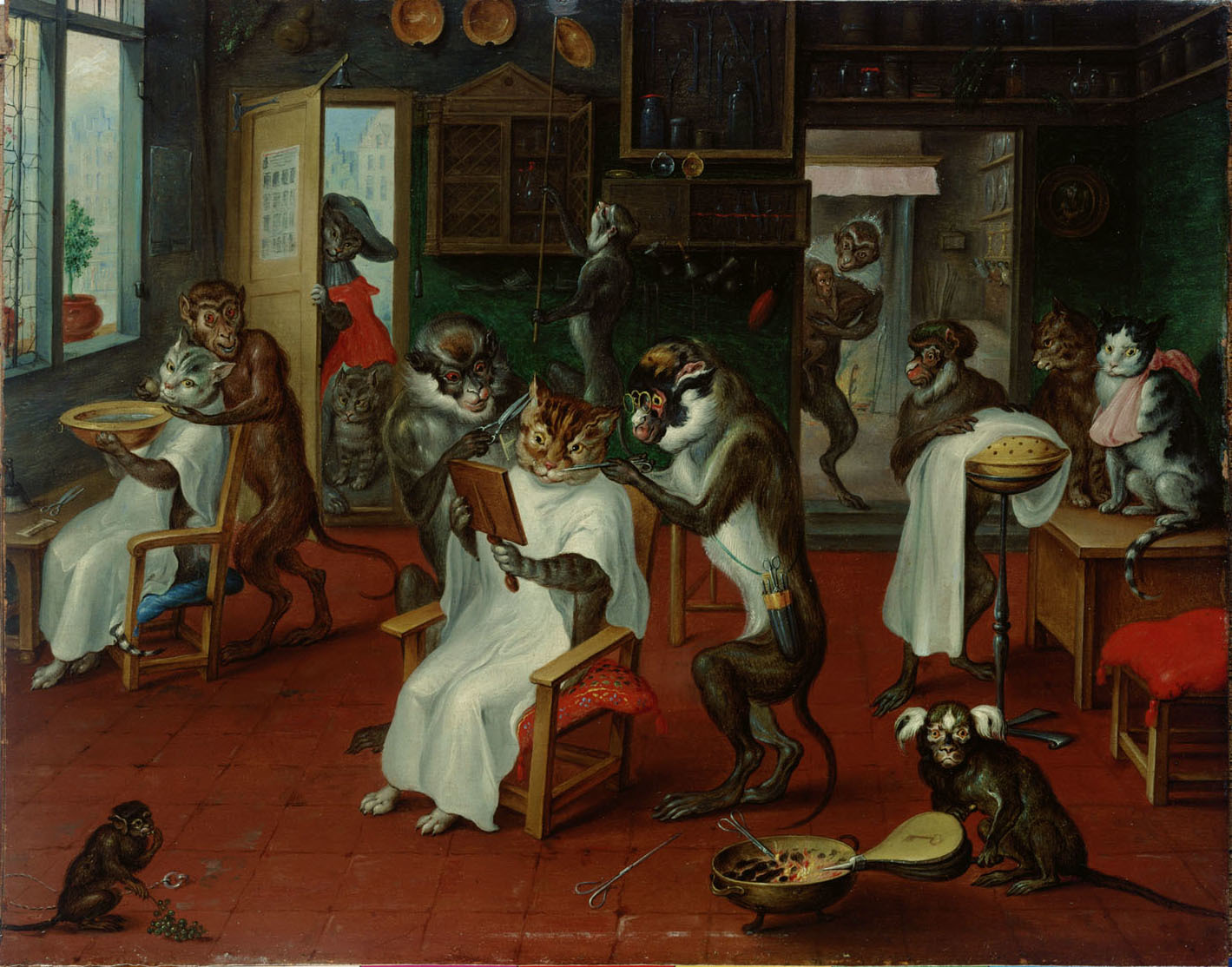
Barbershop with monkeys and cats, Abraham Teniers, mid-17th century

Singerie is the name given to a visual arts genre depicting monkeys imitating human behavior, often fashionably attired, intended as a diverting sight, using satire. The term is derived from the French word for "Monkey Trick".

Though it has a long history, the height of the genre was in the 18th century, in the Rococo.

== History ==
The practice can be traced as far back as Ancient Egypt; Cyril Aldred detected a love of singerie that he found characteristic of the late Eighteenth Dynasty of Egypt; Throughout the medieval period in Europe, monkeys were seen "as a symbol of downgraded humanity", and were used to mimic man and his foibles, often appearing in the margins of illuminated manuscripts.

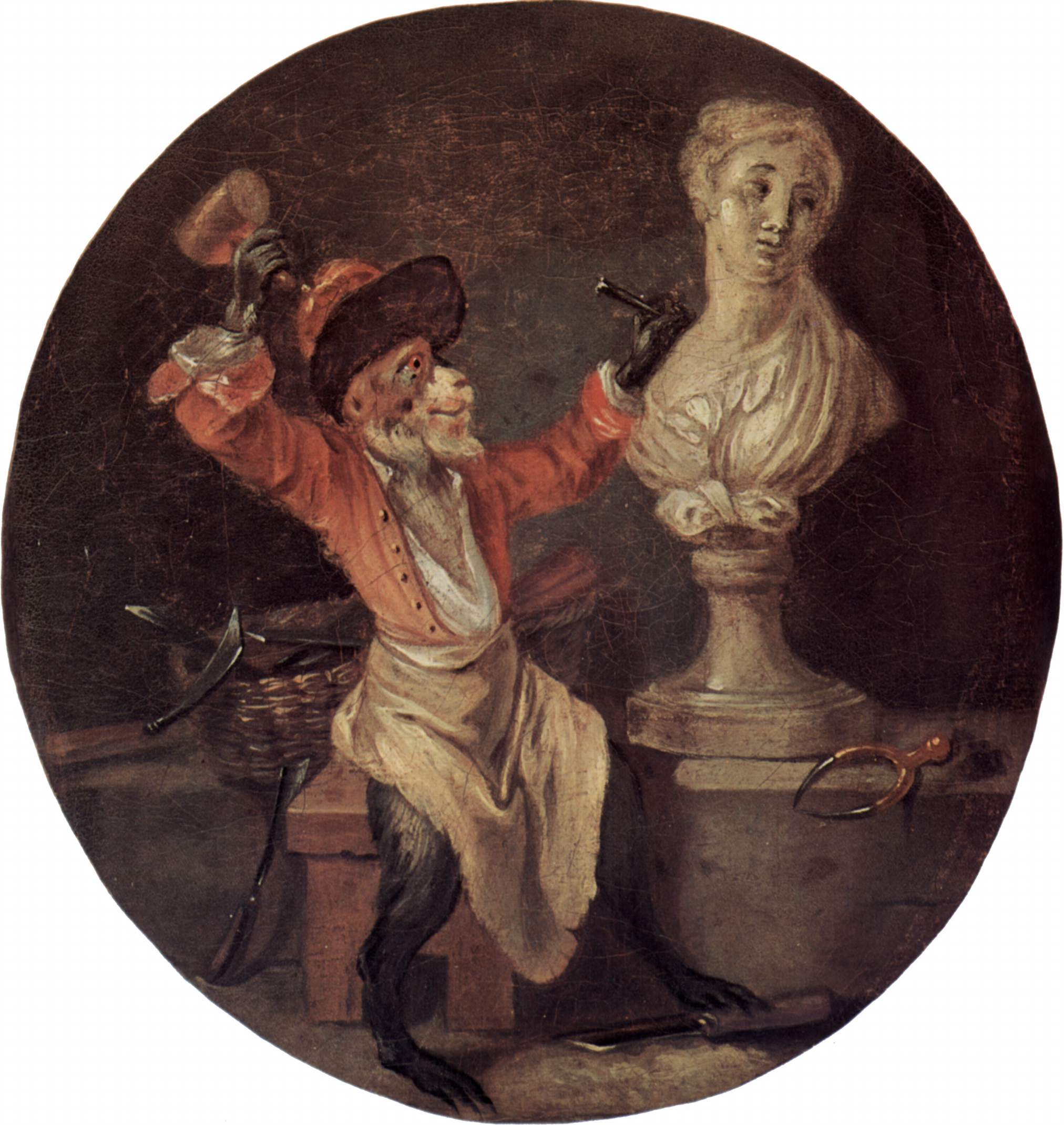
A copy of The Monkey Sculptor, by Antoine Watteau, c. 1710

Comical scenes with monkeys appearing in human attire and a human environment originated as a pictorial genre in Flemish prints in the 16th century and were further developed in paintings from the 17th century onwards. The Flemish engraver Pieter van der Borcht introduced the singerie as an independent theme around 1575 in a series of prints, which are strongly embedded in the artistic tradition of Pieter Bruegel the Elder, whose small 1562 Two Monkeys was a predecessor. The main precursors to the Singeries are earlier depictions of a sleeping man being robbed by several monkeys, often portrayed as a merchant, which first appeared in 1340. These prints were widely disseminated and the theme was then picked up by Flemish painters, at first by those in Antwerp such as Frans Francken the Younger, Jan Brueghel the Elder and the Younger, Sebastiaen Vrancx and Jan van Kessel the Elder. David Teniers the Younger became the principal practitioner of the genre and developed it further with his younger brother Abraham Teniers. The two brothers were able to cater to the prevailing taste in the art market and were thus instrumental in spreading the genre outside Flanders. Later in the 17th century artists like Nicolaes van Verendael, principally known as a painter of flower still lifes started to paint "monkey scenes" as well.

Singeries became popular among French artists in the early 18th century. French decorator and designer Jean Berain the Elder included dressed figures of monkeys in many wall decorations, the great royal ébéniste André Charles Boulle used them in his work and Watteau painted The Monkey Sculptor, a critique of art and artists' habit of "aping" nature.

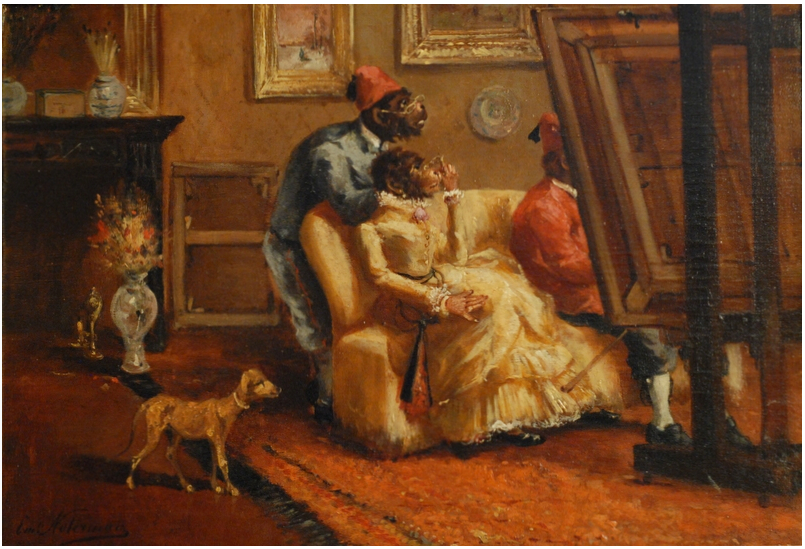
The art experts by Emmanuel Noterman

A complete monkey orchestra, the "Monkey Band" (Affenkapelle, "ape orchestra" in German) was produced in Meissen porcelain, and copied by Chelsea porcelain and other factories. In France the most famous such rococo decor are Christophe Huet's Grande Singerie and Petite Singerie decors at the Château de Chantilly, the basis for the Meissen figures. In England the French painter Andieu de Clermont is also known for his singeries: the most famous decorates the ceiling of the Monkey Room at Monkey Island Hotel, located on Monkey Island in Bray-on-Thames, England. The Grade I listed buildings, which have housed guests since 1840 were built in the 1740s by Charles Spencer, 3rd Duke of Marlborough.

Singeries regained popularity in the 19th century and artists then successful in this genre included Zacharie Noterman, Emmanuel Noterman, Charles Verlat, Sir Edwin Henry Landseer, Edmund Bristow, Alexandre-Gabriel Decamps, Charles Monginot and Paul Friedrich Meyerheim.
