= Zacharie Noterman =

Belgian painter (1820–1890)

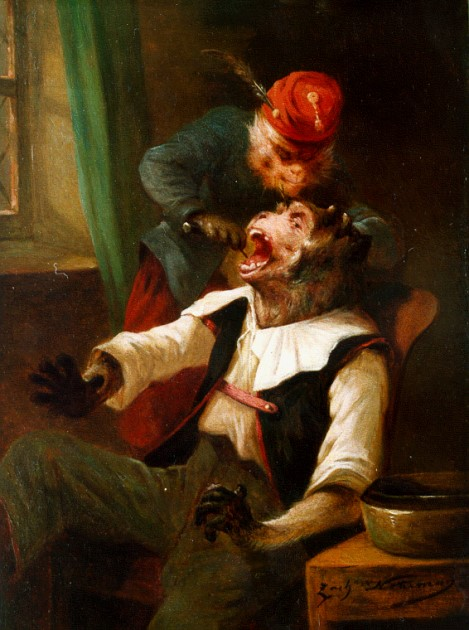
The monkey dentist

Zacharie Noterman or Zacharias Notermann (1820 in Ghent – 1890 in Paris) was a Belgian painter and printmaker who specialized in scenes with monkeys engaging in human activities (the so-called singeries), as well as in paintings of dogs. He also produced some scenes of traveling circuses.

== Life ==
Zacharie Noterman was born in Ghent as the son of a decorative painter. He was initially trained by his older brother Emmanuel Noterman, a genre and animal painter active in Antwerp. Noterman continued his art studies at the Academy of Fine Arts of Antwerp.

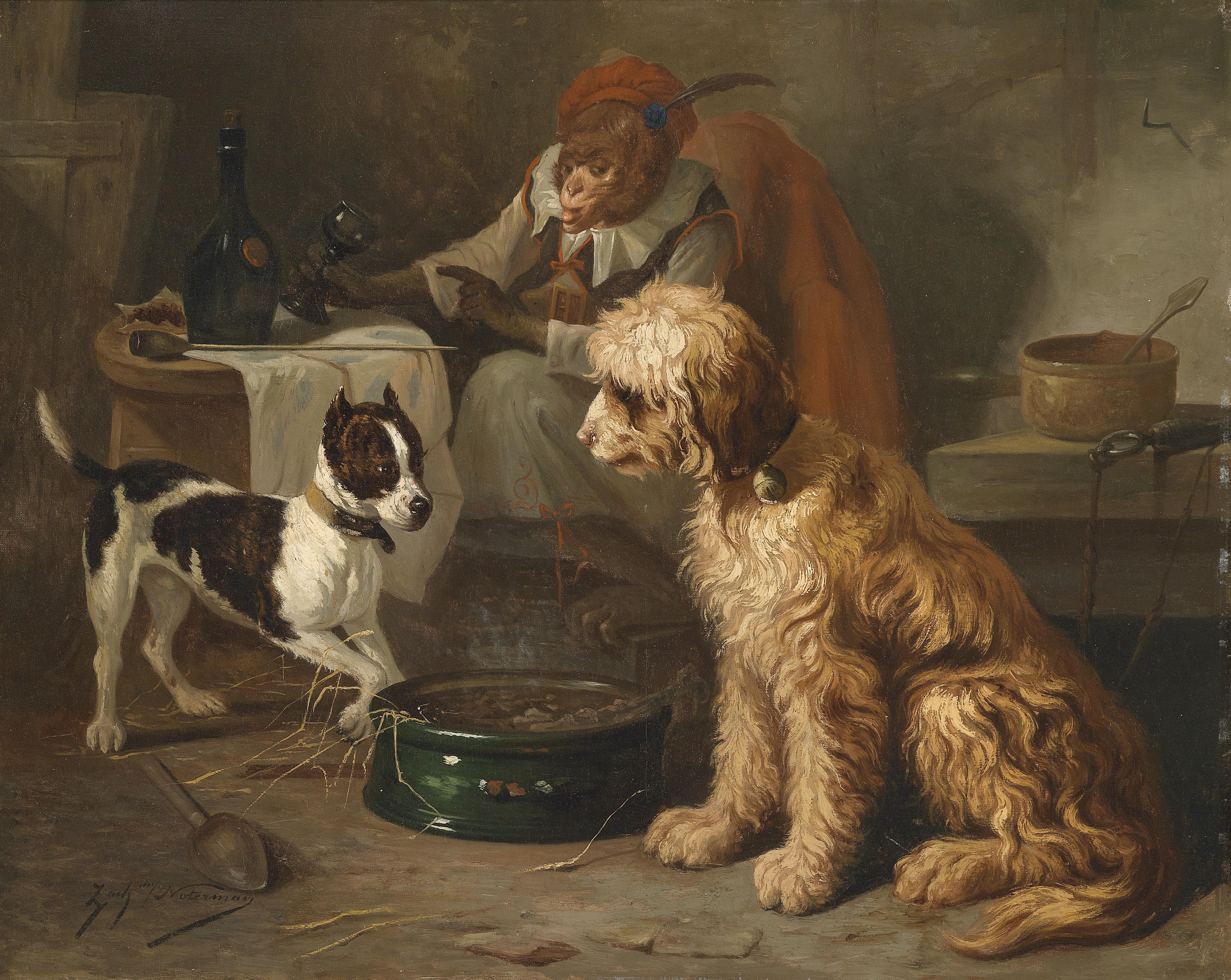
A small meal in the tavern

Zacharie Noterman lived with his brother in Antwerp. Later he moved to Paris where he showed his works at the salon. His final participations in the Paris salon date from the years 1879 and 1880.

== Work ==
Noterman painted mainly scenes with animals including portraits of dogs as well as scenes involving cats and dogs. Noterman was particularly interested in the subject of singeries, which are humoristic paintings and etchings of monkeys engaging in human activities. The monkeys in the scenes are often dressed in costumes which adds comedy to their 'aping' of a specific human action (often a vice such as smoking or gambling) or occupation such as a dentist, lawyer, painter, art critic, etc. Noterman's work shows a growing interest in realism in painting in Belgium.

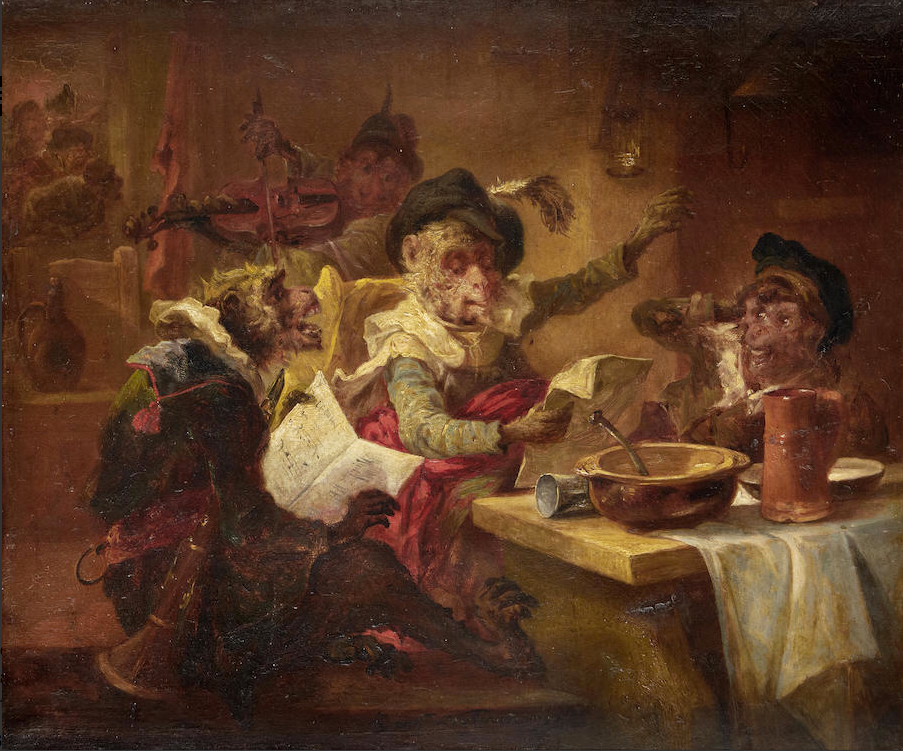
Monkey music

Noterman is the author of several etchings, which deal with a similar subject matter as his paintings. In particular, his singeries were very popular and between 1863 and 1866 he was commissioned by the publisher Cadart in Paris to make three original etchings on the subject.
