= Joseph Lies =

Belgian painter

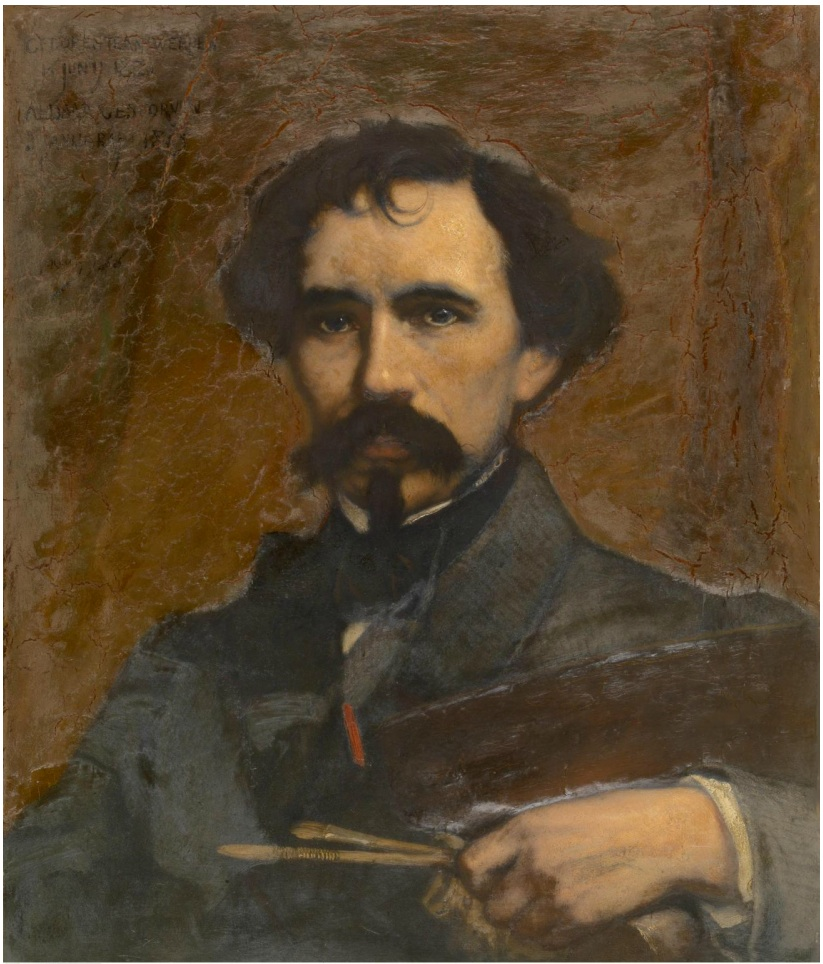
- Portrait of Joseph Lies by Charles Verlat
- Born: Joseph Henri Hubert Lies; 14 June 1821; Belgium
- Died: 3 January 1865 (aged 43)
- Education: Antwerp Academy of Fine Arts
- Occupations: Painter, draughtsman and engraver
- Parent(s): Hendrik and Catharina-Jozefina van Grimberghen

Joseph Lies or Joseph Henri Hubert Lies (Antwerp, 14 June 1821 – Antwerp, 3 January 1865) was a Belgian Romantic painter, draughtsman and engraver. He worked in a wide range of genres including history painting, landscapes, genre scenes and portraits. He enjoyed a European-wide reputation during his lifetime.

== Life ==
Joseph Lies was born in a family of modest means. His father Hendrik worked as a blacksmith at their home in Antwerp. When his father died when Joseph was 13 years old, his mother Catharina-Jozefina van Grimberghen opened a hardware store to secure an income for the family. He did not attend school but studied at home with his brother and learned various foreign languages. From 1834 to 1842 he attended courses at the Antwerp Academy of Fine Arts. His first paintings, mainly history and genre scenes, date from his period. One of his teachers at the academy was Nicaise de Keyser, a key figure in the Belgian Romantic-historical school of painting.

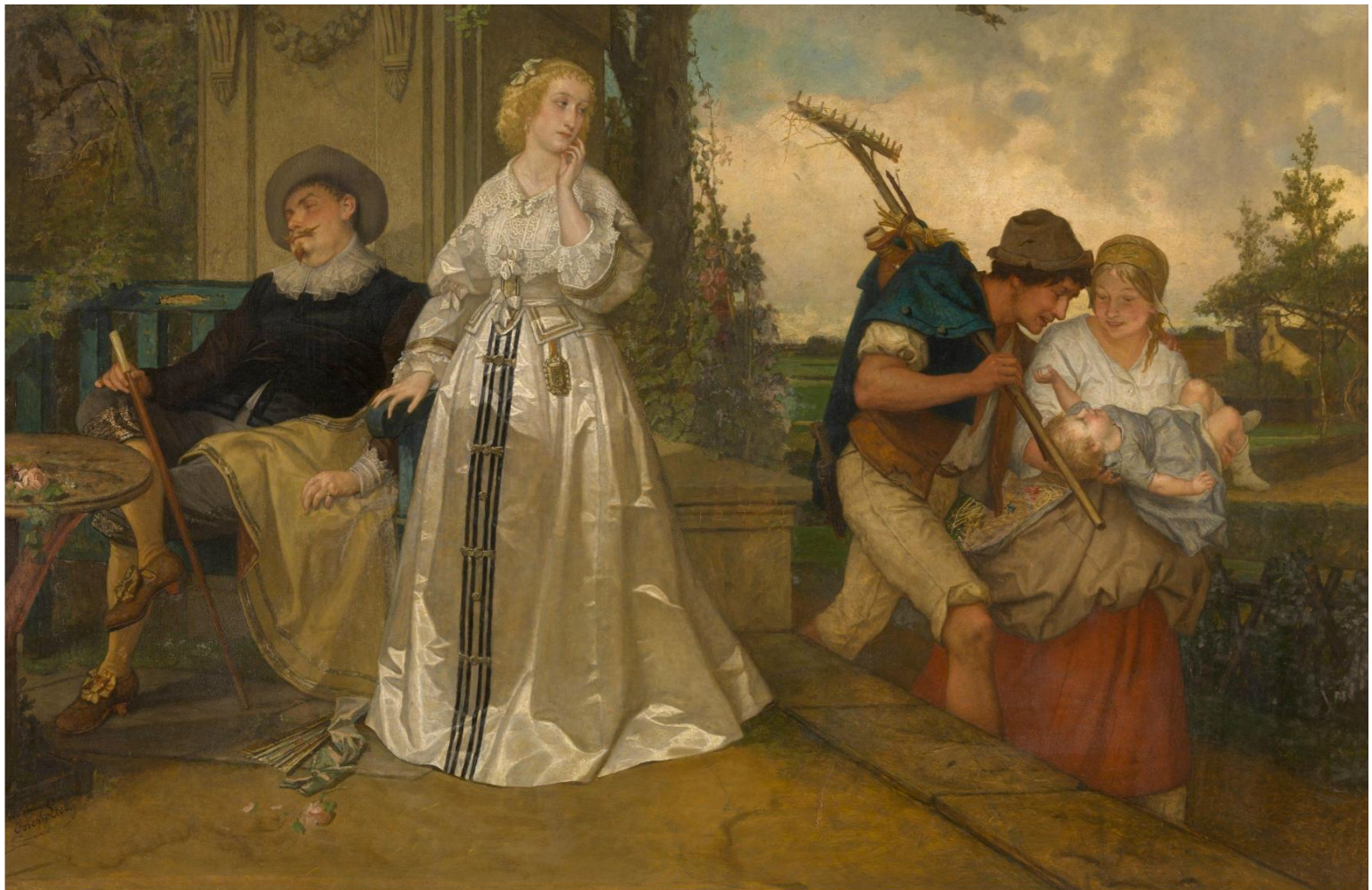
A contrast

At the age of 20 Lies was drafted into the Belgian army. He served in a regiment in Liège where the officer in charge allowed him to devote most of his time to painting and required him to give art classes to the officer's daughter. After completion of his military service and his return to Antwerp in February 1843 Lies picked up his painting career. His most important works were created in the second half of the 1850s. The Antwerp city council commissioned in 1859 his largest painting entitled Baldwin VII, Count of Flanders.

Gradually Lies started receiving official recognition for his work. In 1851 he was awarded the gold medal at the exhibition in Brussels for his Interrogation of Joan of Arc. In 1853 he again obtained the gold medal in Brussels. In 1858 he was made a knight of the Order of Leopold. When in 1849 the Vereniging van Antwerpse kunstenaars (the 'Association of Antwerp artists') was established, he was elected its secretary. Upon the merger in 1852 of this association with the newly formed Kunstverbond or Cercle Artistique, Litéraire et Scientifique d’Anvers ('Art Association'), Lies retained the post of secretary of the department of visual arts, a position he held until 1861. The Kunstverbond championed changes to the organisation of the Antwerp Academy and Lies was the author of a plan that called for the separation of the artistic and administrative functions in the academy.

In 1859 Lies showed the first serious signs of tuberculosis. He complied with his doctor's advice to take a journey to the south and left on 21 October 1859 for Italy. He travelled south through Switzerland, France and Italy. In Italy he visited Florence and Venice where he was evidently influenced by the Italian masters.

He stayed in Italy until June 1860. Upon his return to his hometown he continued to paint and created some of his most successful pieces. He also became a teacher at the Antwerp Academy. He was, however, not fully cured from his illness to which he eventually succumbed on 5 January 1865 in Antwerp. He was in Antwerp one of the first who chose to have a civil (i.e. non-religious) burial as he was a freemason and an atheist. Jaak de Braekeleer chiseled a mausoleum for his friend at the cemetery of Stuivenberg, and this was later transferred to the cemetery of Kiel.

== Work ==
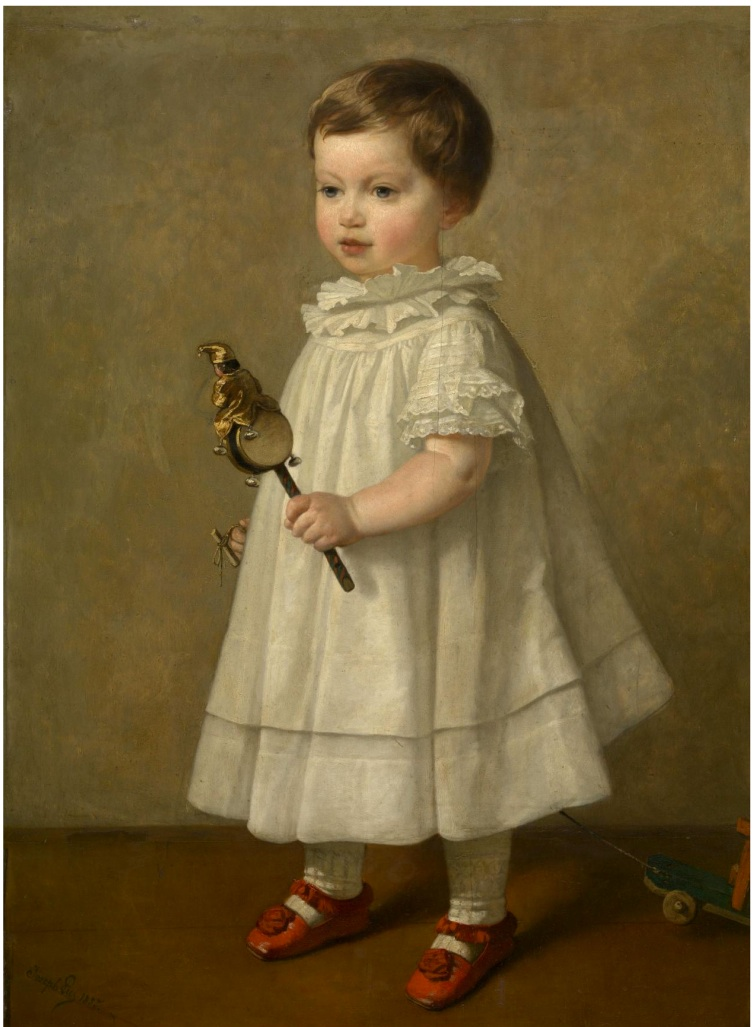
Maria Leys, daughter of Henri Leys

Lies kept a record of all the paintings that he sold. It shows that he sold 120 paintings, although his actual production was likely higher.

The initial work of Lies was influenced by the Romantic movement as represented by Nicaise de Keyser. He later came under the influence of his friend Henri Leys, a leading representative of the historical or Romantic school and a pioneer of the Realist movement in Belgium. Leys had distanced himself from the pathos and historical anecdotes of the Romantic school and the Rubens' influenced style of de Keyser. Instead, Leys had begun painting scenes set in 16th-century Antwerp, combining details studied from life with a deliberately archaising style reminiscent of 15th and 16th-century Flemish and German painting. These innovations by Leys in style and subject matter left a deep mark on Lies' work.

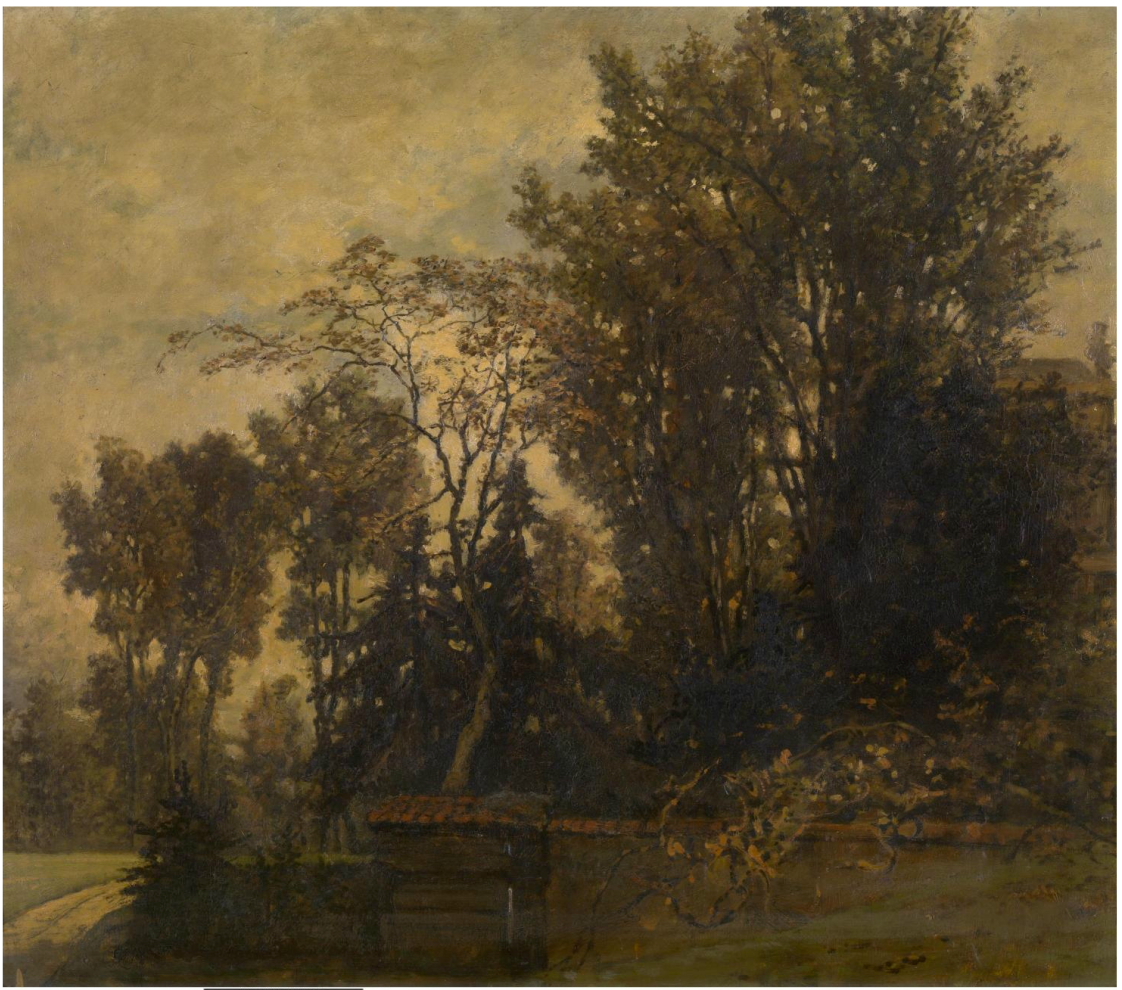
Landscape

In the mid-1840s Lies painted in the various genres and subjects then popular with the public: love scenes, scenes from the lives of famous painters, views of old abodes and rooms with collectors of antique objects. From 1848 to 1849 his works started to focus more on history subjects. His paintings carried titles such as Erasmus writing The Praise of Folly, Albrecht Dürer descends the Rhine, etc. This shift to more serious history subjects may have reflected the influence of Leys but could also have been a reaction to political developments in Belgium. As an atheist and critic of the Catholic Church, Lies was sympathetic to Albrecht Dürer who was a Lutheran and to Erasmus who was critical of the Catholic Church.

Landscape became more important as the principal subject or background of his paintings and took gradually on a more realistic aspect. The landscapes in his compositions made after 1858 show in the distance villages, roads and fields, which bring to mind the later works of Leys. Lies included a view of an entire village in his The enemy approaches (1857, Royal Museum of Fine Arts Antwerp). He excelled in the rendering of the play of colour and light in his views of forests and fields. His landscapes had an influence on the work of Jean Pierre François Lamorinière who was seven years his junior.

Lies was a gifted portrait painter as shown by his two portraits of the wife and daughter of his friend Leys. In particular the portrait of the young daughter of Leys stands out in its simplicity and brings to mind the children's portraits of the 17th-century Flemish artists Cornelis de Vos and Pieter van Lint.
