= Geeraerts =

Geeraerts and variant Geeraert are surnames. Notable people with these surnames include:

== Geeraert ==
- Hendrik Geeraert (1863–1925), Belgian folk hero
- René Geeraert (1908–1999), Belgian middle-distance runner

== Geeraerts ==
- Dirk Geeraerts (born 1955), Belgian linguist
- Jan Geeraerts (1814–1890), Belgian painter
- Jef Geeraerts (1930–2015), Belgian writer
- Marten Jozef Geeraerts (1707–1791), Flemish painter

== Other uses ==
- 13027 Geeraerts, a minor planet named after Jef Geeraerts

== See also ==
- Karel Geraerts (born 1982), Belgian footballer
- Gheeraerts, a surname
