= William Bainbridge Reynolds =

William Bainbridge Reynolds (London, 6 March 1855 – Brighton, 31 March 1935) was a British art metal worker and an architect who was active from 1870 to 1932.

Reynolds was born in the Duke of York's Royal Military School, Chelsea, where his father was a math professor. At the age of sixteen, he was articled to the ecclesiastical architect George Edmund Street, prominent in the Arts and Crafts movement particularly interested in metalwork. He subsequently moved to the office of John Pollard Seddon, who worked in the Gothic revival style. There, he befriended C.F.A. Voysey, whose designs he later implemented. He then worked for a while for the Royal Engineers as a draftsman before joining Gardner's metalworks in his late twenties.

About this time Reynolds met the architect Hugh Roumieu Gough who was subsequently to build the church of St Cuthbert's, Philbeach Gardens where Reynolds contributed to the design of the fittings over many years. Voysey, who wrote Reynolds' obituary for The Times, described him as having 'a profound reverence for ceremonial and symbolism'. His style slowly changed from neo-Gothic to early Art Nouveau. He became active in the Art-Workers' Guild which promoted the arts and crafts ideal of integrated art, life, and work.

His screen and lectern for St Cuthbert's was described by Nikolaus Pevsner as 'much more playful' than most arts and crafts designers.

He set up his own business, eventually creating the Manor House Metal Works, Clapham, describing himself as 'Art Metal Worker and Bronze Founder' in the 1911 census. He became very successful and his metalwork features in many cathedrals and churches. His patrons included almost every important architect of the period.
