= Josephus Laurentius Dyckmans =

Belgian painter

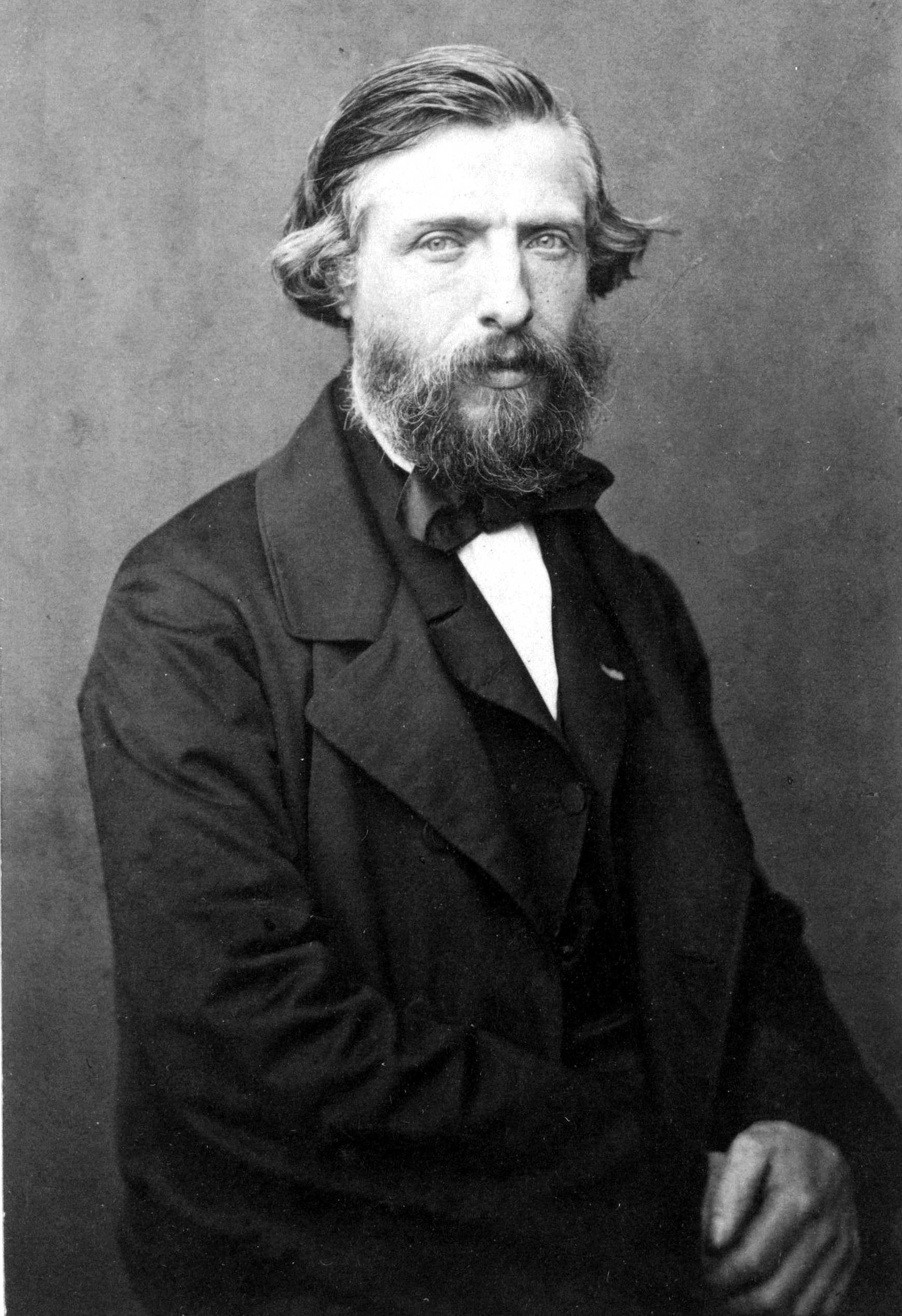
Portrait of Dyckmans, c. 1857-1870

Josephus Laurentius Dyckmans or Jozef Laurent Dyckmans (Lier, 9 August 1811 – Antwerp, 8 January 1888) was a Belgian painter mainly of genre scenes and portraits whose painstakingly detailed pictures earned him the nickname 'The Belgian Gerard Dou'.

== Life ==
Josephus Laurentius Dyckmans was born in Lier where he received his first artistic training from the local painter Melchior Gommar Tieleman. Dyckmans started his career as a decorative painter in his native town. His local patrons recognized his talent and after he had won all the first prizes at the local drawing school, the Lier city government awarded him an allowance that permitted him to continue his studies at the Academy of Fine Arts of Antwerp. He studied at the Antwerp Academy from 1834 to 1835 and worked in the workshop of Gustaaf Wappers, one of the leading Romantic and history painters of Belgium at the time.

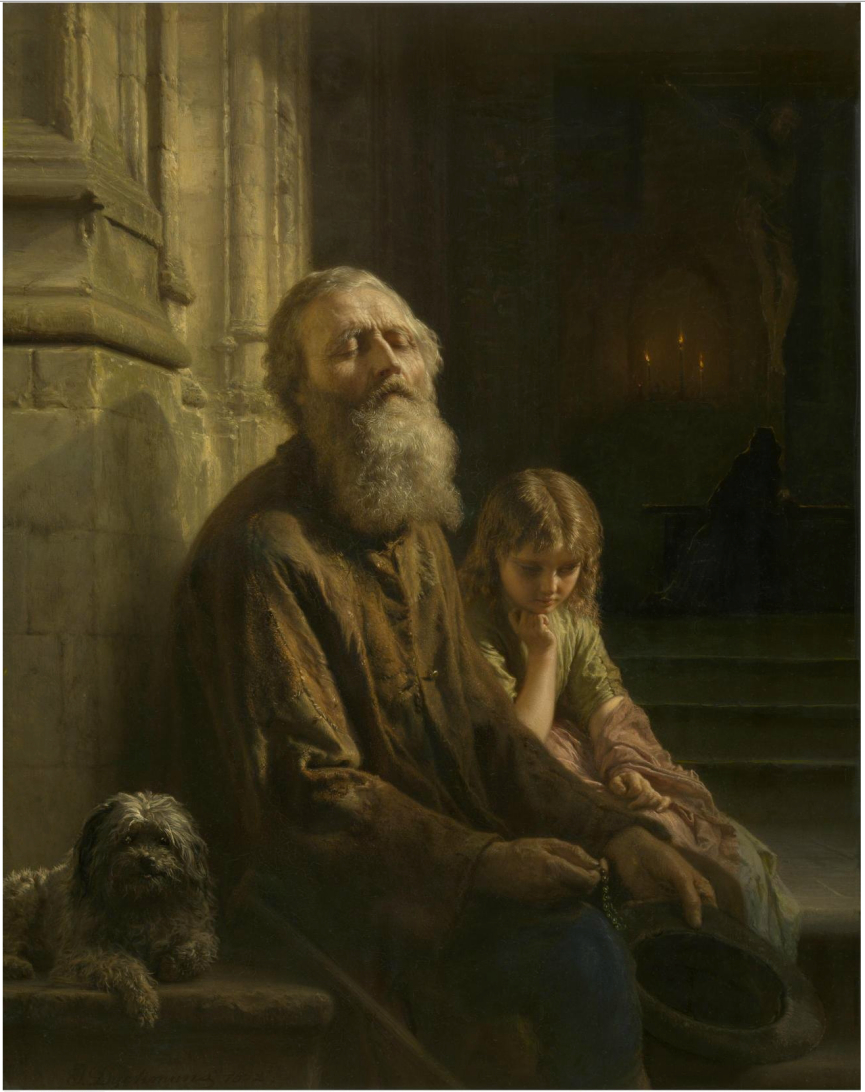
The blind beggar

Dyckmans became a frequent contributor to the local salons (art exhibitions) early in his career. He sent in 1834 his first contribution to the Antwerp Salon where his painting A confession of love was well received. In 1836 his Game of checkers won the silver medal at the Brussels Salon. His 1838 submission of a Vegetable market to the Ghent Salon was a sensation and was subsequently exhibited in Antwerp in 1840 and The Hague in 1841. In The Hague the painting was awarded a silver medal. He exhibited at the Royal Academy of Arts in London in 1846, 1860, 1863 and 1869 and participated in the Universal Exhibition in Paris in 1867.

In 1841, Dyckmans undertook a journey to Paris and the Netherlands. In November of that year he was appointed professor of painting and perspective at the Antwerp Academy. On 8 January 1847 he became a corresponding member of the Belgian Royal Academy. As he was of a timid disposition he did not participate in the meetings of the Belgian Royal Academy and never became an active member. He left his teaching post at the Antwerp Academy in 1854. Dyckmans is reported to have worked in London some time during his career.

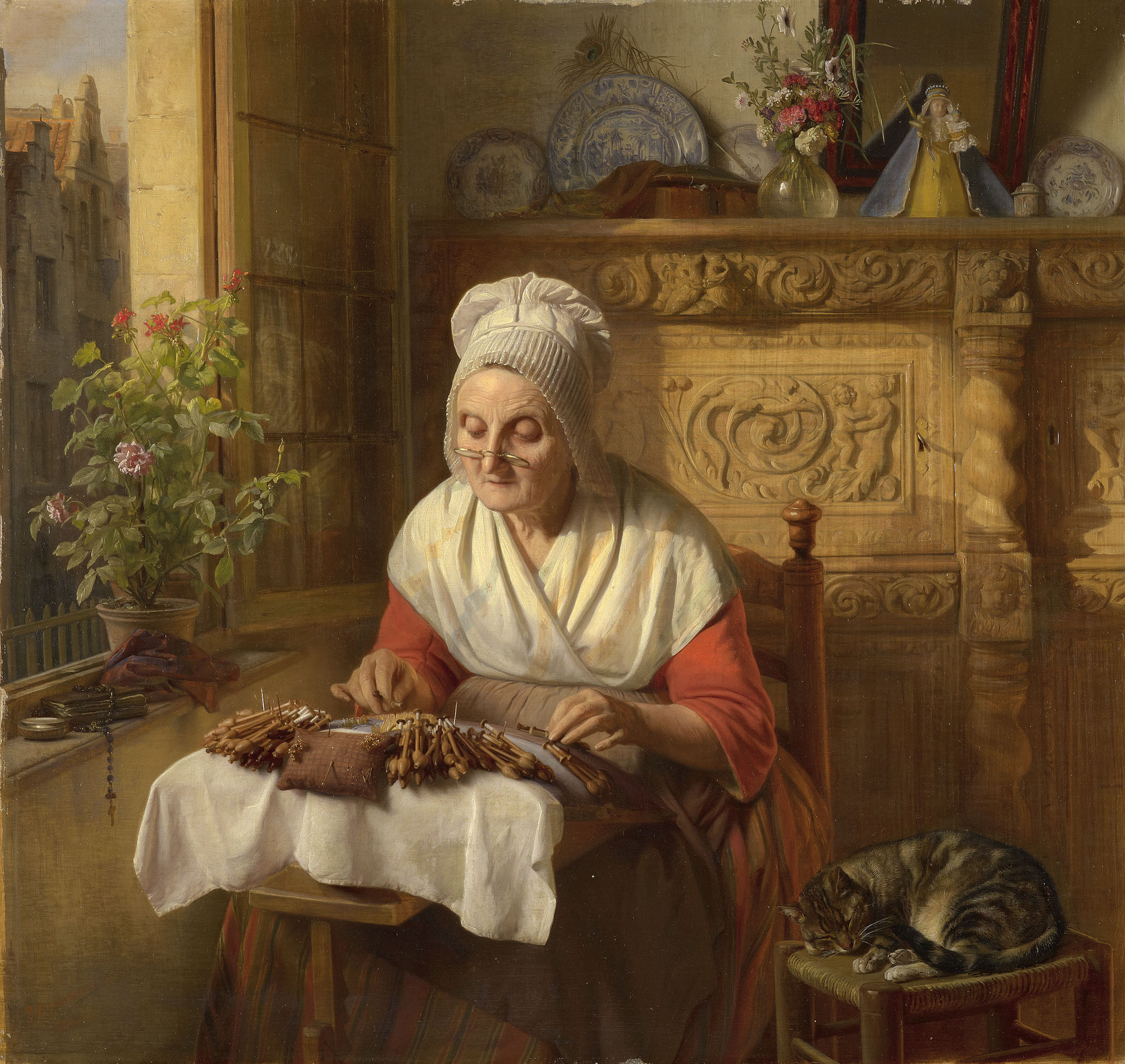
The lace maker

Dyckmans married in 1847 and had two daughters. Despite his international success, Dyckmans lived a relatively secluded life alternating between his spacious house in Antwerp and his small country retreat in Kalmthout, near Antwerp.

Dyckmans received many official awards. The Belgian state made him a knight in the Order of Leopold in 1851 and later in 1870 an officer in the Order of Leopold.

Dyckmans had many students including from Belgium and abroad such as Franz Vinck, Jan Geeraerts, Ernst Stückelberg, Wilhelm Busch, Paul Weber and Emil Hünten.

== Work ==
Dyckmans was principally a genre painter who had a preference for intimate indoor settings. He also painted a few portraits, landscapes, cityscapes and still lifes.

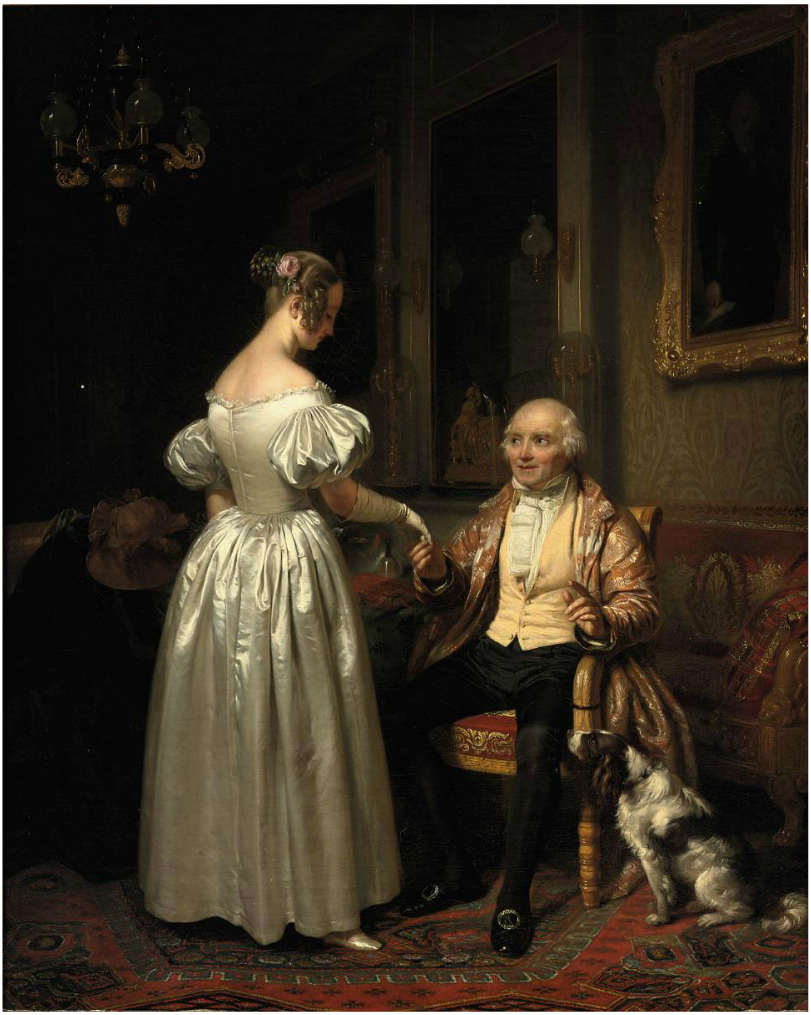
Paternal advice

When Dyckmans entered the art scene, Belgian painting was dominated by the historic-Romantic school exemplified by the grandiose works of Nicaise de Keyser, Edouard De Bièfve and his own master Gustaaf Wappers. The members of this school of painting chose as the subject matter of their work important historical events in Belgium’s history, which were regarded as key to the country’s national identity. The style of these works directly referenced the Flemish Baroque of 17th century Antwerp artists such as Rubens. Unlike these masters, Dyckmans preferred to depict intimate domestic scenes in a refined style that was inspired by the 17th century Dutch 'fijnschilders' ('small masters') such as Gerard Dou and Eglon van der Neer.

Dyckmans painted scenes of poor people as well as of the well-to-do bourgeoisie. The drawing of his figures was slight and his painting was like enamel and porcelain in its smoothness, particularly in his later works. Dyckmans was a master in the refined art of painting which represented each reflection, wrinkle, hair, leaf of a tree etc. He paid painstaking attention to the details of body, clothing and environment. At the same time, he aimed to represent the emotional state of the persons represented.

One of his most successful paintings was The Blind Beggar. He painted the original in 1852 (Royal Museum of Fine Arts Antwerp) and made a reduced copy which is in the National Gallery, London. The painting was extremely popular in the 19th century and was repeatedly copied after it had entered the National Gallery's collection. Dyckmans painted later a variation on the theme of the blind beggar of which he also made a reduced copy (private collections). The figure of the blind beggar in the painting is reportedly a self-portrait of the painter.

Dyckmans painted also portraits and some cityscapes of Antwerp. He further painted a still life of flowers entitled Spring Flowers.
