= Gheeraerts =

Gheeraerts is a surname. Notable people with the surname include:

- Marcus Gheeraerts the Elder (c.1520–c.1590), Flemish painter, draughtsman, print designer, and etcher
- Marcus Gheeraerts the Younger (c.1561/62–1636), Flemish painter, son of Marcus the Elder

== See also ==
- Geeraerts (disambiguation)
