= St Cuthbert's, Earls Court =

Coordinates: 51°29′28″N 00°12′01″W

St Cuthbert's Church, Earls Court
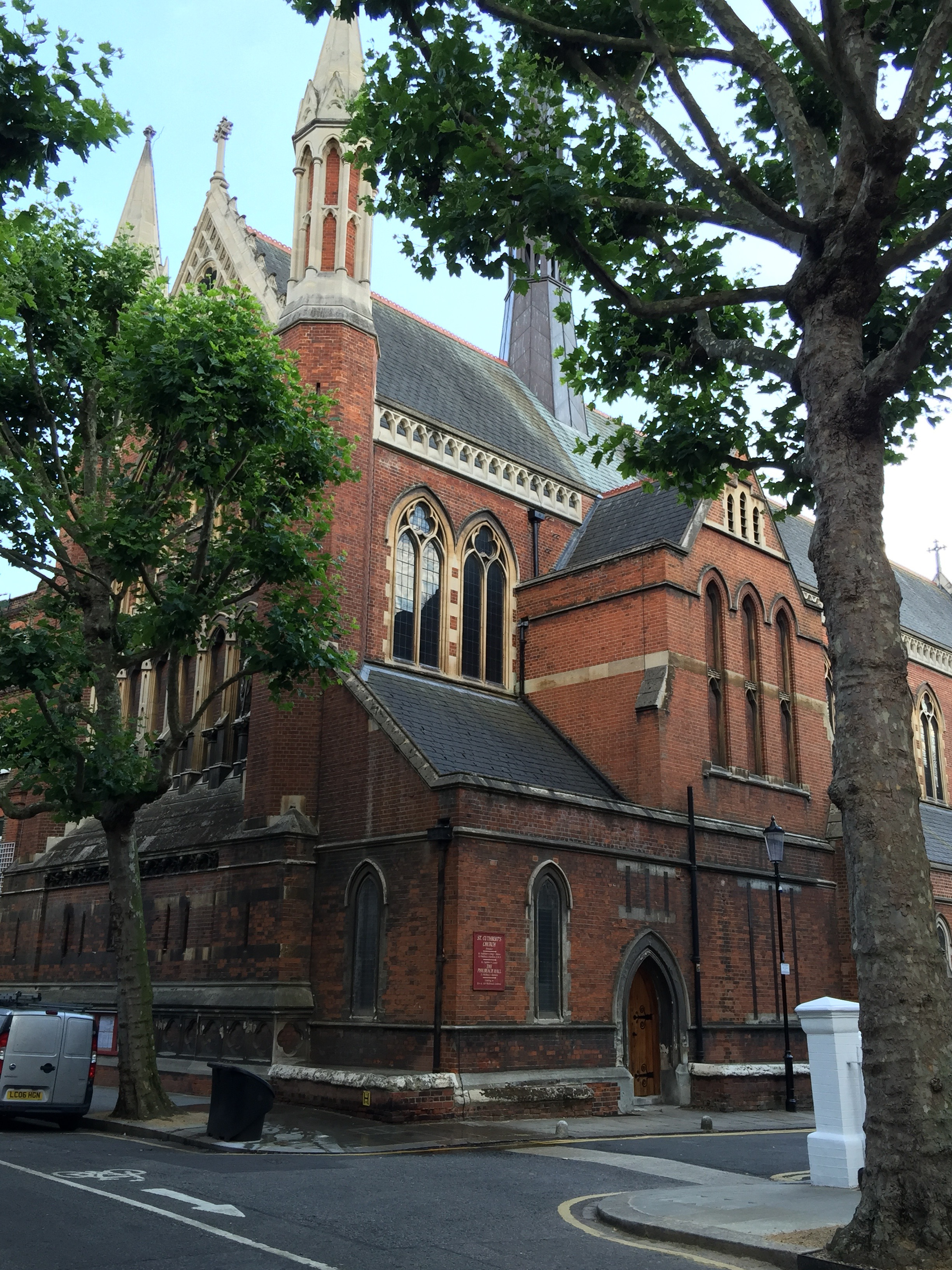
- St Cuthbert's Church, Earls Court
- OS grid reference: TQ 25036 78466
- Location: 50 Philbeach Gardens, Earls Court, London, SW5
- Country: England
- Denomination: Church of England
- Churchmanship: Anglo-Catholic
- Website: www.saintcuthbert.org

History
- Founded: 1883
- Dedicated: 1884

Architecture
- Heritage designation: Grade I
- Architect: Hugh Roumieu Gough
- Style: Gothic Cistercian
- Years built: 1884–87

Administration
- Province: Canterbury
- Diocese: London
- Archdeaconry: Middlesex
- Deanery: Chelsea

Clergy
- Bishop: Rt Revd Jonathan Baker (AEO)
- Priest: Revd Fr Paul Bagott

St Cuthbert's, Philbeach Gardens (Earls Court), is a Grade I listed Anglican church at 50 Philbeach Gardens, Earls Court, London SW5.

The church was built 1884–87, designed by the architect Hugh Roumieu Gough (1843–1904), son of Alexander Dick Gough. The interior furnishings designed by William Bainbridge Reynolds (1845–1935) who was a member of the congregation. It has been hailed as a jewel of the Arts and Crafts movement of the late 19th and early 20th Centuries.

The church is situated on the north west of Philbeach Gardens in Earls Court, near the West Cromwell Road (A4). Adjoining the church is the clergy house, and to that the Philbeach Hall.

St Cuthbert's is noted for its interior decoration and its style of worship.

== History ==
St Cuthbert's is the grandest church to have been built in western Kensington. It was constructed from 1884 to 1887 and was greatly enriched and beautified over the succeeding thirty years. A clergy house attached to the north-west corner of the church was incorporated into Gough's scheme and was the first element to be built. It was undertaken in the latter half of 1883 for a contract price of £1,622 by S. Belham and Company of Buckingham Palace Road, who were to be the builders for the church as well. The church itself followed on from the spring of 1884, slowly at first due to lack of funds. Belhams took up the first contract for £2,937 and the foundation stone, a block quarried at Lindisfarne, was laid by Earl Beauchamp on 2 July 1884. Not long afterwards work had to be stopped while Westall appealed for a further £4,000. Tenders for the second contract were not submitted until May 1886, when Belhams resumed their work for a price of £7,836. In July 1887 the structure was being roofed in. The consecration by Bishop Temple finally took place on 18 November 1887 but the Lady Chapel was apparently not finished until the following year. As completed, the church seated about 950; the cost of its construction was estimated roundly at £11,000.

Under Westall, St Cuthbert's grew rapidly in influence, until it was soon the most flourishing High-Church foundation in Kensington. On Good Friday, 15 April 1898, John Kensit a well known agitator, with some of his followers attended the service, and waiting until his turn came to kneel down and kiss the cross. Instead, he 'seized the crucifix, and, holding it aloft, said in a clear and distinct voice, "I denounce this idolatry in the Church of England; may God help me".' A scrummage ensued, and Kensit and his supporters were with difficulty ejected from the church, Kensit was charged, convicted and fined £3 (about £350 today), but acquitted on appeal at the Clerkenwell Quarter Sessions, though without costs. The incident did St Cuthbert's no harm, and Westall's calm deportment throughout the proceedings enhanced his reputation. Kensit was depicted on the misericord in the vicar's stall in the Sanctuary with protruding asses' ears.

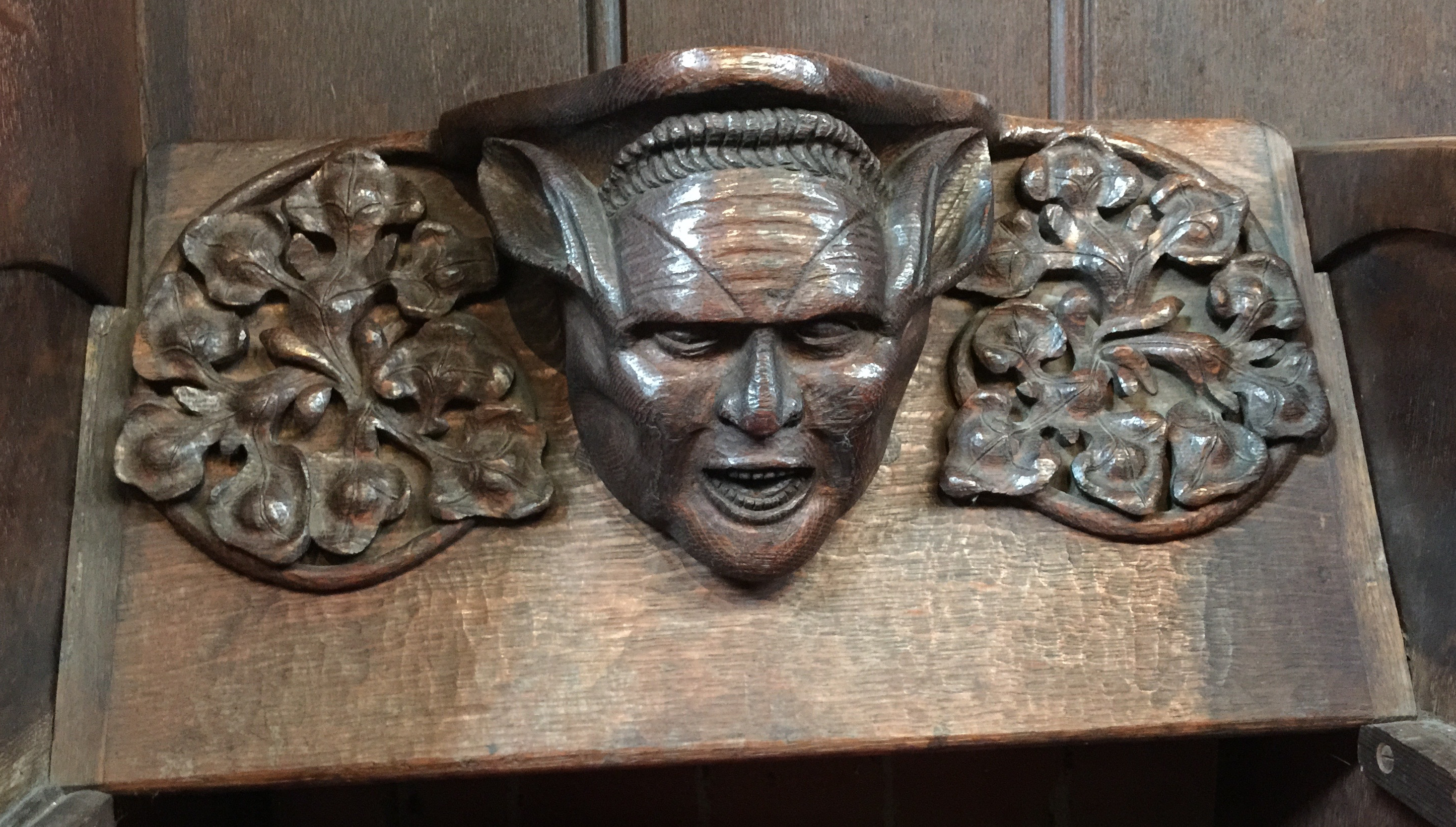
Kensit misericord

Of later building works at St Cuthbert's, the most considerable was the Philbeach Hall, erected north of the clergy house to Gough's designs in 1894–96. This building (No. 51 Philbeach Gardens) housed a library, a hall, a gymnasium and six sets of bachelor chambers for curates. Extra land was leased for this purpose from Lord Kensington, and the total cost of the project came to some £6,570 The northern end of the building was largely destroyed by a bomb in 1940 during the Second World War and more simply rebuilt in 1956–57 to designs by J. Harold Gibbons working in partnership with D. R. Humphrys and R. W. Hurst. Another project, prepared in 1908 by J. Harold Gibbons, would have added a mortuary chapel and cloister on the south side of the church. For this purpose the lease of the adjacent garden was acquired, but Lord Iveagh (from 1902 the freeholder of Philbeach Gardens) objected and the idea was dropped.

There was further damage to the church in the Second World War, on 2 August 1944, by the blast of a V-1 flying bomb opposite the East end of the church which killed three people and caused 77–83 Philbeach Gardens to be demolished and rebuilt. In 1946–8 the church was deprived of its damaged western bellcote and entirely re-roofed in copper under the supervision of J. Harold Gibbons.

The funeral service of Charles Tilston Bright took place at St Cuthbert's in 1888.

== Architecture ==
Gough designed an austere, lofty structure of Transitional style and Cistercian type, with proportions modelled upon Tintern Abbey. It was unified by a single main roof and lit from a tall clerestory running the whole length of the church. There are lean-to aisles uninterrupted except in the south-east corner, where an apsidal Lady Chapel was built. Below the church was a crypt for vestries, a public meeting-room, and a mortuary chapel, it had been intended to use this crypt as a temporary church, but the Bishop had vetoed the suggestion on the grounds that people would not 'go into the ground to say their prayers'. No tower was intended, its function being supplied by a slender flèche upon the roof, a double bellcote above the western gable was planned, and twin finials at the east end.

The most unusual feature of Gough's design was a great blank arch in the east wall, furnished externally with niches for statues instead of window lights. At first the interior walling was finished off in plain brick, in anticipation of decorative glories to come. Some rich fittings had been installed by the date of consecration, notably the Caen stone pulpit, designed apparently by Gough and carved by Baron Felix de Sziemanowicz of Kennington (placed in continental fashion almost halfway down the nave, as though to distance it from the altar), some carving outside the Lady Chapel and the sedilia and piscina on the south of the Sanctuary (1888).The sounding board designed by J. Harold Gibbons and made by Pearson, Brown and Company of Manchester was added in 1907. The seven sacrament font in its baptistery all designed by Gough and carved by Sziemanowicz with panels 'after Müller's pictures at Düsseldorf', (1888), the walls were still plain brick. Lighting was by means of metal gas fittings (1887) looking rather like open thimbles, which have sadly long since vanished. They were provided by the firm of J. Starkie Gardner, for whom they had been designed by William Bainbridge Reynolds.

== Interior decoration ==
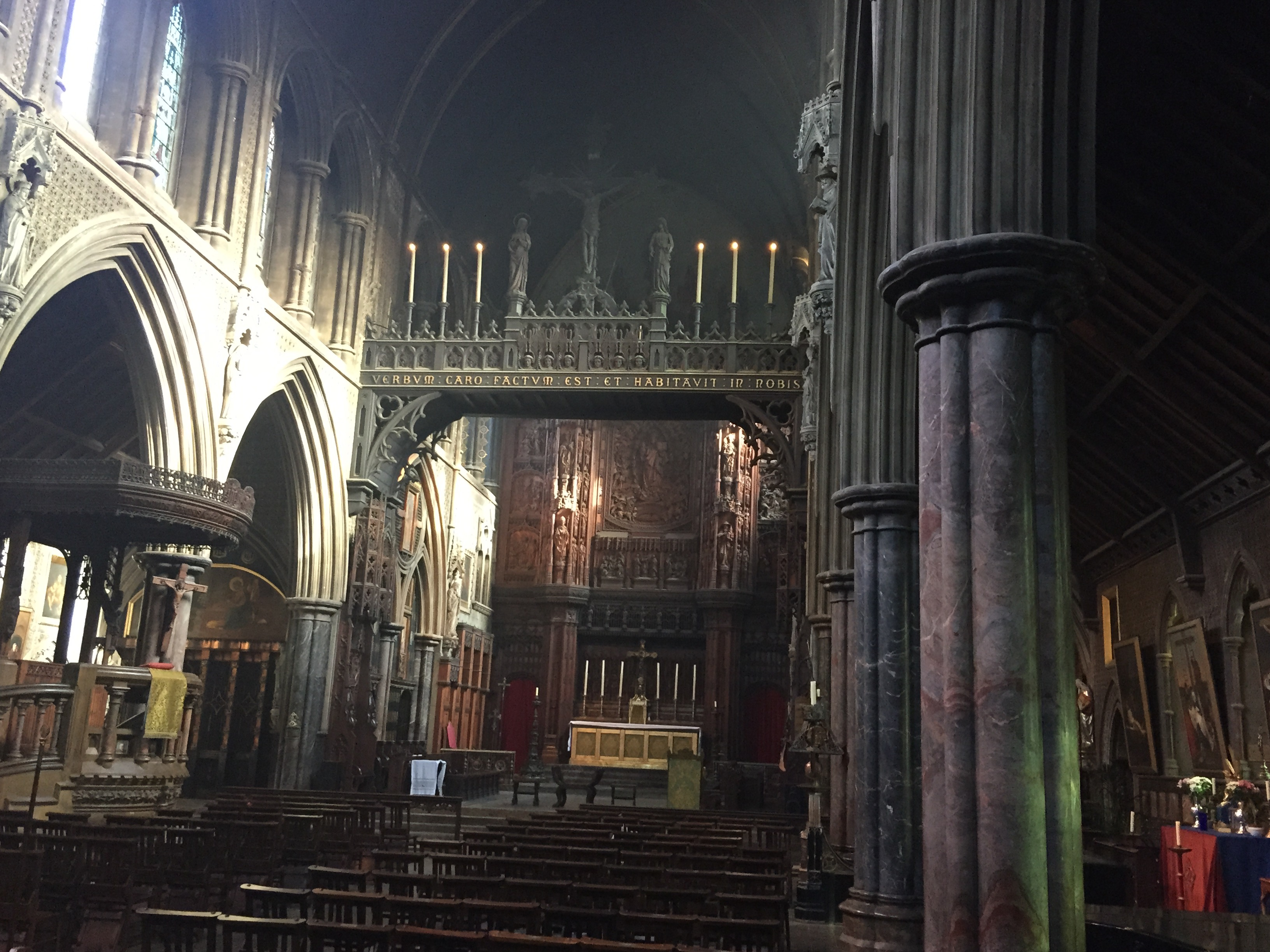
Interior of the church and Rood Screen

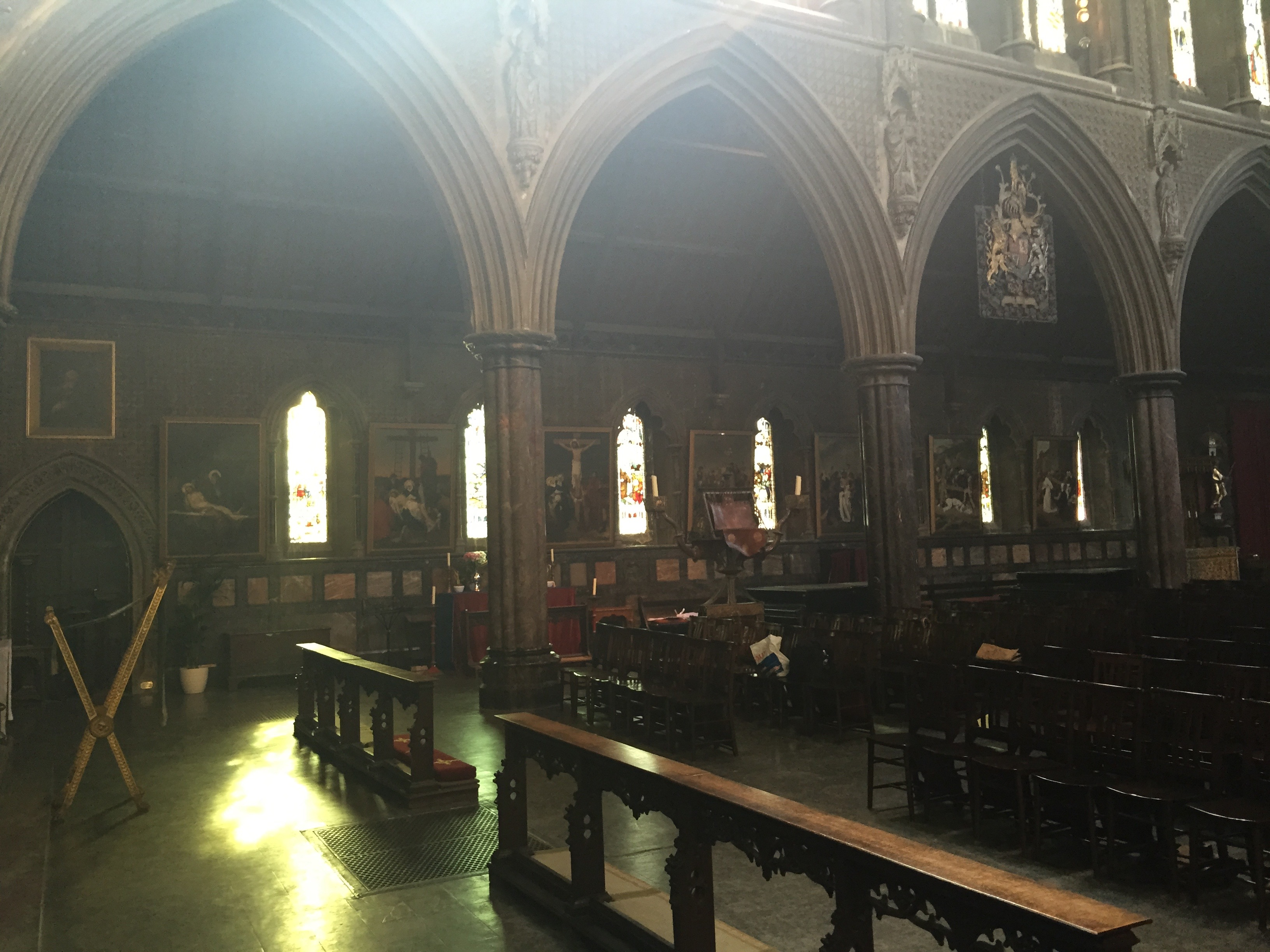
south wall stations of the cross and lectern

Associated with the vigour of St Cuthbert's was a policy of beautification, which proceeded without a pause from 1887 until 1914 and turned an impressive but unoriginal building into a monument to turn-of-the- century Anglo-Catholic taste. Several architects and many craftsmen, professional and amateur, were involved in the process. The more elaborate jobs were entrusted to skilled professionals such as Bainbridge Reynolds, the clergyman-designer Ernest Geldart and the architect J. Harold Gibbons. In addition the church's supporters organized themselves into 'guilds' which took on manifold decorative tasks in the Arts-and-Crafts spirit. Classes and workshops under professional guidance were arranged in stone- and woodcarving, metal-working and church embroidery, and the guilds then proceeded to their long labours. For example, the carved stone diapering of varying pattern gradually extended round the walls between 1890 and 1909 was the responsibility of the Guild of St Peter, the chancel stalls were made by the Guild of St Joseph, and the vestments by the Guild of St Margaret.

=== Rood ===
H. R. Gough contributed little to the church after 1888, but he did design the rood screen made by Jones and Willis, (1893), with the figure of Christ after that in Capilla Real, Granada Cathedral. The Rood loft has an altar on the south side with a Tabernacle where the Blessed Sacrament was reserved as the Bishop of London, John Jackson, objected to the Sacrament being reserved in the Lady Chapel, so to strictly comply with the bishop's instruction The Sacrament was reserved in the Rood Screen altar Tabernacle. On the Feast of the Translation of the Relics of St Cuthbert on 4 September 2015 the three Relics held by the parish were moved to the altar to a permanent reliquary. The Latin inscription is from the first chapter of St John's Gospel – Verbum caro factum est et habitavit in nobis – The Word was made flesh and dwelt among us.

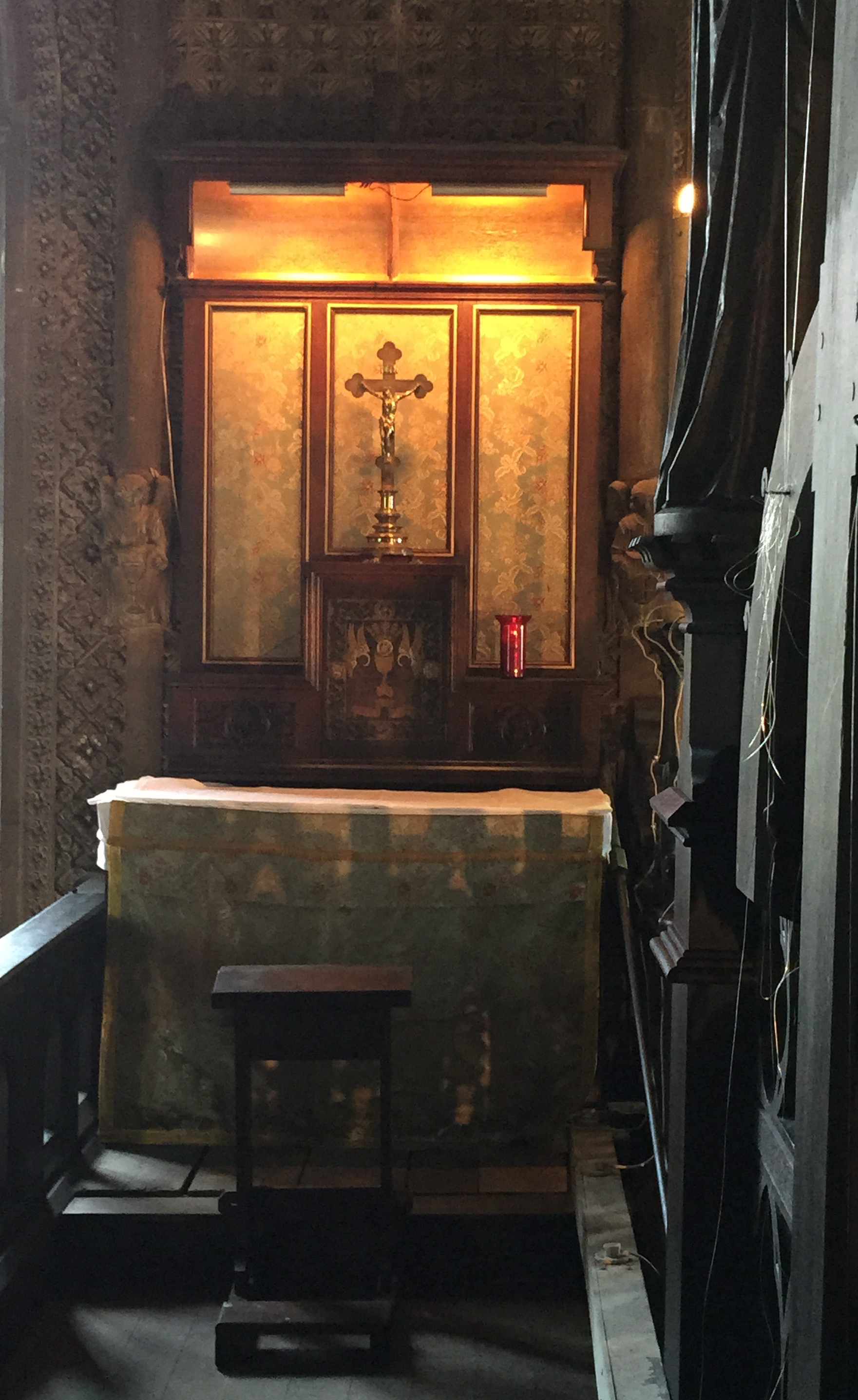
Rood Screen Altar

=== Reredos ===
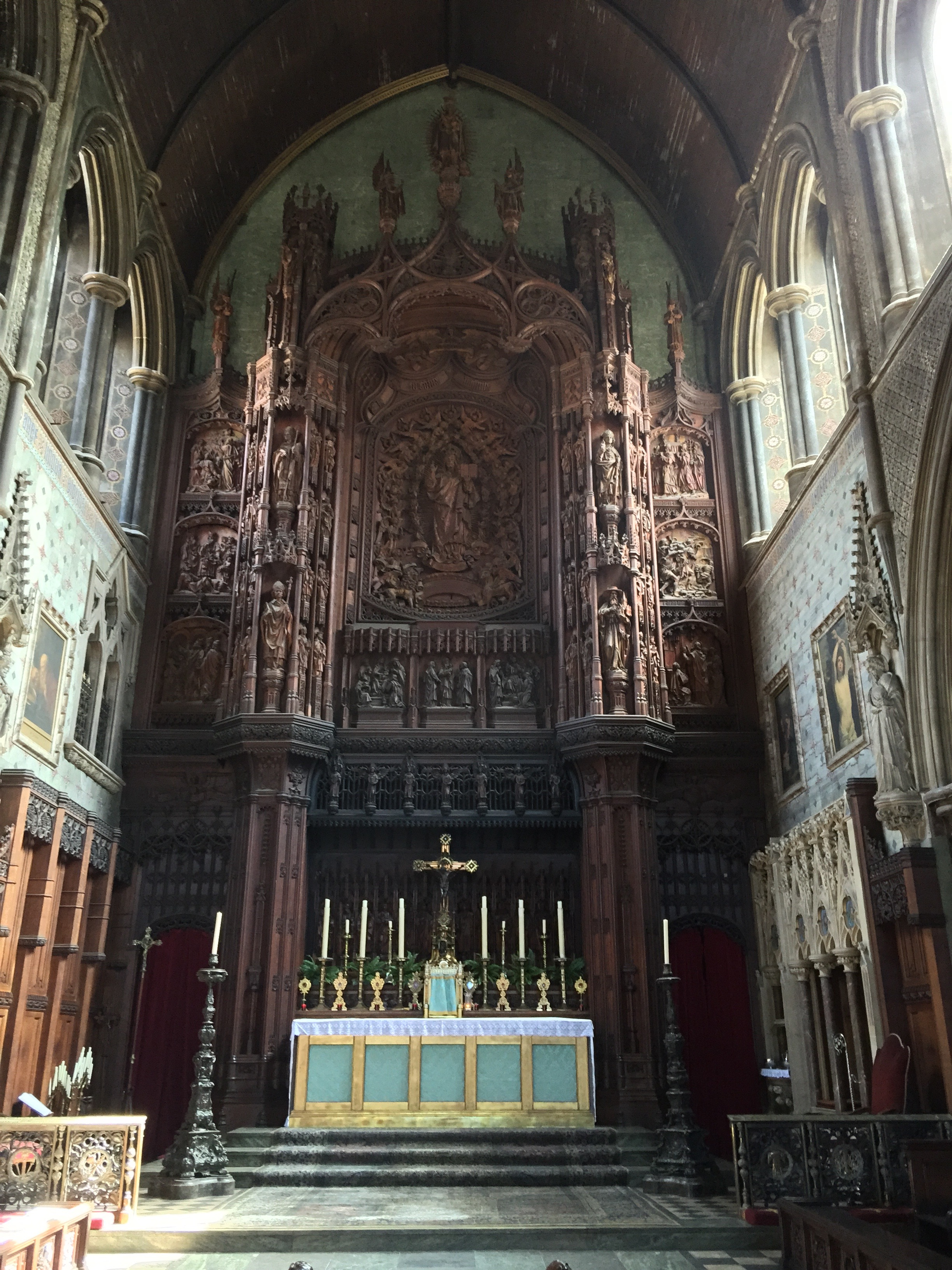
High Altar and Reredos

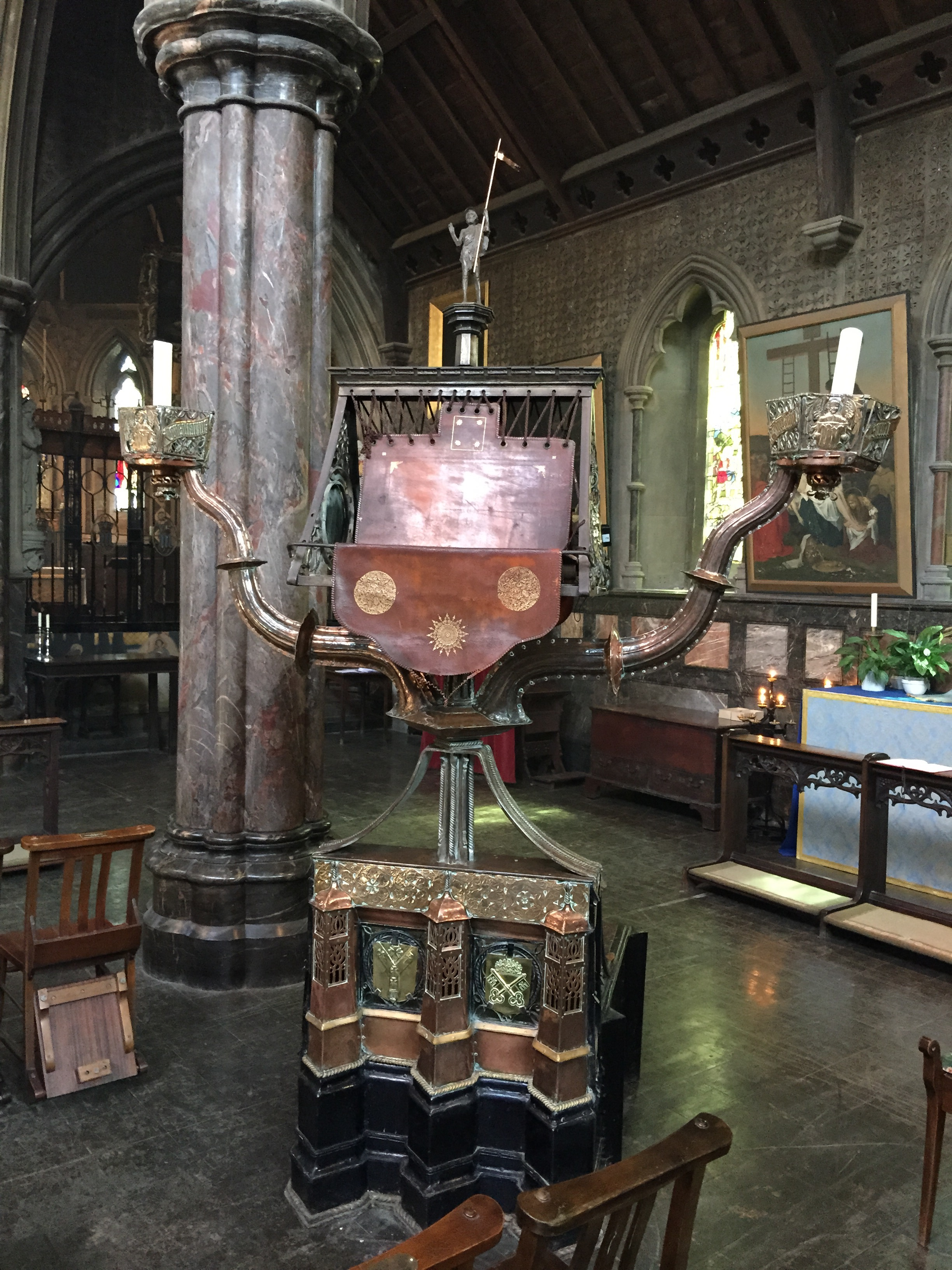
The Lectern

The great reredos filling the whole eastern wall, was entrusted to the Reverend Ernest Geldart apparently at his own request. The subject is The Worship of the Incarnate Son of God with Incense and Lights, his overwhelming Hispanic design was made in 1899–1900 but had to wait until 1913–14 for funds sufficient for its execution. During cleaning in the early 2000s glass was found embedded in it, presumably from the V1 blast in 1944.

=== Bainbridge Reynolds ===
Reynolds contributed a fantastic amount of glories to St Cuthbert's:

- Screens between north aisle and organ chamber, south aisle and Lady Chapel, and on north and south sides of chancel, c. 1895–1904 *The Clock on west wall, (1898).
- Lady Chapel Altar rail.
- Royal arms (hanging in south arcade), (1904) as a parish memorial to Queen Victoria.
- Paschal candlestick, (1905)
- High Altar with silver-panelled front, (1910) which replaced the front of 1890 designed by G. Somers Clarke junior and painted by Reynolds.
- Tabernacle designed by J. Harold Gibbons and made by Reynolds, (1933).
- The most obvious and striking is the lectern which Sir John Betjeman described as 'Nouveau Viking'.

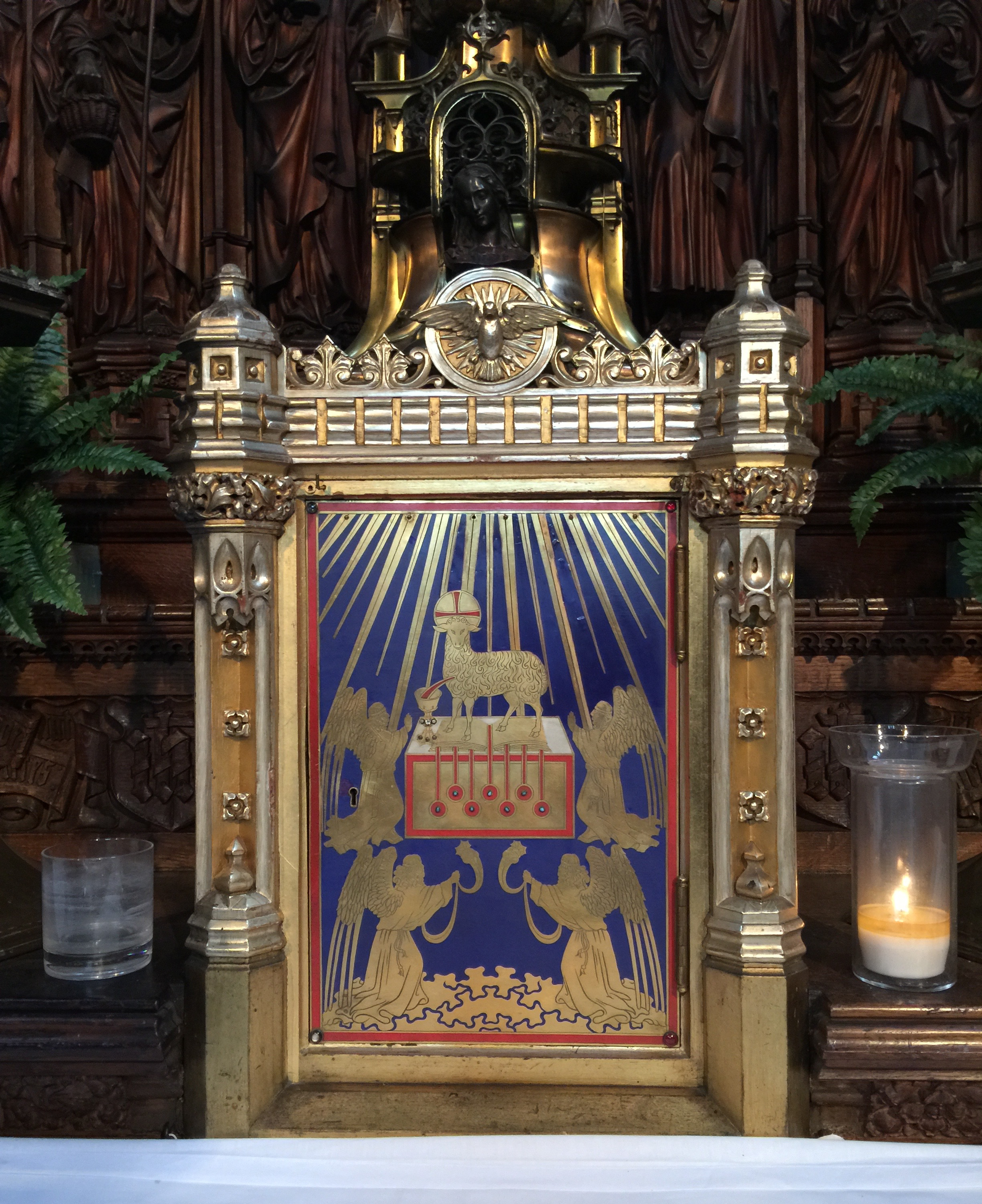
High altar Tabernacle

=== Stations of the Cross ===
Were painted by Franz Vinck of Antwerp, (1888)

=== Statuary ===
The statues over piers are by Gilbert Boulton of Cheltenham. The statue of St Gregory in niche on east wall by Gilbert Boulton, (1908)

=== Stained glass ===
The Lady Chapel and baptistery had stained glass windows by Charles Eamer Kempe, the Clerestory and aisle windows mainly designed by Charles Edward Tute, (1890). The Lady Chapel windows were blown out in 1944. The lost glass was replaced with new stained glass by Hugh Ray Easton in 1947–60. Many in the clerestory were also destroyed

=== Calvary ===
Stands outside east end designed by J. Harold Gibbons and made by Guglielmo Tosi (1919) as a memorial to those lost in the First World War.

=== Organ ===
Gough added an organ chamber breaking the line of the north aisle roof to house an instrument which extends from crypt level to above the clerestory and is larger and noisier than is strictly necessary by Dove Brothers in 1896–7. The Organ itself was made by Robert Hunter of Clapham, 1899–1900

Embellishments to the interior of St Cuthbert's continued until 1914, but few changes were made after the First World War. Westall died in office in 1924 but his traditions were continued by his successors as the church garden and borders are maintained by a small group of parishioners.

== Gallery ==
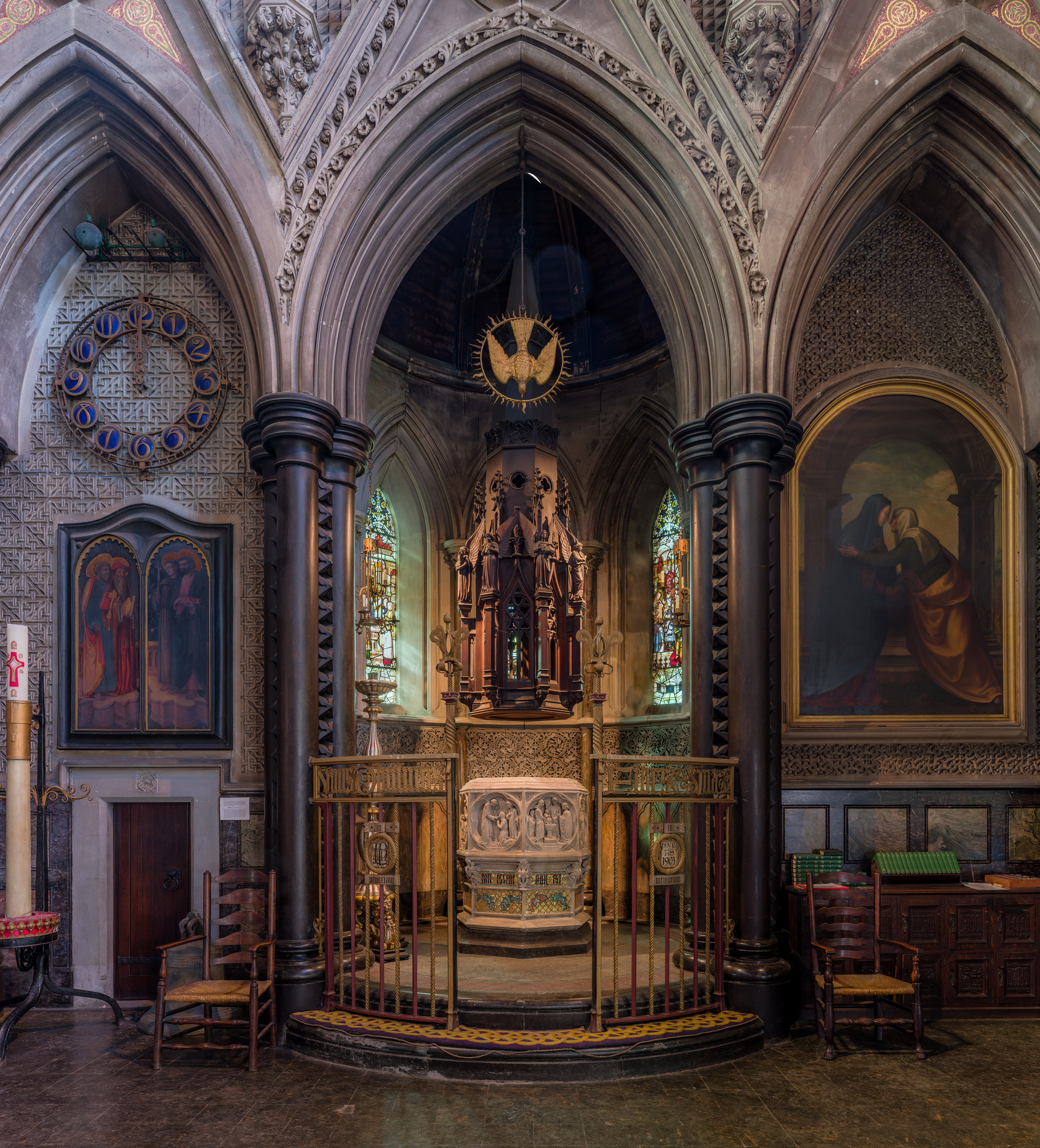
The Baptistery

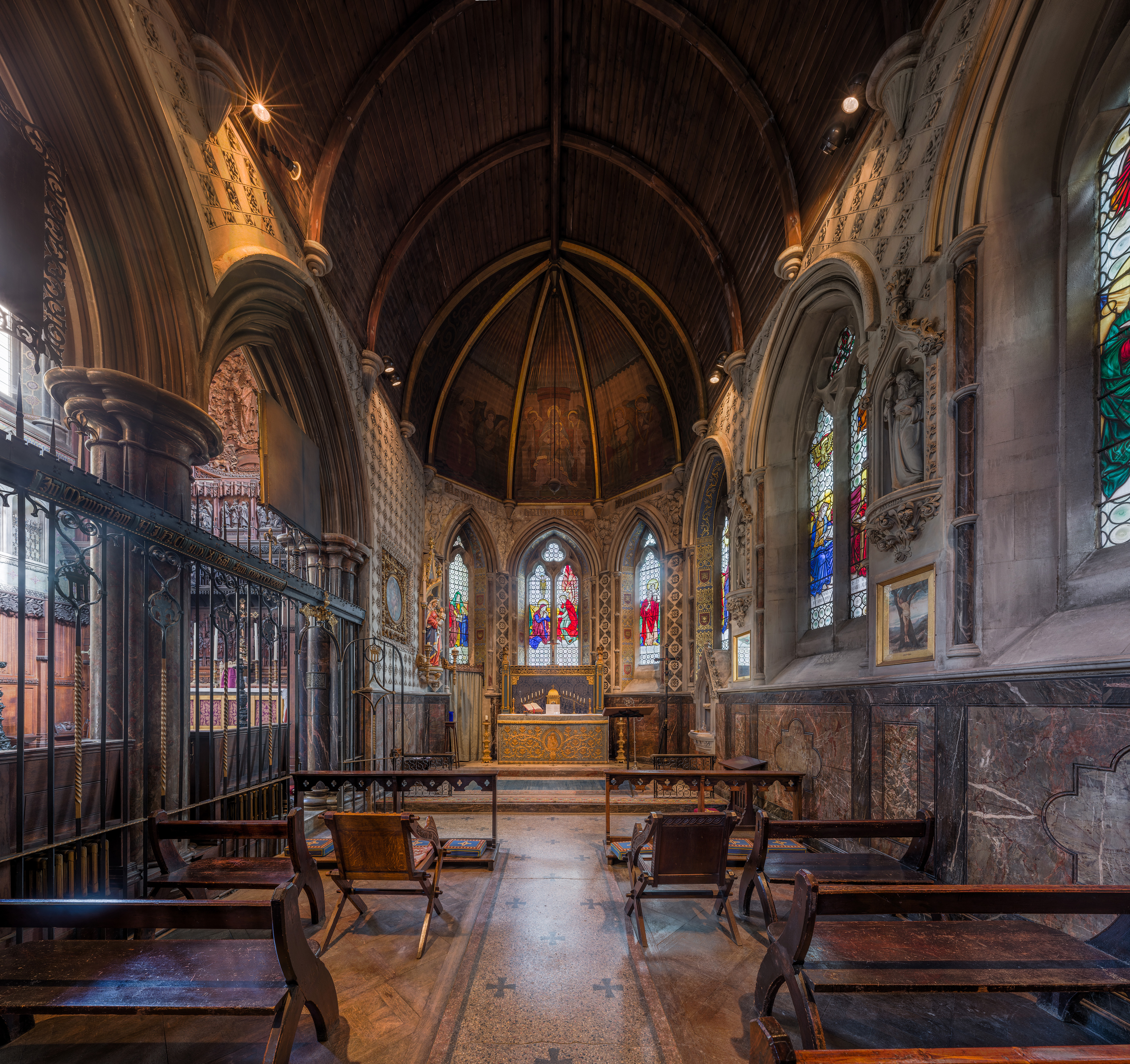
Lady Chapel

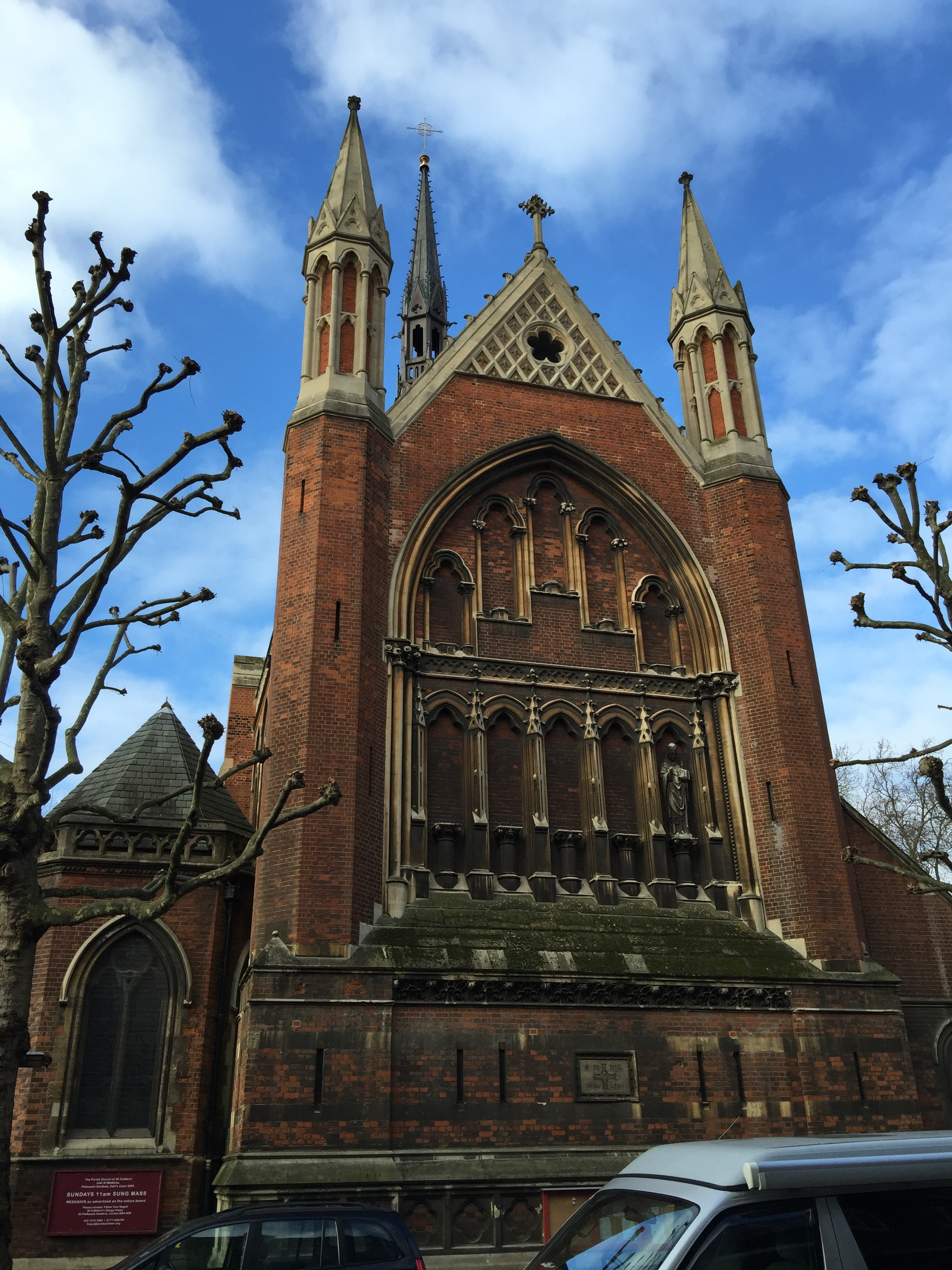
East wall exterior

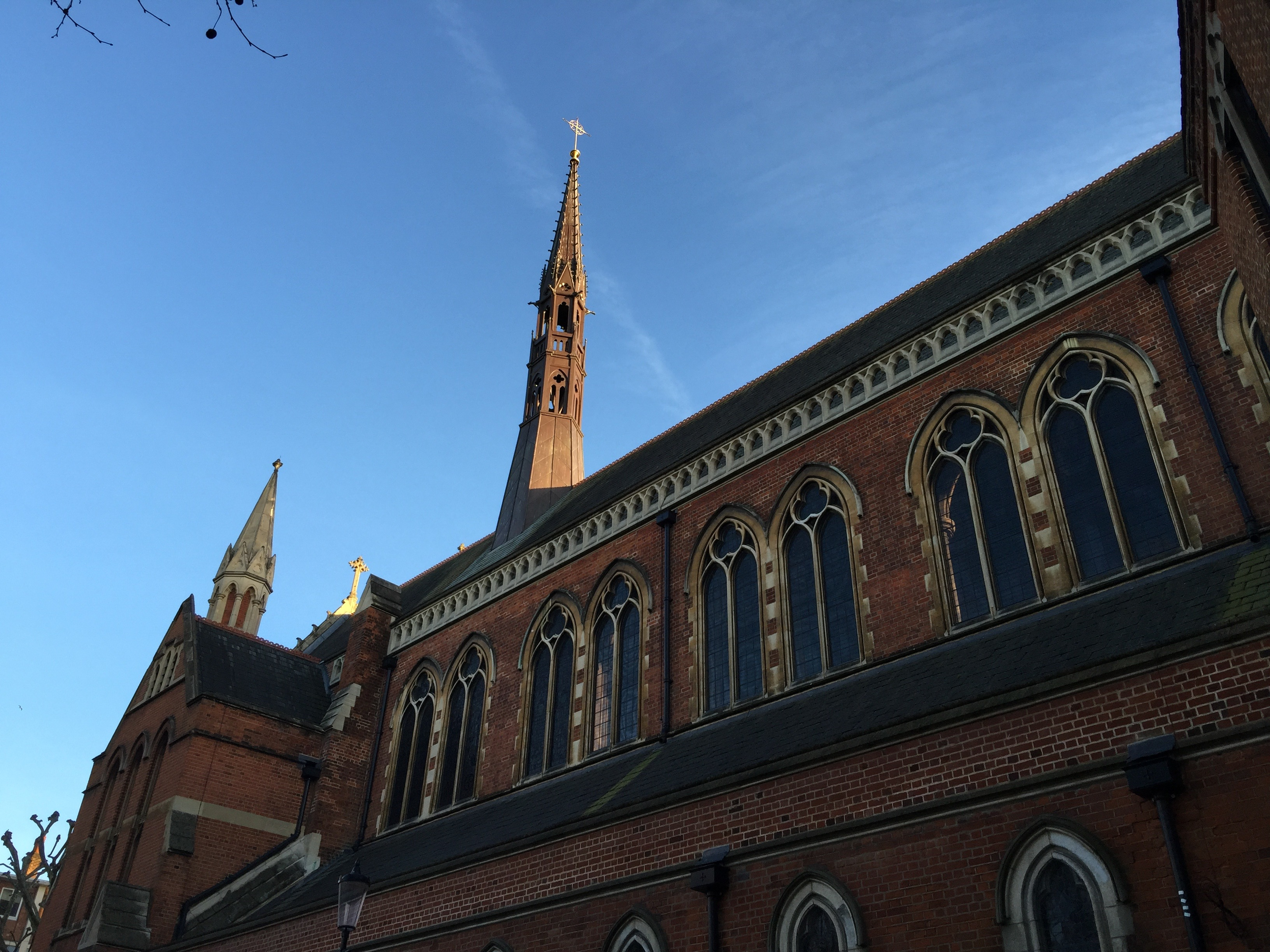
North exterior and flèche

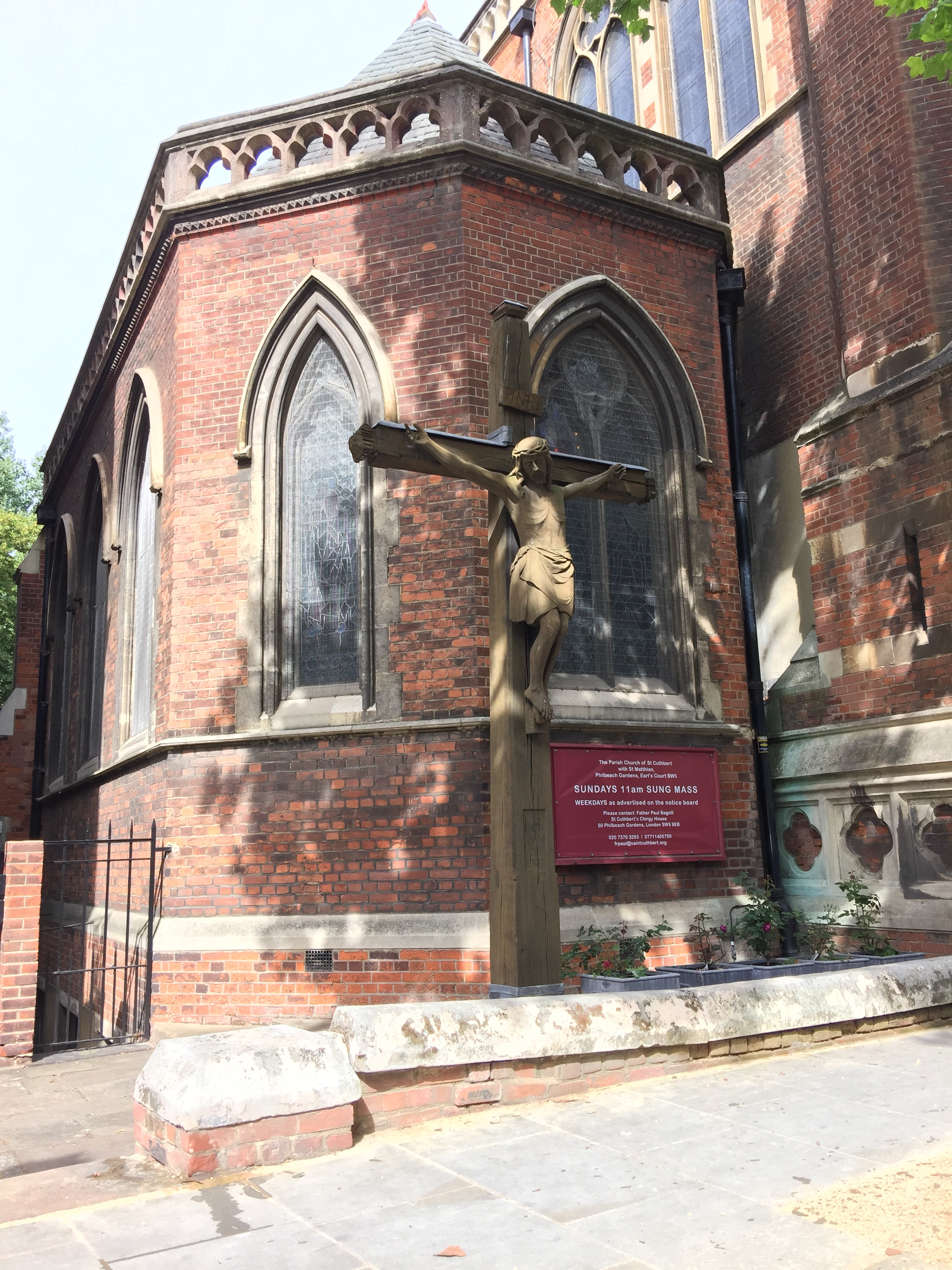
Calvary outside Lady Chapel

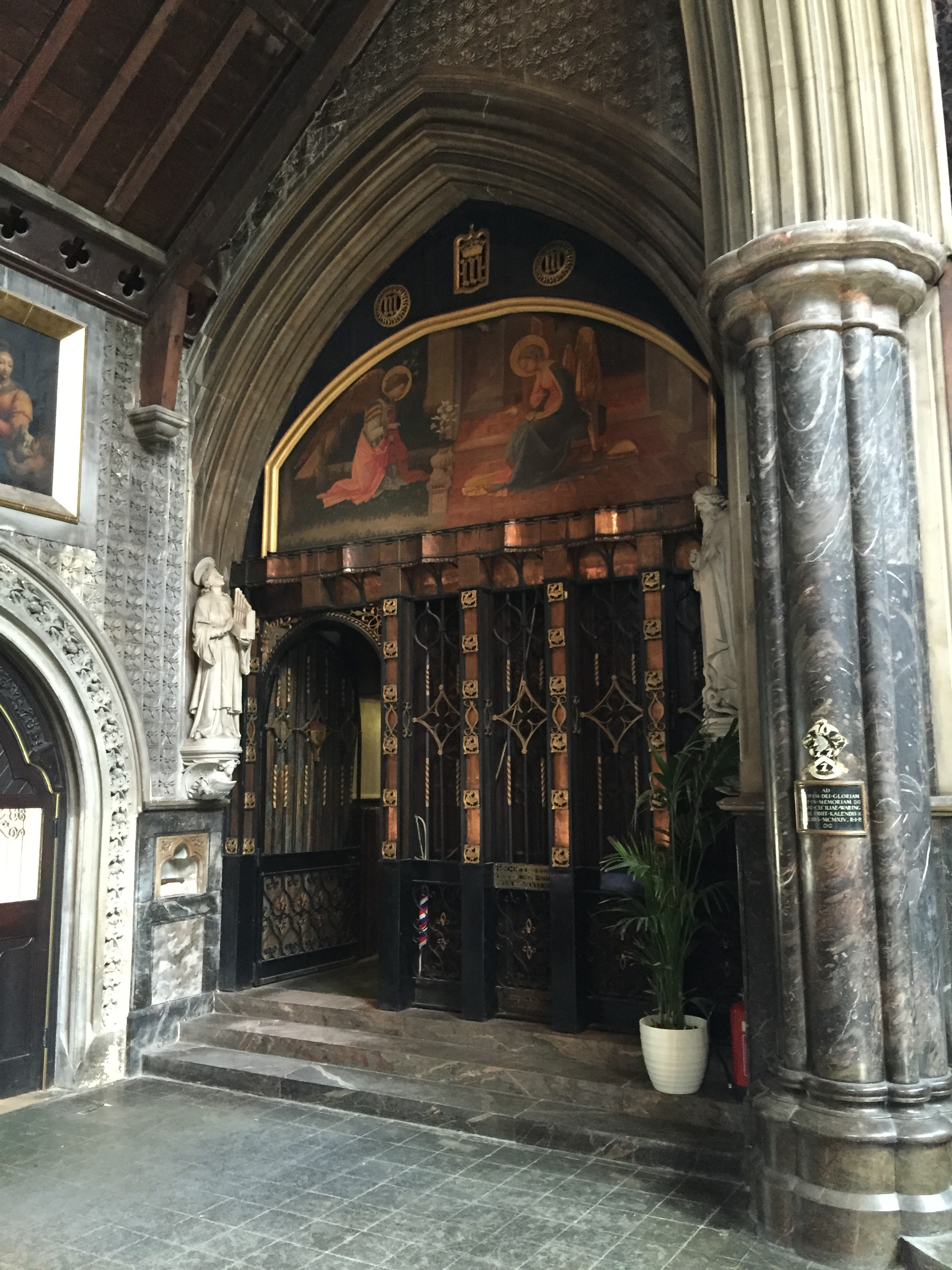
The Teal Screen

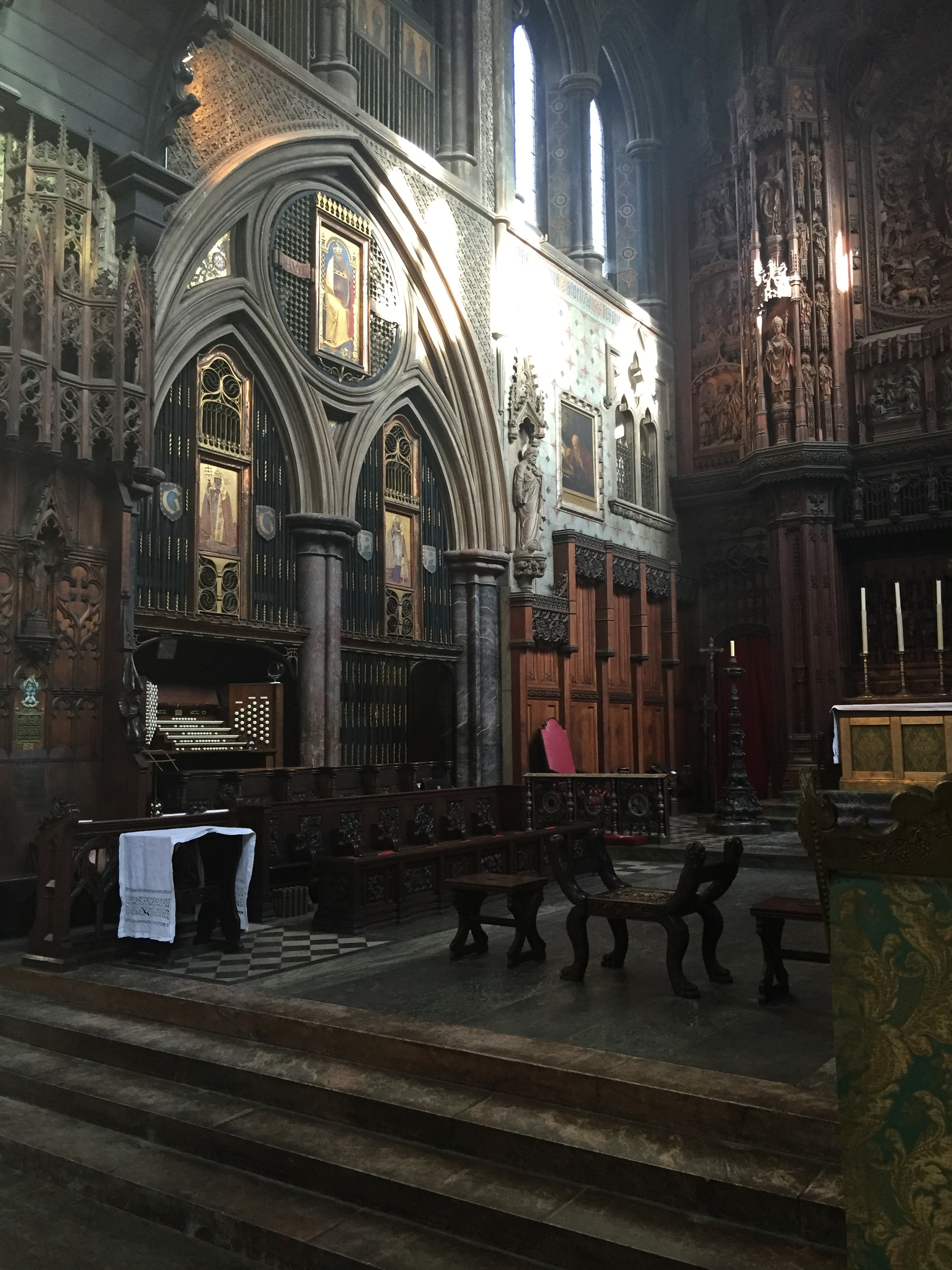
Organ and Screen

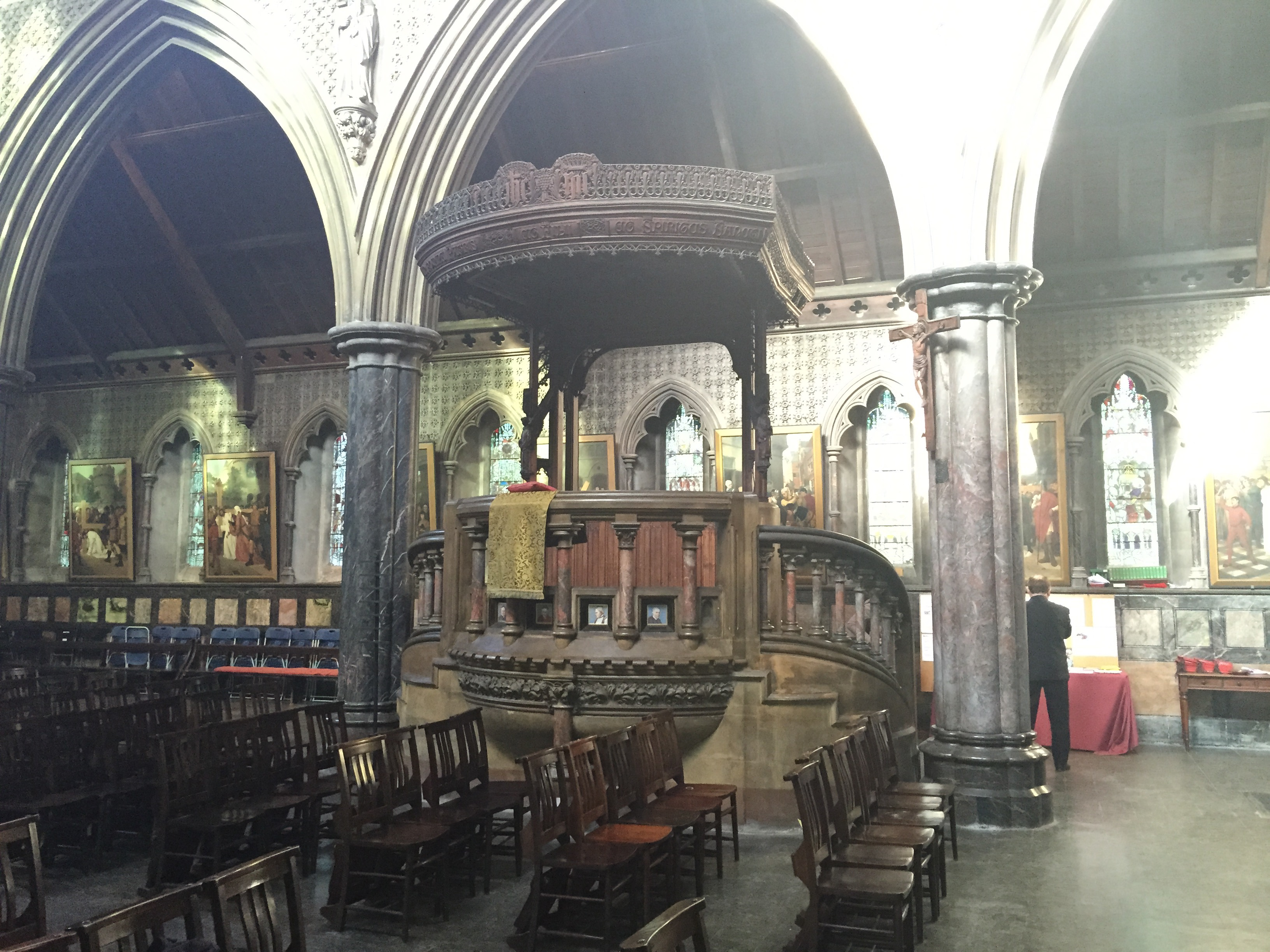
Pulpit and Sounding Board

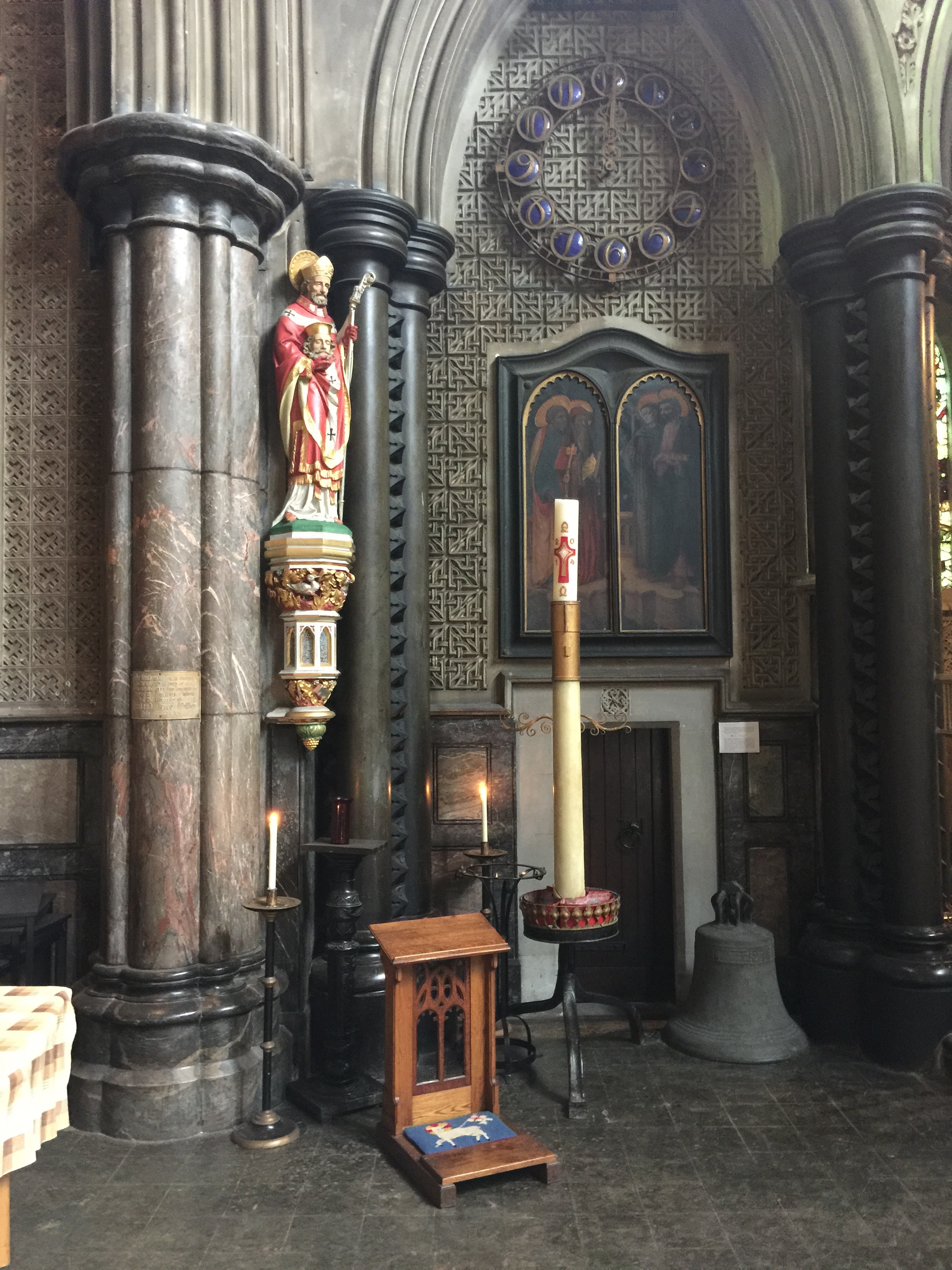
St Cuthbert Paschal Candle and Clock

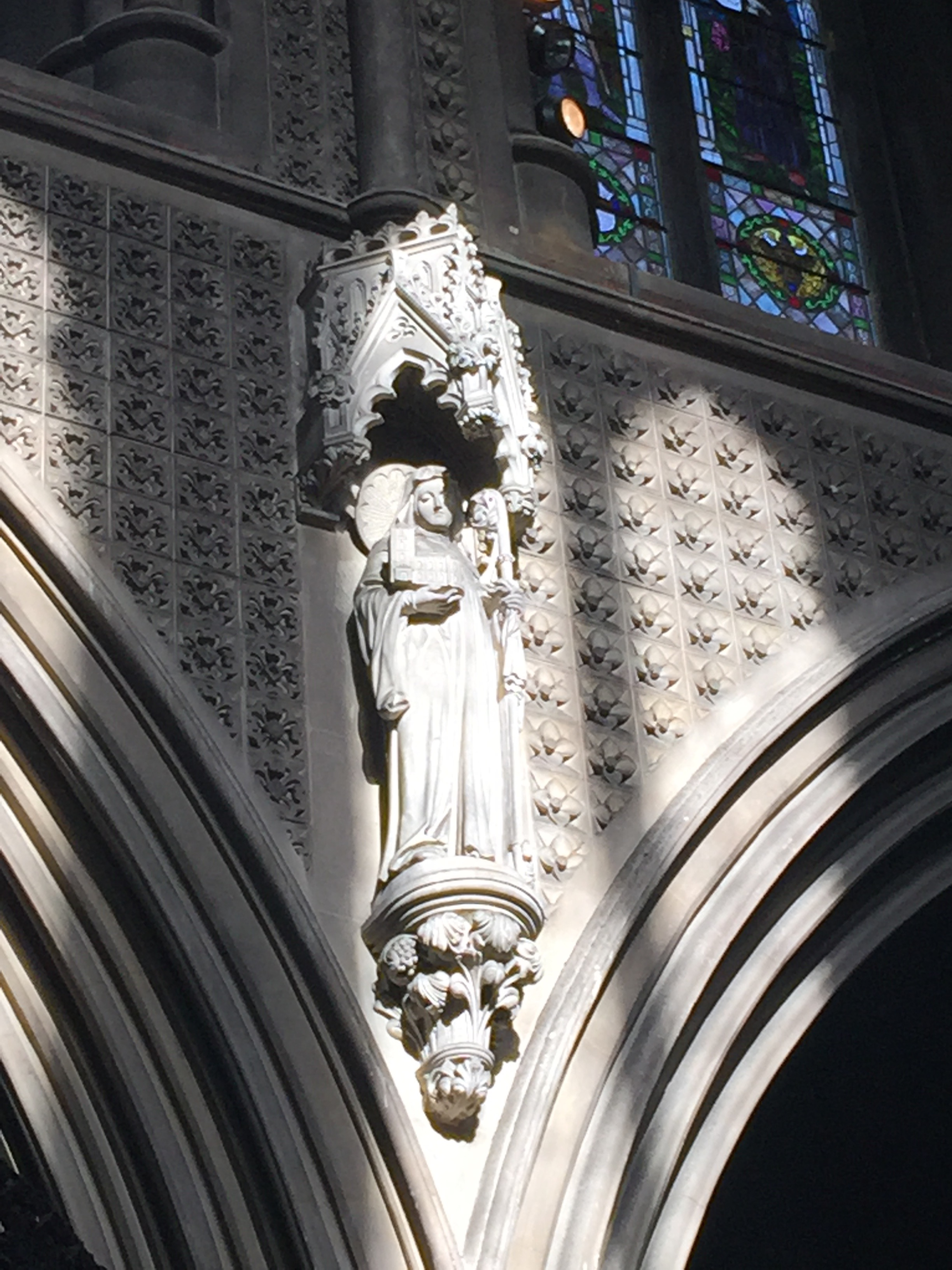
St Hilda North Clerestory

== Anglo-Catholicism ==
The church's style of worship is Anglo-Catholic, "the Catholic faith as taught by the Church of England", offering members and visitors a traditional style of liturgy, as advocated by the Oxford Movement of the mid-nineteenth century, including ritual, choir and organ music, vestments and incense.

Masses are now generally according to the liturgy of Common Worship (with the High Mass on Sunday according to Order 1 in traditional language), the offices are also prayed according to Common Worship.

== Incumbents ==
- 1883–1924: Henry Westall
- 1925–1936: Frederick Goldsworthy Croom
- 1936–1961: Charles Lewis Gage-Brown
- 1961–1969: Gerard Irvine
- 1969–2013: John Vine
- 2013–present: Paul Bagott

== Services ==
- Sunday
  - Morning Prayer at 09.30 am
  - Family Mass at 10.00 am
  - High Mass at 11.00 am
  - Evensong & Benediction at 6.00 pm
- Tuesday to Friday
  - Morning Prayer at 9.00 am
  - Evening Prayer at 6.00 pm
  - Low Mass at 6.30 pm (Tuesday & Thursday)
- Saturday
  - Morning Prayer at 10.00 am
  - Low Mass at 10.30 am
  - Evening Prayer at 6.00 pm
- Weekday Solemnities (please see notices)
