= Florent Mols =

Belgian painter (1811–1896)

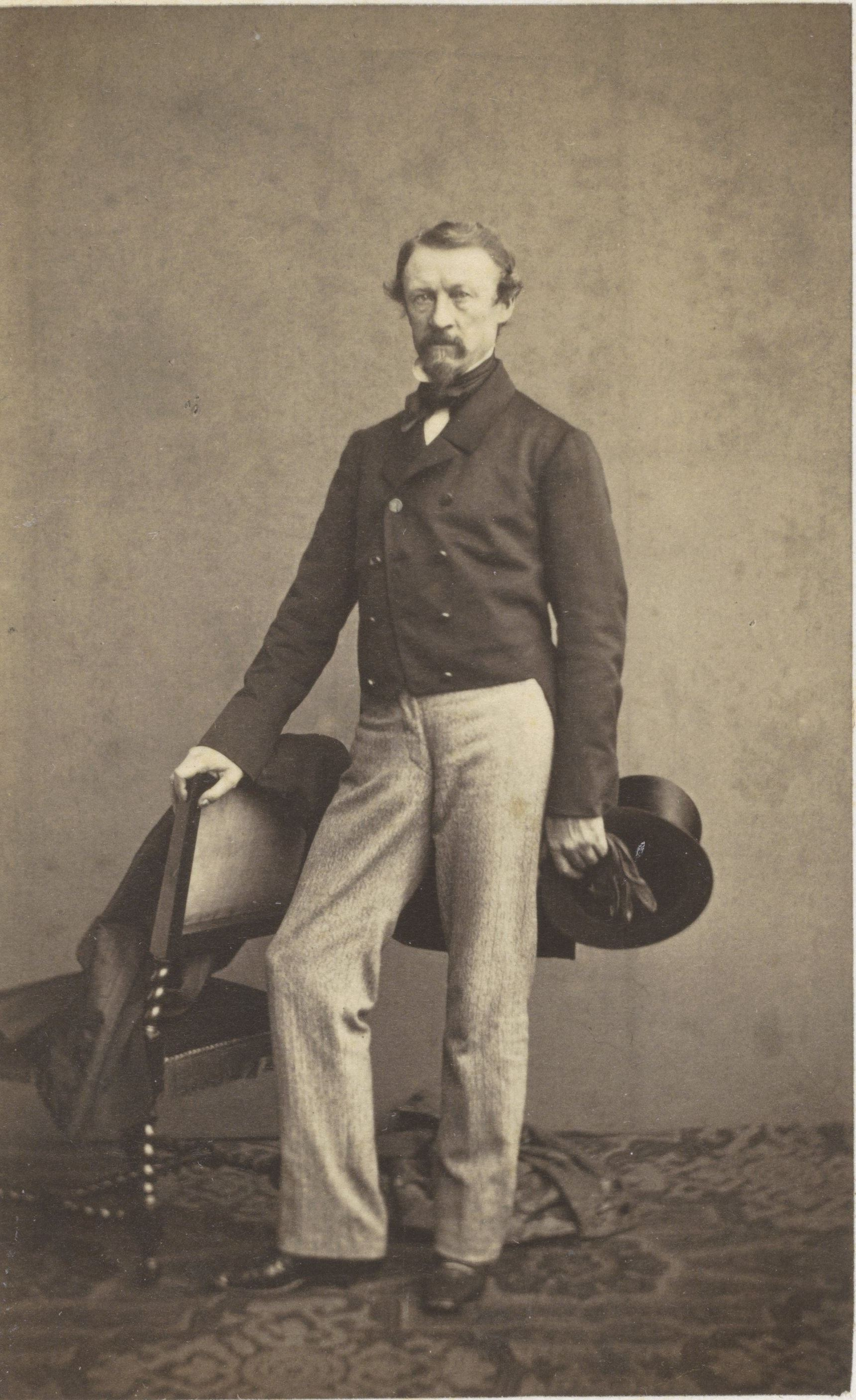
Florent Mols (1860s)

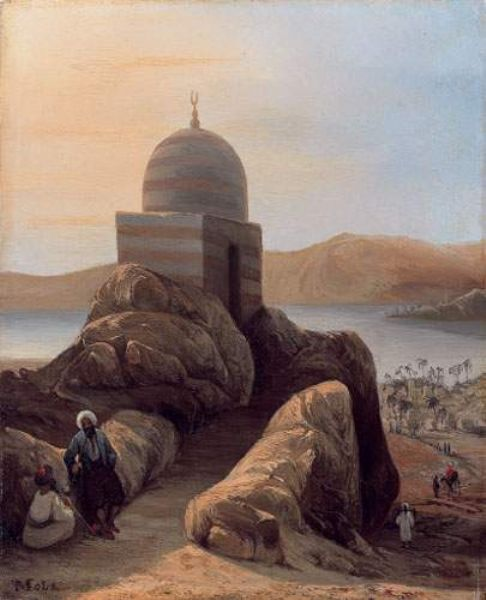
The Mausoleum

Florent Mols (11 March 1811, Antwerp – 17 January 1896, Antwerp) was a Belgian painter who specialized in landscapes and genre scenes. His most familiar works were created as a result of trips to Greece and Egypt.

== Biography ==
He was born to the Jonkheer François Mols (1767–1845), and his wife, Theresa Van de Zanden (1781–1813). His primary art lessons came from Ferdinand de Braekeleer and Mattheus Ignatius van Bree at the Royal Academy of Fine Arts.

In 1838, he travelled to Egypt and the Middle East in the company of the noted art patron, Charles Stier d’Aertselaer (1770–1847). While in Ankara, he met and befriended his fellow Belgian painter, Jacob Jacobs, and they continued travelling together; taking the Nile as far as Nubia. Later that year, they were in Egypt at the same time as David Roberts, and worked together, sketching ancient monuments.

He later took a second trip to Egypt with the history painter, Franz Vinck. After returning through Alexandria, they visited Greece, then crossed to Trieste and made their way through Austria and Germany to Saint Petersburg. Near the end of 1839, he returned to Antwerp through Northern Germany. He brought a few antiquities with him, as well as Arabic and Coptic manuscripts.

He married Elise-Hubertine Brialmont (1822–1894) in 1842. They had four children: Léonie-Marie, who became an art collector and patron, Marie-Clementine, Robert, who also became a painter, and Alexis.
