= Franz Vinck =

Belgian painter

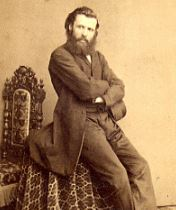
- Franz Vinck (date unknown)
- Born: 14 September 1827; Antwerp
- Died: 17 October 1903 (aged 76); Berchem
- Education: Royal Academy of Fine Arts (Antwerp)
- Known for: Painter, teacher
- Movement: Orientalist

Franz Vinck or Frans Vinck (14 September 1827 – 17 October 1903) was a Belgian painter known for his history paintings, genre and Orientalist scenes and portraits. He led a peripatetic life style and travelled and worked in many countries.

== Life ==
Vinck was born in Antwerp. His father was a bookkeeper at the local gin distiller Louis Meeus. As a child Vinck took drawing lessons with the painter Karel Schippers, the fiancé of a cousin. His parents wanted him to study the violin at the Conservatory of Brussels, but instead he enrolled at the Royal Academy of Fine Arts (Koninklijke Academie voor Schone Kunsten) in Antwerp. His teachers at the academy included Edward Dujardin and Josephus Laurentius Dyckmans.

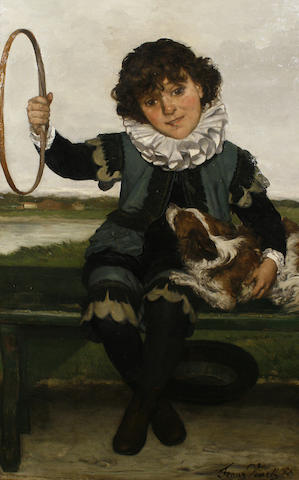
Portrait of a boy with a Cavalier King Charles Spaniel and hoop

In 1846 Vinck debuted at the Salon of Antwerp with his work Joseph with the wife of Putifar. The painting was subsequently exhibited in Philadelphia in the United States after which it disappeared without a trace. The artist lost as a result the money that a buyer had already offered for the work.

Vinck subsequently traveled with a fellow painter to Paris where he copied old masters in the Louvre. After his return to Antwerp in 1852, he participated in the Prix de Rome. He made it through the pre-selection, but lost out to Ferdinand Pauwels who won first prize. His father's employer generously offered to fund Vinck so that he could accompany the winner Pauwels to Italy. After leaving for Rome, he lingered in Paris where he met Gustaf Wappers, the leading Belgian Romantic painter who had fled Antwerp after his voluntary resignation from his post as director of the Antwerp Academy.

After nine months in Paris, Vinck finally left for Rome. Here he painted a composition called The consequences of the seven deadly sins of humanity. After he sent it to Antwerp the work was met with success and the Belgian government awarded the artist a grant.

In 1856 Vinck returned to Antwerp. The painter Florent Mols (1811–1896) invited Vinck to join him on a trip to the Middle East. The painter accepted the invitation and subsequently spent a year travelling in Egypt and Palestine. After his marriage in 1859 Vinck settled in Brussels. Here he remained until 1866. Failing to achieve success in the Belgian capital, he returned to his home town. There Vinck got included in the small circle of students and assistants of Henri Leys, at the time the leading Belgian Romantic painter who enjoyed an international reputation. Under the influence of Leys he started to concentrate more on history paintings rather than religious paintings.

He became a teacher at the Academy of Fine Arts and the Academy of Dendermonde. In Dendermonde Franz Courtens was one of his pupils. When in January 1886 Vincent van Gogh matriculated at the Antwerp Academy, van Gogh got into trouble with a number of his teachers including Vinck who was the instructor of the drawing class.

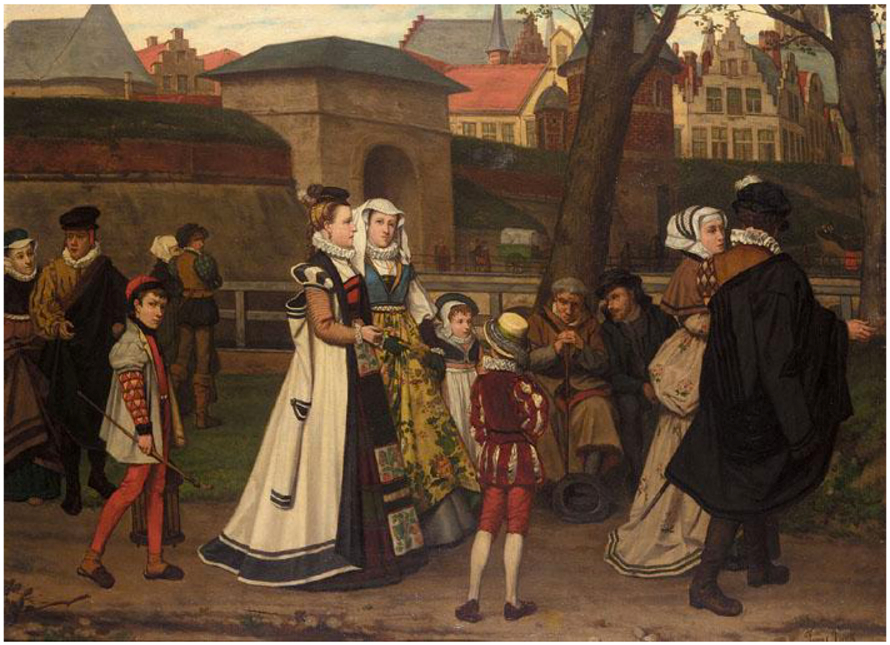
Medieval street scene

In Antwerp, Vinck obtained many official commissions such as that for decorations in the meeting room of the Antwerp City Hall. He also painted seven Stations of the Cross for Antwerp Cathedral). He further obtained commissions from abroad including for more Stations of the Cross for the Saint-Nicholas Church in Boulogne-sur-Mer in France and St Cuthbert's, Earls Court in London. The artist earned awards in exhibitions in Brussels, Vienna, London, Lyon and Philadelphia.

He died on 3 October 1903 at his home in Berchem.

== Work ==
Vinck is known primarily for his religious and historical paintings. He was also drawn towards the then popular Orientalism and created a number of Orientalist paintings inspired by his travels in the Middle East.

As a painter of history paintings Vinck took his principal direction from Leys. Leys had made a name with his meticulously painted historical scenes recounting major events from Belgium's national history, which were regarded as a key to the country's national identity.. Vinck produced a number of history paintings that were inspired by important episodes in Belgium's history such as the Crowning of Margaretha of Parma (At Rossini on 8 December 2010 in Paris, lot 46). His palette was generally lighter than that of Leys.

Like Leys and his teacher Josephus Laurentius Dyckmans, he also took inspiration from 17th century genre painting. Some of his scenes set in the past such as The Skaters (At Christie's on 7 December 2000 in London lot 217) do not represent important historic events but are rather in the nature of genre scenes.

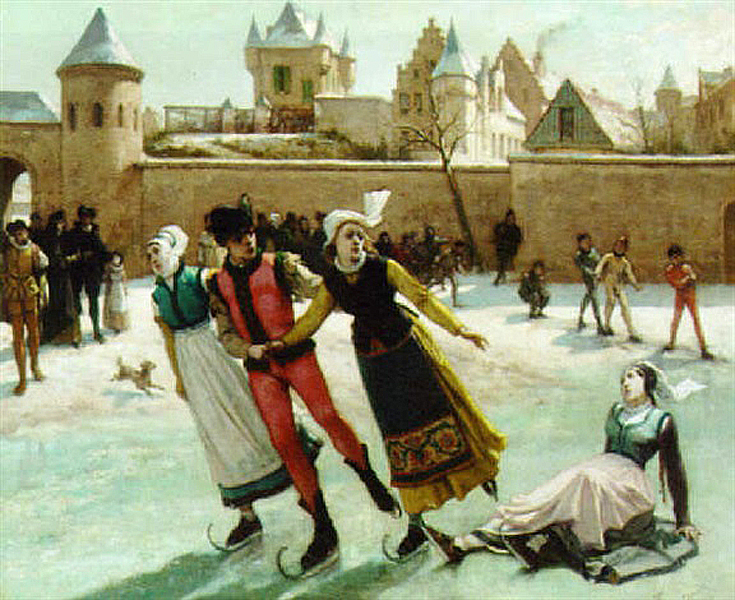
The Skaters

Vinck painted a number of Orientalist paintings, clearly inspired by his visit to the Middle East. An example is Lunch at the foot of the pyramids, Gizeh (At Christie's, 16 July 2003, Paris lot 39). In sharp contrast to the French Orientalist Théodore Frère for whom a vision of an eternal East, unaffected by modern western concerns, was paramount, Vinck depicted in this composition the meeting between East and West. In the Lunch at the foot of the pyramids, Gizeh Vinck sets out the principal figures in an almost theatrical way, capturing in strong chiaroscuro the fascination and reservation with which East began to meet West at the end of the 19th century, a time when tourism became a fashionable pursuit for the European and North American middle classes.
