= Jan Geeraerts =

Belgian painter

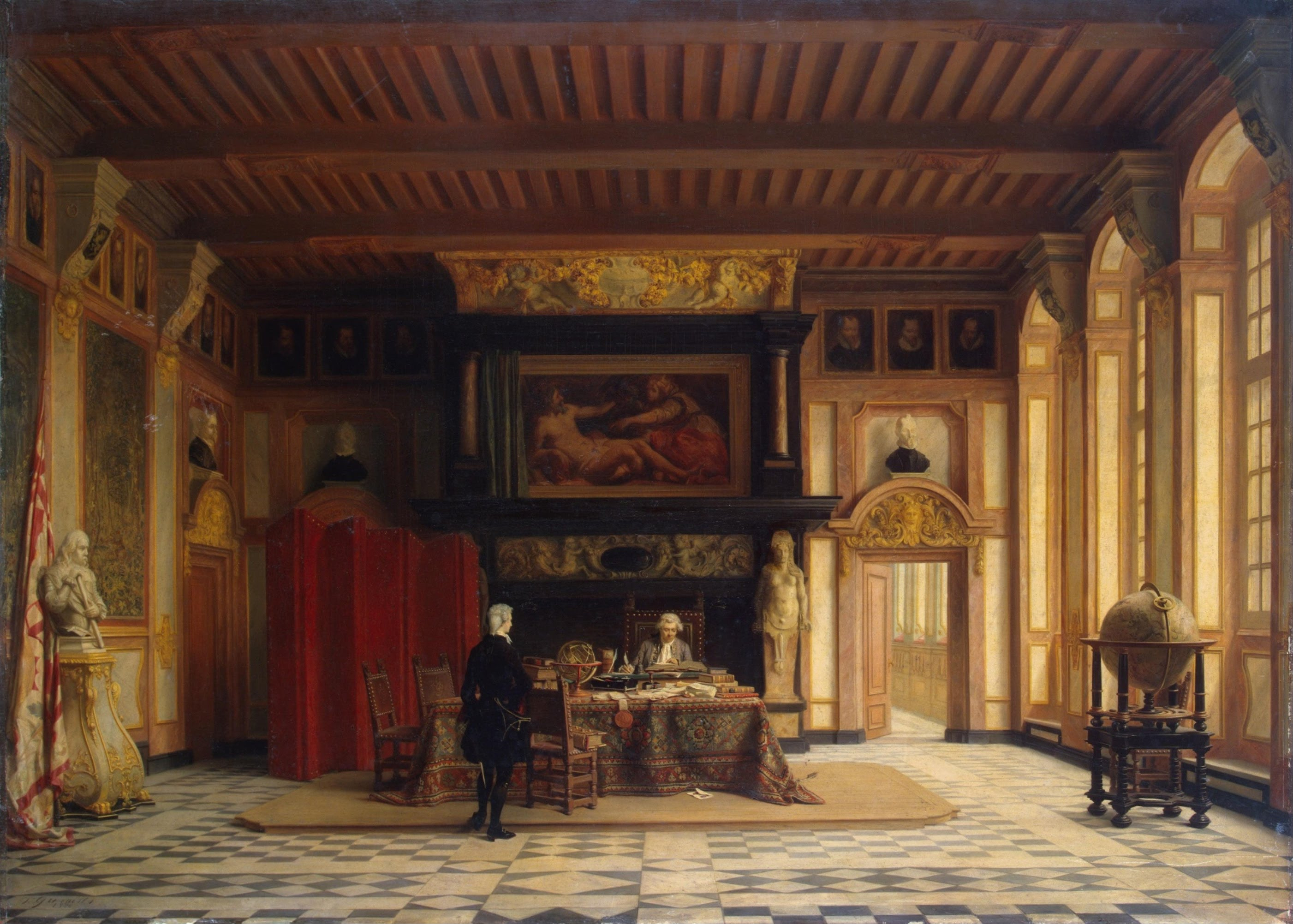
Hall of Estates at the Antwerp City Hall

Jan Geeraerts (15 May 1814 – Antwerp) was a Belgian painter. He is known for his realist interiors of churches and other ancient buildings. He also painted genre scenes and religious subjects.

== Life ==
Jan Geeraerts was born in Antwerp on 15 May 1814. He became a student at the Academy of Antwerp where he studied, amongst others, under the genre painter Josephus Laurentius Dyckmans He participated in the Salons in Antwerp, Brussels and Ghent.

Geeraerts lived at 118 Lange Leemstraat in Antwerp. He died in Antwerp on 9 January 1890.

== Works ==
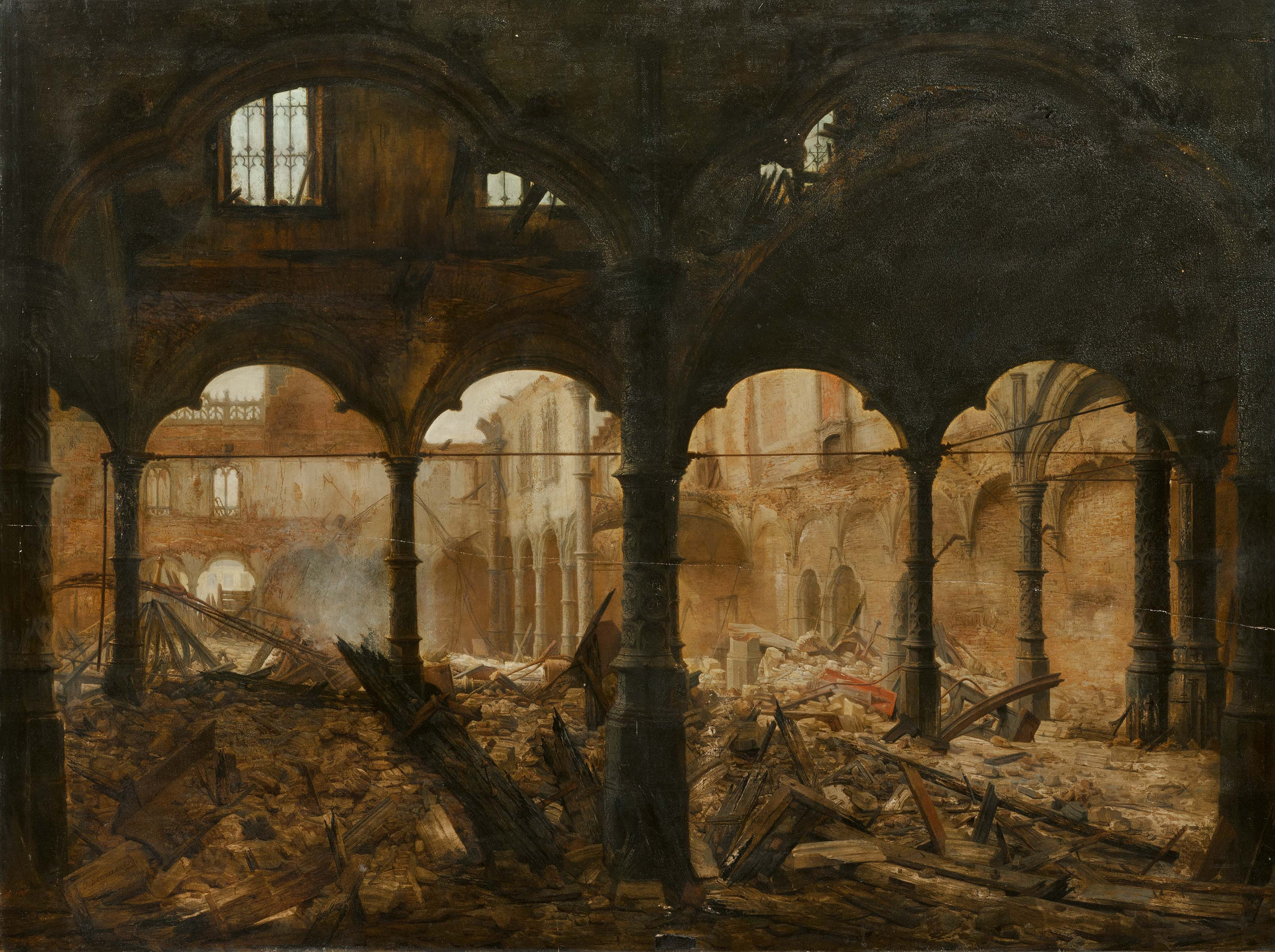
The Ruins of the Trading Exchange in Antwerp

Geeraerts painted mainly interiors of churches and picturesque old buildings. He also painted genre scenes and religious subjects. The church interior was a genre practiced in Northern European painting since the 16th century. In the 19th century a few Belgian artists were also specialised in this genre including artists such as: Bernard Neyt, Jules-Victor Genisson, Joseph-Chrétien Nicolié, André-Joseph Minguet and Joseph Maswiens.

Geeraerts' church interiors generally depict Antwerp churches such as in the Interior of the St. Paul's church in Antwerp (Royal Museum of Fine Arts Antwerp). He also painting of the interior of the Nieuwe Kerk in Delft with a view of the mausoleum of William the Silent. He also painted in 1873 in frightening detail the ruins of the Antwerp stock exchange which had burned down 15 years earlier.
