= Hugh Roumieu Gough =

English architect

Hugh Roumieu Gough FRIBA (1843–1904) was an English architect who practised mainly in the London area.

== Family ==
Born in Islington, London, he was the son of the architect Alexander Dick Gough (who at the time was working in partnership with Robert Lewis Roumieu) and Marie Curtis.

== Career ==
After being articled to his father, Gough studied in France, Germany, Belgium and Holland before joining the War Department in 1864, serving as chief draughtsman at the Royal Arsenal in Woolwich from 1865 to 1866. He entered private practice in 1870.

In 1879 Gough was elected a Fellow of the Royal Institute of British Architects (FRIBA) and served two terms as President of the Society of Architects (1885–1886 and 1886–1887).

== Notable works ==
Notable works include:

- 1878-1879: Army and Navy Club, London (dining room and smoking room)
- 1882: St Bartholomew's, Greens Norton, Northamptonshire (chancel arch)
- 1882: St Peter's, Greatworth, Northamptonshire (chancel arch)
- 1882-1883: St Paul's, Hammersmith, London (with John Pollard Seddon)
- 1884-1887: St Cuthbert's, Earls Court, London
- 1887: St Stephen's, Gloucester Road, London (octagonal vestry and lady chapel

He died in Fulham, London, on 6 November 1904 and is buried in Hammersmith Cemetery.
