= Jan Verhas =

19th-century Belgian Realist painter

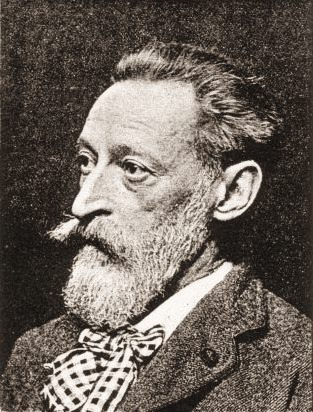
- Portrait of Jan Verhas (date unknown)
- Born: Jan Frans Verhas; 9 January 1834; Dendermonde, Belgium
- Died: 31 October 1896 (aged 62); Schaerbeek, Belgium
- Education: Academy of Dendermonde

Jan Verhas or Jan Frans Verhas (9 January 1834 – 31 October 1896) was a Belgian painter of the Realist school. He was known for his portraits and genre paintings often depicting children of the Belgian bourgeoisie. Jan Verhas also painted history paintings, coastal landscapes, beach scenes, seascapes and the occasional still life of flowers. He was an important representative of the Realist movement in Belgium.

== Life ==
Jan Verhas was born in Dendermonde as the son of Emmanuel Verhas. His father was a painter who for twenty years was a teacher at the local Academy and also served as a director of that Academy. Jan received his initial art training from his father as did his older brother Frans). Just like Jan, his brother Frans became a successful artist.

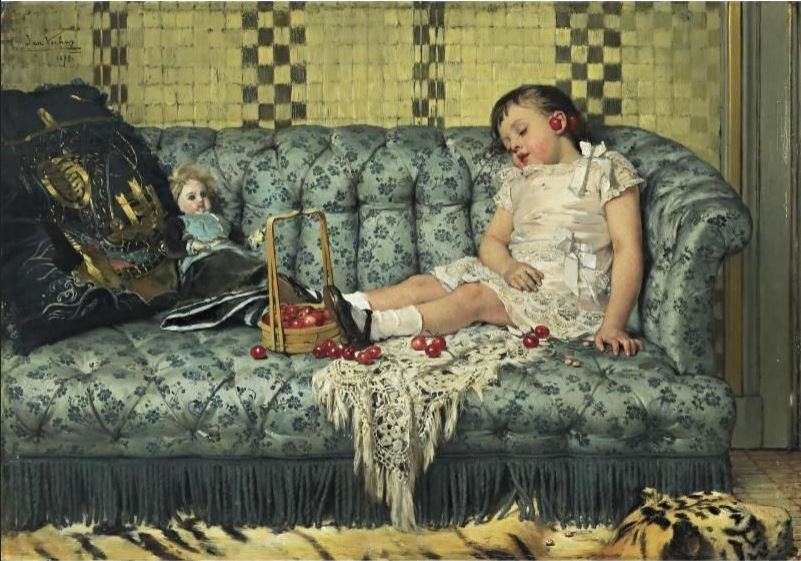
The nap

Verhas studied initially at the Academy of Fine Arts in his hometown Dendermonde and from 1853 onwards at the Royal Academy of Fine Arts of Antwerp. His teachers at the Antwerp Academy included Nicaise de Keyser and Jan Antoon Verschaeren. Nicaise de Keyser was a painter of mainly history paintings and portraits and one of the key figures in the Belgian Romantic-historical school of painting. Verhas' fellow students at the Academy included the Dutch painter Lawrence Alma-Tadema and Karel Ooms. Verhas struck up a life-long friendship with them.

Verhas completed his studies in 1860. After spending a few months in Paris he participated in the same year in the Belgian Prix de Rome. He was awarded the second prize in the competition. This meant he did not win the large stipend that came with the first prize. Still, the Belgian government awarded him a special subsidy of 1,200 francs and commissioned from him a composition depicting the Battle of Kallo.

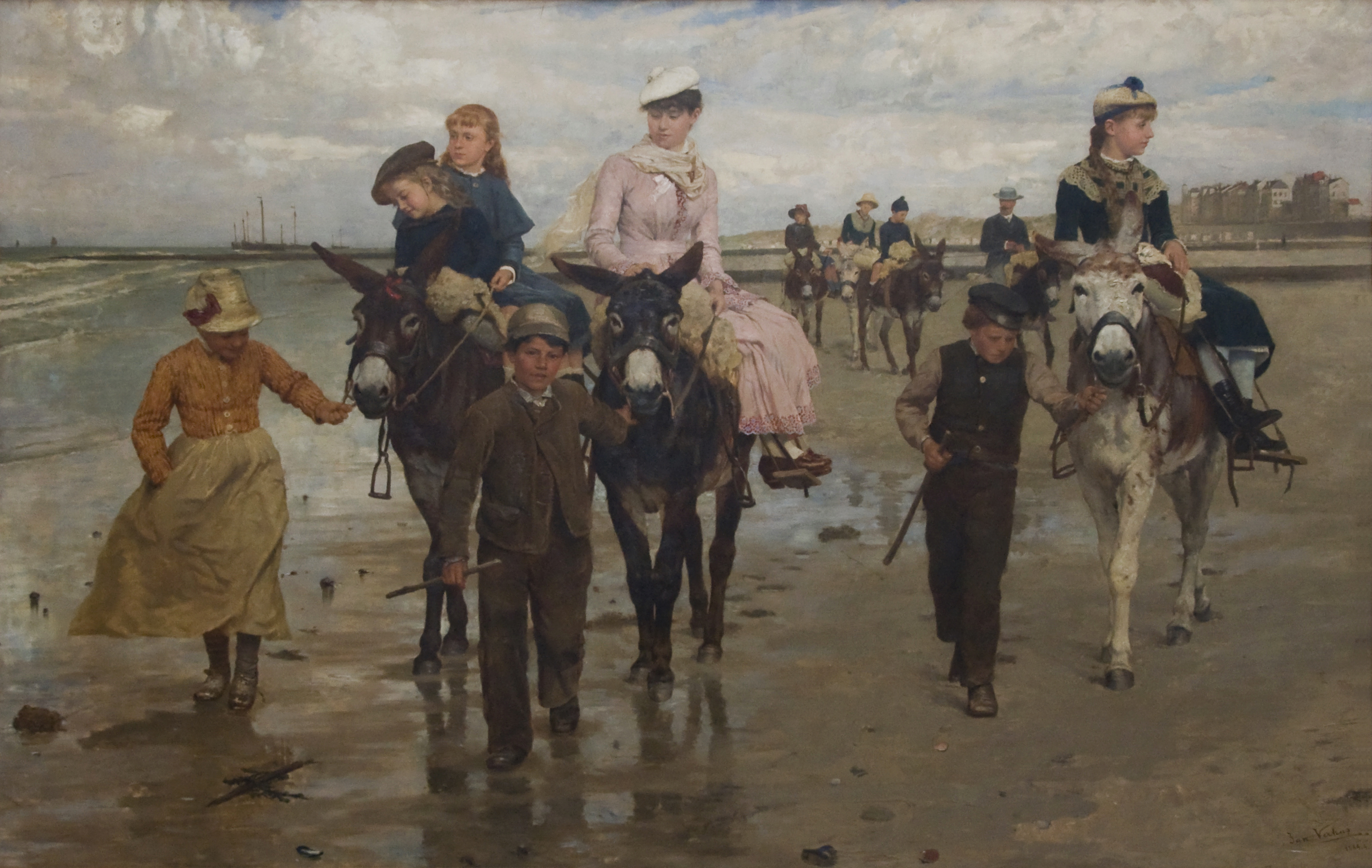
Donkey ride on the beach

In 1862 he travelled via Paris and Lyon to Italy, where he made stops in Turin, Milan and Venice. He remained in Venice for two to three months, studying and copying the masters. Lack of funds forced him to leave Italy. He travelled back via Paris where his brother Frans was working at the time. Jan assisted his brother in the execution of several decorative projects. Afterwards he resided in Antwerp. Here he made a living as a portrait artist and finished the composition of the Battle of Kallo in 1863.

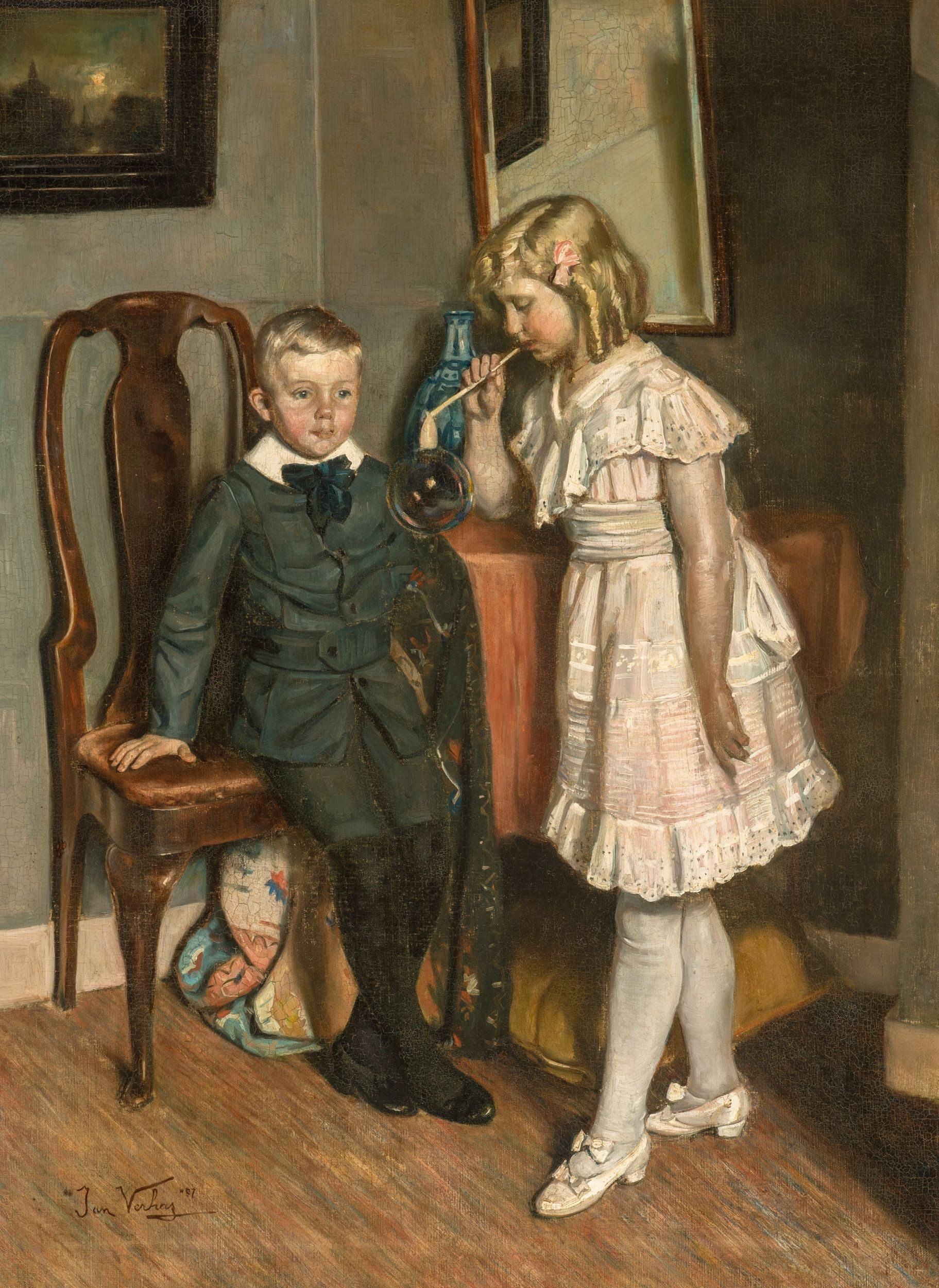
Children blowing bubbles

From 1864 to 1867 the artist lived in Binche as he had fallen in love with and married a woman from that town. His wife was the aunt of Louise Ponselet-Saintenoy. A daughter born from his marriage married later the painter and jurist Gisbert Combaz.

Verhas settled in Brussels in 1867. He then largely abandoned history painting in favor of depictions of scenes from contemporary life. He was encouraged in this by Lawrence Alma-Tadema who was then living in Brussels. From that time his career took off as he received many official as well as private commissions including for portraits of children and genre scenes with children. Starting from 1882 Verhas abandoned his scenes of bourgeois interiors with children. He started to spend time in Heist-aan-Zee on the Belgian coast where he explored new themes and the practice of plein air painting. The artist devoted himself to the representation of lively scenes he witnessed in the coastal area: children playing on the beach, elegant ladies making donkey rides, local processions as well as portraits of local characters.

Verhas made a number of trips including to Berlin where he met Adolph Menzel and to Munich and London where he met up with his old friend Lawrence Alma-Tadema. He painted a picture of the opulent residence of Alma-Tadema in London.

Verhas regularly contributed works to the various Salons of his time. He won a second class medal in the Paris Salon of 1881 and gold medals at the Berlin exhibition of 1883 and the Exposition Universelle of 1889.

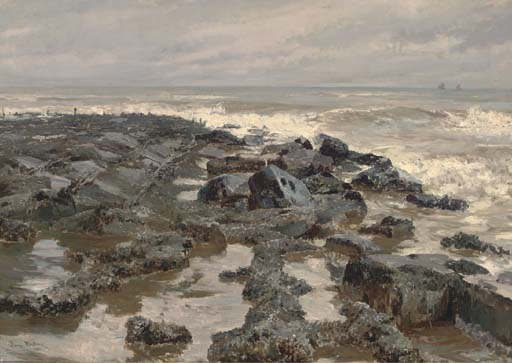
After the storm

Verhas received several official distinctions. The Belgian government made him an Officer in the Order of Leopold and the French government made him a Chevalier (Knight) in the Legion of Honour in 1881.

Jan Verhas died in Schaerbeek in 1896.

== Work ==
Verhas was known for his genre paintings often involving children of the Belgian bourgeoisie. He painted portraits of persons from the political and artistic world. Jan Verhas commenced his career as a history painter in the Belgian Romantic style. In his later period he created coastal landscapes, beach scenes, and the occasional still life of flowers. He was also a fresco painter who painted a number of historical frescoes in the city hall of his hometown Dendermonde.

His earliest works dealt with history subjects and were executed in the Romantic style which was then in vogue in Belgian academic circles. His most important work from this period is the Battle of Kallo of 1863 (City Hall of Kallo), in which he depicts a cavalry skirmish in a whirlwind of figures.

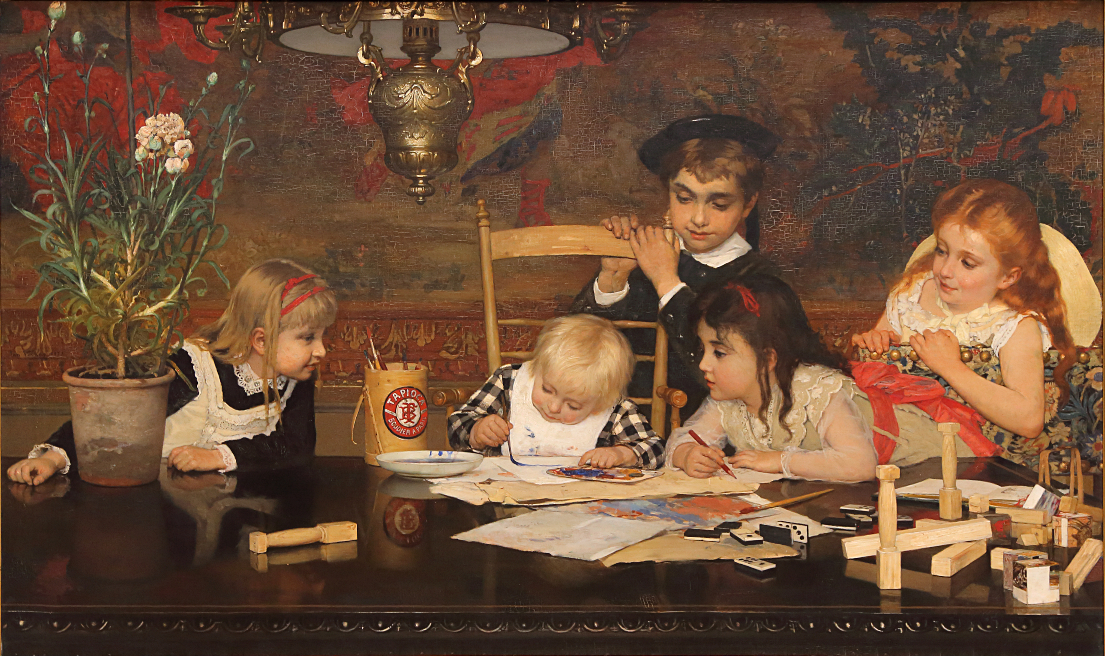
The Master Painter

After moving to Brussels, he gradually developed his own Realist approach to rendering scenes of everyday life with a humoristic touch. His favourite subject were children engaged in some innocent activity or mischief. The settings of these scenes were typically interiors of bourgeois residences, princely libraries and large terraces with rich decorations and opulent furniture and accessories. These works show a certain indebtedness to Alma-Tadema in the lines of the composition. His masterpiece in this genre was The Master Painter (Museum of Fine Arts, Ghent), which he contributed to the Salon of Ghent in 1877. This composition shows five children of different ages in an opulent room gathered on one side of a black shining table on which various toys are laying about. The youngest of the children, a boy wearing a bib, is shown in the middle concentrating on making his first brushstroke while his brother and sisters are looking on with encouraging and endeared gazes. The children's relaxed and natural appearance gives the scene the feeling of a casual snapshot. The warm color palette, the decorative background and the lavish furniture and delicate clothes of the children accentuate the bourgeois atmosphere. The whole composition is executed in a naturalistic, almost photo-realistic, style with attention to the accurate rendering of the different materials.

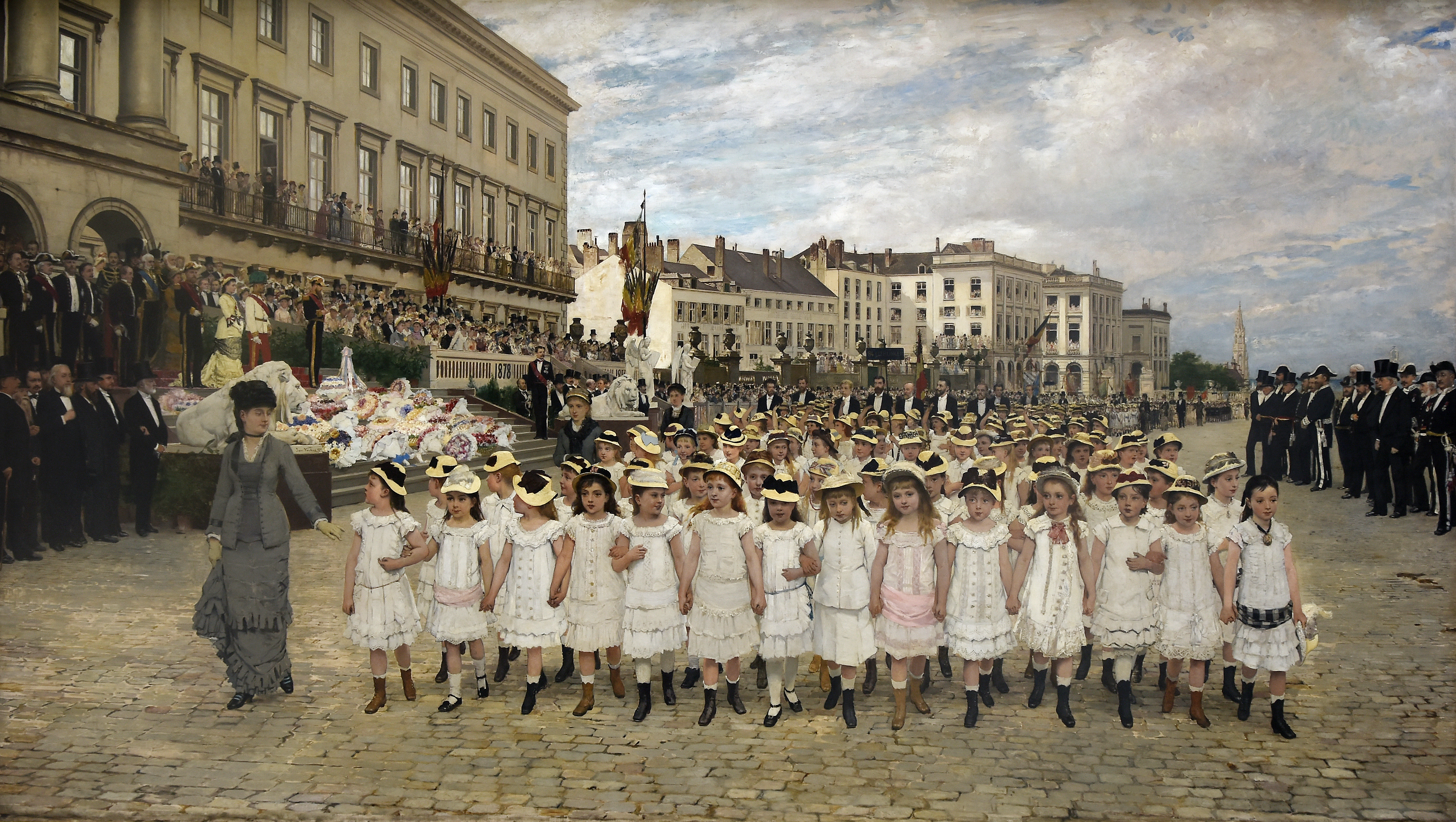
The parade of the schools of 1878 in the presence of King Leopold II

One of Verhas' best known works is The parade of the schools of 1878 in the presence of King Leopold II. This enormous canvas represents the parade of 23,000 pupils from all neighborhoods of the recently modernized Brussels and other parts of Belgium which was held on 23 August 1878 to celebrate the silver wedding of King Leopold II and Queen Marie-Henriette. Leopold II strongly promoted this type of event in Belgium as they bolstered his vision of a united country. Verhas captured in this work with photographic fidelity the magnificently orchestrated spectacle of the parade. The schoolgirls are marching in strict rows on the foreground of the composition. Their uniform white dresses and golden-yellow hats give the girls a feeling of unity, while their faces are clearly individual portraits. In fact, of many of the girls the identity is known as they included daughters of prominent personalities. On a podium on the left of the picture the royal couple and members of the Belgian elite are portrayed. This painting was in its time received as a reassuring message regarding the future prosperity and unity of the Belgian nation. The painting brought together themes such as family spirit, patriotism, continuity, a familiar and encouraging modernity, and recognizable personalities. Despite the modernity of the painting, it achieved the status of a bourgeois icon. The canvas became in the Belgium of the 1880s a textbook example of academic taste and patriotism. Its popularity was further enhanced thanks to the sale of photomechanical reproductions. As a result, Verhas became one of Belgium's most celebrated painters as well as a rich man. In the artistic development of Verhas, The parade of the schools of 1878 in the presence of King Leopold II signified a move towards a clearer palette.

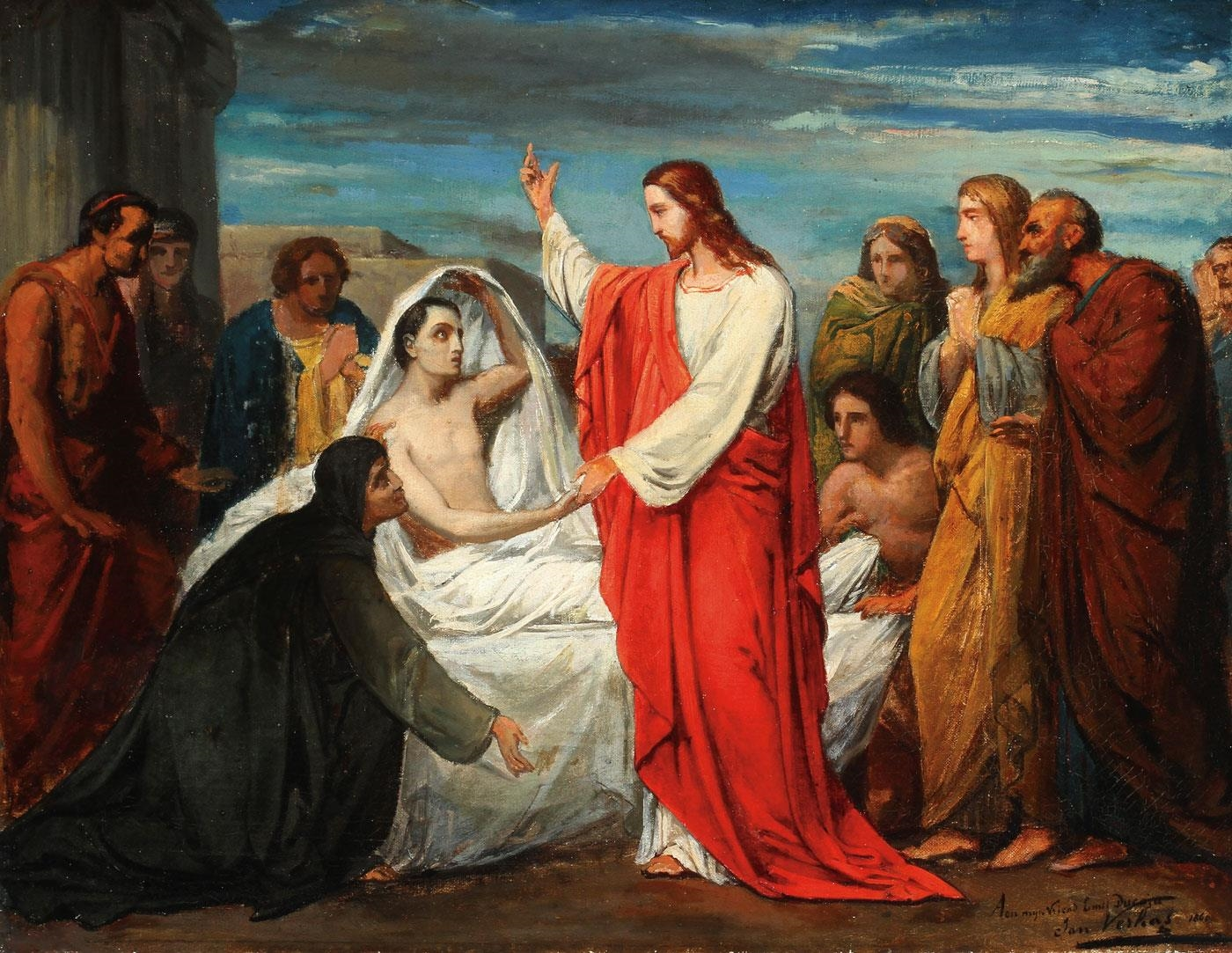
The raising of the widow's son in Nain, 1860

In the final period of his artistic activity Verhas was inspired by his experiences during his lengthy stays at the Belgian coast. Here he not only observed the tourists but also the local people and customs. Working en plein air he created lively, sun-drenched scenes set on or near the beach. A representative work from this period is the Donkey ride on the beach, which shows a bourgeois family riding donkeys on the beach. The family members are all dressed in fine clothes while the donkeys are being led by local children in plain clothes.
