= Eliza Turck =

English painter

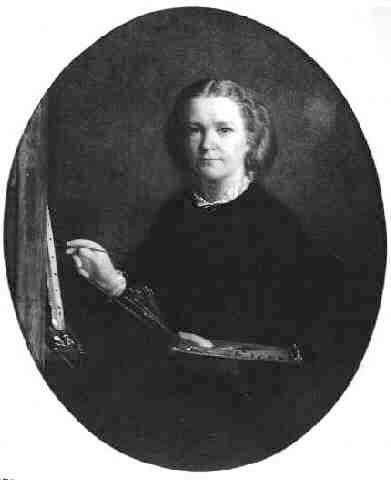
Eliza Turck (1860)

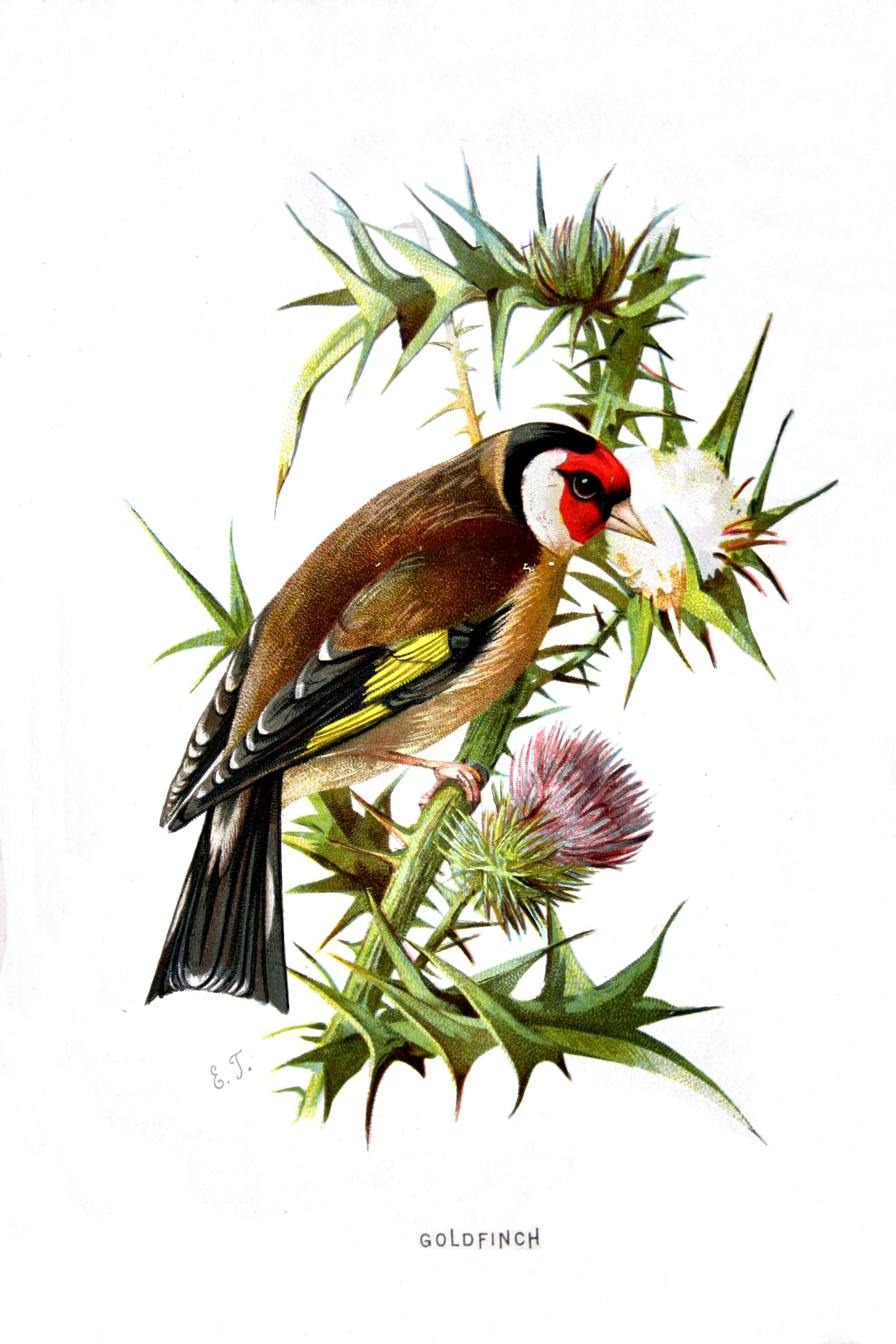
European goldfinch Familiar Wild Birds (1883)

Eliza Turck (1832–1910), was an English portrait (including miniatures), genre, bird and landscape painter, illustrator and writer.

== Life and work ==
Turck was born in Islington in London, where she showed an early aptitude for art and received lessons from her mother, Anne Louisa Tielkens (b. 1799 London), who was a talented amateur artist. Her father was Herman Jochim Christian Turck, a banker (b. 1792 Bailiwick of Guernsey). Eliza was educated initially in Germany and on her return to England, in 1848, studied for 6 months at Cary's School of Art in London. Afterwards, she took lessons in oil painting from William Gale, and, in 1852, entered the figure class of the Female School of Art in Gower Street for a further year. She studied for 14 months, from 1859 to 1860, at the Royal Academy of Fine Arts in Antwerp, Belgium, and was given some instruction by Nicaise de Keyser, the director.

Turck exhibited at the Royal Academy from 1854, and also at the British Institution, Suffolk Street and elsewhere. Her work included genre paintings, literary subjects, coastal scenes, architecture, birds and miniatures, painted in oil or watercolour. Her works at the Royal Academy included ‘Rus in Urbe’, 1858, ‘Lady Dorothy in Breton Costume’, 1880 and ‘In St. Mark's, Venice’, 1885. Her Royal Academy picture of 1856 ‘Cinderella’ was one of forty pictures selected by John Ruskin for criticism in his Academy Notes: “Very pretty, and well studied, but Cinderella does not look the lady of the fairy tale. I am rather puzzled myself to know how her relationship to her remarkable godmother could best be indicated so as to leave her still a quite real little lady in a real kitchen. But I am glad to see this sternly realistic treatment, at all events’.

She exhibited at the International Exhibition in 1871, and her watercolours of Brittany were shown at Rogers Gallery, Maddox Street in 1879. About these The Art Journal wrote: ‘Her colouring is close to nature and full of tender greys, especially in the sky, while her touch is broad, free and Cox-like.’

She provided many illustrations for the 1883 edition of W. Swaysland's 4-volume "Familiar Wild birds" She also wrote "A practical handbook to marqueterie wood-staining and kindred arts" (pub. L. Upcott Gill, 1899).

She never married, and died in London on April 10th 1910
