= Water Music =

Three suites by Handel

- Orchestral suites by George Frideric Handel
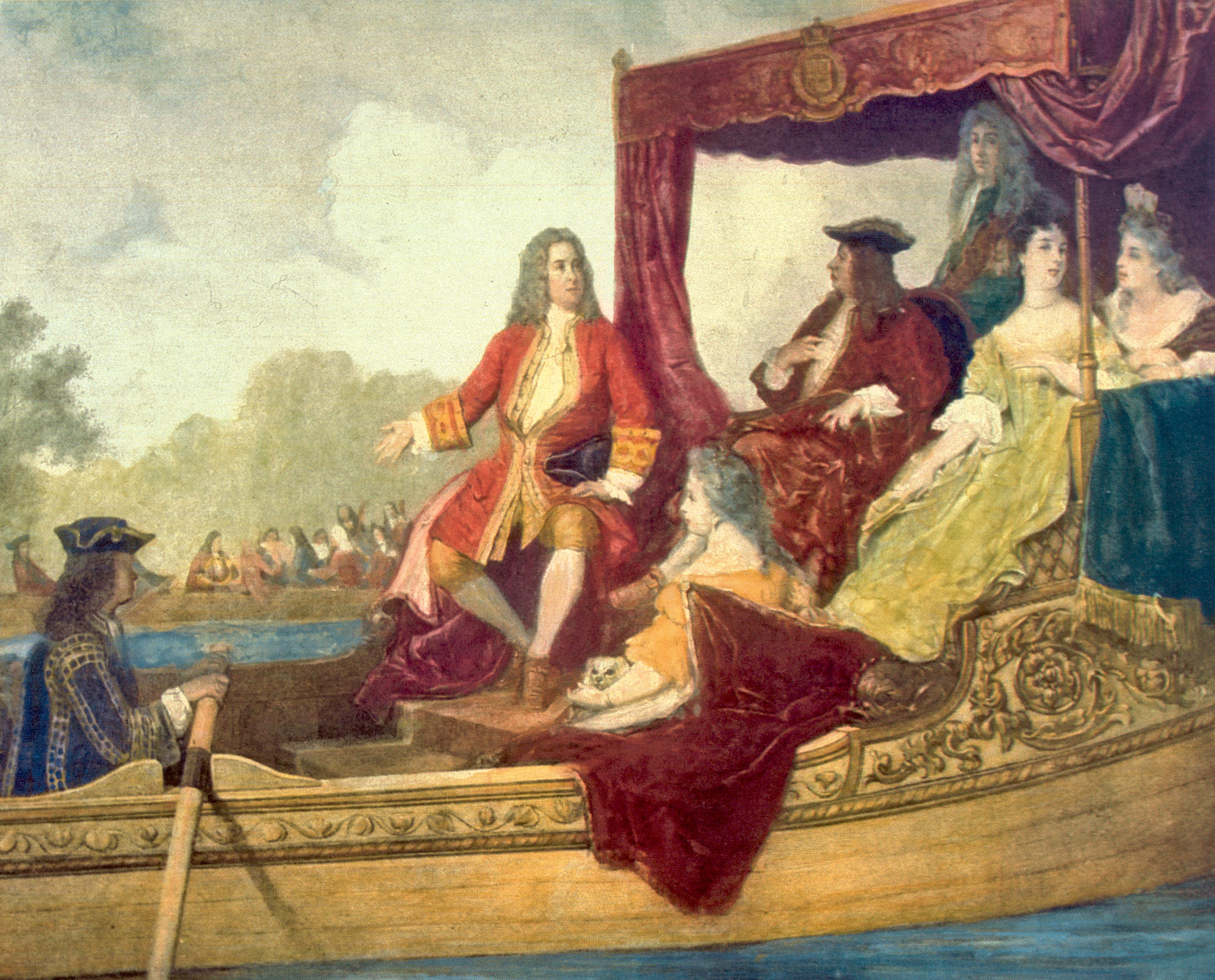
- Handel (left) and King George I on the River Thames, 17 July 1717; painting by Edouard Hamman
- Catalogue: HWV 348, 349, 350
- Year: 1717
- Period: Baroque
- Performed: July 17, 1717; 309 years ago London, England

The Water Music (German: Wassermusik) is a collection of orchestral movements, often published as three suites, composed by George Frideric Handel. It premiered on 17 July 1717, in response to King George I's request for a concert on the River Thames.

== Structure ==
The Water Music opens with a French overture and includes minuets, bourrées, and hornpipes. It is divided into three suites:

=== Suite in F major (HWV 348) ===
I. Overture (Largo – Allegro)

II. Adagio e staccato

III. Allegro – Andante – Allegro da capo Aria

IV. Passepied

V. Air

VI. Minuet

VII & VIII. Bourrée & Hornpipe

IX. Allegro

There are nine movements:

1. Overture (Largo – Allegro)
2. Adagio e staccato
3. Allegro – Andante – Allegro da capo
4. Passepied
5. Air
6. Minuet
7. Bourrée
8. Hornpipe
9. Allegro moderato

=== Suite in D major (HWV 349) ===
I. Overture (Allegro)

II. Alla hornpipe

III. Lentement

IV. Bourrée

V. Minuet

There are five movements:

1. Overture (Allegro)
2. Alla Hornpipe
3. Lentement
4. Bourrée
5. Minuet

=== Suite in G major (HWV 350) ===
I. Sarabande

II. Rigaudon

III. Menuet

IV. Gigue

There are four movements:

1. Sarabande
2. Rigaudon
3. Menuet
4. Gigue

There is evidence for the different arrangement found in Chrysander's Gesellschaft edition of Handel's works (in volume 47, published in 1886), where the movements from the "suites" in D and G were mingled and published as one work with HWV 348. This sequence derives from Samuel Arnold's first edition of the complete score in 1788 and the manuscript copies dating from Handel's lifetime. Chrysander's edition also contains an earlier version of the first two movements of HWV 349 in the key of F major composed in 1715 (originally scored for two natural horns, two oboes, bassoon, strings, and continuo), where in addition to the horn fanfares and orchestral responses, the original version contained an elaborate concerto-like first violin part.

The music in each of the suites has no set order today.

== First performance ==
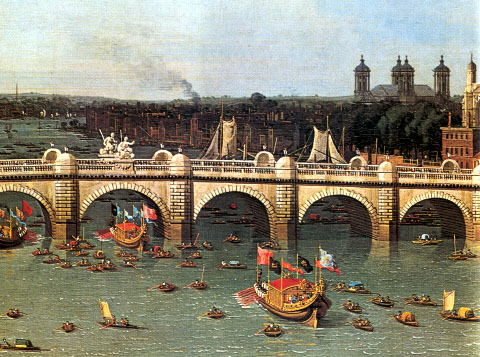
Westminster Bridge on Lord Mayor's Day by Canaletto, 1746 (detail).

The first performance of the Water Music is recorded in The Daily Courant, the first British daily newspaper. At about 8 p.m. on Wednesday, 17 July 1717, King George I and several aristocrats boarded a royal barge at Whitehall Palace, for an excursion up the Thames toward Chelsea. The rising tide propelled the barge upstream without rowing. Another barge, provided by the City of London, transported about 50 musicians who performed Handel's music. Many other Londoners also took to the river to hear the concert. According to The Courant, "the whole River in a manner was covered" with boats and barges. On arriving at Chelsea, the king left his barge, then returned to it at about 11 p.m. for the return trip. The king was so pleased with Water Music that he ordered it to be repeated at least three times, both on the trip upstream to Chelsea and on the return, until he landed again at Whitehall.

Handel's orchestra is believed to have performed from about 8 p.m. until well after midnight, with only one break while the king went ashore at Chelsea.

== Subsequent performances ==
In 1920, Hamilton Harty made an arrangement of some of the movements for the modern orchestra. Such re-orchestrations were normal at the time. According to the conductor Sir Thomas Beecham:

The original Handelian orchestra was composed of a handful of strings and about a dozen reed wind instruments, mainly oboes and bassoons, with an occasional reinforcement of horns, trumpets, and drums, restricted by necessity to the somewhat monotonous repetition of tonic and dominant. This makes hard going for any audience asked to listen to it with the opulent sound of a latter-day orchestra well in its ears.

== Recordings ==
There are many recordings. The Music for the Royal Fireworks (1749), composed 32 years later for another outdoor performance (this time, for George II of Great Britain for the fireworks in London's Green Park, on 27 April 1749), has often been paired with the Water Music on recordings.

Hamilton Harty's re-orchestration was used in some earlier recordings of the Water Music. In 1956 the conductor Charles Mackerras recorded this version, but he later changed his approach to Handel turning to the composer's original orchestration (his 1959 recording of the Music for the Royal Fireworks being seen as something of a watershed).

There is a chamber version of the score known as the Oxford Water Music. The title comes from the location of the manuscript rather than the assumed place of performance: the arrangement was possibly intended by Handel for performance at Cannons by the band of his patron the Duke of Chandos. It has been recorded on the Avie label.
