= Frans Verhas =

Belgian painter (1827–1897)

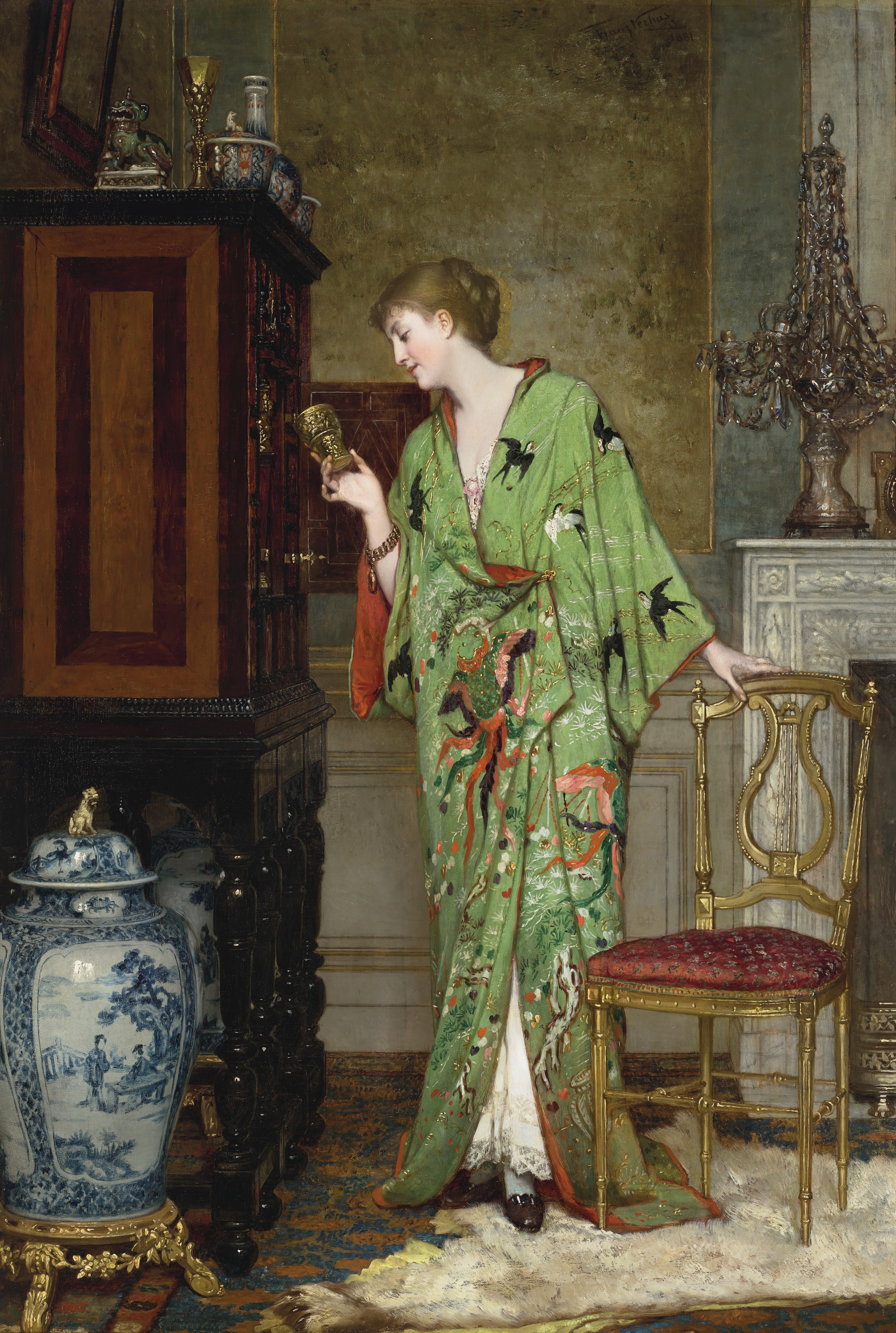
Art collector in a kimono

Frans Verhas or Franz Verhas (Dendermonde, 1827 – Schaerbeek, 1897) was a Belgian painter. He is known for his portraits and genre scenes of women and children set in luxurious bourgeois homes. His elaborate salon interiors are characterised by their rich abundance and the display of a wide range of textures, such as tapestries, satins, furs, marbles and metals. Frans Verhas also painted animals, history paintings and still lifes.

== Life ==
Frans Verhas was born in Dendermonde as the son of Emmanuel Verhas. His father was a painter who for twenty years was a teacher at the local Academy and also served as a director of that Academy. Frans received his initial art training from his father along with his younger brother Jan (or Jan Frans). His brother became a very successful artist.

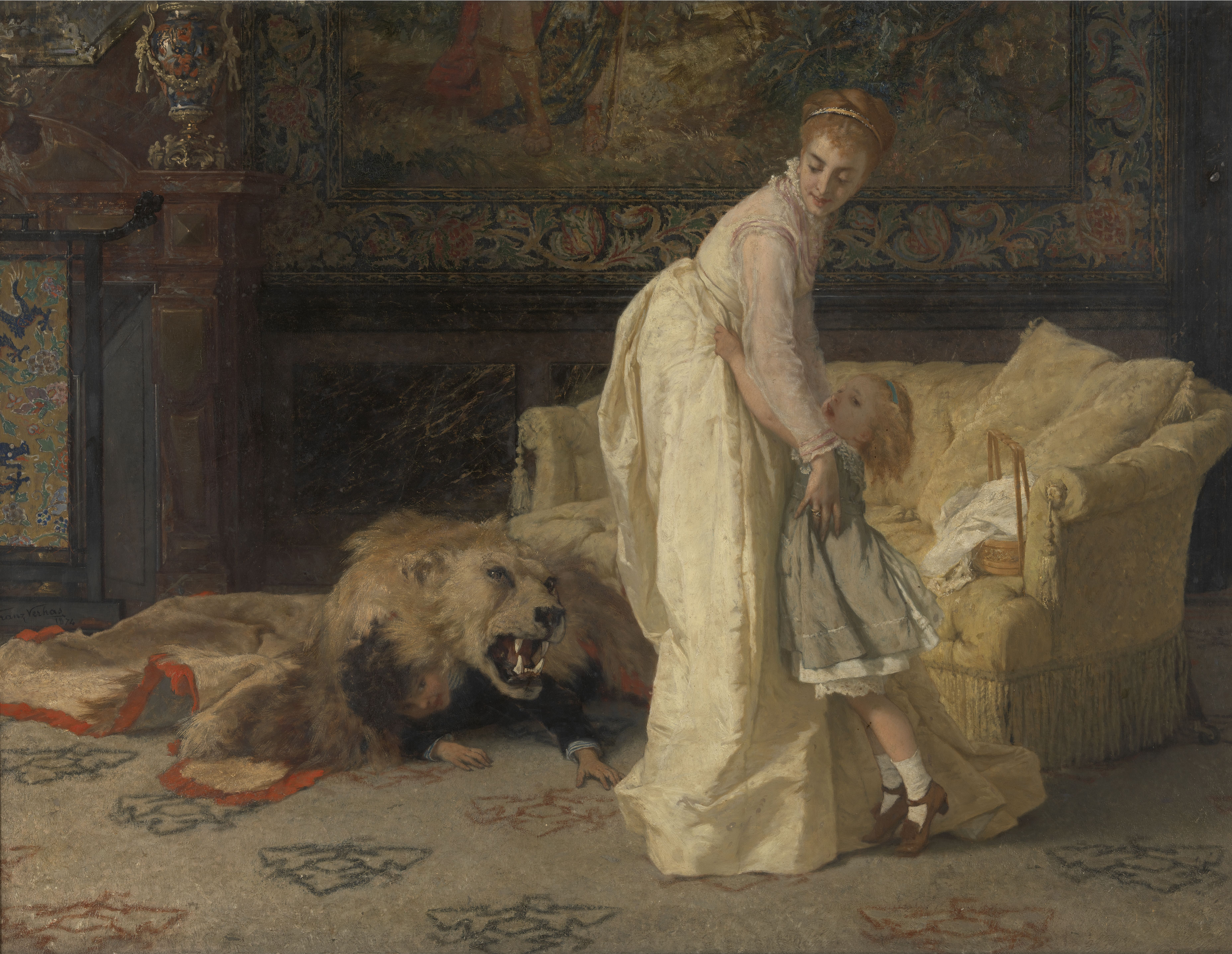
The lion

Verhas studied initially at the Academy of Fine Arts in his hometown Dendermonde and then at the Royal Academy of Fine Arts of Antwerp. One of his teachers at the Antwerp Academy was Nicaise de Keyser, a painter of mainly history paintings and portraits and one of the key figures in the Belgian Romantic-historical school of painting. Verhas settled in Schaerbeek in 1867.

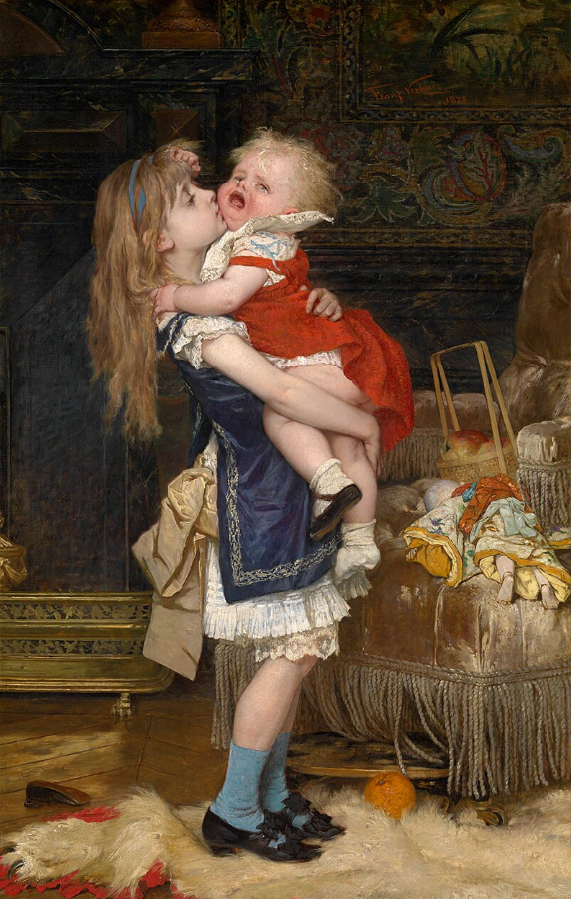
Inconsolable

Frans Verhas lived and worked for various periods in Paris in the late 1870s and during the 1880s. He was a close friend of the French writer Arsène Houssaye, for whom he executed decorative frescoes in his residence on avenue de Friedland in Paris. The decorative program consisted of pastiches of the Flemish and Venetian masters.

Frans Verhas died on 22 November 1897 in Schaerbeek.

== Work ==
Frans Verhas was known for his portraits of women and genre paintings set in luxurious bourgeois homes. He also painted animals, some history paintings and still lifes. He created a number of frescoes with history themes in residences during his stay in Paris in the 1870s and 1880s.

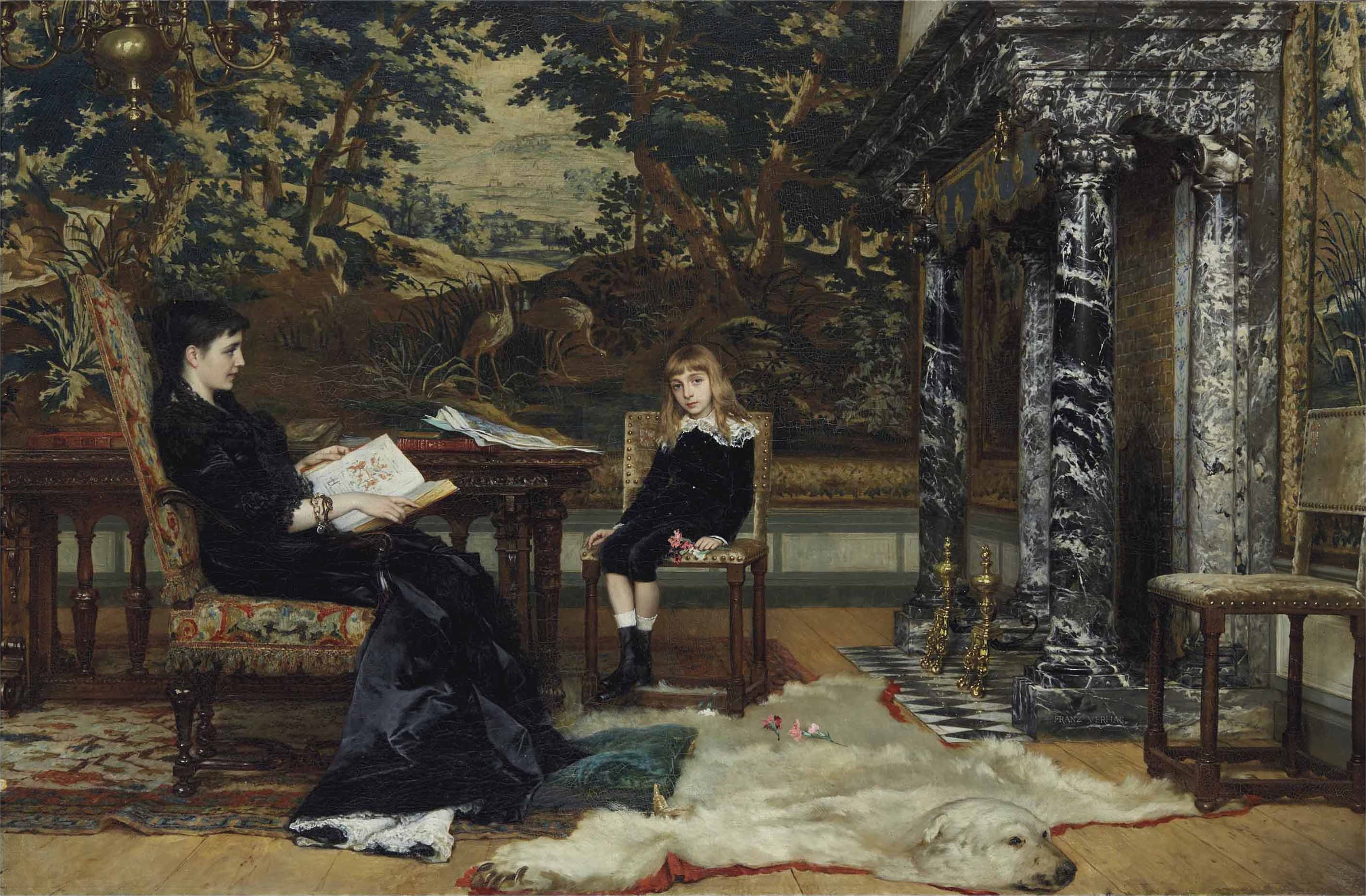
Reading in the living room

His principal subject matter and style of painting was influenced by the Belgian painter Alfred Stevens, who had made a career as a society painter of elegant women in Paris. He and his brother Jan Verhas were known for their paintings of small family scenes depicting the joyous hubbub of girls and boys with their perfect transparent and pearly skins and controlled facial expressions. Other Belgian artists who were also followers of Alfred Stevens included Gustave Léonard de Jonghe and Charles Baugniet. Like Frans Verhas they evoked the vision of women adorned and painted in a manner that accentuates their coquettishness and seductiveness, like adulated idols.

Frans Verhas' constructed compositions include rich interiors, enriched with satins and goblins, skins of animals and marbles that frame the elegant crinoline worn by the female sitters. He was particularly skilled in the rendering of the textures of various materials such as satin, marble and other precious materials in his works.

Verhas received various commissions for religious paintings for churches in his hometown Dendermonde and for historical paintings for the City hall of Dendermonde. His history paintings treat their subjects with a powerful realism.
