= Nicaise de Keyser =

Belgian painter (1813–1887)

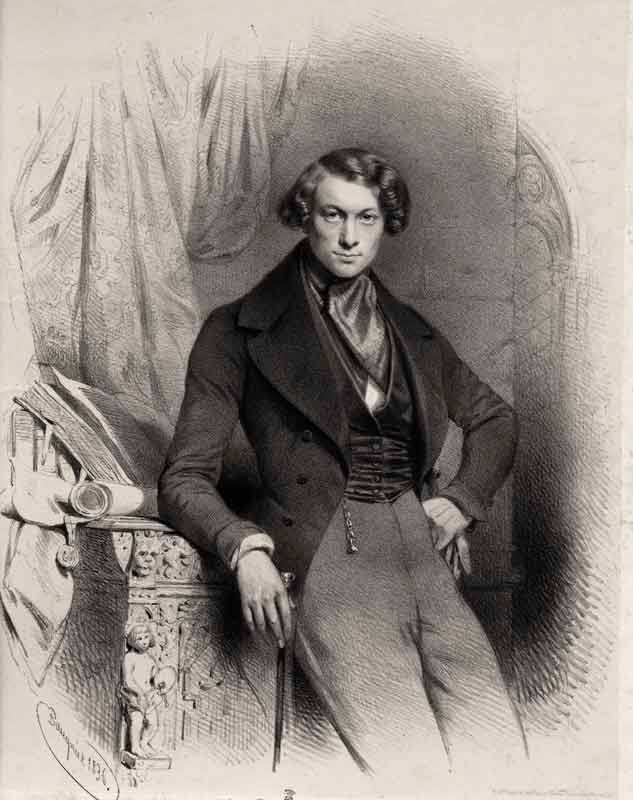
- Lithograph by Charles Baugniet, 1836
- Born: Nicaise de Keyser; 26 August 1813; Zandvliet, Belgium
- Died: 17 August 1887 (aged 73); Antwerp, Belgium
- Education: Antwerp Academy of Fine Arts
- Occupation: Painter

Nicaise de Keyser (alternative first names: Nicaas, Nikaas of Nicasius; 26 August 1813, Zandvliet – 17 July 1887, Antwerp) was a Belgian painter of mainly history paintings and portraits who was one of the key figures in the Belgian Romantic-historical school of painting.

== Biography ==
He received his painting tuition at the Antwerp Academy of Fine Arts under Jacob Jacobs and Mattheus Ignatius van Bree. After 1835 he made many travels including to England and Scotland, Paris and Italy. He married the genre painter Isabella Telghuys on 6 October 1840. In 1846, he was elected to the National Academy of Design as an Honorary Academician.

When in 1855 the leading Belgian Romantic painter Gustave Wappers resigned as director of the Antwerp Academy, de Keyser succeeded him. As with the work of other Belgian history painters such as Edouard de Bièfve, Ernest Slingeneyer and Louis Gallait, there was particular appreciation for Nicaise de Keyser's history paintings in German-speaking Europe. De Keyser regularly travelled to Germany and in 1873 he was awarded the famous Prussian order "Pour le Mérite".

Despite his great success and fame throughout his lifetime, his work, like that of the other Belgian Romantic painters, was quickly forgotten in the 20th century.

He had many students, including Léon Abry, Aloïs Boudry, Edgard Farasyn, Godfried Guffens, Edouard Hamman, Joseph Lies, George du Maurier, Karel Ooms, Ferdinand Pauwels, Edward Portielje, Jan Swerts, Eliza Turck, Alexis Van Hamme, Jan Verhas, Frans Verhas and Charles Verlat.

== Work ==
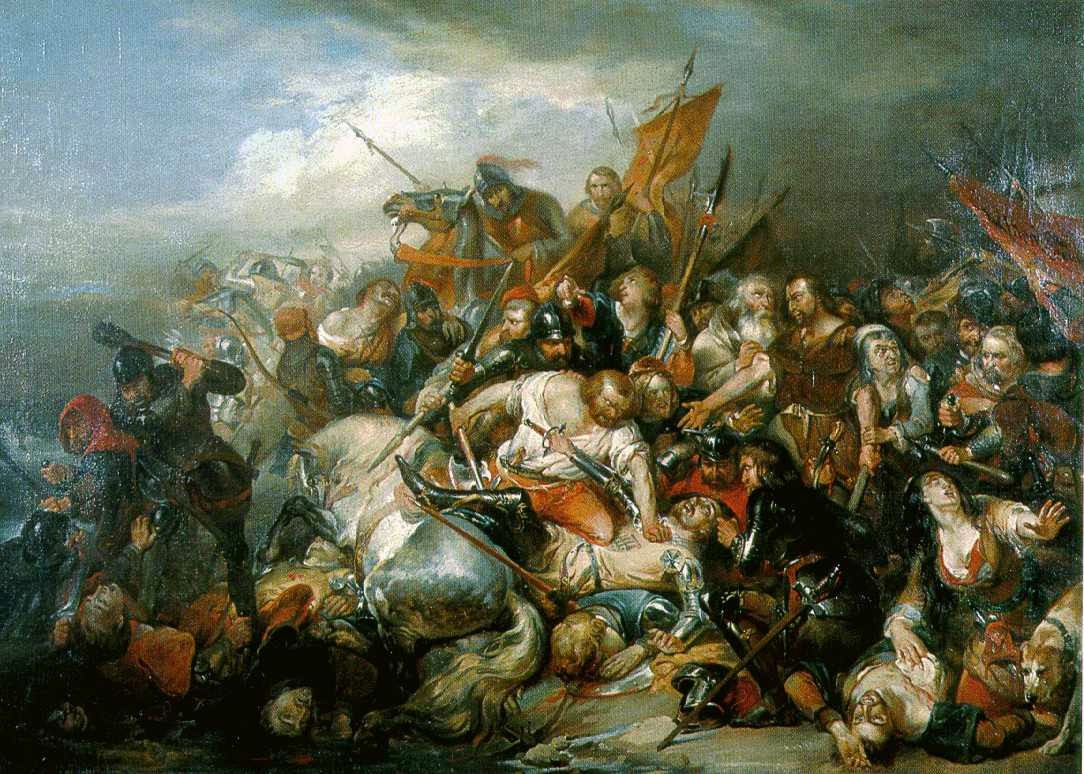
Battle of the Golden Spurs (1836)

De Keyser was an extremely prolific painter and is said to have produced more than 350 paintings. Having debuted with religious pictures, his attention was later drawn to his country's history. His breakthrough as a painter came with the canvas Battle of the Golden Spurs, which was exhibited at the Brussels Salon in 1836. It depicts a scene from an important historical battle between France and Flanders of 1302. Seeing the painting is said to have inspired the Belgian writer Hendrik Conscience to write his book "De Leeuw van Vlaanderen" (The Lion of Flanders) about the Flemish battle for independence from the French. The success of de Keyser's work was followed by his less impressive work, the Battle of Worringen of 1288. Starting in 1862, de Keyser painted a series of decorative historical paintings that celebrated the Flemish school of art. The paintings were intended for the former Antwerp museum and academy building. When the new Royal Museum of Fine Arts in Antwerp was completed in the late nineteenth century, the paintings were transferred to the staircase of the museum.

De Keyser belonged to the first wave of Belgian Romantic painters who had typically studied or spent time in Paris where they had come into contact with the new Romantic movement. Others in this group included Gustave Wappers, Louis Gallait, Ernest Slingeneyer, Edouard de Bièfve and other minor figures. They chose as the subject matter of their work important historical events in Belgium's history which were regarded as key to the country's national identity. Unlike their French models such as Delacroix, their work, though colourful, lacked true Romantic zest and became popular with the artistic establishment which rewarded the artists with numerous commissions. Despite the Romantic subject matter and the Baroque compositional techniques of his historical and genre paintings, the finishing of de Keyser's paintings is in academic style, with the use of sharp lines and clearly drawn details.

De Keyser also painted genre paintings and elegantly refined portraits.

== Honours ==
- 1845 : Member of the Royal Academy of Science, Letters and Fine Arts of Belgium.
- 1849 : Member of the Prussian Academy of Arts.
- 1862 : Officer in the Legion of Honour.
- 1873 : Pour le Mérite
- 1874 : President of the Royal Academy of Science, Letters and Fine Arts of Belgium.
- 1881 : Grand Officer in the Order of Leopold, by Royal Order of 4 mai 1881.

== Selected works ==
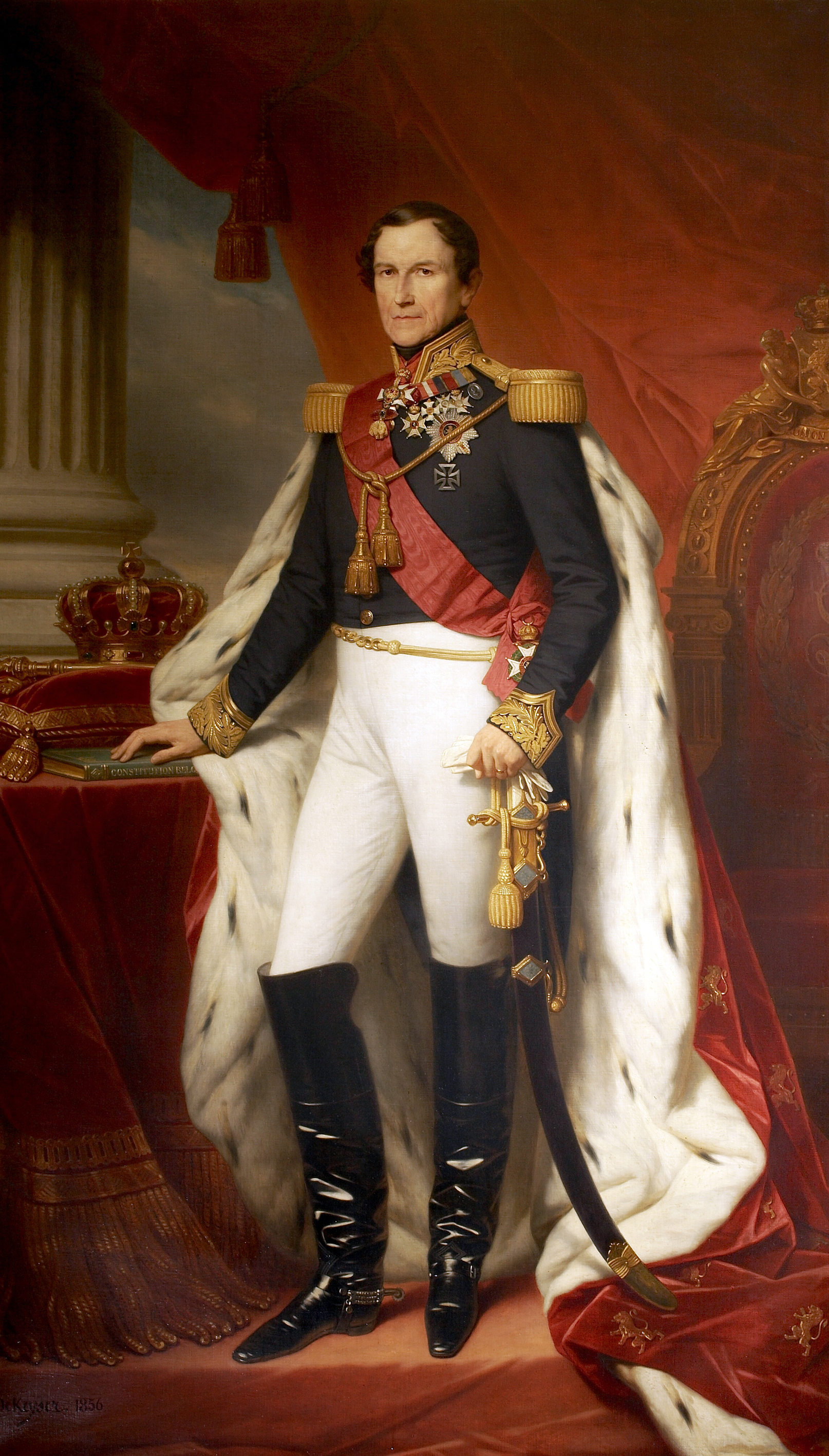
Leopold I of Belgium

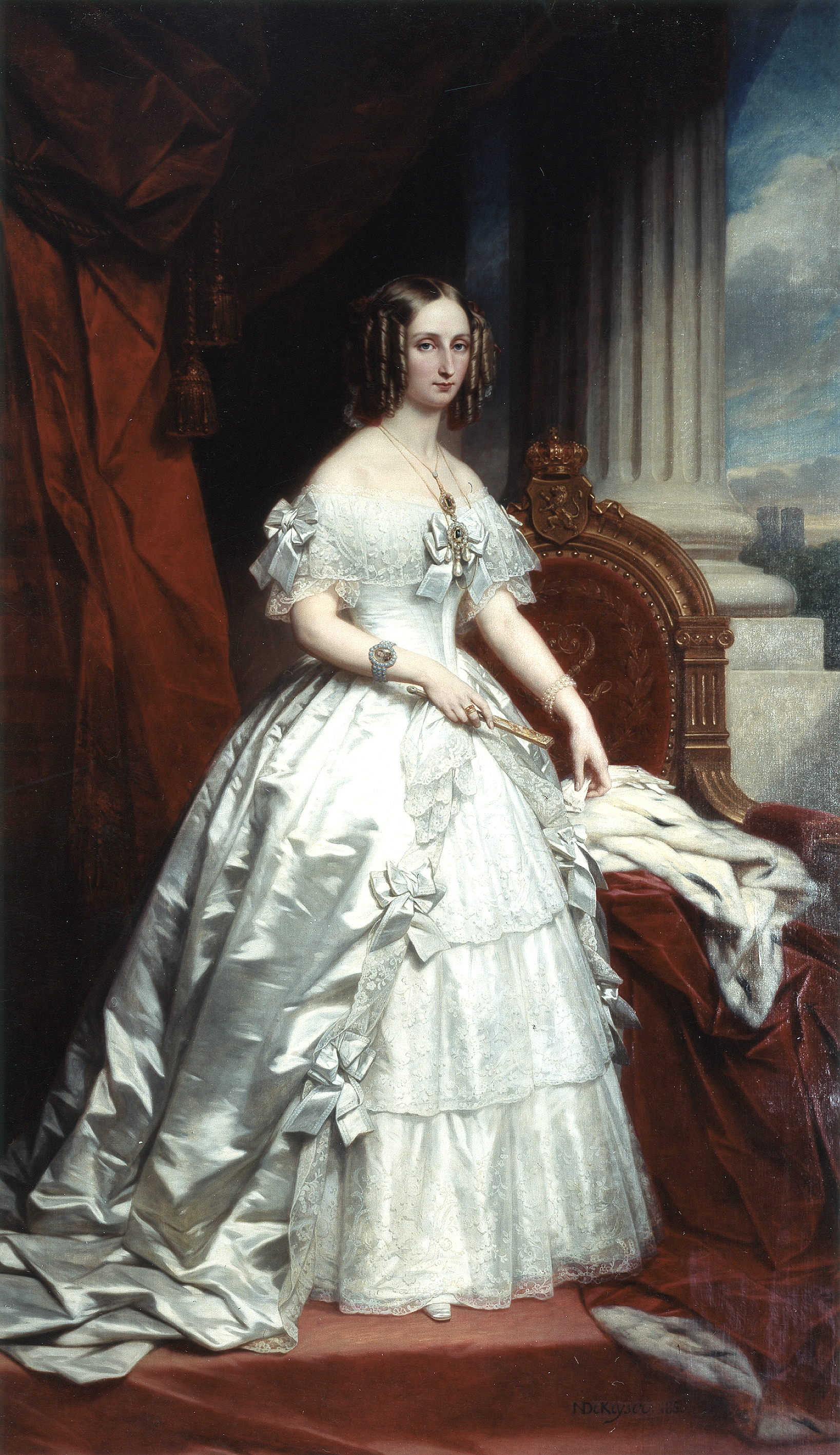
Louise d'Orléans, Queen of the Belgians

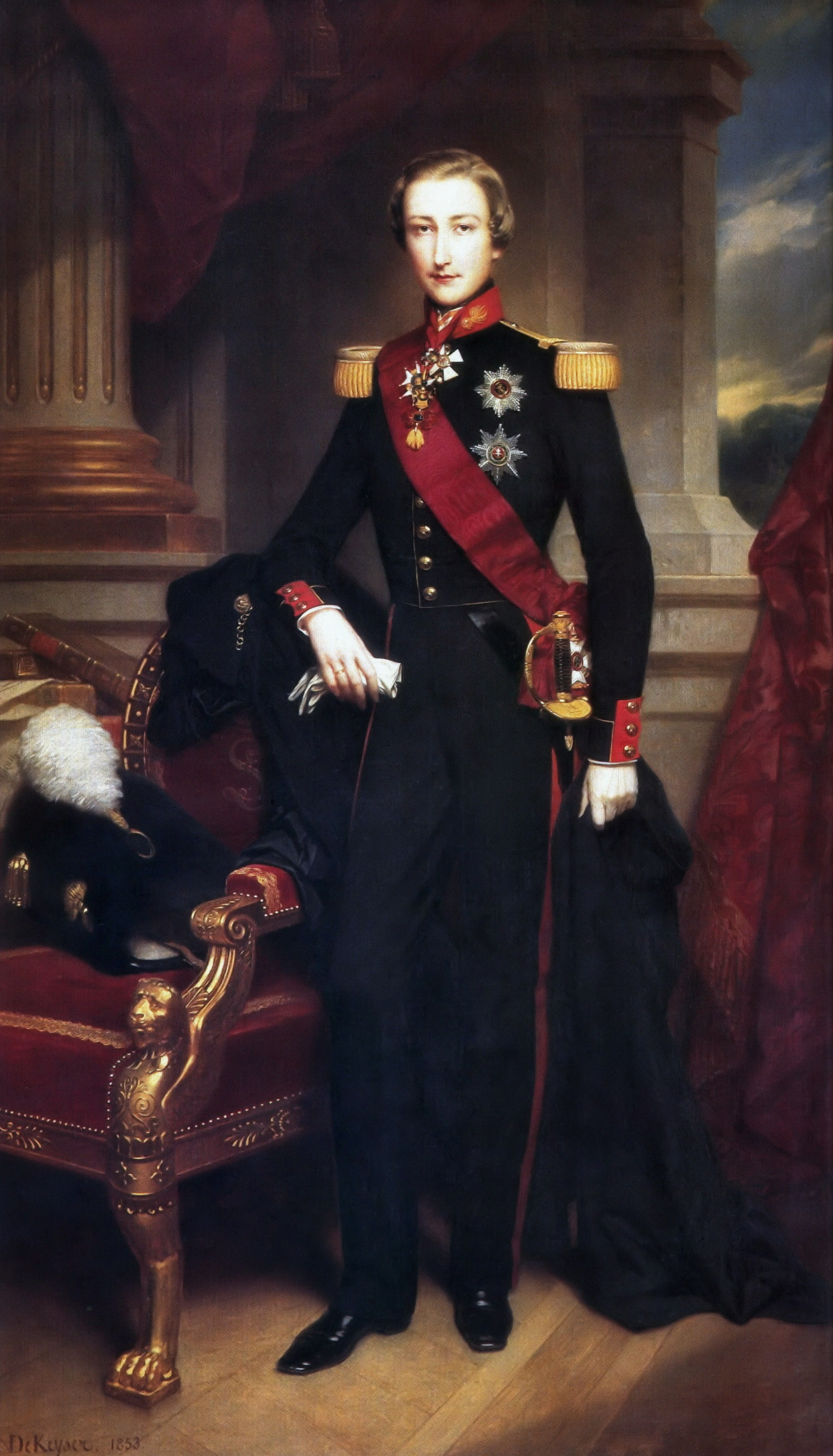
Leopold II of Belgium

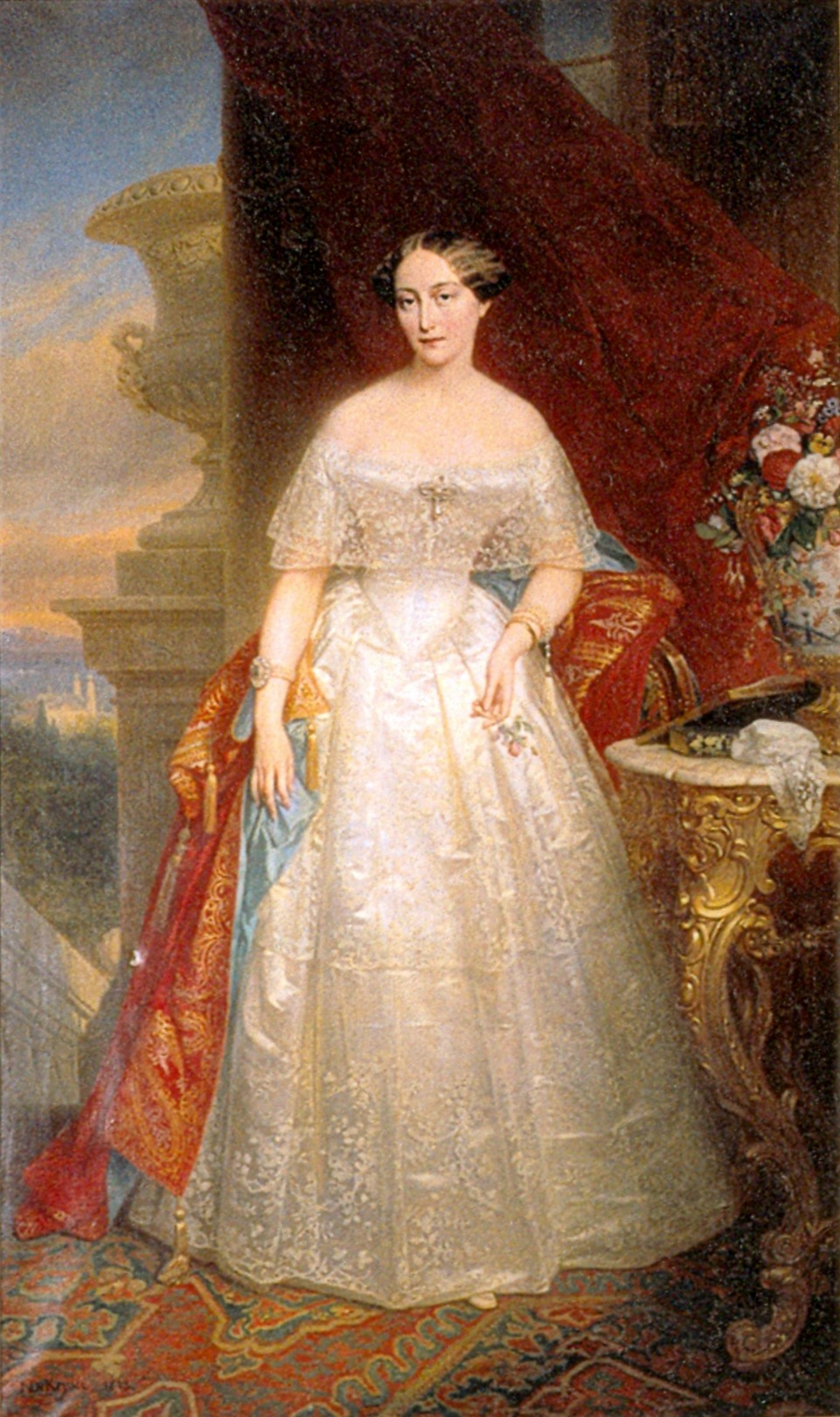
Queen Olga of Württemberg, 1848

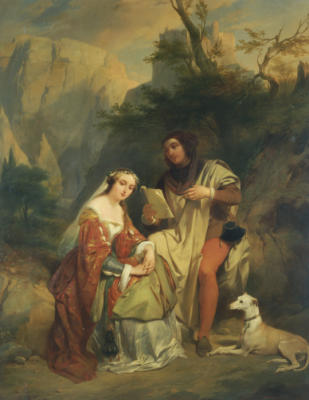
Petrarch and Laura

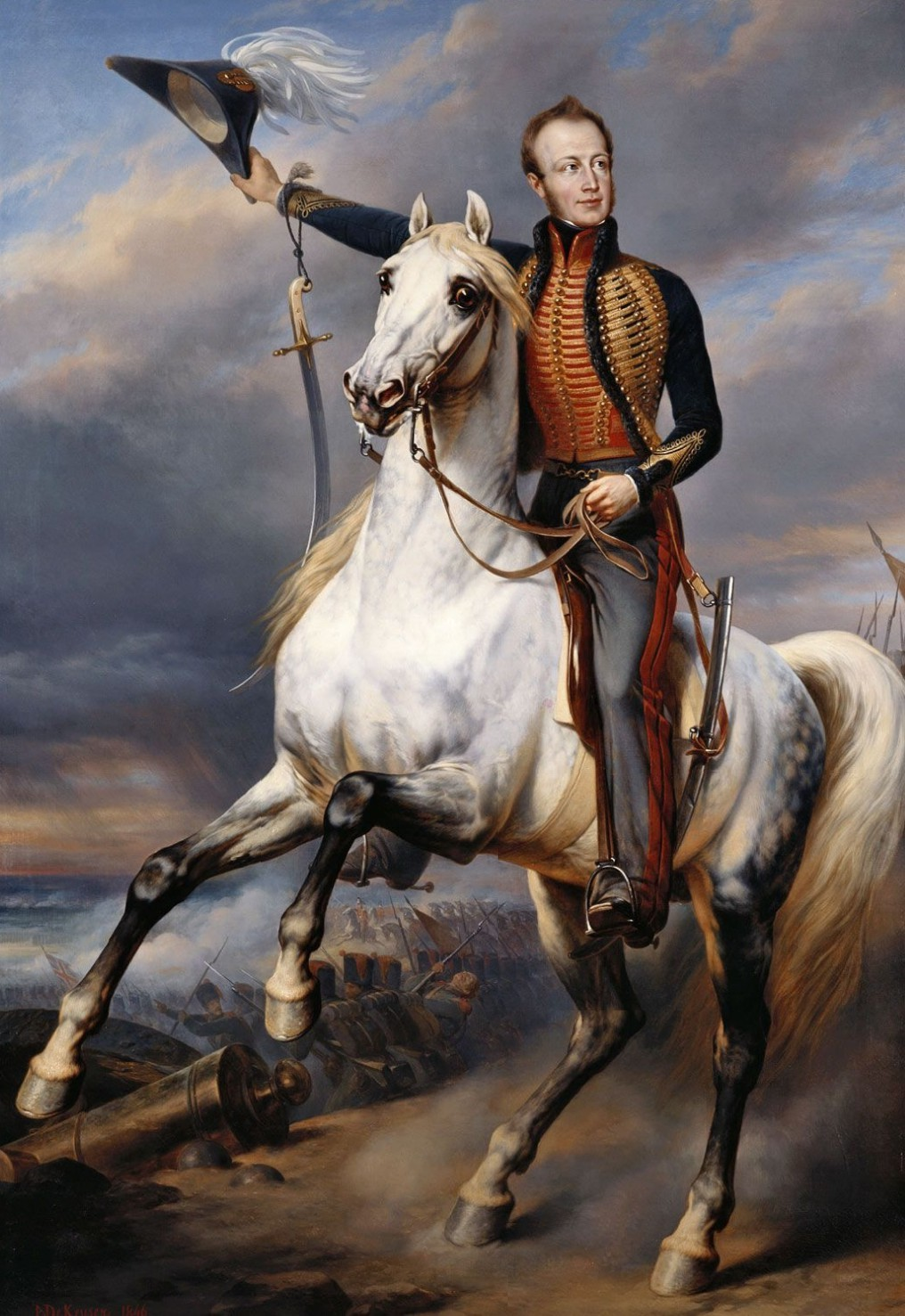
William II, King of the Netherlands

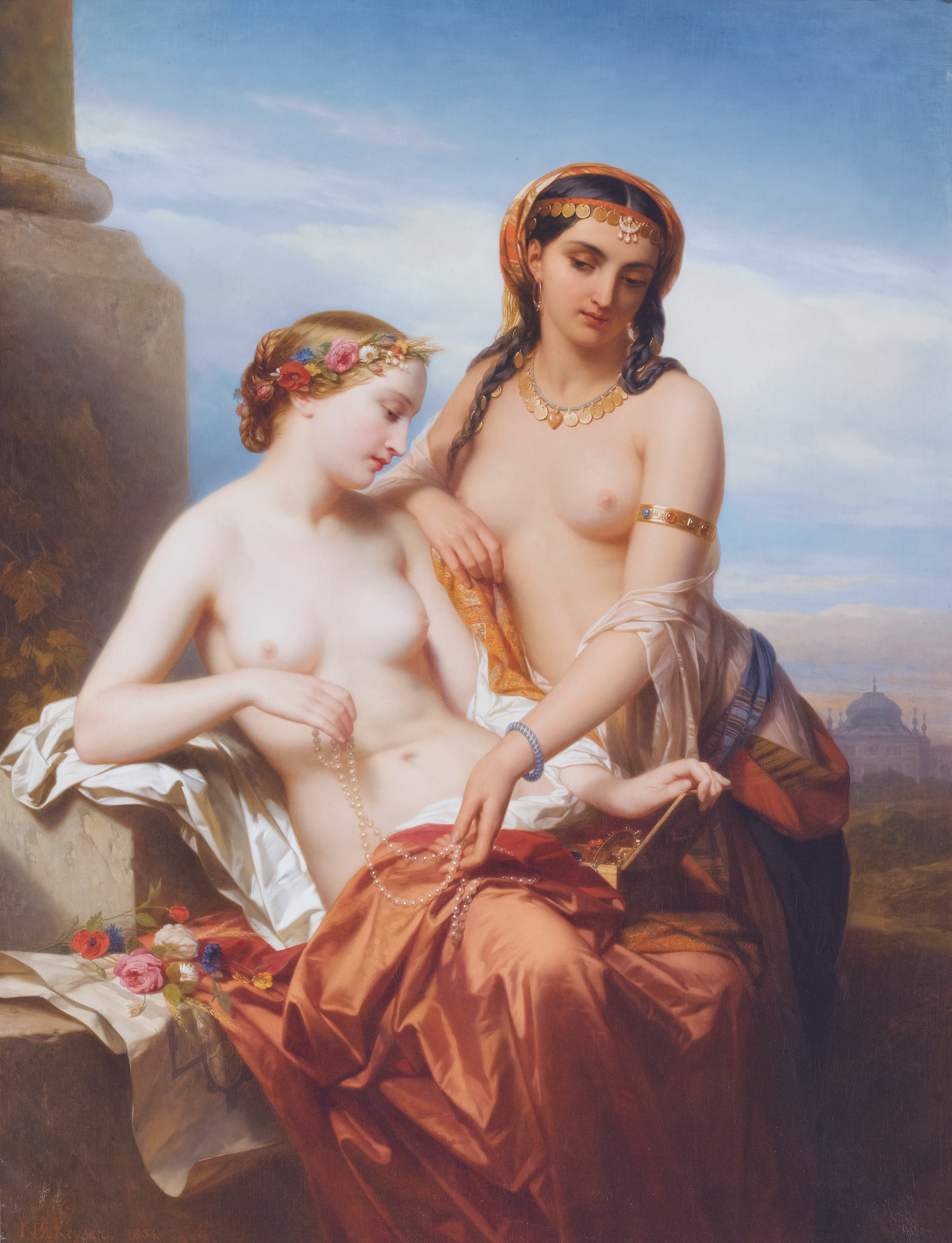
The Orient and the Occident

== Bibliography ==
- Hymans, Notice sur la vie et les travaux de N. de Keyser, Brussels, 1889.
- Laurent Stevens, "Bravo Toro: souvenir d'une course de taureaux à Madrid: La peinture tauromachique de Nicaise de Keyser", Annales d'histoire de l'art et d'archéologie (Université libre de Bruxelles), vol.32, 2010, pp. 93–112.
