= Edouard Hamman =

Belgian painter and engraver (1819–1888)

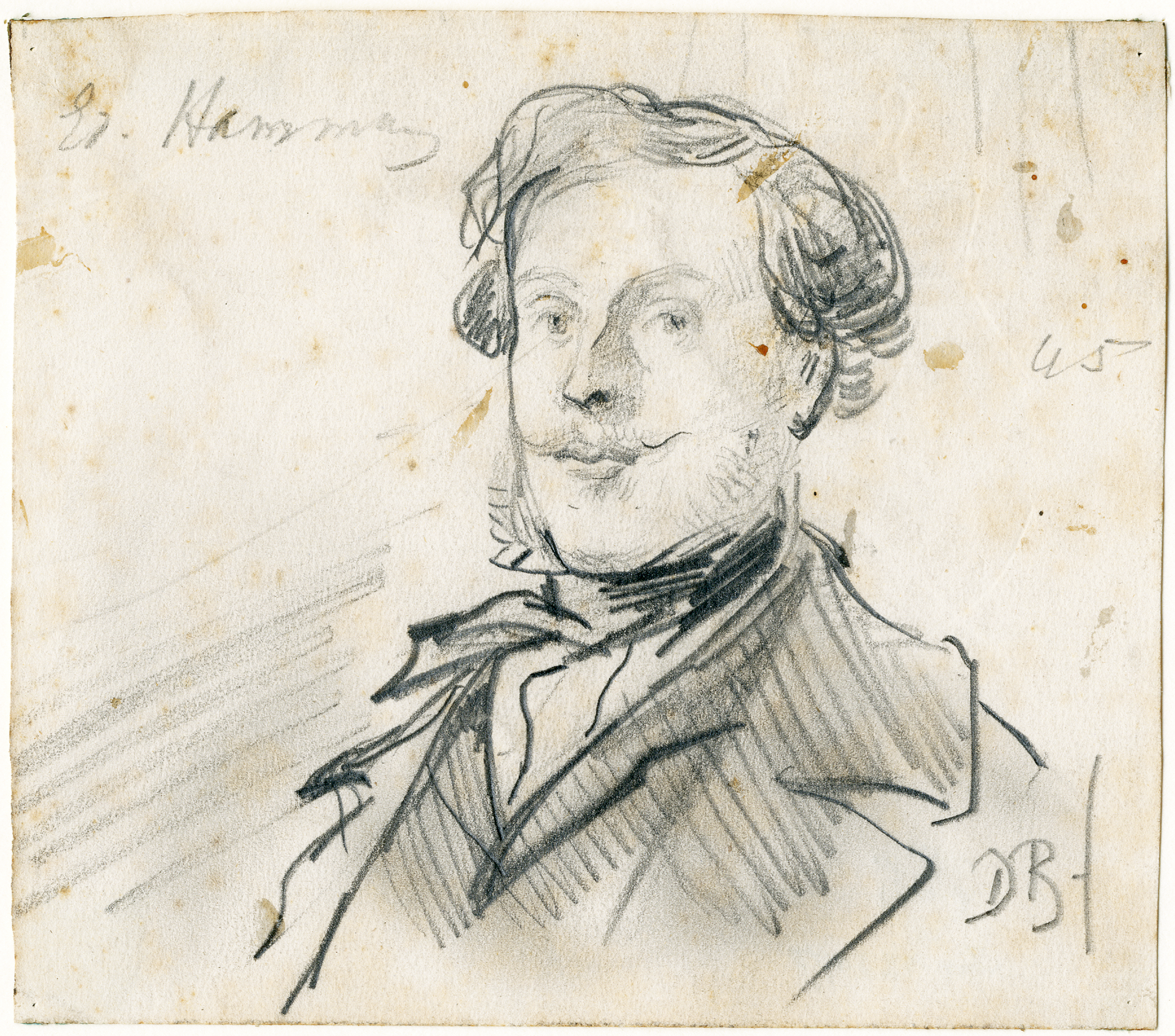
- Portrait of Hamman by David Bles
- Born: Edouard Jean Conrad Hamman; 24 September 1819; Ostend, Belgium
- Died: 30 March 1888 (aged 68); Paris, France
- Education: Royal Academy of Fine Arts of Antwerp
- Known for: Painting

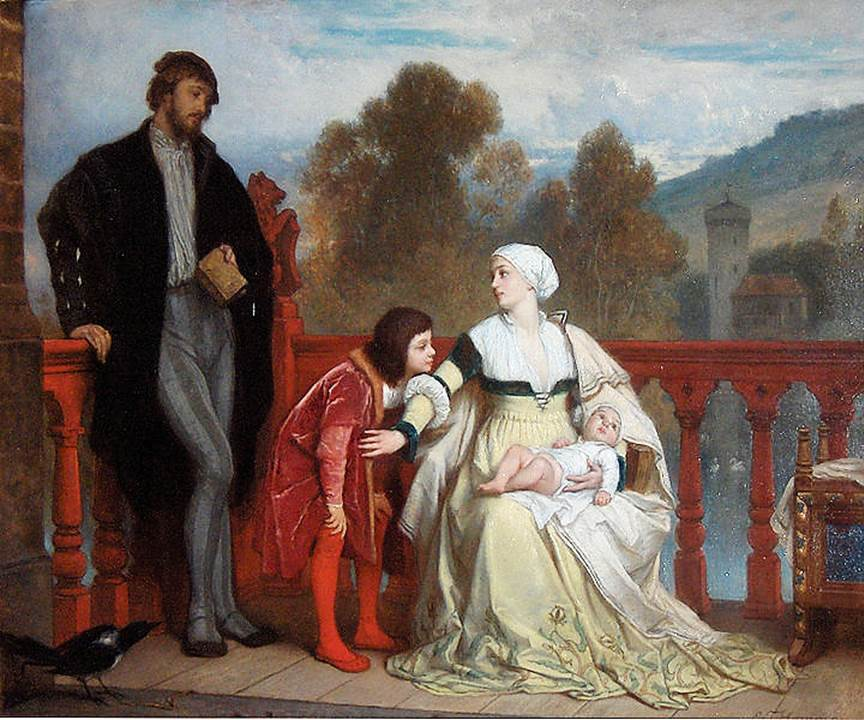
The Newborn: Edouard Hamman and his family in historical costumes

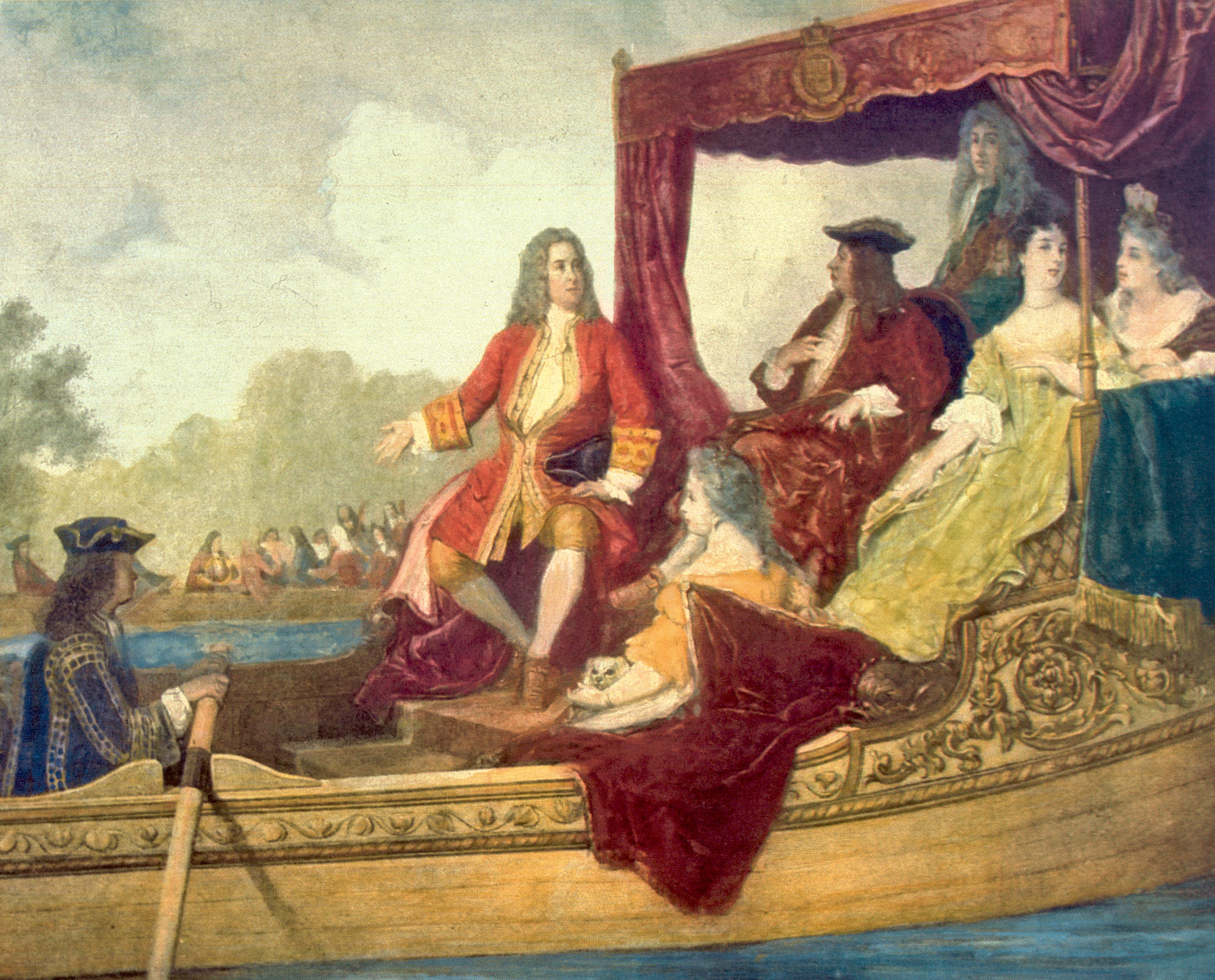
King George I and Georg Frideric Handel at the first performance of his Water Music

Edouard Jean Conrad Hamman (24 September 1819 – 30 March 1888) was a Belgian painter and engraver who specialized in portraying scenes from the lives of famous artists, scholars and the nobility.

== Life and work ==
Hamman was born on 24 September 1819, in Ostend. His father was the Town Receiver and secretary of the Chamber of Commerce in Ostend and created a fund for the benefit of needy fishermen and their families. Little is known of this period in his life, but he apparently became a student of François-Antoine Bossuet at an early age. In the school-year 1837/38, he was enrolled at the Royal Academy of Fine Arts of Antwerp. He was also a private student in the studio of Nicaise de Keyser. It is believed that he was a student of Hendrik Leys, although Leys had no students, properly speaking.

He had his formal debut at the Ghent Salon of 1838 with an unspecified "interior scene". His exposure to other artists there led to him being influenced by the style of Louis Gallait. His first success was at the Brussels Salon of 1842, which was followed by a commission to paint a mural, The Triumphant Entry of the Archduke Albert and Isabella to Ostend in 1604, for the Town Hall. Unfortunately, the mural was destroyed during World War II. At this time he also did several illustrations for books by the publishing firm of J. E. Buschmann.

In 1846, he moved to Paris for further studies at the Ecole des Beaux-Arts, where he was attracted to the works of Joseph-Nicolas Robert-Fleury and Thomas Couture. In 1849 he made the traditional study trip to Italy. He eventually achieved great fame in France. Napoleon III and the Empress Eugénie were fond of his work and in 1863 the French government bought his painting Education of Charles V for 4,000 francs. Among his other notable works from this period are six paintings of Italian history, commissioned by Victor Emmanuel II, and the series "Celebrated Composers", reproductions from which are still in use.

In later years he turned more to genre painting and portraits, including one of King Norodom of Cambodia, which brought him great distinction in that country. His son, Édouard Michel Ferdinand Hamman (1854–1952) became a landscape painter of some note.

== Honours ==
1885: Officer in the Order of Leopold.
