= Karel Ooms =

Belgian painter (1845–1900)

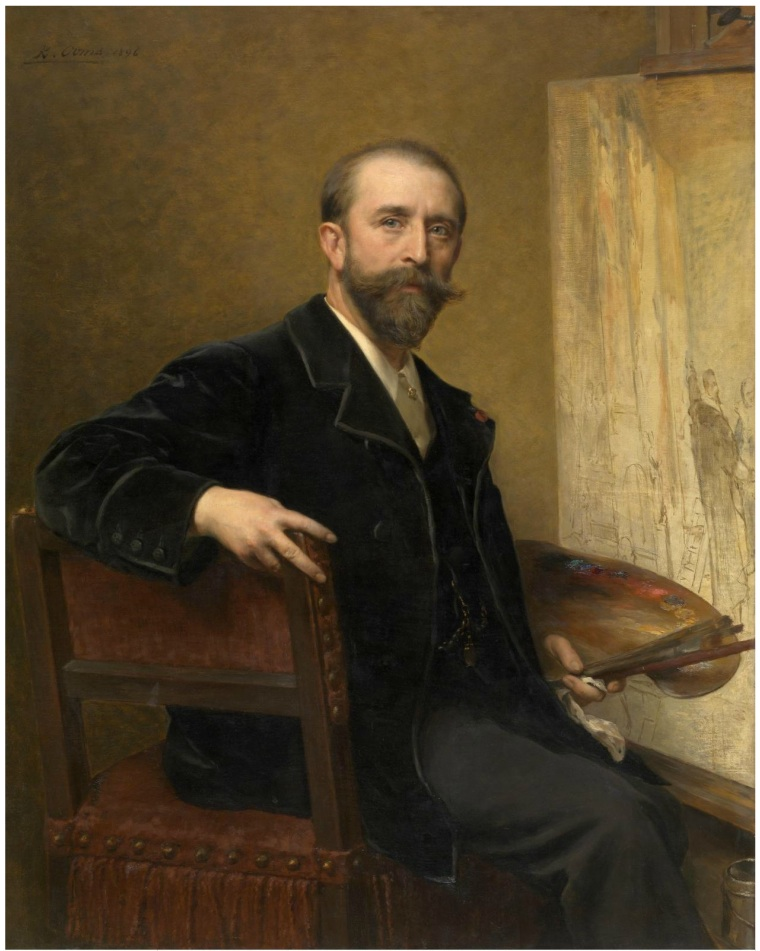
- Karel Ooms, Self-portrait
- Born: 27 January 1845; Dessel, Belgium
- Died: 18 March 1900 (aged 55); Cannes, France
- Education: Royal Academy of Fine Arts (Antwerp)
- Known for: Painter, draughtsman, sculptor and print-maker
- Movement: Orientalist
- Spouse: Baroness Edith van Eersel

Karel Ooms (27 January 1845 — 18 March 1900) was a Belgian painter of portraits, genre paintings and history paintings. He was also known for his Orientalist scenes and Oriental landscapes.

== Life ==
Karel Ooms was born in Dessel as the youngest son of a large peasant family. At school his extraordinary talent for drawing was discovered. When he was twelve his hometown provided financial support which allowed him to study at the Antwerp Academy of Fine Arts.

One of his teachers at the Academy was Nicaise de Keyser, one of the key figures in the Belgian Romantic-historical school of painting and a painter of mainly history paintings and portraits. After graduating from the Academy 1865 Karel Ooms was welcomed with pomp in his home town Dessel. He painted two altarpieces for the local church Saint Nicolas, to express his gratitude to his city.

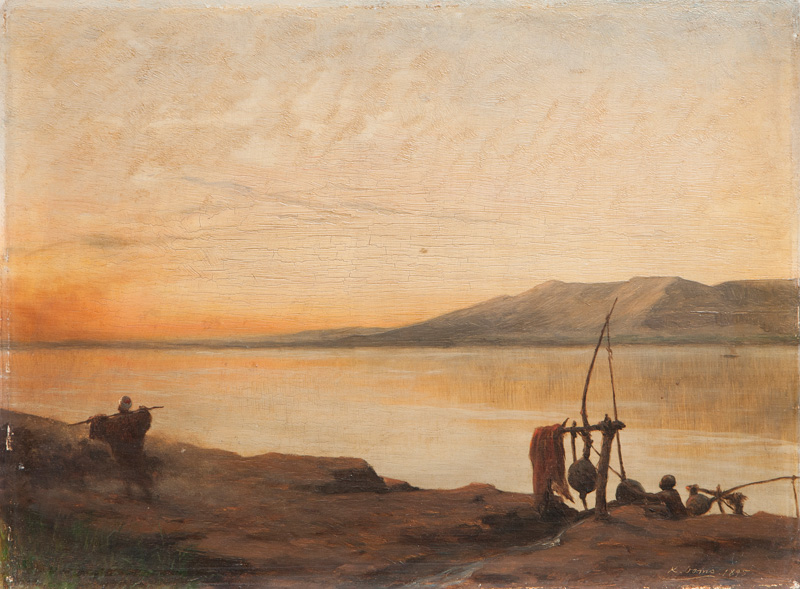
By the Nile (between 1865 and 1900)

Karel Ooms settled as an independent artist in Antwerp around 1871. He quickly established a reputation as a portrait painter. In addition, he received commissions for religious paintings and history paintings. He gained particular recognition with two large paintings, which he made for the criminal courtroom of the Antwerp Courthouse. His renown extended across the borders as Karel Ooms won awards for his oeuvre in Prague (1877), Amsterdam (1883), Adelaide (1887), Melbourne (1888), and Chicago (1893).

Karel Ooms made many travels in Europe and the Middle East. His travels to Palestine and Egypt are documented through the landscape paintings he made on location. In the Middle East, he found abundant inspiration for his Orientalist paintings.

Late in life, in 1897, he married Baroness Edith van Eersel, widow of Baron Emile della Faille, a member of a prominent Belgian aristocratic family. His wife was well-off and an avid art lover and collector. Soon after their marriage, the couple went to live in Edith's villa in Cannes so that Ooms, who suffered from a heart condition, could spend the winter months in a milder climate. However, he died at the age of 55 in Cannes as a result of stress following a nighttime break-in into his Cannes home. His remains were transferred to Antwerp and interred at the Moretus cemetery in Wilrijk.

== Work ==
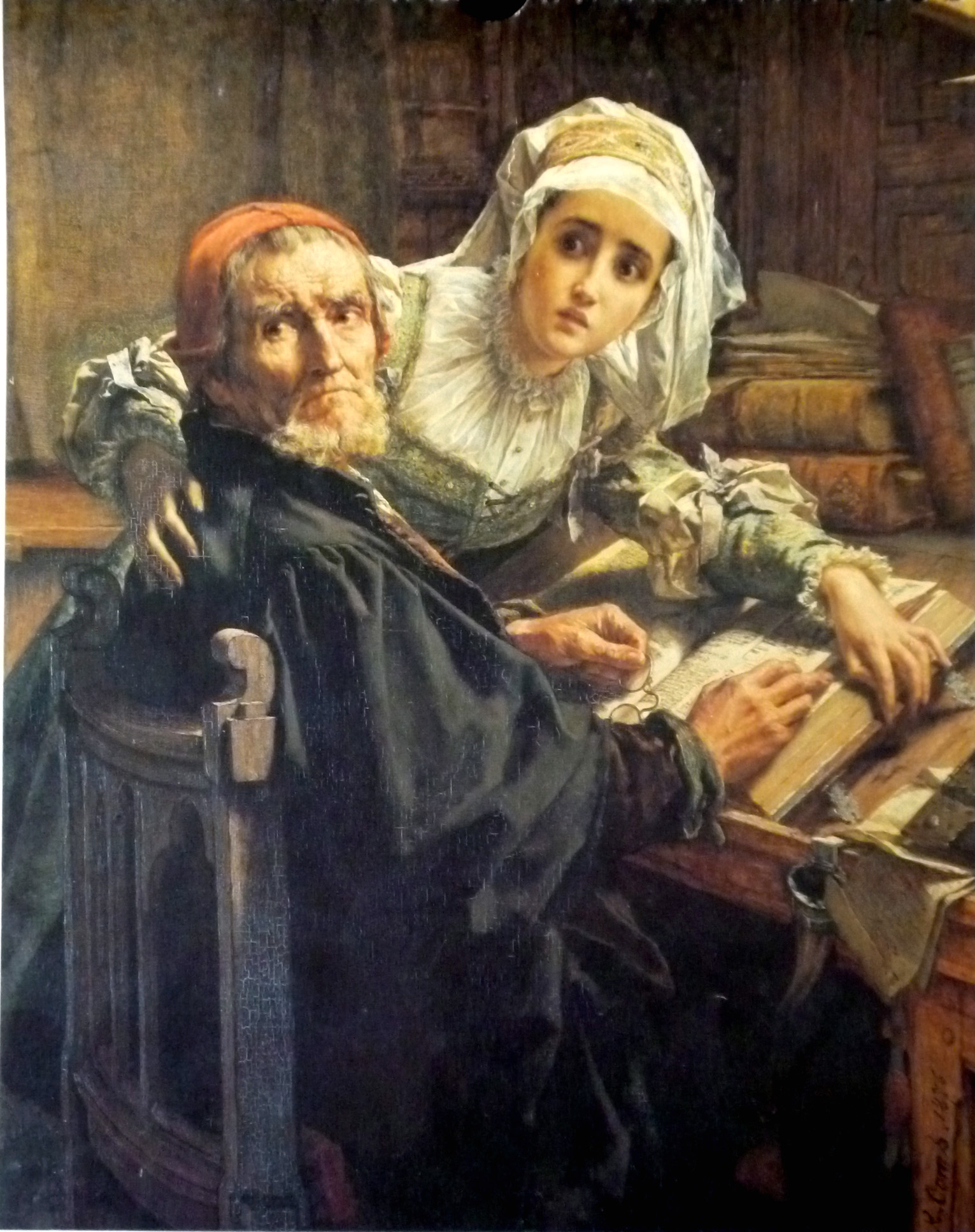
The prohibited reading (1876)

Karel Ooms worked in various genres including portrait painting, history painting, landscape painting and genre painting. He is now mainly known for his Orientalist and genre paintings and portraits.

Portraits make up about one third of Ooms' known output of 220 works. The sitters for his portraits were mainly from the wealthy bourgeoisie in Antwerp and the Campine. His self-portrait of 1896 depicts the artist holding his palette. The colours on the palette show his preference for earthy pigments, which was typical for artists like him who worked in the academic tradition.

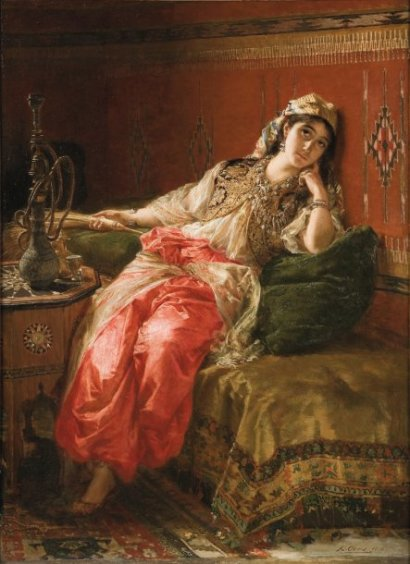
Dreaming in the harem (1880)

His career received a boost from the success of his 1876 history/genre painting entitled The prohibited reading (Royal Museums of Fine Arts of Belgium). This painting depicts a historical scene of an old man and a young woman who are huddled over a bible. The pair is gazing in apparent concern or alarm, over the old man's shoulder, towards something outside of the picture. The scene is likely set in the 16th or 17th century when Protestants were prosecuted, amongst others, for reading the bible in the vernacular, a practice prohibited by the Catholic Church at the time. One of the reasons of the success of Ooms' picture was that the situation of the small minority of Protestants in Catholic Belgium of the late 19th century was seen as having parallels with their situation in the 16th century. The painting was immediately acquired by the Belgian state. In 1885, Ooms made a reduced copy of the work, probably for his own use. The composition was also copied by other painters, for display in Protestant religious venues and homes. It was also circulated through prints. The composition shows Ooms' principal interest in portrait painting as the faces of the two figures are in the centre of the composition and are clearly painted in more vivid colours and detail. A painting with a similar theme of religious persecution is The Jews in the Middle Ages (1890, Royal Museum of Fine Arts Antwerp), which deals with the persecution of Jews.

Ooms painted many more history paintings which showed his interest in the 16th century history of his country.

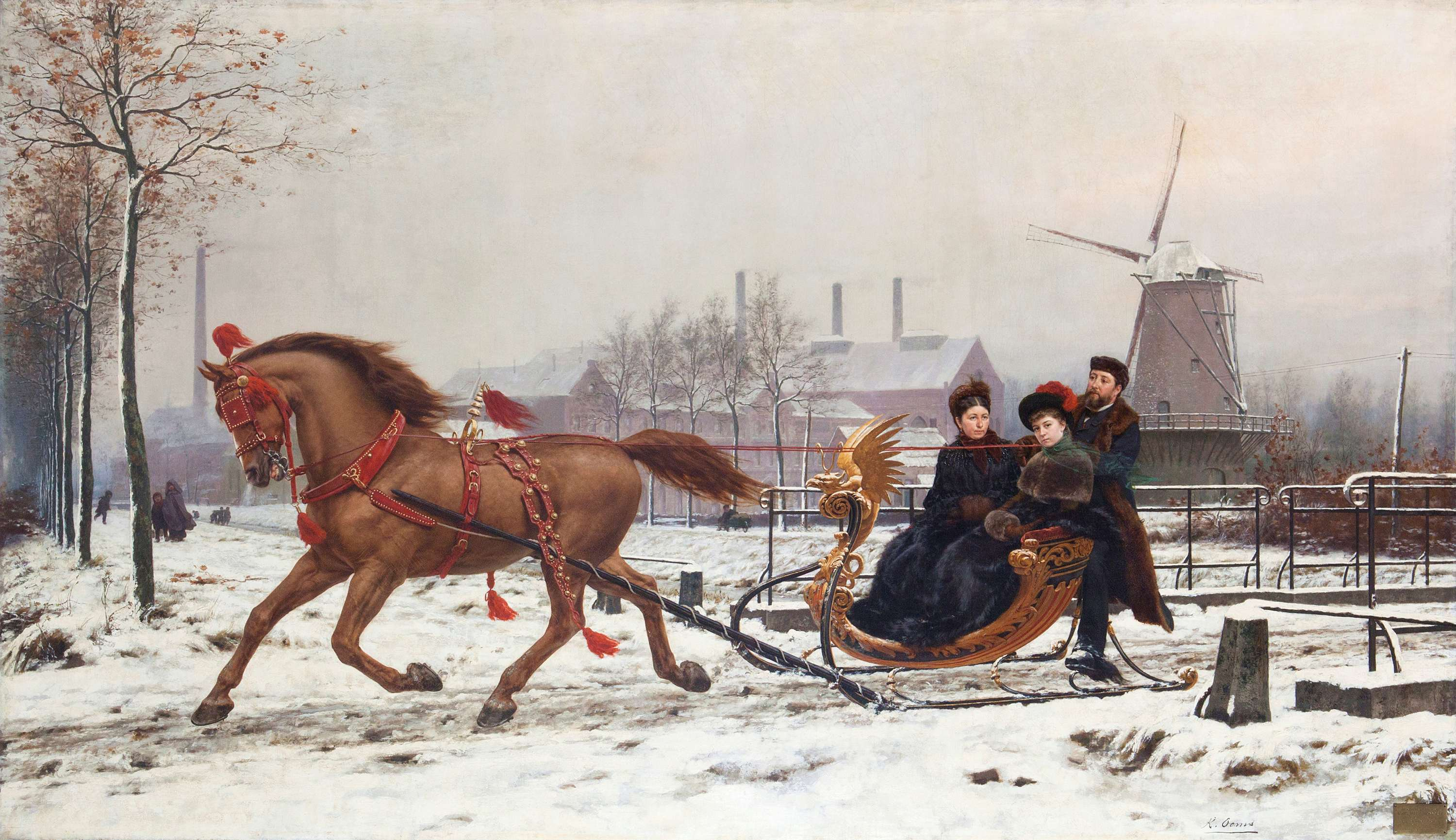
Aristocratic family enjoying winter (1885)

Inspired by his travels in the Middle East, Karel Ooms painted many Orientalist compositions. A portion of these are landscapes he painted on site. These include works such as By the Nile and View of Jericho. Others depict dancers and public festivities. Karel Ooms further painted a few works such as Dreaming in the harem, which reflected the contemporary interest in the theme of the harem and the odalisque in Orientalism. One of his Orientalist works – a portrait of an Egyptian woman entitled The woman of Cairo – is part of the Shafik Gabr Collection in Cairo.

Karel Ooms painted many genre scenes, some of which doubled as family portraits. An example is the Aristocratic family enjoying winter, which was commissioned by the Belgian aristocratic family "Meeùs-Honnorez" in 1885. It shows the three family members riding a horse-drawn sleigh, with the local distillery in the background, which the family owned and which was a major source of the family's wealth. They are in elegant dress and royal poses and bring to mind similar portraits of the Russian Czar Romanov family.

== See also ==
- List of Orientalist artists
