= Ferdinand de Braekeleer the Elder =

Flemish painter

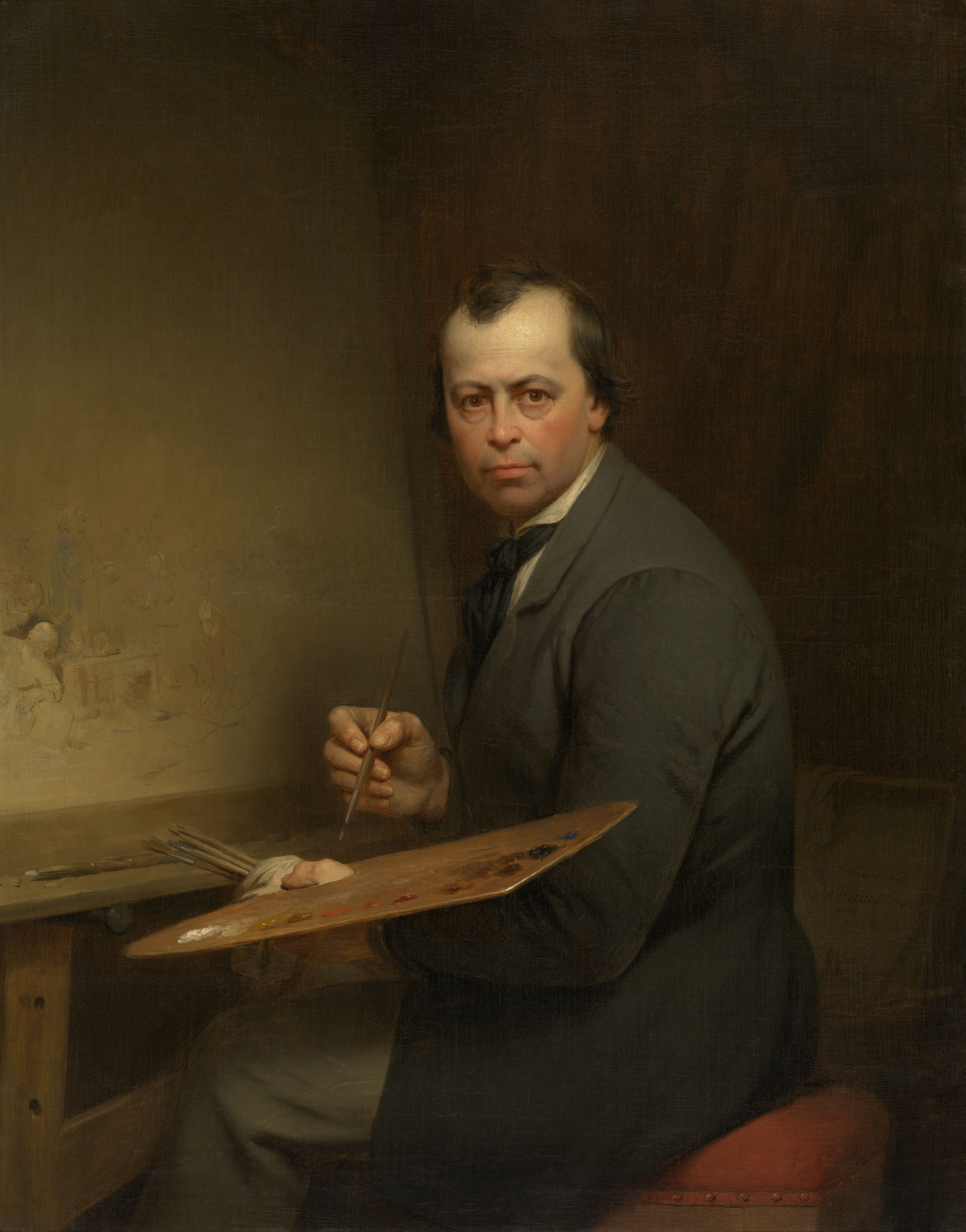
Self-portrait (1854)

Ferdinand de Braekeleer (12 February 1792 – 16 May 1883), sometimes spelled as Ferdinand de Braeckeleer, was a Flemish painter and printmaker. He is known for his paintings of genre scenes, church interiors, historic events, religious scenes, cityscapes, market scenes and market still lifes. He is called 'the Elder' to distinguish him from his son with the same name, who was also a painter.

== Life ==
Ferdinand de Braekeleer was born in Antwerp on 12 February 1792, into a poor family. After his parents died, he was admitted to the school for orphans and children of poor parents established by the prominent Antwerp painter Mattheus Ignatius van Bree in Antwerp in 1807. At the school, de Brakeleer received artistic training as well as reading classes. De Bree rewarded good students with money and gifts. De Brakeleer was a good pupil and continued his education at the Royal Academy for Fine Arts of Antwerp where van Bree was also a teacher. He excelled as a pupil and received several prizes in 1809 and 1811.

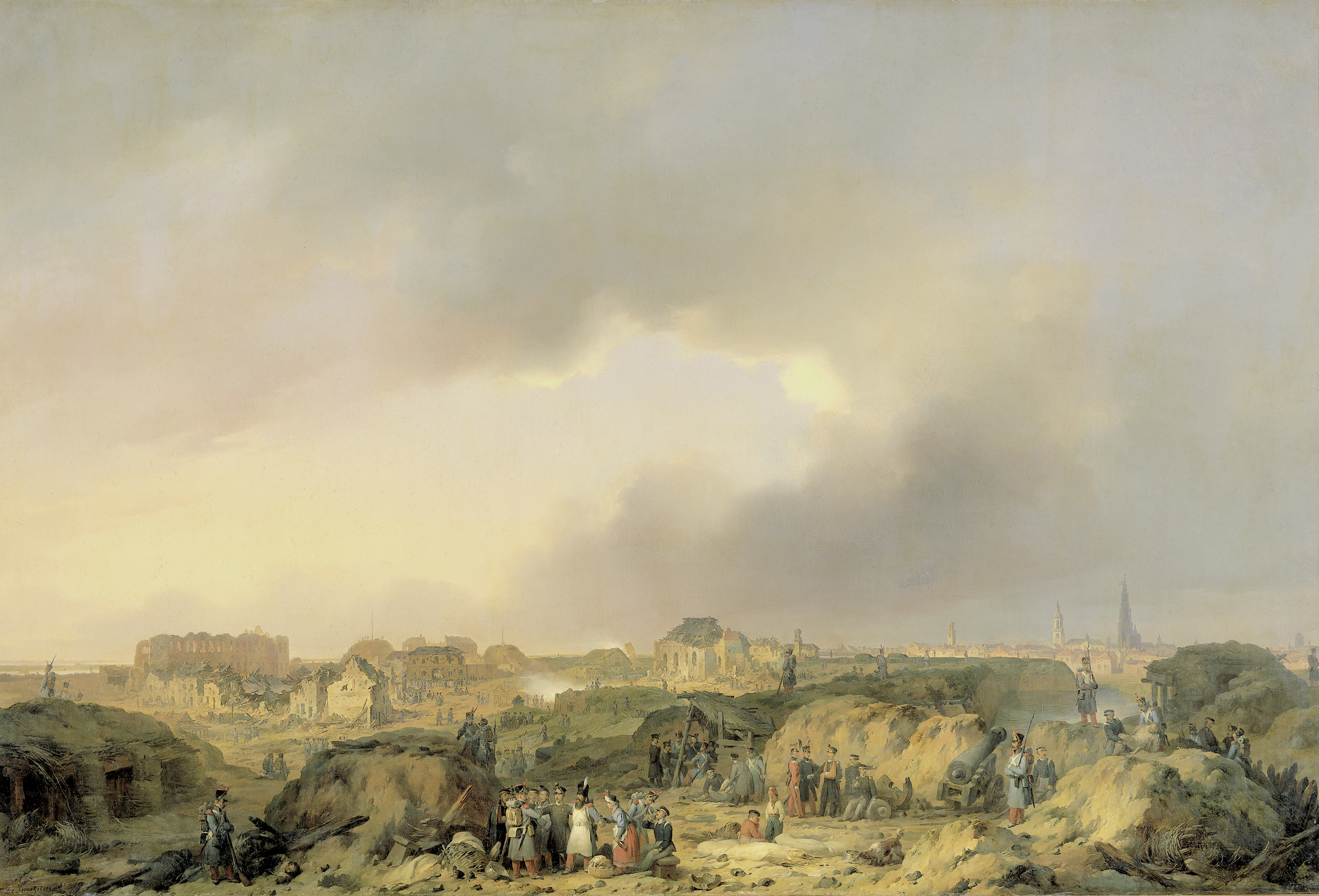
The citadel of Antwerp after the bombardment of 1832

In 1813 he submitted his work Aeneas saving Anchises from the fire of Troy to the Antwerp Salon. It was well received and earned him the prize for painting worth 800 francs. After the establishment of the United Kingdom of the Netherlands, which included the territory of present-day Belgium in 1815, he was initially promised a scholarship to study abroad for three years, which was ultimately not granted. He thus continued his studies in Antwerp and contributed four works to the Antwerp Salon of 1816.

Early on, De Braekeleer decided that he wanted to make a living as a painter and he tried out several genres to find out which one would most likely bring him most success. In addition to historical paintings, he also painted religious paintings, such as St. Sebastian for the Church of Our Lady of the Vineyard in Wijnegem (current location unknown). He contributed some genre paintings of Antwerp city life to the Antwerp Salon of 1819.

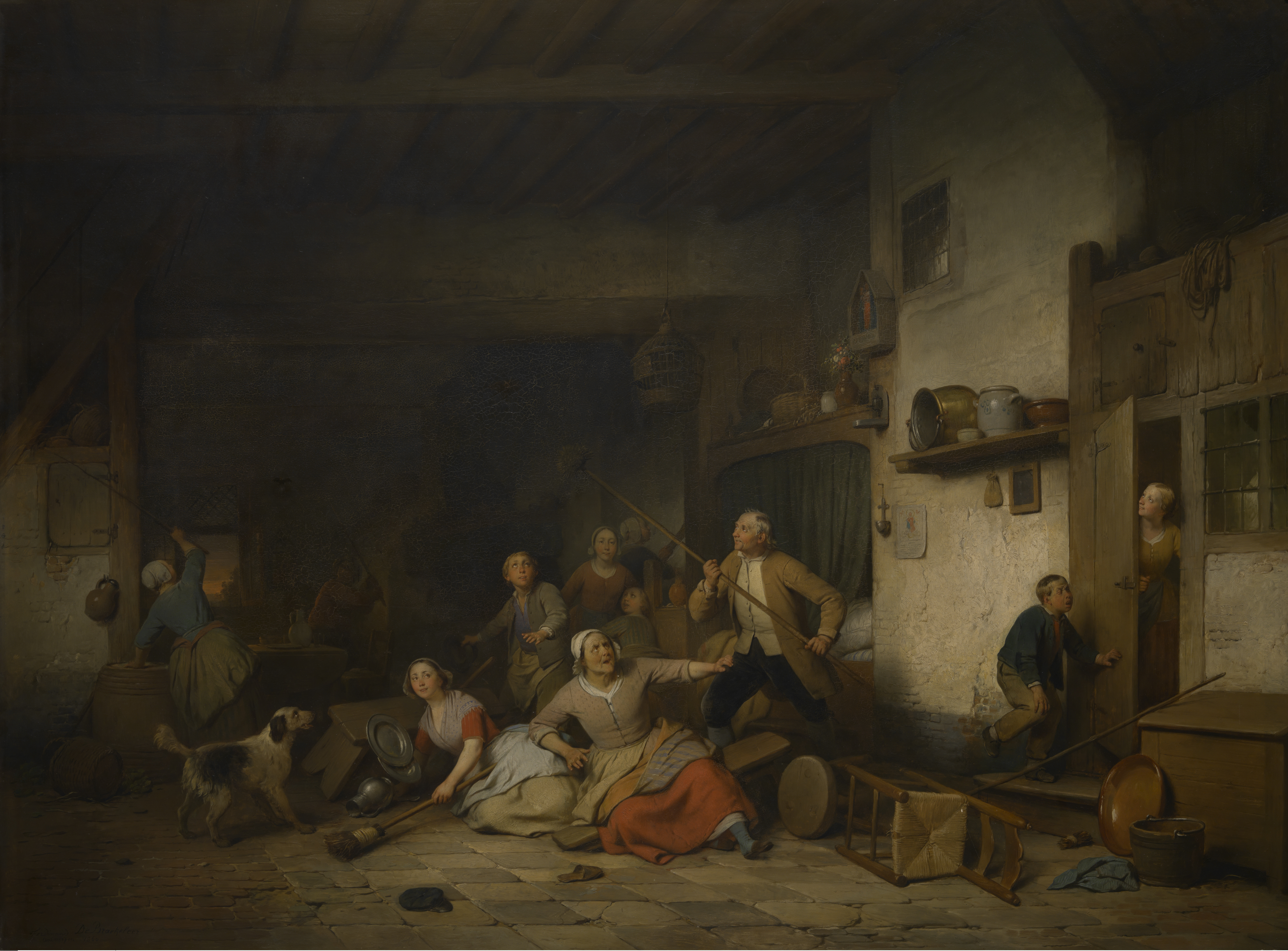
The bat

His Tobias Restoring his Father's Eye Sight won him the Dutch Prix de Rome in the category of historical paintings in 1819, the year in which the Prix was extended for the first time to the Belgian territory. This prize provided him with a scholarship that allowed him to study in Italy. He left for Rome in December 1819 to further his studies. During his stay in Rome his tutor Van Bree visited him and the pair travelled together to several Italian cities, including Naples, Ancona, Florence, Bologna and Venice. Fascinated by these Italian cities and landscapes, he filled a sketch book with crayon drawings of landscapes and city views, which is currently in the collection of the Royal Library of Belgium in Brussels. By June 1822 he was in Paris from which he sent several of his paintings to Antwerp for the Salon of 1822.

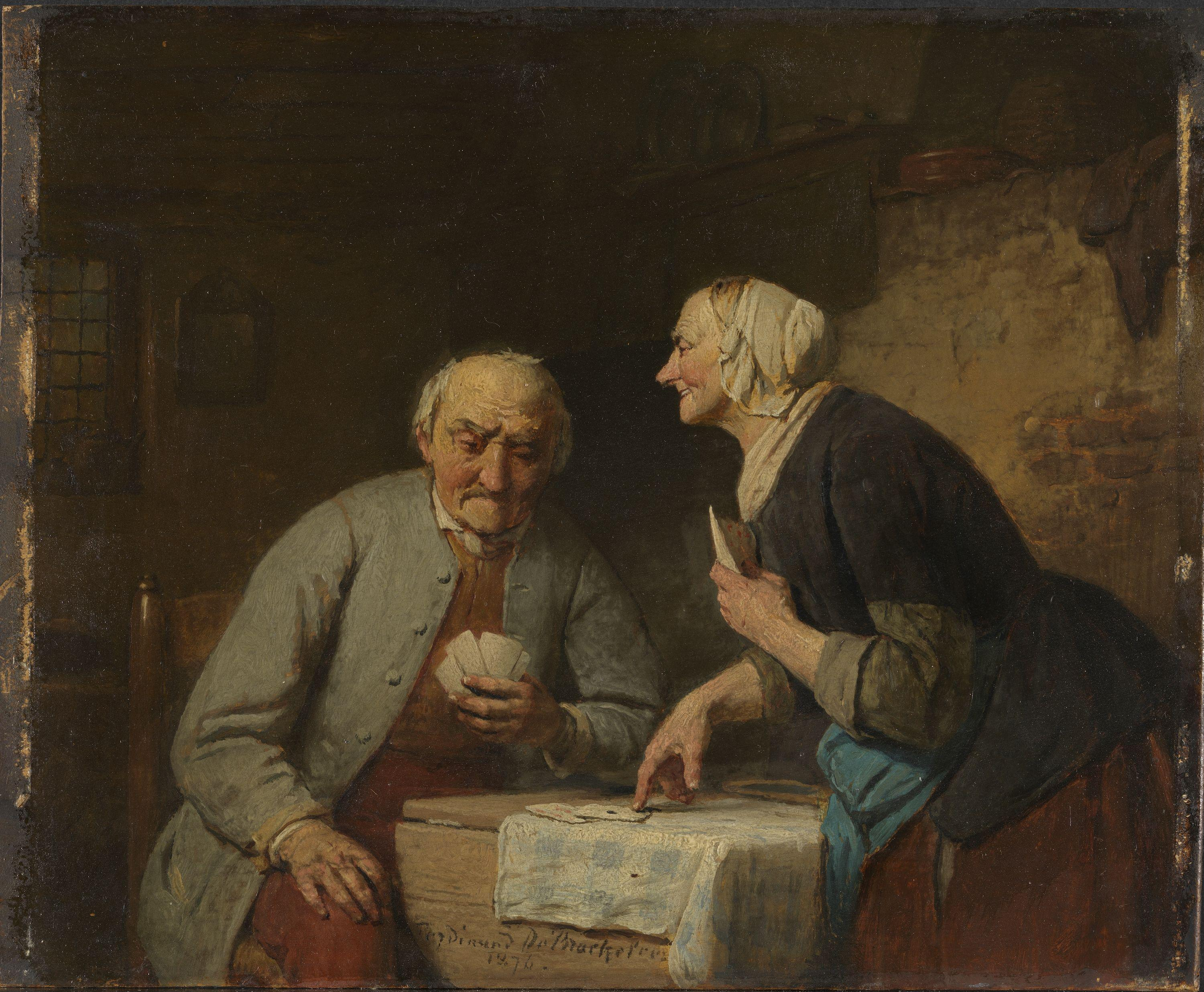
Trump

After his return to Antwerp, he created works inspired by the old Flemish masters. He painted many historical paintings depicting his country's glorious past, including scenes from the lives of famous Flemish and Dutch painters such as Rubens and Jan Steen. In October 1827, he married Marie-Thérèse Leys, the sister of the budding painter Jan August Hendrik Leys who would study with him. They had eleven children of whom Ferdinand the Younger (1828–1857) and Henri de Braekeleer (1840–1888) followed in their father's footsteps and became painters. His nephew Adriaan Ferdinand de Braekeleer (1818–1904) was also a painter. In 1830 Belgium declared its independence, which created another opportunity for De Braekeleer to paint various works on Belgium's past. His The citadel of Antwerp after the bombardment of 1832 about the 1832 bombardments of Antwerp by the Dutch army earned him a lot of attention. In 1836 he was appointed the head of the committee responsible for erecting in Antwerp a statue of Rubens. He also supervised the restoration of Rubens' masterpieces the Raising of the Cross and the Deposition (both in the Antwerp Cathedral).

His reputation continued to grow. At the Brussels Salon of 1836, his The Schoolmistress won a silver medal, which he refused (although he collected the prize money) because his other contribution to the Salon, a history painting depicting a scene from the Spanish Fury had not been awarded a prize. The success of his Celebration of the Third Thursday in Lent at the Children's School and the 50th Wedding Anniversary (both in the Royal Museums of Fine Arts of Belgium) at the Brussels Salon of 1839 gained him international recognition. He gained official recognition in Belgium and was made a knight of the Order of Leopold. In 1847, he was appointed to the Royal Academy of Belgium. He was the cofounder of the Vereniging van Antwerpse kunstenaars (the 'Association of Antwerp artists') together with Henri Leys, Gustave Wappers, Nicaise de Keyser, Josephus Laurentius Dyckmans and Joseph Lies. He exhibited again at the Antwerp Salon in 1852. He became a teacher at the Antwerp academy in 1855. In 1861, he was elected an honorary associate of the Imperial Academy of Arts in Saint Petersburg.

He became a curator of the Royal Museum of Fine Arts Antwerp in 1864.

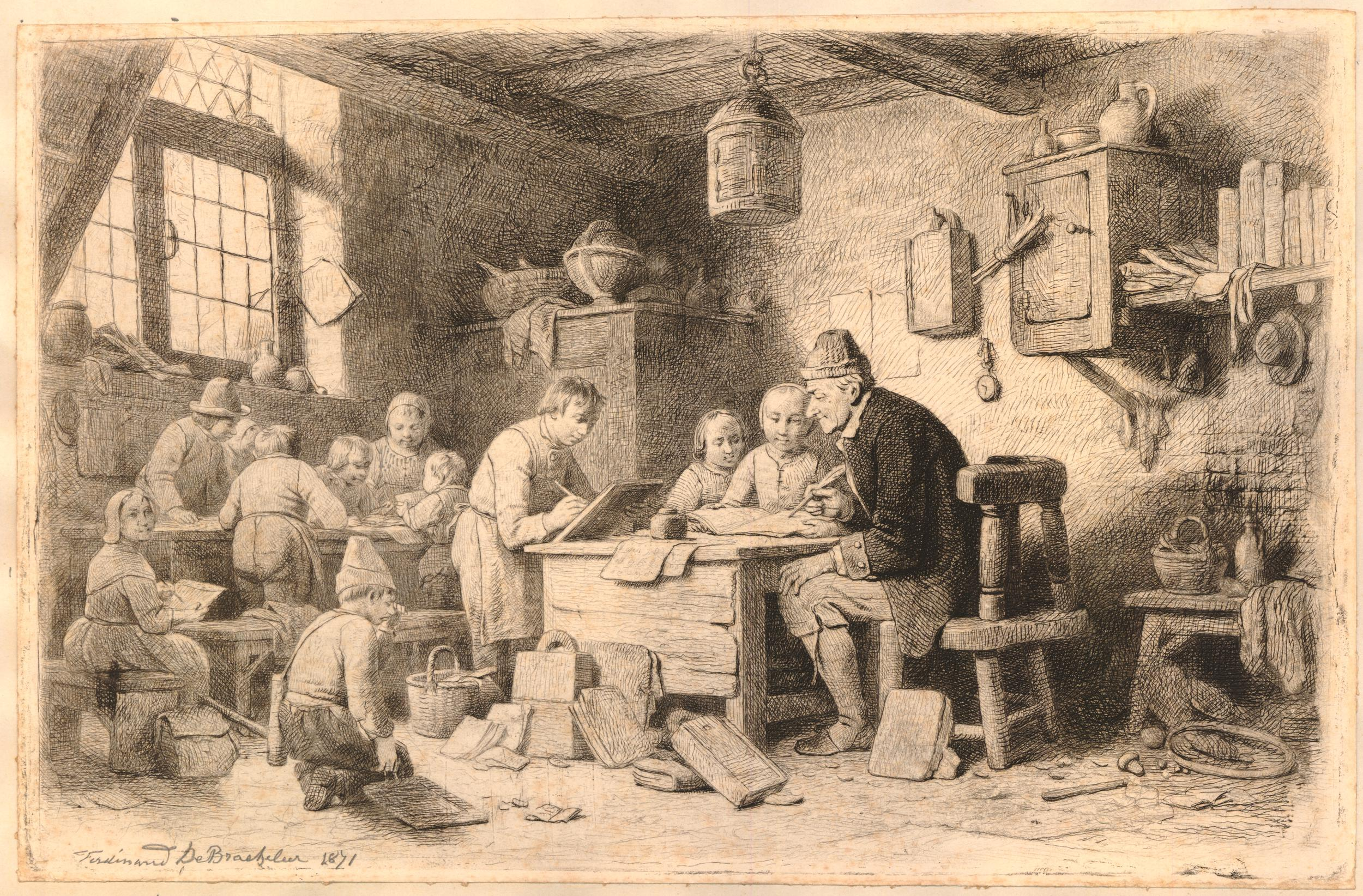
The school master

Ferdinand de Braekeleer was widowed in 1874 and his health declined rapidly. He managed to handle the brush until the end of his life, leaving unfinished a large painting of the Feast of St. Thomas, a subject he had treated many years before for the Belgian King, but his eye and hand were no longer able to serve his thoughts. Surrounded by his daughters, he died in Antwerp on 16 May 1883, at the age of 91.

== Work ==
De Braekeleer is known for his paintings of genre scenes, church interiors, historic events, religious scenes, cityscapes, market scenes and market still lifes. He was also a talented printmaker and etcher who made various prints with genre scenes. He was appreciated for his talents as a colourist and draughtsman. He is particularly remembered for his genre paintings steeped in the spirit of the 17th-century Dutch and Flemish paintings of Jan Steen, van Ostade and David Teniers the Younger. Although his work was left behind by developments in the second half of the 19th century, he played an important role in reviving Belgian painting through the high quality of his genre works and his role as a teacher of the next generation of artists.

== Pupils ==
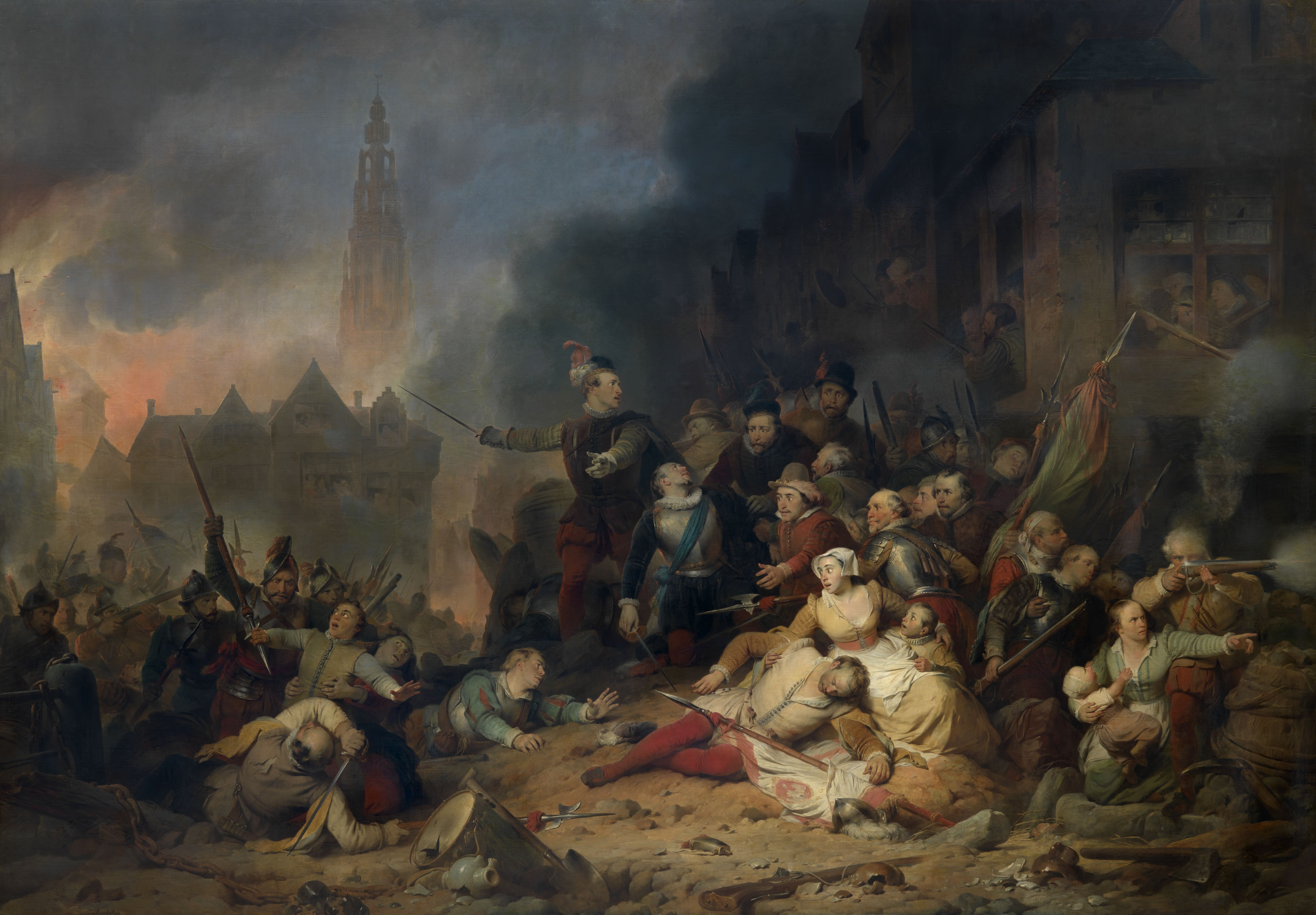
The Spanish Fury in Antwerp

Besides his sons, he tutored several other artists who became influential, including:

- Louis Antoine Carolus
- Hendrik Joseph Gommarus Carpentero
- Adriaan Ferdinand De Braekeleer
- François Antoine De Bruycker
- Xavier De Cock
- Joseph Dens
- Robert van Eijsden
- Willem Jodocus Mattheus Engelberts
- Leopold Fissette
- Napoléon François Ghesquière
- Paul Haesaert
- Aloïs Pieter Paul Hunin
- Jacob Jacobs
- Johan Janssens
- Edouard Knudden
- Jan Baptist Lammens
- Jan August Hendrik Leys
- Petrus Marius Molijn
- Florent Mols
- Aimé Pez
- Willem Rikkers
- Louis Somers
- Charles Venneman
- Constant Wauters
- Pierre-Joseph Witdoeck

== Selected works ==
- Aeneas carrying Anchises from the fire of Troy, 1813
- The Healing of Tobit, 1819; current location unknown
- St. Sebastian; current location unknown
- Courtship, current location unknown
- The Oyster Eaters, 1829; current location unknown
- The citadel of Antwerp after the bombardment of 1832; Royal Museum of Fine Arts, Antwerp
- Tavern scene with musicians, 1843 based on a work by Adriaen van Ostade
- The Siege of Haarlem; Teylers Museum
- Farmhouse with peasants, drawing. Schlossmuseum Weimar
- Old hunter with young woman, 1867; private collection

== Literature ==
- Belyaev, N. S. (2018). Honorary Free Associates of the Imperial Academy of Arts. Brief biographical guide (PDF). Saint Petersburg: Russian Academy of Sciences. p. 28. ISBN 978-5-336-00234-8.
