= Pierre-Joseph Witdoeck =

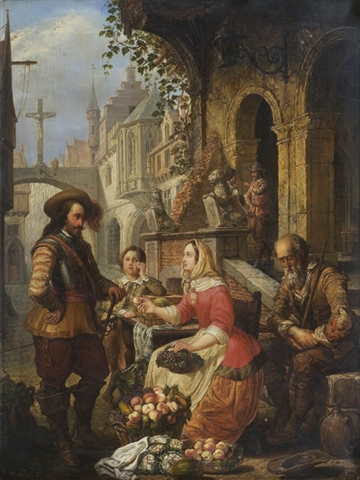
The Vegetable Seller

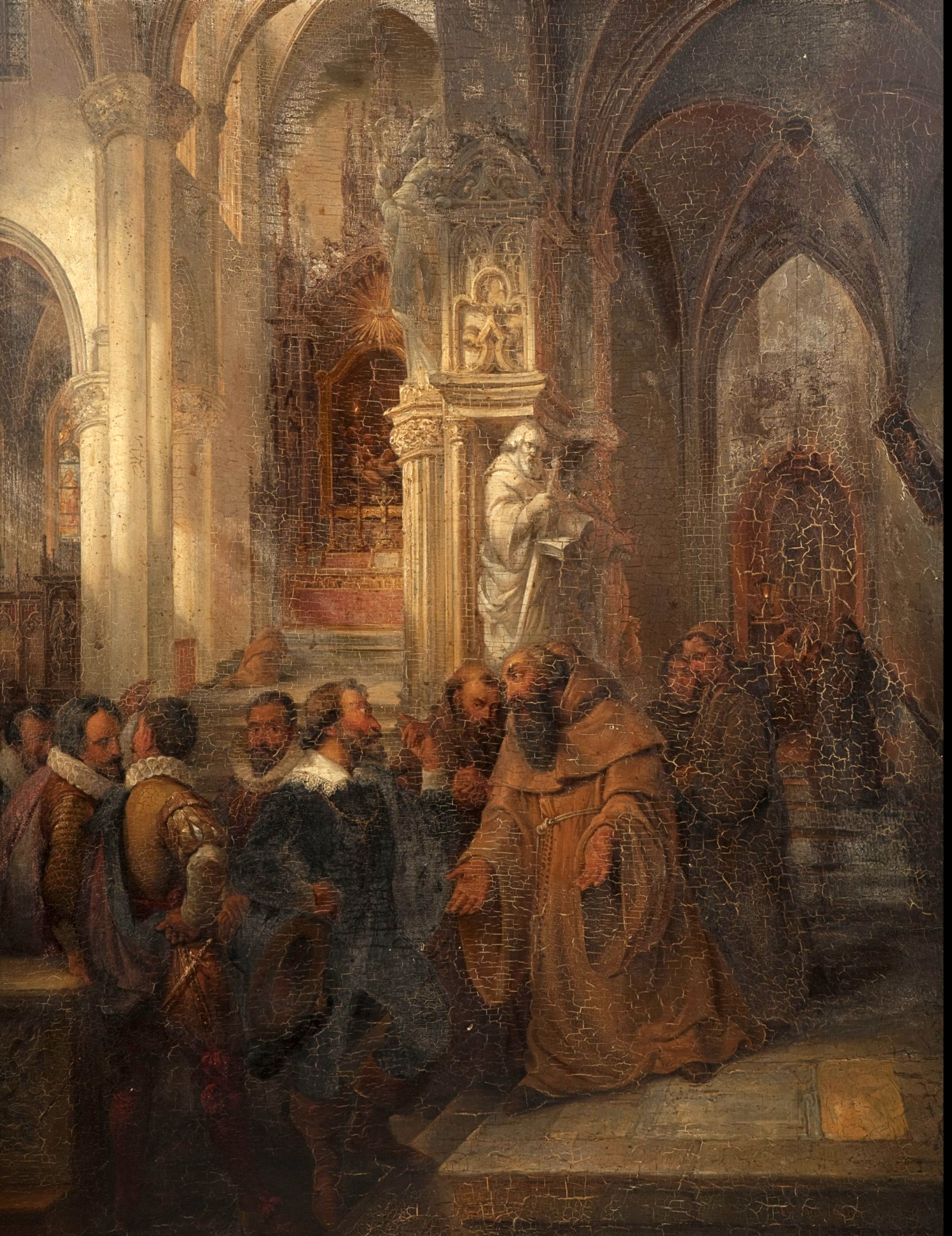
Rubens Meeting Collantes

Pierre-Joseph Witdoeck, also known as Petrus Josephus Witdoeck (4 January 1803, Antwerp – 16 October 1889, Tournai) was a Belgian painter and architect. Some sources give his year of death as 1840 or 1873.

== Biography ==
He was the son of Franciscus Donatus Witdoeck (1766–1834), a painter and professor of architecture at the Royal Academy, who gave him his first lessons. Later, he studied with Ferdinand de Braekeleer and Mathieu-Ignace Van Brée. One of his ancestors, Hans Witdoeck, was a student of Peter Paul Rubens.

In 1824, he accompanied Colonel Bernard Rottiers on a scientific expedition sponsored by King William I of the Netherlands. They visited Algeria, Greece, Egypt and India; returning in 1827 through Italy. He brought back numerous sketches of architecture and antiquities, notably from the island of Rhodes. They were published by Colonel Rottiers in 1830.

After that, he taught architecture, painting and design at the Jesuit college in Brugelette, in the province of Hainaut. This was followed by an appointment as the City Architect of Turnhout, where he also founded and directed a design academy.

He married Marie-Antoinette van Haesendonck and they had twelve children; several of whom became painters, but of no particular note. His daughter, Marie-Thérèse, married Colonel Léon Braconnier, a colonial administrator.

He was especially interested in religious and historical subjects. Many of his works are devoted to the history of the Spanish Netherlands.

A large collection of his works may be seen at the Broel Museum in Courtrai. The Église Sainte-Catherine de Lille contains a notable representation of the Last Supper, dating from 1843, which is integrated into the altar.

== Sources ==
- Dictionnaire des peintres belges, database BALaT @ the Royal Institute for Cultural Heritage
- Van Der Aa (A.-J), Biographisch Woordenboek der Nederlanden, Ed. J.J. Van Brederode, Haarlem,1877.
