= Albrecht Dürer's Visit to Antwerp in 1520 =

Painting by Henri Leys

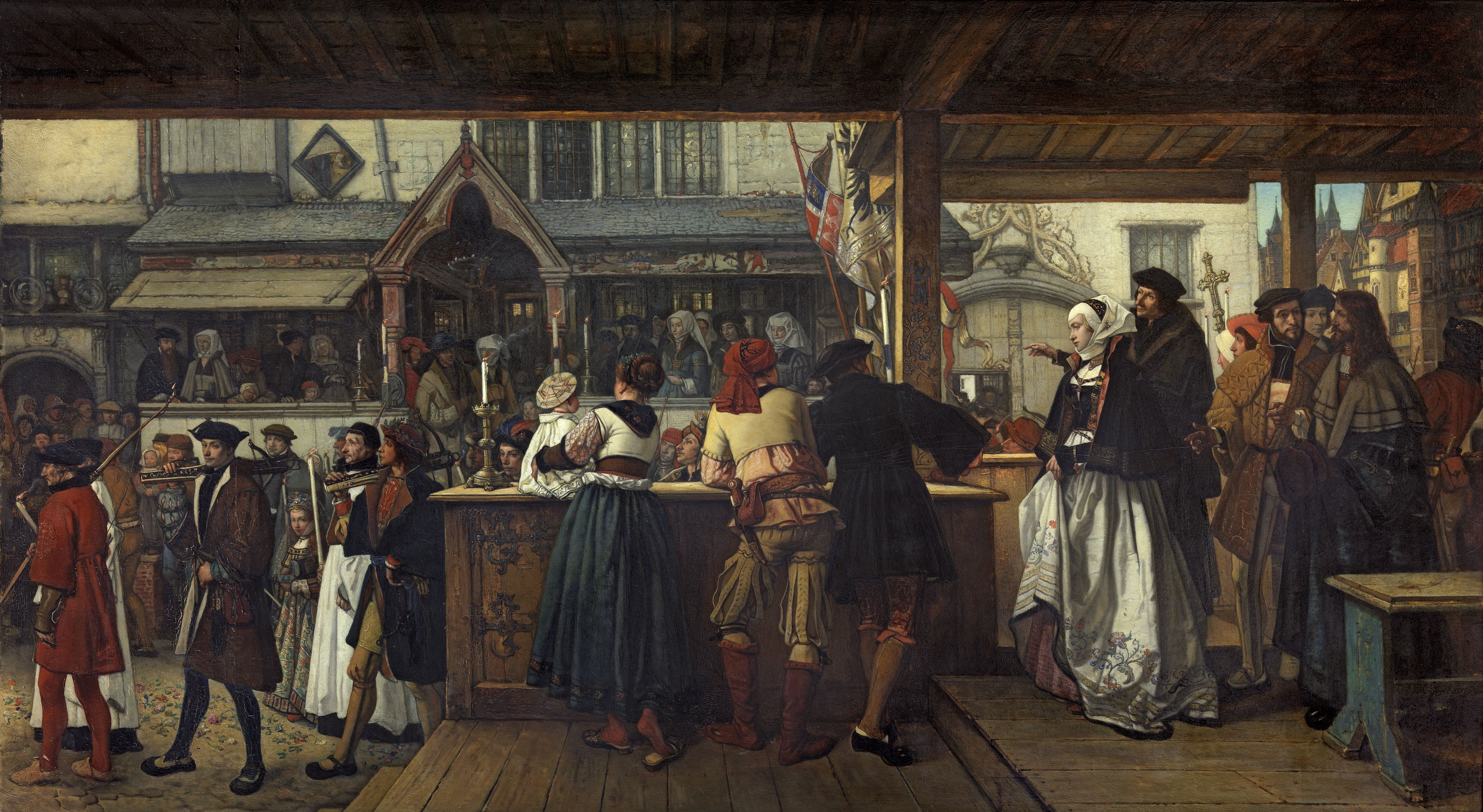
Albrecht Dürer's Visit to Antwerp in 1520 (1855) by Hendrik Leys

Albrecht Dürer's Visit to Antwerp in 1520 is an 1855 oil on panel painting by Hendrik Leys. As its title suggests, it is based on Albrecht Dürer's attendance at the Antwerp Archers' Guild's Lady's Day procession on Sunday 19 August 1520, as described in his travel journal. It is now in the collection of the Royal Museum of Fine Arts, Antwerp under catalogue number 2198.
