= Jan August Hendrik Leys =

Belgian painter (1815–1869)

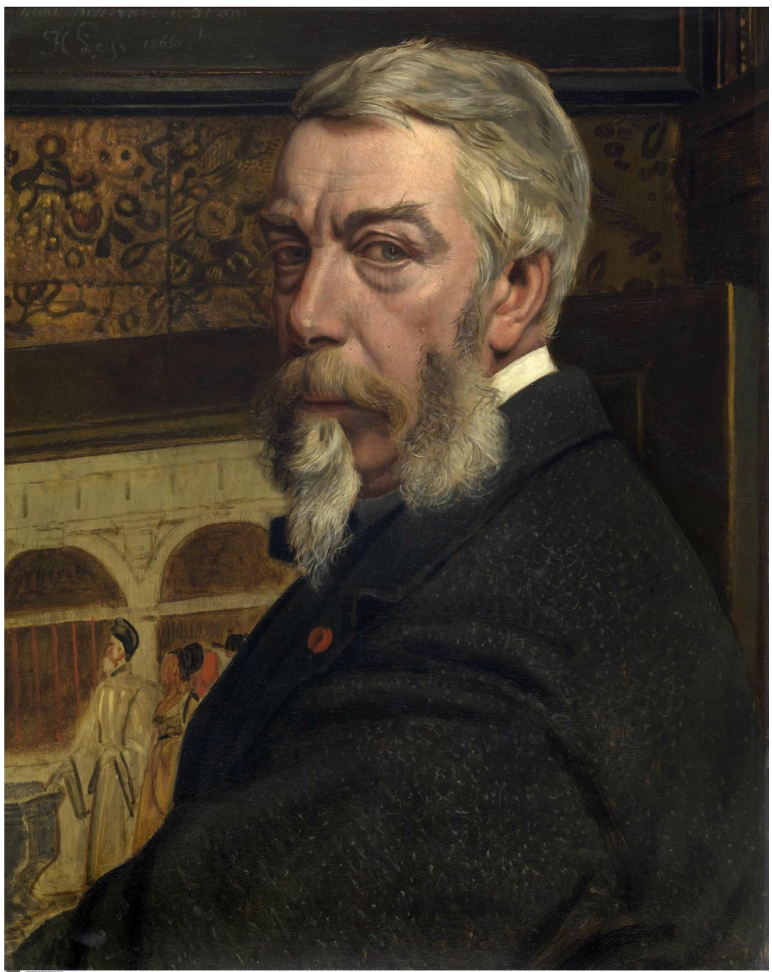
Self-portrait

Henri Leys, Hendrik Leys or Jan August Hendrik, Baron Leys (18 February 1815 – 26 August 1869) was a Belgian painter and printmaker. He was a leading representative of the historical or Romantic school in Belgian art and became a pioneer of the Realist movement in Belgium. His history and genre paintings and portraits earned him a European-wide reputation and his style was influential on artists in and outside Belgium.

== Life ==
Henri Leys was born in Antwerp as the son of Hendrik-Jozef-Martinus Leys and Maria-Theresia Craen. His father ran a printing business specializing in religious images printed from old copper plates. The first etching by Henri Leys was a funeral image made for his father's shop in 1831. Henry Leys was not very interested in school but was very keen on drawing. His parents supported his proclivity and let him study under a furniture painter who lived next door.

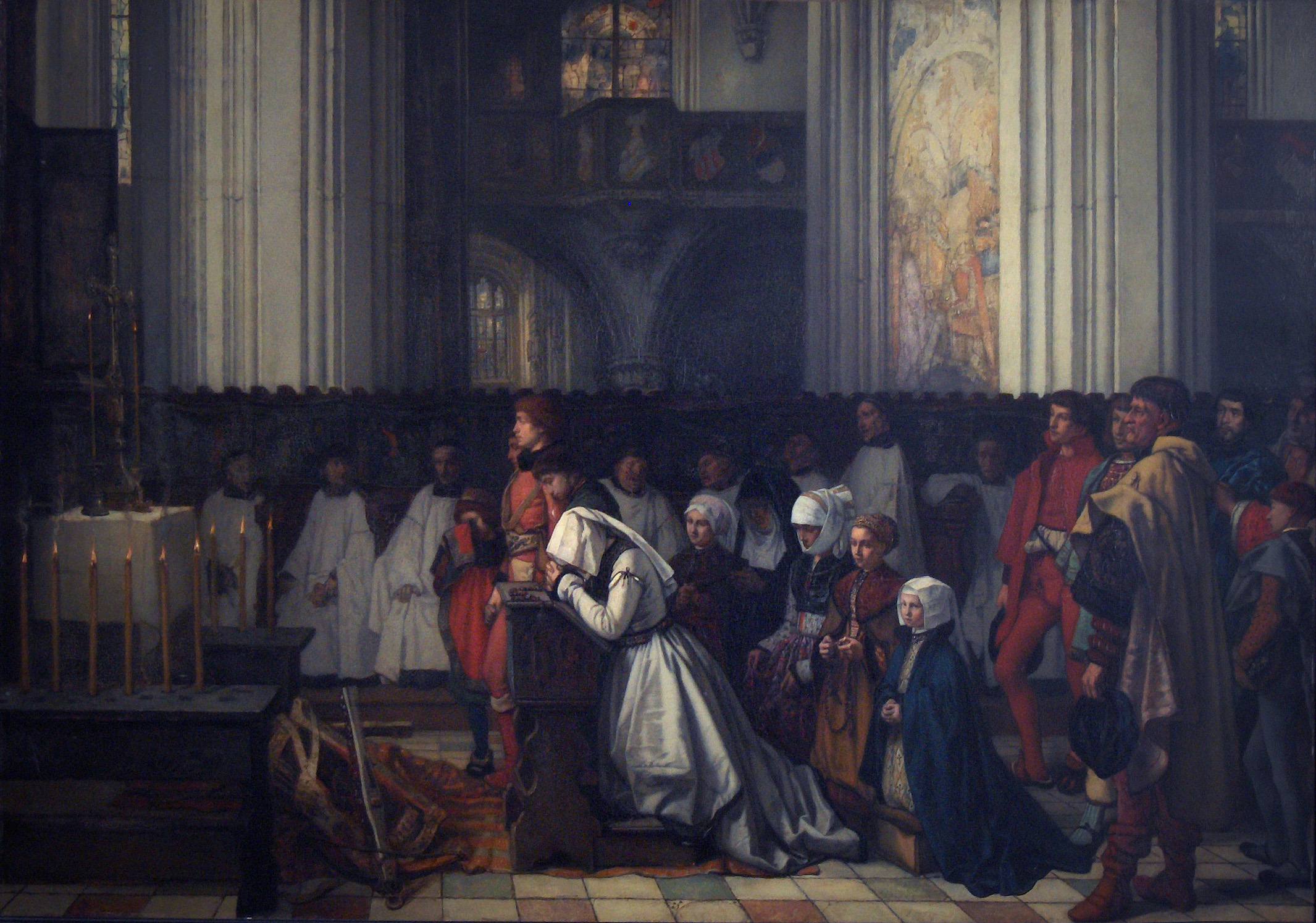
The Mass of Berthal de Haze

Leys subsequently studied at the Antwerp Academy of Fine Arts: from 1829 to 1832 he studied from the Antique and from 1832 to 1833 he studied drawing from life. During this period he started to work in the studio of his brother-in-law, the genre painter Ferdinand de Braekeleer. One of Leys' teachers at the academy was Mattheus Ignatius van Bree (1773–1839), the director of the academy. According to a widely circulated story, during a lecture by van Bree on the draping of the gown and peplos of figures from antiquity Leys made a remark about van Bree's old-fashioned breeches. Van Bree did not appreciate the joke. But as the young hothead refused to apologize, the director expelled him from the academy. Leys never returned to the academy, not even as a teacher after he had achieved international success.

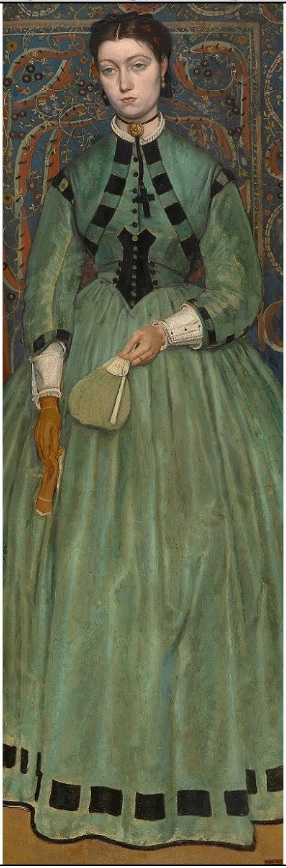
Lucie Leys, daughter of the painter

From the start of his career Leys painted history and genre subjects. During this period Leys often collaborated with the Belgian Romantic painter Gustaf Wappers (1803–1874). Both artists were interested in nationalistic subjects painted in styles that owe much to the example of 16th- and 17th-century Flemish painting. In 1835 Leys went to Paris where he visited the studio of Eugène Delacroix and met Paul Delaroche. The influence of Delaroche's Romanticism is evident in Leys' early work. His precocious talent was manifested at the Brussels Salon of 1836 where he exhibited his Massacre of the magistrates of Louvain for which he received high praise.

Leys married Adelaïde van Haren in 1841. The couple had two daughters and a son. The family Leys initially lived in the Hobokenstraat. In 1855 Leys had a more spacious house built in the street, which now bears his name, and was then called the Statiestraat. From 1857 to 1861 he worked on murals to decorate the dining room of his house.

Leys was together with Joseph Lies, Jozef Dyckmans, Ferdinand de Braekeleer, Gustaaf Wappers, Nicaise de Keyser and other Antwerp artists, one of founders of the Antwerpse Kunstenaarsvereniging (Antwerp Artists Association). In 1852 this association merged into the Confederation of Arts, Letters and Sciencesr of the Kunstverbond or Cercle Artistique, Litéraire et Scientifique d'Anvers ('Art Association'), a mainly French-speaking society of intellectuals and artists. Its honorary chairman was the liberal mayor of Antwerp Jan Frans Loos. In the same year a heated discussion had started about the reform of the Antwerp Academy after its director Gustaf Wappers had resigned from his post following political pressure. The Kunstverbond championed profound changes to the organisation of the Antwerp Academy. Leys' friend and fellow member of the Kunstverbond Joseph Lies authored a plan that called for the separation of the artistic and administrative functions in the academy and for ending the practice of appointing the director for life. Leys, who was also member of the city council, defended the plan in the city council, but it was defeated.

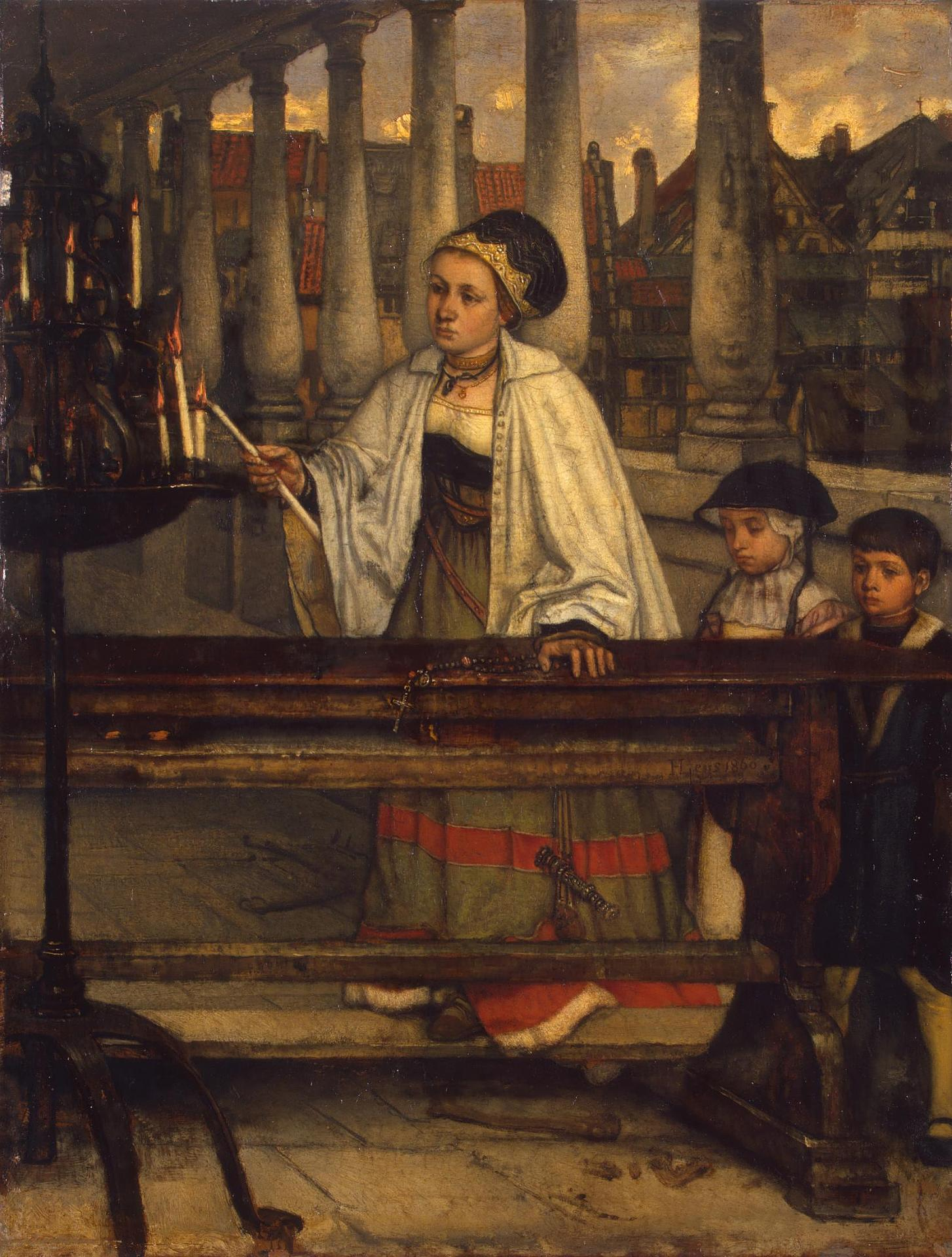
The vow

Leys gained a considerable reputation at home and abroad and worked for an international clientele from Germany, France, England and Russia. He was made a knight in the French Legion of Honour and was awarded the Order of St. Michael by the king of Bavaria. Leys won a gold medal at the International Exhibition in Paris in 1855 for his historical painting The Mass of Berthal de Haze (Royal Museums of Fine Arts of Belgium, Brussels). Critics praised the high quality of his reconstruction of the past through costumes and architecture, the realistic poses and facial expressions, the rigorous drawing and the brightness of the colours. Leys won another gold medal in Paris in 1867. In 1862 Leys was created a baron by the Belgian King Leopold I.

At the request of the Belgian government, which supported the development of history painting in the country, the Antwerp city administration gave Leys in 1861 a commission to decorate the interior of the restored Antwerp Town Hall. He was asked to paint over a period of 10 years 10 monumental murals depicting key events in the city's history. Four of the murals along with 11 portraits of historical rulers of Belgium were completed between 1863 and 1869, the year in which Leys died. Leys had also received a commission from the Brussels city administration for a similar program of murals in its town hall but this commission was never commenced due to the untimely death of Leys in 1869 in Antwerp.

Leys had a number of pupils. Among these the best-known internationally is Sir Lawrence Alma-Tadema who assisted Leys with the murals in the Antwerp Town Hall. Another well-known pupil was his nephew Henri De Braekeleer (1840–1888). Other pupils were Thomas Simon Cool, Charles Napier Hemy, Willem Linnig the Elder, Petrus Marius Molijn, Hendrik Albert van Trigt and Alexis Van Hamme.

== Work ==
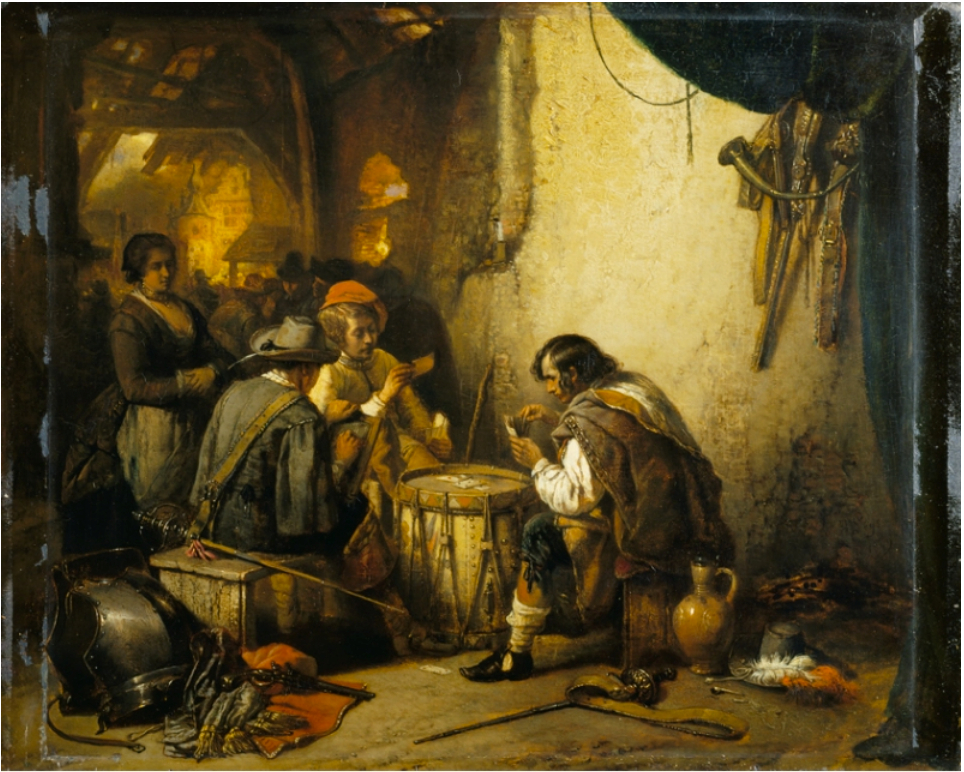
Soldiers playing cards

Henry Leys initially worked in the Romantic style he had learned from Gustaf Wappers with whom he collaborated in the early phase of his career. He treated the typically Romantic subjects, ranging from heroic scenes of war and brigandage to scenes of daily life such as weddings and country festivals. Some of his works show the influence of Paul Delaroche, whom he had met in Paris in 1835.

From about 1839, Leys distanced himself from the pathos and historical anecdotes of the Romantic school. He began painting scenes set in 16th-century Antwerp, combining details studied from life with a deliberately archaising style reminiscent of 15th and 16th-century Flemish and German painting. He abandoned the bravura technique inspired by Rubens in favour of line, shape and local colour.

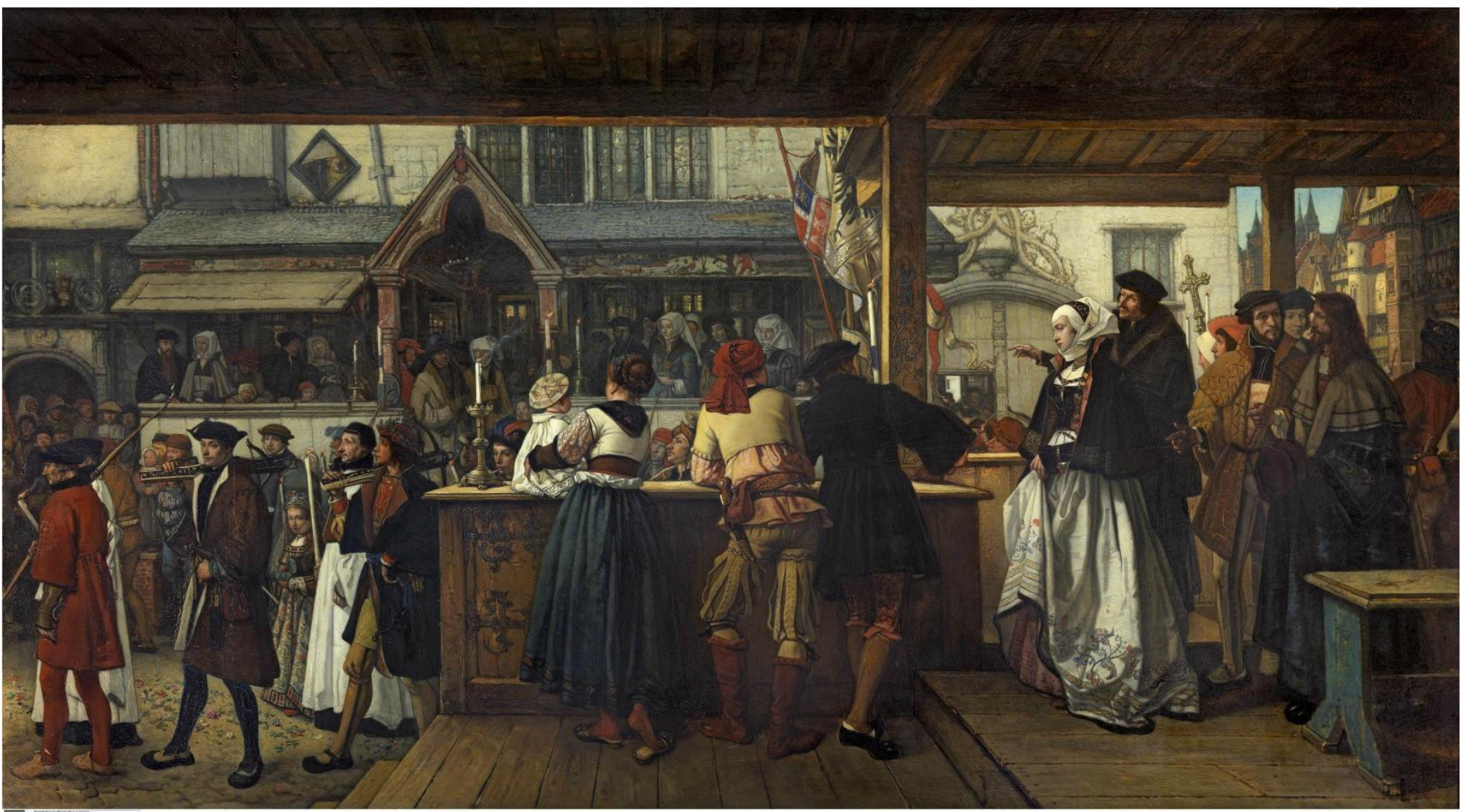
Albrecht Dürer visiting Antwerp in 1520

Many of the paintings from this period depict specific historical subjects, while others were genre scenes or portraits. This development towards Realism made him one of the pioneers of this artistic movement in Belgium. The painting Wedding in Flanders in the 17th century (1839; Royal Museum of Fine Arts Antwerp) was the first to herald this more sober style. His works from the 1640s attest to Leys' search for historical and psychological truthfulness, which replaced the emphasis on pathos and sentimental anecdote of his earlier work. An example of his works that abandoned historical legend in favour of a realistic depiction of historical events is the composition Albrecht Dürer's Visit to Antwerp in 1520. Leys based this picture on the account given by Dürer in his own journal of the event. In his scenes of 16th and 17th-century Antwerp, Leys sought to reflect the spirit and atmosphere of that time. His compositions of historical events and of everyday life were realistic and may have been inspired by contemporary French Realists Gustave Courbet and Jean-François Millet.

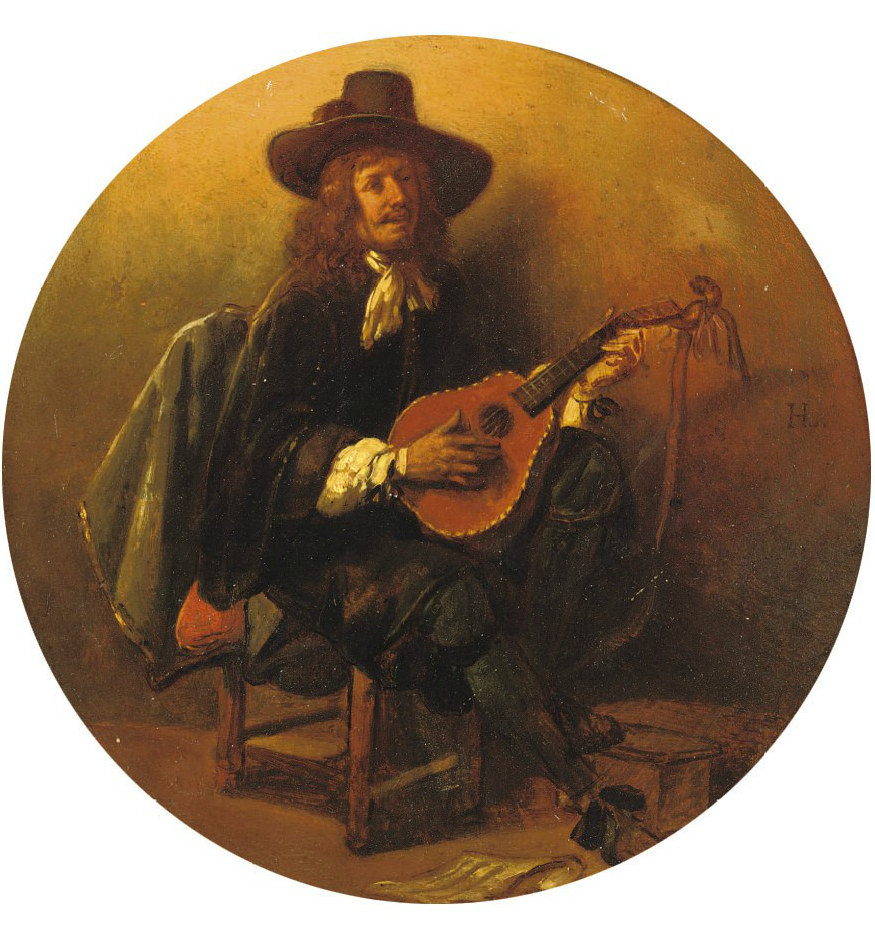
The singer

Leys' study of 16th-century Flemish and German painters also contributed to the development of a personal style, which mingled archaistic rigidity with realistic observation. With these works, he earned a following among many younger artists in Belgium as well as a considerable reputation in France, where he won a gold medal at the International Exhibition in Paris in 1855 for his historical painting The Mass of Berthal de Haze (Royal Museums of Fine Arts of Belgium, Brussels).

Leys was a gifted portrait painter as shown by his self-portrait, and the portraits of his wife and daughter and of his fellow artists such as the portrait of the architect Alphonse Balat.

Leys influenced many young Belgian artists. Some, such as Joseph Lies, Franz Vinck and Karel Ooms followed his work very closely. Leys' work also exerted a strong influence on his compatriots Jean Pierre François Lamorinière and Victor Lagye. James Tissot was influenced by Leys in his early work. Other artists such as Henri De Braekeleer and Jan Stobbaerts were able to transform Leys' teachings in a new and original language.

== Honours ==
- Member of the Royal Academy
- Knight of the Order of Leopold
- Commander in the Order of Leopold, 1900
