= Petrus Marius Molijn =

Dutch painter

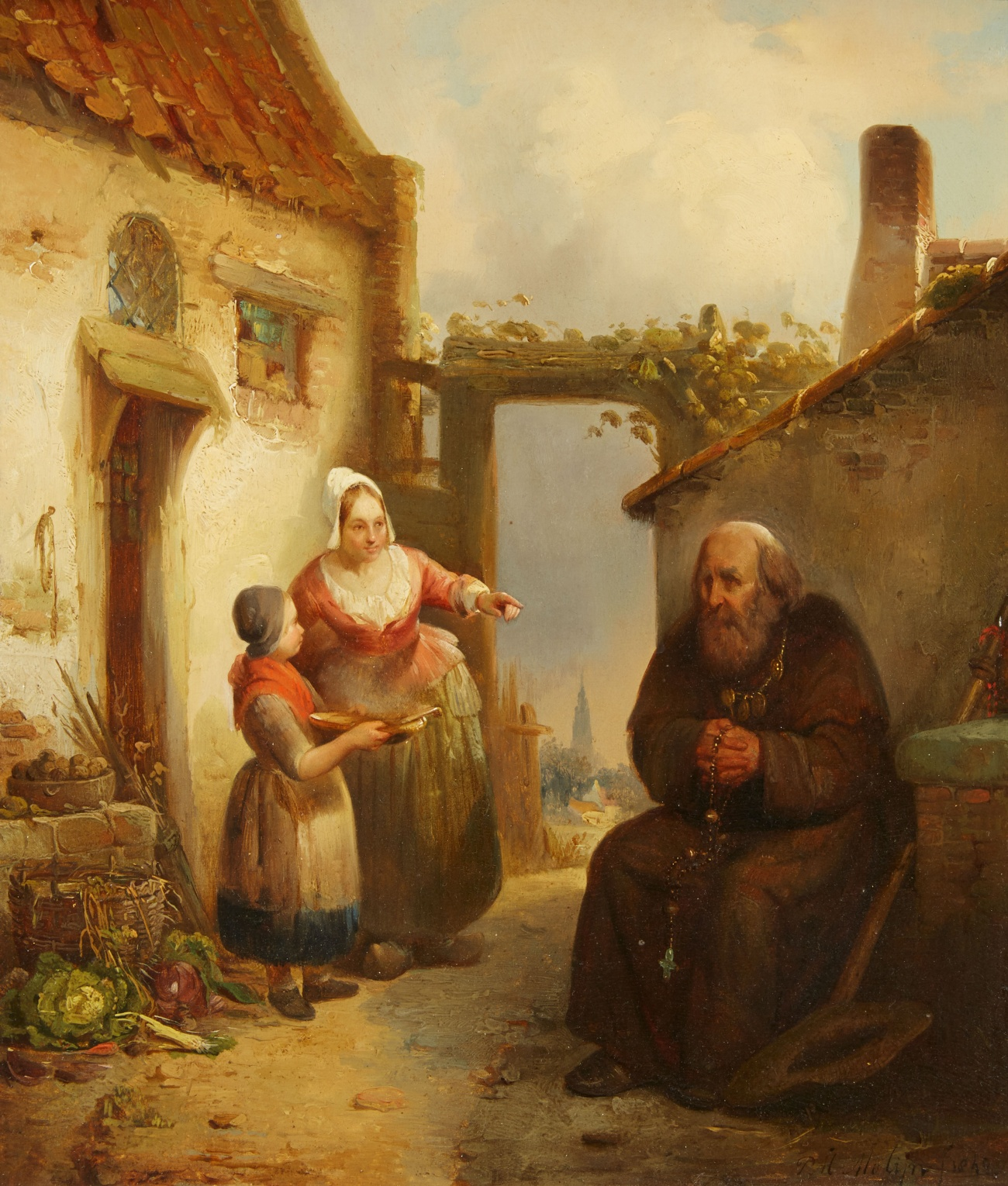
The Mendicant Monk

Petrus Marius Molijn (9 July 1819, Rotterdam - 28 April 1849, Antwerp) was a Dutch painter. Much of his career was spent in Antwerp, which had become part of Belgium by the time of his death.

== Biography ==
He began his artistic studies at the Royal Academy of Fine Arts (Antwerp), where he was taught by Ferdinand De Braekeleer, Jan Hendrik van Grootvelt and Henri Leys.

His work encompasses several genres, including landscapes, interiors, and still-lifes. He also worked as an etcher and lithographer. In 1845, he was named a member of the Koninklijke Akademie van Beeldende Kunsten (predecessor to the Rijksakademie) in Amsterdam.

He died in 1849, of unspecified causes, aged only twenty-nine. A small monument to him has been erected in Antwerp.

== Sources ==
- RKD, Petrus Marius Molijn
- DvBKiN-B, Pieter Marius Molijn
