= Xavier De Cock =

Belgian painter

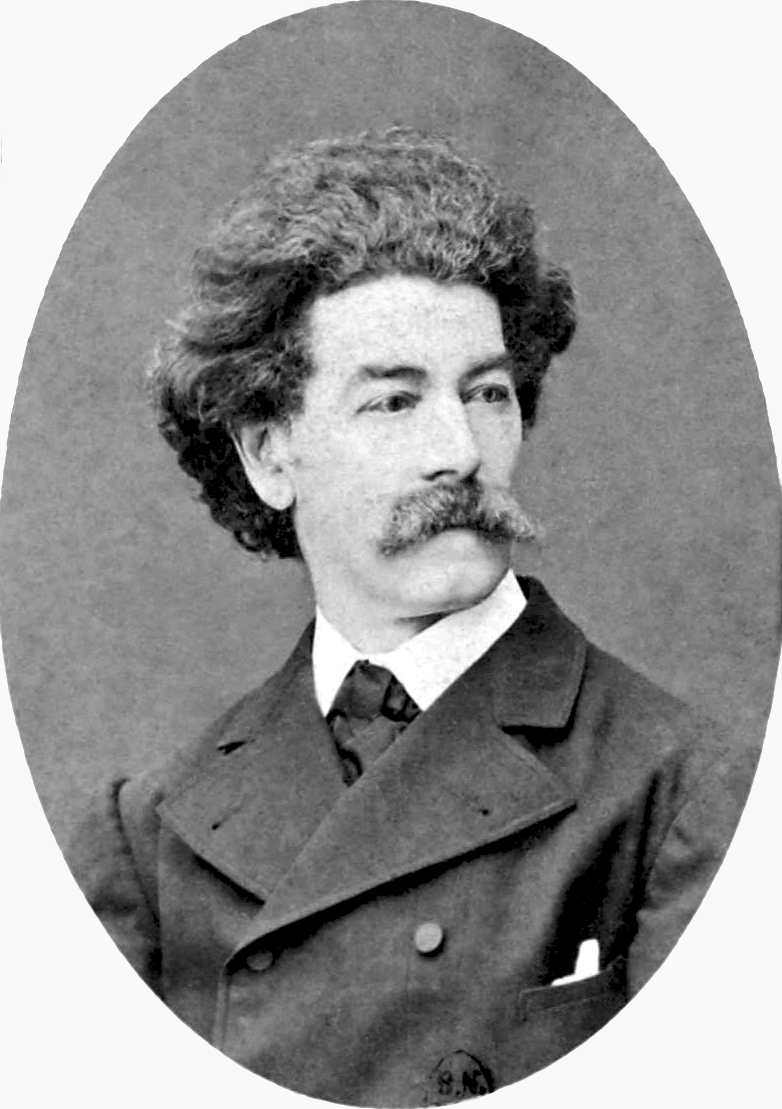
Xavier De Cock (c. 1880)

Xavier De Cock (10 March 1818, Ghent - 11 August 1896, Deurle) was a Belgian painter. He specialized in genre scenes and landscapes with animals.

== Biography ==
His father was a tailor. He studied at the Royal Academy of Fine Arts in Antwerp with Ferdinand de Braekeleer, then travelled to Holland to copy the Old Masters. After that, he painted in the Ardennes before going to Paris, where he lived from 1852 to 1860. In 1859, while painting in Sint-Denijs-Westrem during a visit home, he met a sixteen-year-old orphan girl, whom he married.

At first, his works were inspired by old Dutch landscapes. His regular contact with painters of the Barbizon school encouraged him to adopt a more contemporary style, and he became more successful. Soon, he was admitted to the major exhibitions and treated like a native Frenchman. His works were compared to those of Charles-François Daubigny by the critic Edmond About.

Later in life, he left France to settle in Deurle. He is considered to be one of the precursors of what would come to be called the École de Laethem-Saint-Martin.

His younger brother, Cesar De Cock, became a well known landscape painter. He also lived in Paris and they often worked together.

His works may be seen in the Royal Museums of Fine Arts of Belgium and the Musée Fabre, as well as at museums in Ghent, Courtrai and Liège.

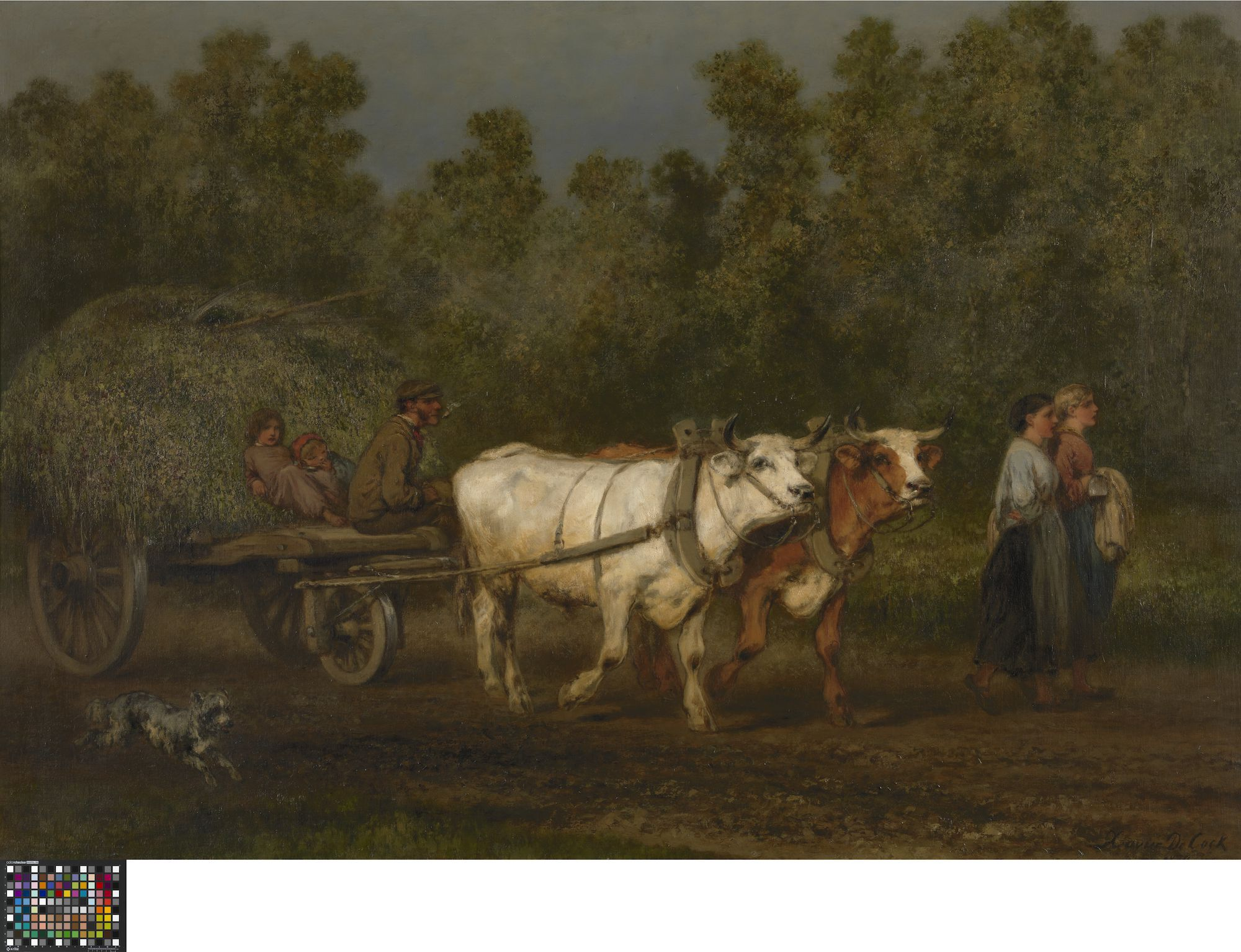
no title Museum van Deinze en de Leiestreek

== Sources ==
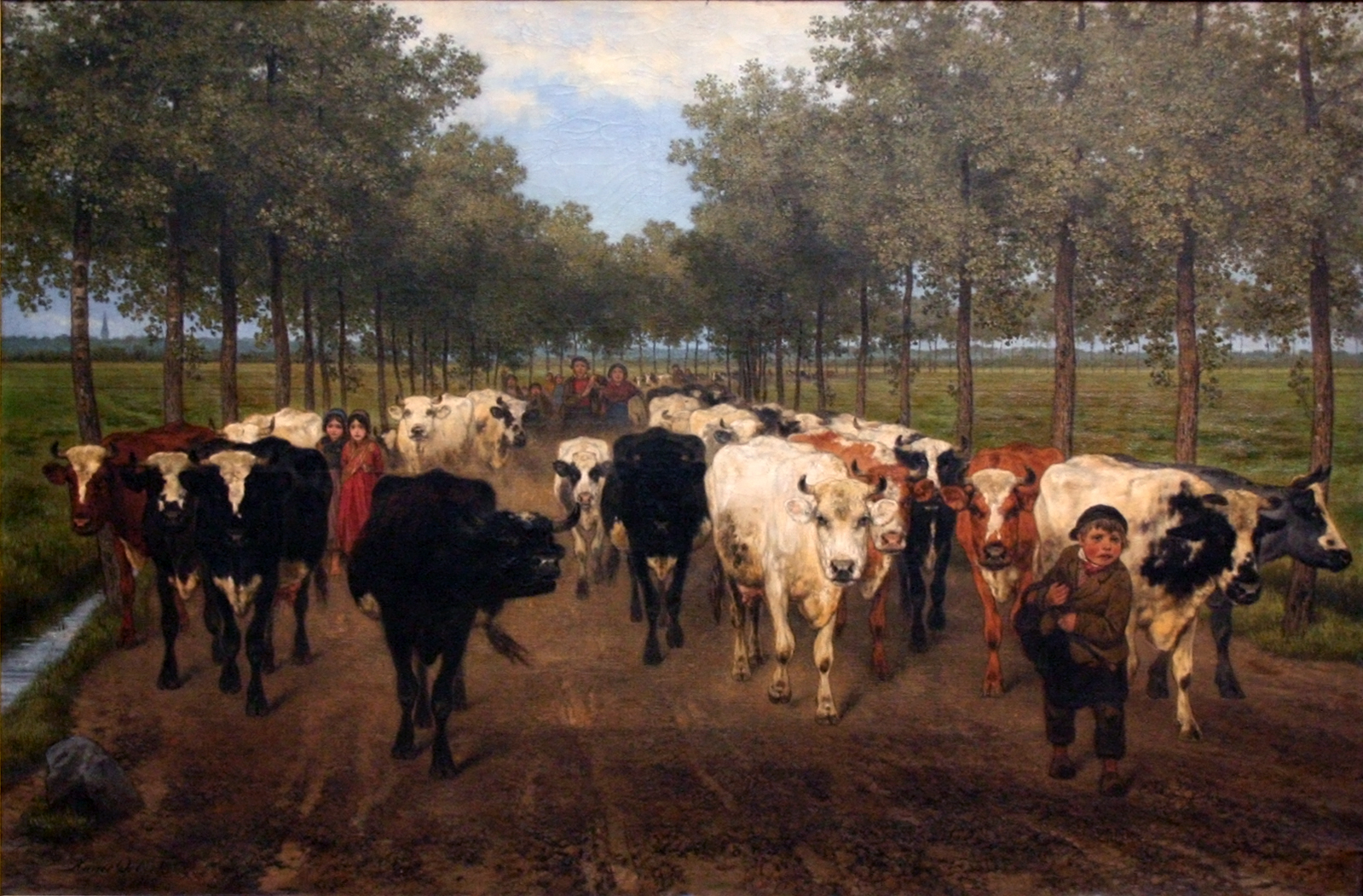
The Meerstrrat in Ghent

- Dictionnaire de la peinture flamande et hollandaise du Moyen Âge à nos jours, Éditions Larousse, 1989 ISBN 2-03-740015-2
- Dictionnaire des peintres belges du s-XIV à nos jours, Renaissance du livre, 1995 ISBN 2-8041-2012-0
- Dictionnaire biographique illustré des artistes en belgique depuis 1830, Arto, 1987 ISBN 2-960008-80-4
