= Thomas Simon Cool =

Dutch painter

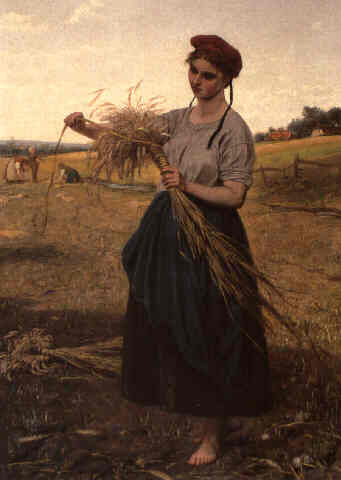

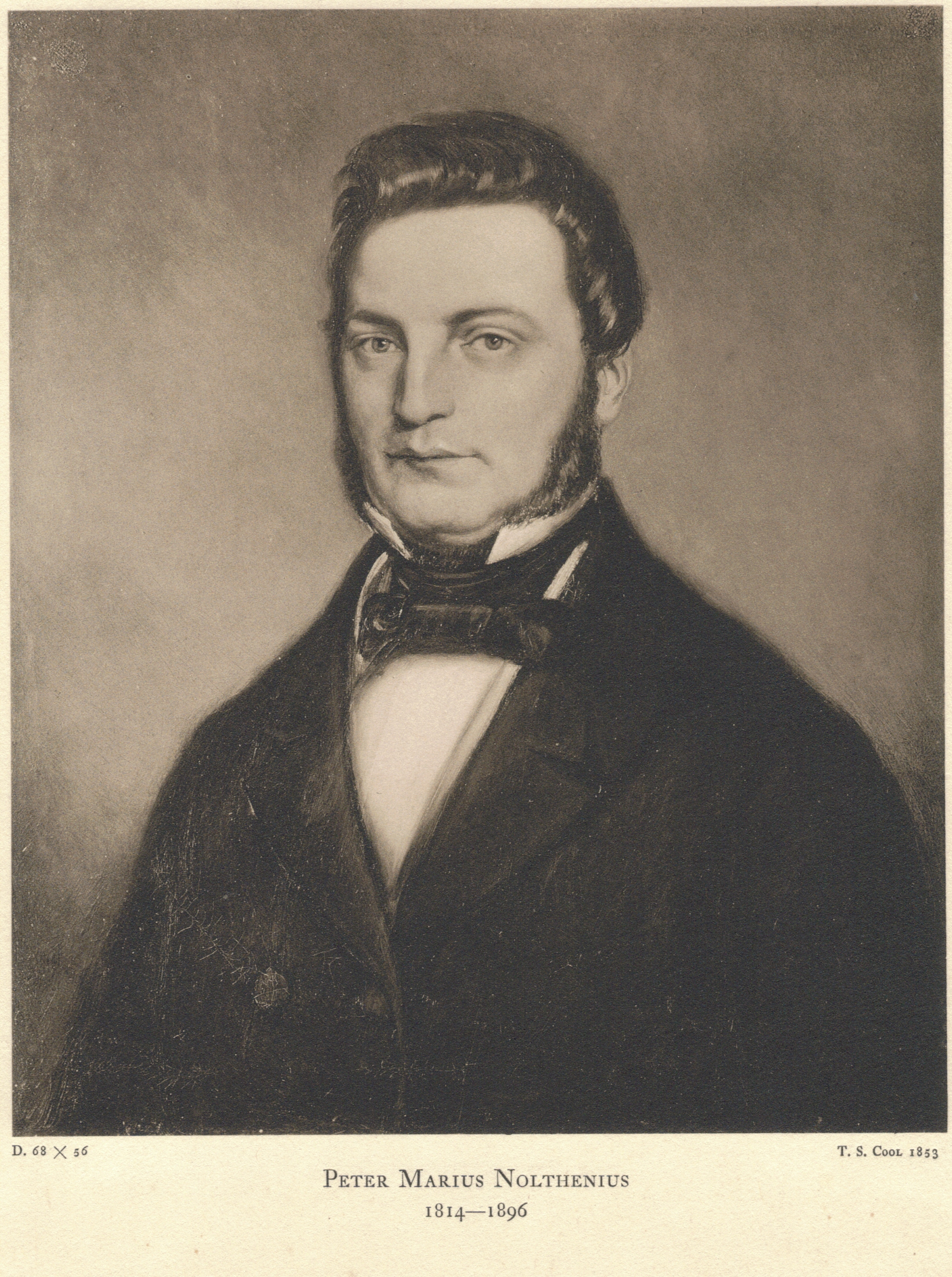
Peter Marius Tutein Nolthenius, 1853

Thomas Simon Cool (12 December 1831 – 29 August 1870) was a Dutch historical and genre painter. He known for "Zelfpotret", a self-portrait, "Boy and Dog in Stable" also known as "A Child feeding a dog", "A peasant girl harvesting", and "Child with Cat (1865)"

He was born at the Hague on 12 December 1831. He studied at the Hague Academy under J. E. J. van den Berg, and Baron Leys, and first distinguished himself by his 'Atala,' exhibited in 1853. He resided in Paris from 1857 to 1860, and in Antwerp from 1861 to 1865, then in Breda as a teacher from 1866 to 1870. He died at Dordrecht on 29 August 1870.
