= Alexis Van Hamme =

Belgian painter

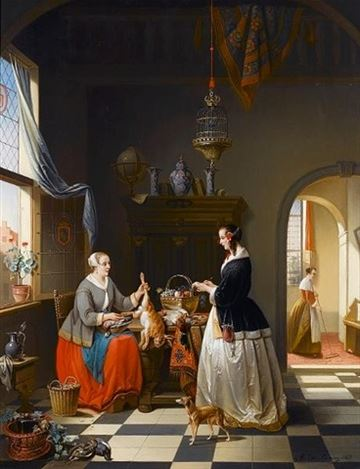
In the Kitchen, 1863

Alexis Van Hamme (12 July 1818, Brussels - 9 October 1875, Brussels) was a Belgian painter; known primarily for historical genre scenes.

== Life and work ==
He studied at the Royal Academy of Fine Arts (Antwerp), with Nicaise De Keyser and Henri Leys; both of whom had a decisive influence on his approach to painting.

His works consist mainly of interior genre scenes, rendered in great detail. Most of them feature 17th-century settings, in the style of the old Dutch masters; especially those known as the fijnschilders. The physical details of his rooms and furnishings owe much to Gerrit Dou.

One of his more specifically historical works, "The Entry of Albert and Isabella into Brussels in 1599", was purchased by King Leopold I.

His works are still commonly featured at auctions, in Europe and the United States. They have been known to fetch prices up to €40,000 (app. 47,000 US Dollars).

Most of his works are privately owned, but some may be seen at the Koninklijke Musea voor Schone Kunsten van België ("The Laceworker") and the Brighton Museum and Art Gallery ("Poultry Seller"). His "Dutch Market" is displayed at the New York Public Library.
