= Charles Venneman =

Belgian painter

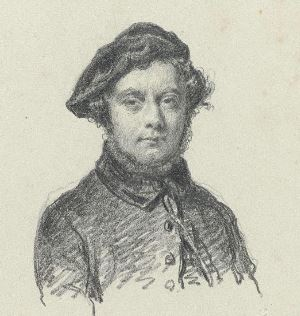
- Self-portrait (date unknown)
- Born: 7 January 1802; Ghent, Belgium
- Died: 22 August 1875 (aged 73); Saint-Josse-ten-Noode, Belgium
- Occupation: painter

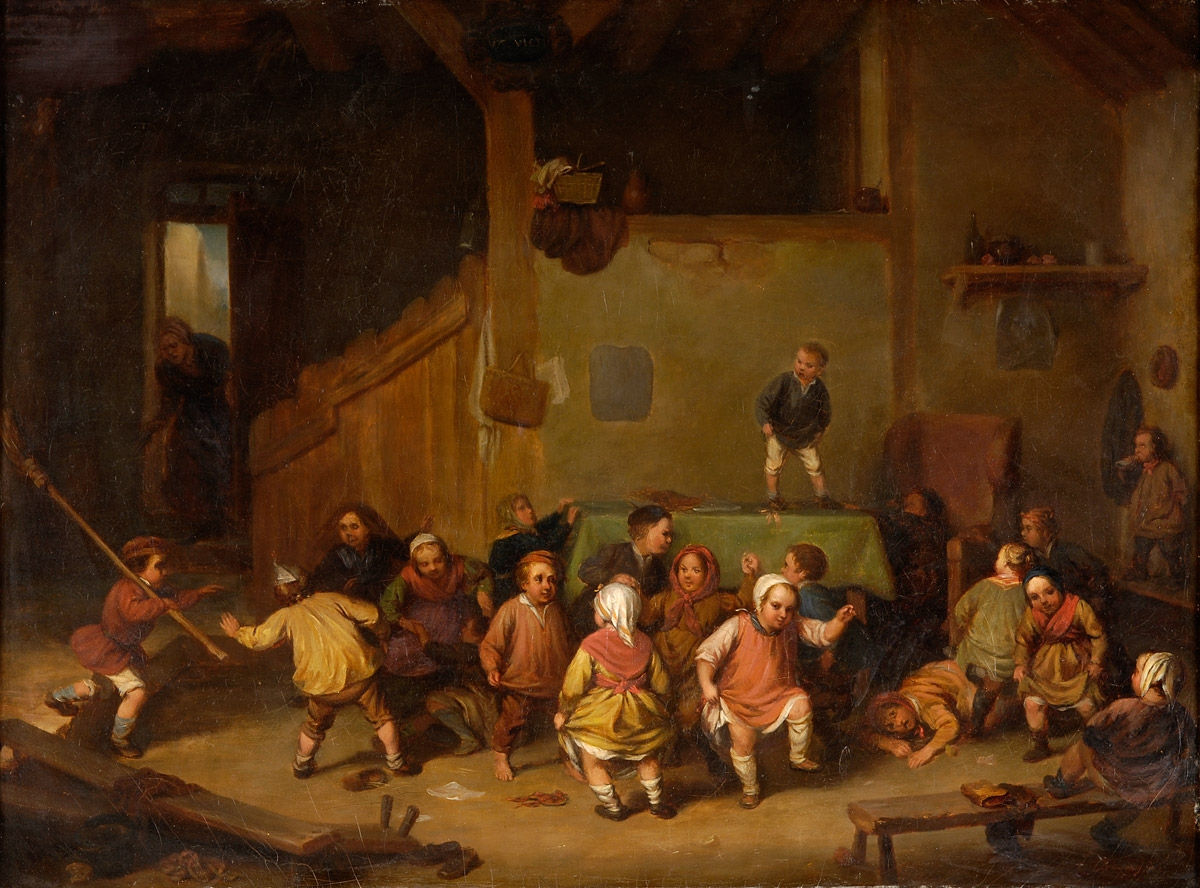
The Village School

Charles Ferdinand Venneman (7 January 1802, Ghent – 22 August 1875, Saint-Josse-ten-Noode) was a Belgian painter who specialized in anecdotal genre scenes, Flemish fairs, and landscapes with animals.

== Biography ==
He received his artistic training from Joseph De Cauwer and Ferdinand de Braekeleer. When he was only eighteen, he took part in the Salon in Ghent. From 1821 to 1836, he made his living doing decorative and furniture painting. After 1836, he was able to devote himself entirely to his art.

He moved to Antwerp in 1837, to work with his former teacher, De Braekeleer. While there, he came under the influence of the works of David Teniers and Adriaen van Ostade; particularly those that depicted villagers and peasants having fun. The resulting works are nostalgic in nature: pleasant, and reminiscent of similar works from the 17th century. A story line is always implied.

During his career, he had successful exhibitions at the Salons in Antwerp and Brussels, as well as in Ghent. His paintings became very popular and were often referred to as "Vennemannekens".

As with many prolific 19th century painters, he used a pitch-based paint that does not preserve color very well; leaving his works less colorful and nuanced than they were originally.

His daughter, Rosa also became a painter, but worked in a more Realistic style.

== Sources ==
- Boon Gallery: Charles Venneman
- Simonis & Buunk: Charles Venneman
- KMSKA, Catalogus van de tentoonstelling "Bruegelland" in Lier
