= Louis Somers =

Belgian footballer

Personal information
- Date of birth: 28 May 1909
- Date of death: 7 February 1965 (aged 55)

International career
Years	Team	Apps	(Gls)
1928–1930	Belgium	4	(0)

Louis Somers (28 May 1909 – 7 February 1965) was a Belgian footballer. He played in four matches for the Belgium national football team from 1928 to 1930.
