= Abry (disambiguation) =

Abry is a French surname.

Abry may also refer to:

- Abry Jones, American American football player
- Léon Abry, Belgian painter
- Patrice Abry, French engineer.
