= Edward Portielje =

Belgian painter

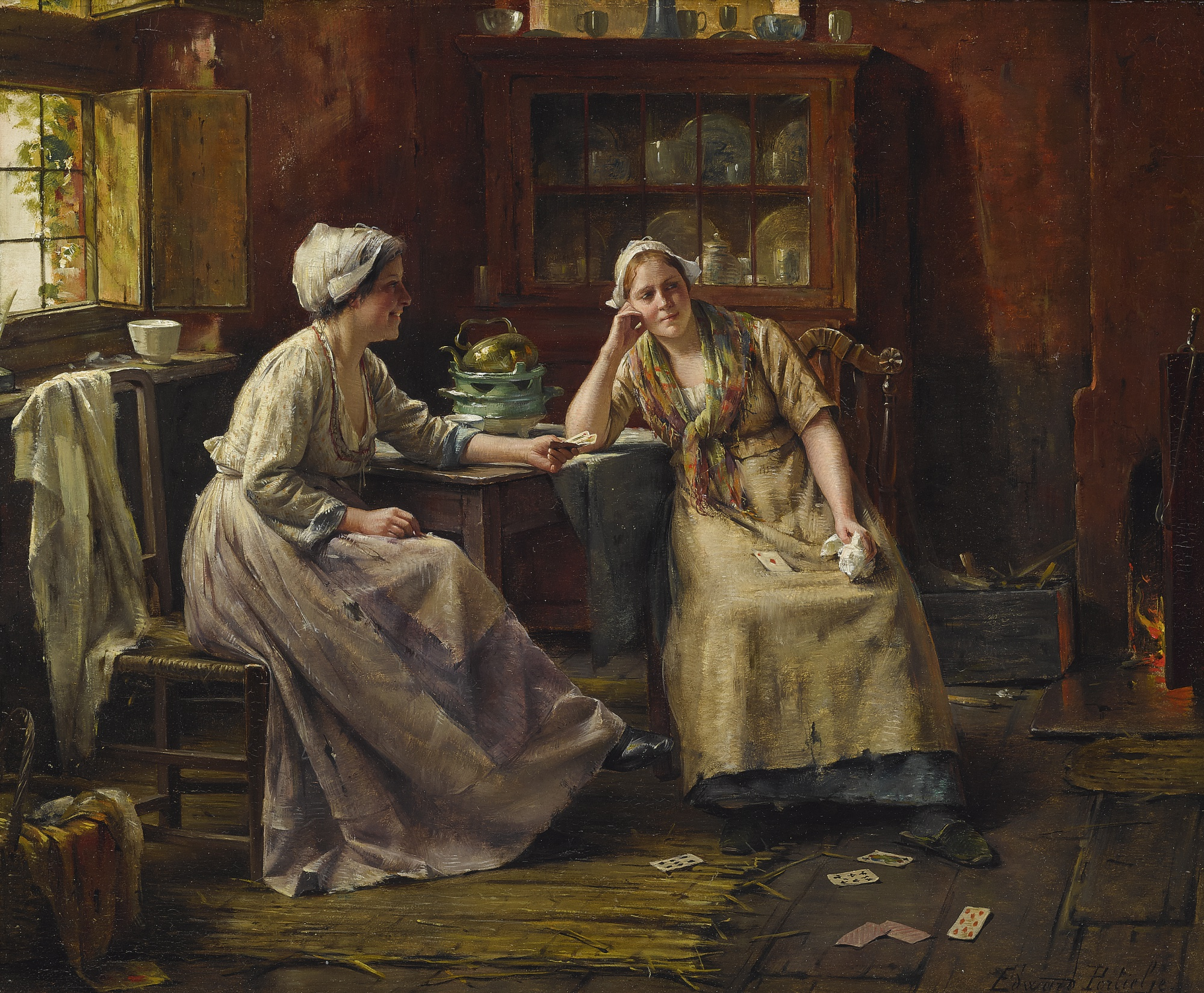
The Winning Hand

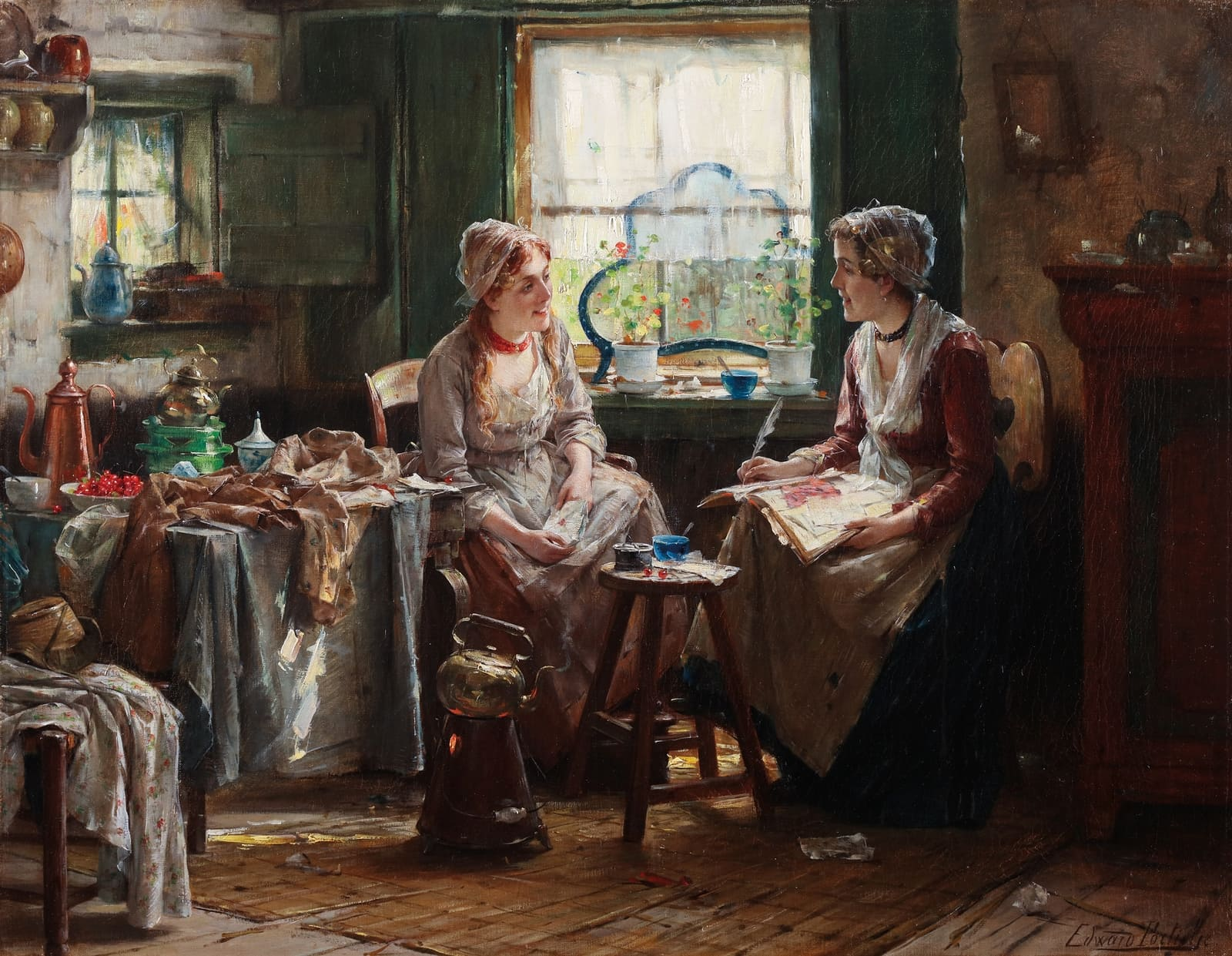
The Letter

Edward Antoon Portielje (8 February 1861, Antwerp – 18 December 1949, Antwerp) was a Belgian genre painter.

== Biography ==
He was born to the painter Jan Portielje and his wife Eulalie (née Lemaire, 1828–1903). His older brother, Gerard, was also a genre painter.

His first art lessons came from his father. Then he attended the Royal Atheneum and, from 1873, took after-school classes at the Royal Academy of Fine Arts with Edward Dujardin. From 1877 to 1881, he was a full-time student at the academy under the tutelage of Polydore Beaufaux, Charles Verlat and Nicaise de Keyser.

He was married twice, first in 1888, to Rosa Hermans 1864-1911), with whom he had a son and secondly in 1923 to Jeanne Marie Cochet. During World War I he lived in Brussels, returning to Antwerp in 1919.

Genre scenes were his speciality, with an occasional portrait or seascape. Much of his inspiration came from the fishing communities in Zeeland. Many of his works are a series of similar interior scenes, created according to the wishes of his agents, Albert D'Huyvetter and Guillaume Campo (1880–1952). These generally consist of a room with a sunny window, occupied by women in traditional costume, engaged in some daily activity. These paintings were very popular, selling throughout Europe and the United States.

In 1894, he worked together with Edouard de Jans and Joseph Dierickx to create murals for the Exposition Internationale d'Anvers.

== Sources ==
- "Portieltje, Edward" in: Dictionnaire des Peintres Belges (Online)
- Patrick Berko, Viviane Berko; Dictionary of Belgian painters born between 1750 & 1875; Brussels : Laconti, 1981 ISBN 978-2-87008-013-9
- Paul Piron, De Belgische beeldende kunstenaars uit de 19de en 20ste eeuw, Art in Belgium, 1999 ISBN 90-76676-01-1
