= Abry =

Abry is a French surname.

Notable people with this surname include:

- Léon Abry (1857–1905), Belgian painter
- Patrice Abry, French engineer

== See also ==
- Abry Jones (born 1991), American football player
