= Jacobus Schoemaker Doyer =

Dutch painter (1792–1867)

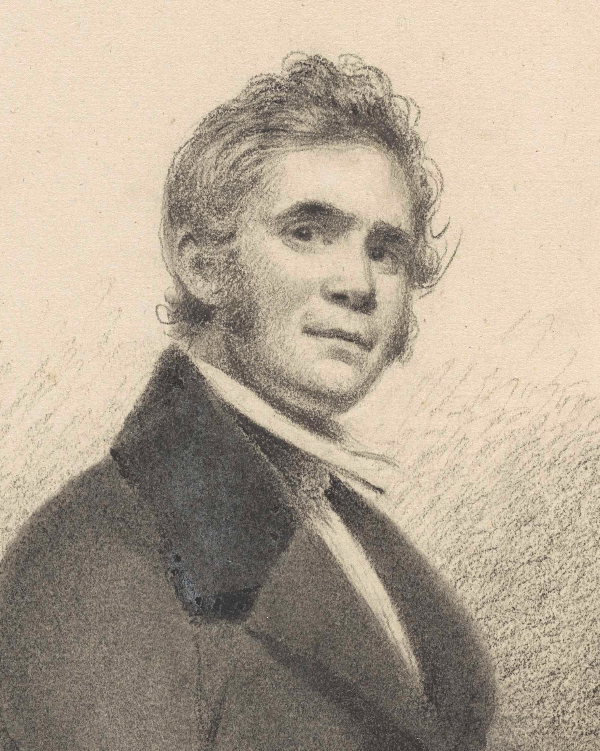
Self-portrait of Doyer

Jacobus Schoemaker Doyer (24 June 1792 – 9 June 1867) was a Dutch painter who specialised in genre art and historical painting.

== Life ==
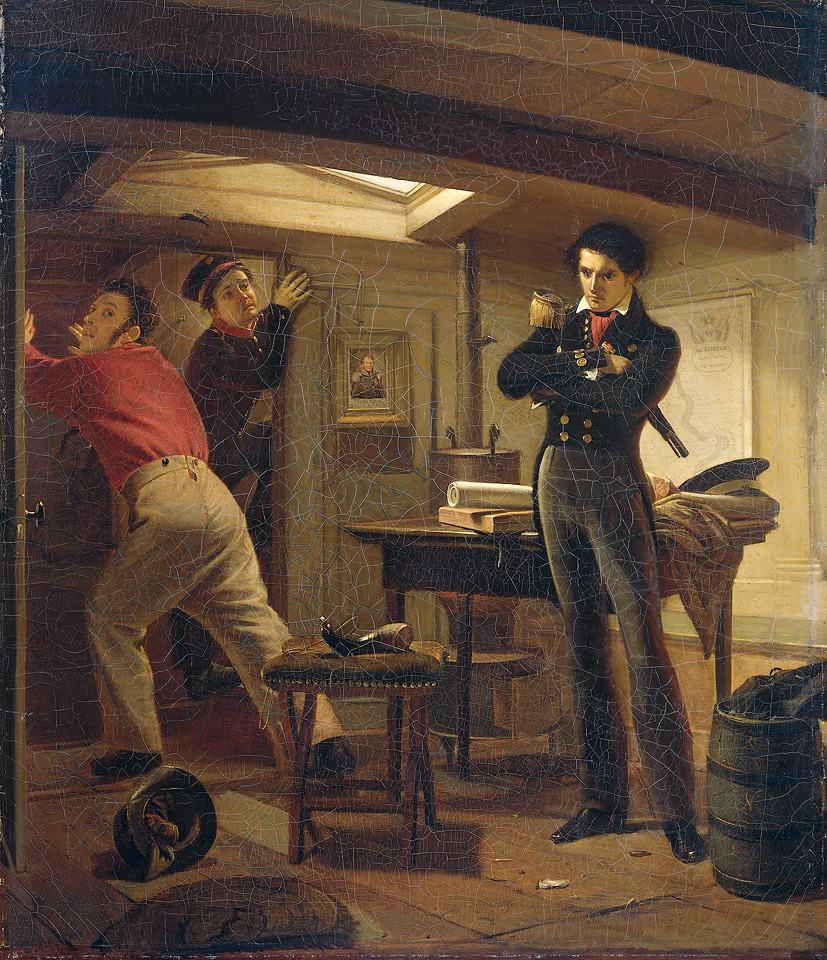
Jan van Speyk Considers Lighting the Powder Keg (1834)

Jacobus Schoemaker Doyer was the son of a pastor. His brother Hendrik (1791-1866) became a publisher in Zwolle, where their parents moved when they were still very young. There, he became close friends with the future Prime Minister Johan Rudolph Thorbecke, who stayed at their home in 1812 while his parents were away on family business. In 1814, he moved to Amsterdam and became a student of Mattheus Ignatius van Bree. Later, he worked with Jurriaan Andriessen, a decorative painter. He continued his studies in Antwerp, then established himself in Amsterdam. In 1823, he spent some time in Kassel and Dresden, studying Italian statuary.

After 1829, he became a lecturer at the Koninklijke Academie voor Beeldende Kunsten, where his students included Christoffel Bisschop and Jacques Carabain. In 1834, he created what are, perhaps, his most familiar works; a set of canvases honoring Jan van Speyk, a Dutch navy lieutenant who blew up his ship and himself, rather than surrender it to Belgian forces. Shortly after, on the recommendation of his friend, Thorbecke, he received a commission to produce a painting depicting the "Vrijwillige Jagers", a volunteer unit from Leiden University that distinguished itself during the Ten Days' Campaign against Belgian revolutionaries. In 2000, a detail from one of his paintings of Van Speyk was used on the Dutch 80 euro cent postage stamp; part of a commemorative set celebrating the 200th anniversary of the Rijksmuseum.

== Personal life ==
Doyer was married to Petronella Evekink and had four sons and two daughters that reached adult age. The couple's sons include colonial administrator and mayor Hendrik Doijer and professor Derk Doyer.
