= Gerard Portielje =

Belgian painter

- Born: 6 February 1856; Antwerp, Belgium
- Died: 18 May 1929 (aged 73); Remich, Luxembourg
- Education: Royal Academy of Fine Arts of Antwerp
- Occupation: Painter
- Parent: Jan Portielje (father)
- Relatives: Edward (brother)

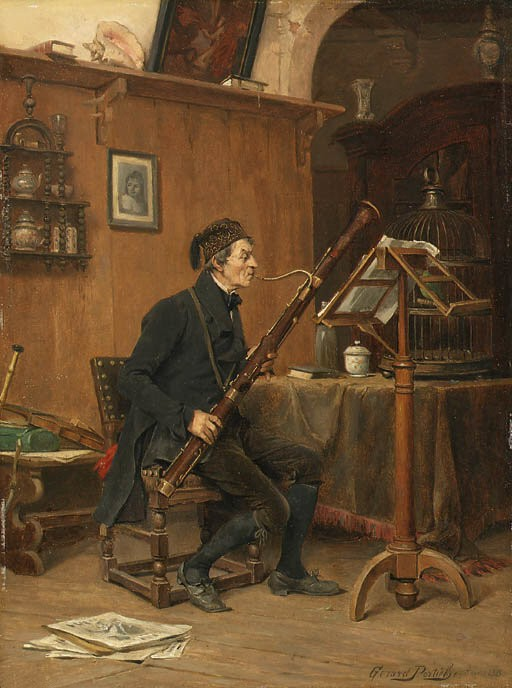
The Bassoon Player

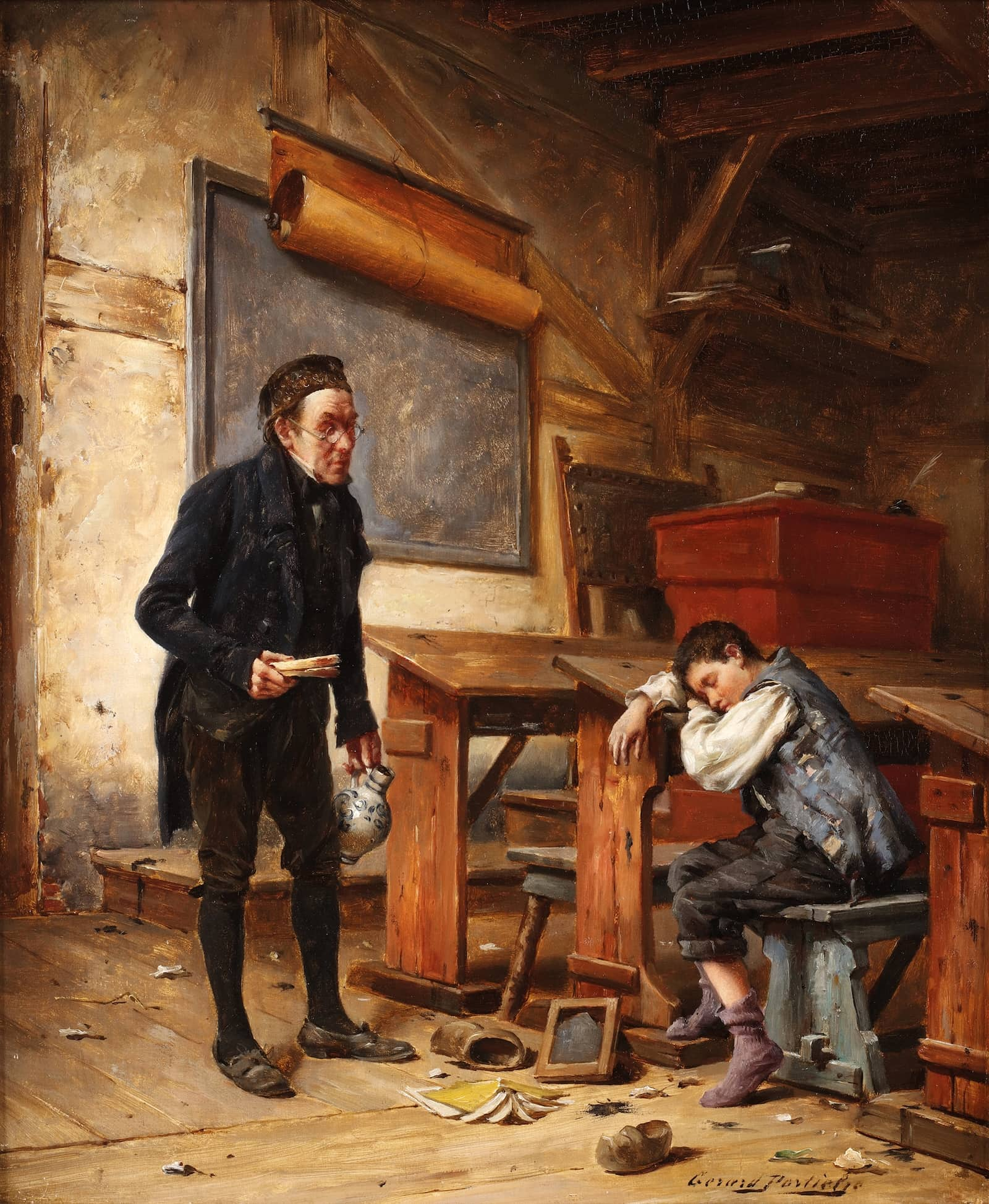
The tired schoolboy, (Belgian collection)

Gerard Jozef Portielje (6 February 1856 – 18 May 1929) was a Belgian painter of genre scenes.

== Life ==
He was born in Antwerp, the son of painter Jan Portielje. His younger brother, Edward, was also a painter. He attended a trade school until 1870, then entered the Royal Academy of Fine Arts of Antwerp. His teachers included Polydore Beaufaux, Jozef Van Lerius and Edward Dujardin.

In 1887, he took a study trip to Vosges and Alsace. In 1898, he visited England and spent some time at Lowestoft. When World War 1 broke out, he returned to England, via Ostend and spent the war years in Worcester Park, Surrey where he produced many landscapes and portrayals of country houses.

For some unknown reason, he did not participate in exhibitions of Belgian artists in exile that were given at Kingston upon Thames and Oxford in 1915. He and his family returned to Belgium in 1919.

From 1898 to 1914 he was an art teacher at the church school on Lange Leemstraat in Antwerp. He took up that position again in 1919 and remained until 1925. He was also a professor of drawing at the Antwerp Academy. He died in 1929 in Remich.

== Work ==
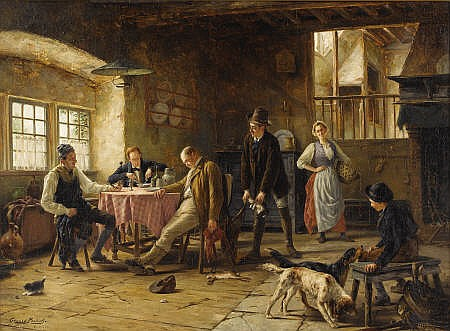
The Joke

Portielje specialized in genre scenes in a variety of social settings, generally filled with people who might be described as "characters". They are often humorous (occasionally suggestive), and there is usually a sense that something is about to happen. The clothing and accessories point to the early nineteenth century, rather than his own times. He is particularly noted for his attention to fine detail. His paintings were usually priced according to the number of people they contained.

He worked in close cooperation with many well-known art dealers in New York and London. One of those dealers, Albert D'Huyvetter, often had him produce paintings in collaboration with other artists.

He was commissioned to create posters and brochures for the 300th Anniversary of Anthony van Dyck's birth and designed advertisements for "Elixir d'Anvers", an herbal liqueur with purported medicinal properties.
