= Jan Portielje =

Dutch-Belgian painter

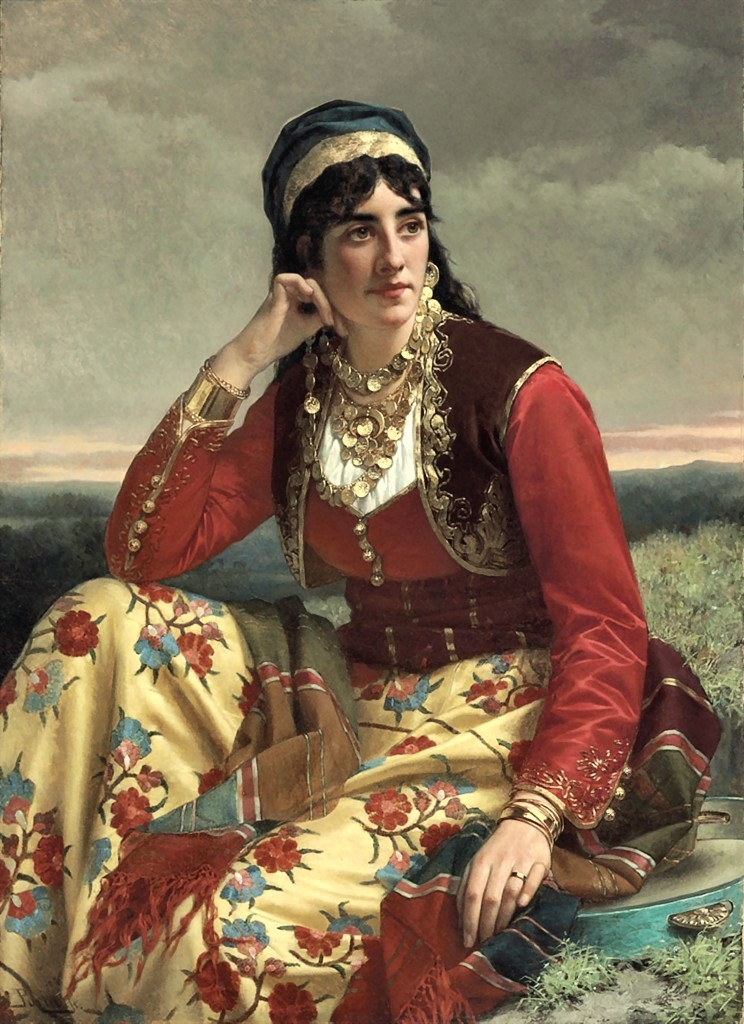
An East European Beauty

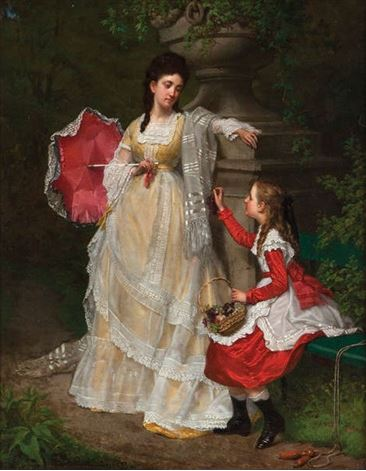
A Mother and Child Sharing Grapes

Jan Frederik Pieter Portielje (20 April 1829, Amsterdam – 6 February 1908, Antwerp) was a Dutch-Belgian painter of genre scenes and portraits; mostly of women.

== Biography ==
He was the tenth of eleven children born to Gerrit Portielje, a bookseller, and his wife, Jacoba Zeegers. From 1842 to 1849, he studied at the Koninklijke Akademie van Beeldende Kunsten with Valentijn Bing and Jan Braet von Überfeldt. He made several extended stays in Paris from 1851 to 1853 and worked as a portraitist, with a large clientele in both Brussels and Antwerp, where he eventually settled.

In 1853, he married Eulalie Lemaire (1828–1903), and they had five children; two of whom, Gerard and Edward, also became painters.

His genre pictures featured elegant women in gardens or luxurious interiors. Some were dressed in Orientalist style. He also collaborated with other painters, such as Eugène Rémy Maes and Frans Lebret (1820–1909), who provided the backgrounds and foreground details for his portraits.

His paintings proved to be especially popular in the United States and he worked closely with several well known art dealers; such as Albert D'Huyvetter and his son (also named Albert), natives of Antwerp who were based in New York City, and the Prinz Brothers of Chicago.

He had a major showing at the Exposition Internationale d'Anvers (1894), and was a regular participant in the Exhibition of Living Masters from 1848 to 1888. Outside of Belgium and the Netherlands, his works may be seen at the Alfred East Art Gallery in Kettering and the Bendigo Art Gallery in Victoria.

== Sources ==
- "Jan Frederik Pieter Portielje" in: Biografisch portaal van Nederland (Online)
- "Jan Frederik Pieter Portielje" in: Pieter A. Scheen: Lexicon Nederlandse Beeldende Kunstenaars 1750–1950 (Online)
