= Valentijn Bing =

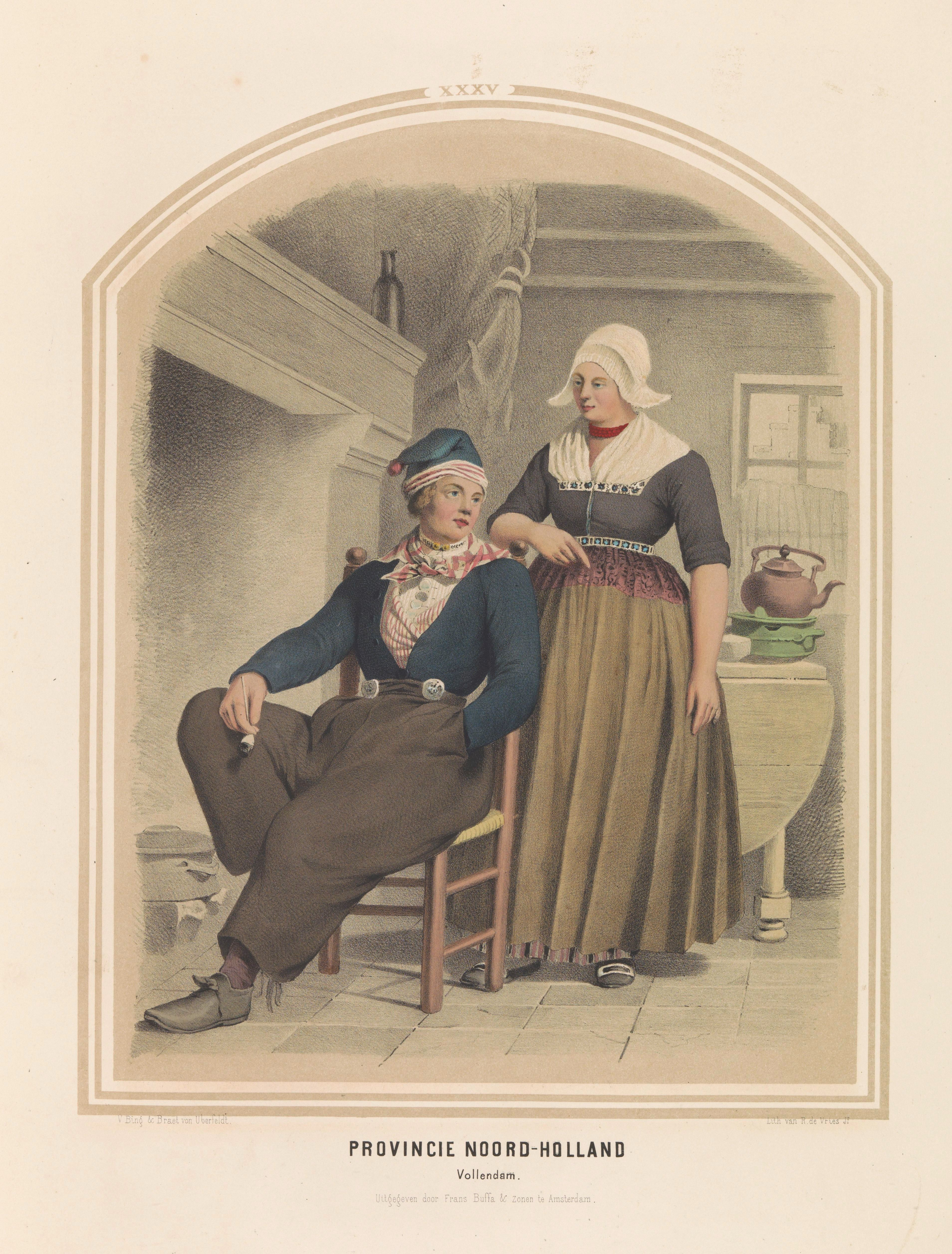
Couple in the Traditional Costumes of Volendam

Valentijn Bing (22 April 1812 – 28 January 1895) was a Dutch painter, illustrator, and lithographer. His works included genre scenes, religious art, portraits, and cityscapes.

== Life and work ==
Born in Amsterdam, he was the son of Andreas Christoph Bing, a merchant, and his English wife, Mary Ann née Barton. After completing secondary school, he studied at the Koninklijke Akademie, where his primary instructor was Jan Adam Kruseman.

He made his entry into the art world by participating in the Exhibition of Living Masters. In 1839, he became a member of Arti et Amicitiae. From 1843, he was a teacher at the Akademie. For his 25th anniversary, in 1868, he was awarded a silver medal by Johann Wilhelm Kaiser, Director of the Akademie's engraving school. His most familiar students include Jacques Carabain, Adrianus David Hilleveld, Jan Portielje, and Marie Wandscheer.

Together with his fellow lithographer, Jan Braet von Überfeldt, he wrote and illustrated Nederlandsche kleederdragten, naar de natuur geteekend (1857), on the traditional costumes of the Netherlands. They also produced two instructional books on drawing, in 1863 and 1866.

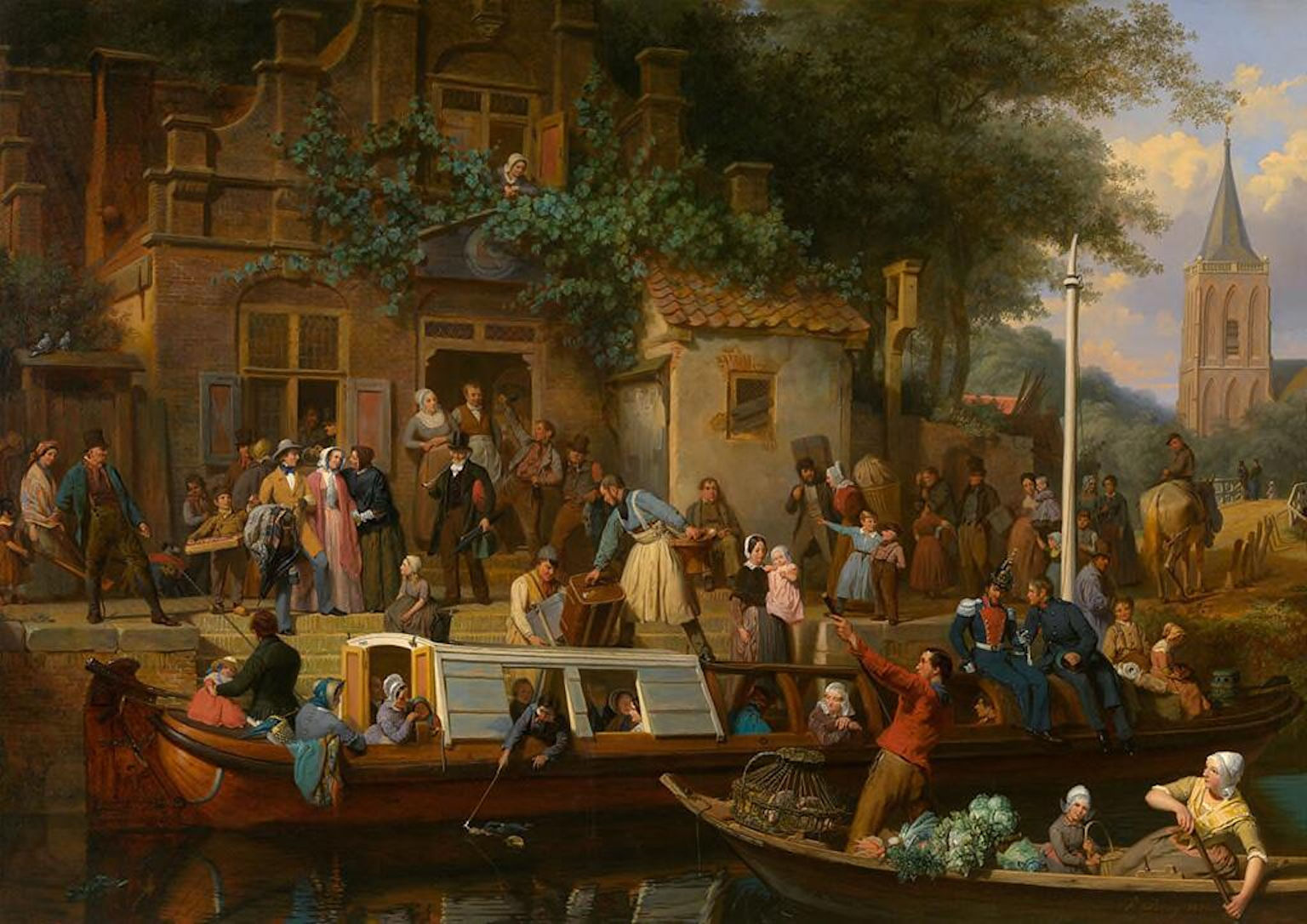
Canal Boat in Front of the Tavern "Het Wapen van Utrecht"

He remained unmarried and lived with his sisters in Amsterdam, until he was fifty-one. That year, he married Antonia Johanna Heiligers (1835–1897), from Bleskensgraaf, who was thirteen years his junior. They had several children. In 1891, they moved to Bleskensgraaf, but stayed there for only a short time, then moved to Nieuwpoort, where he died, aged eighty-two.
