= Edward Dujardin =

Belgian painter

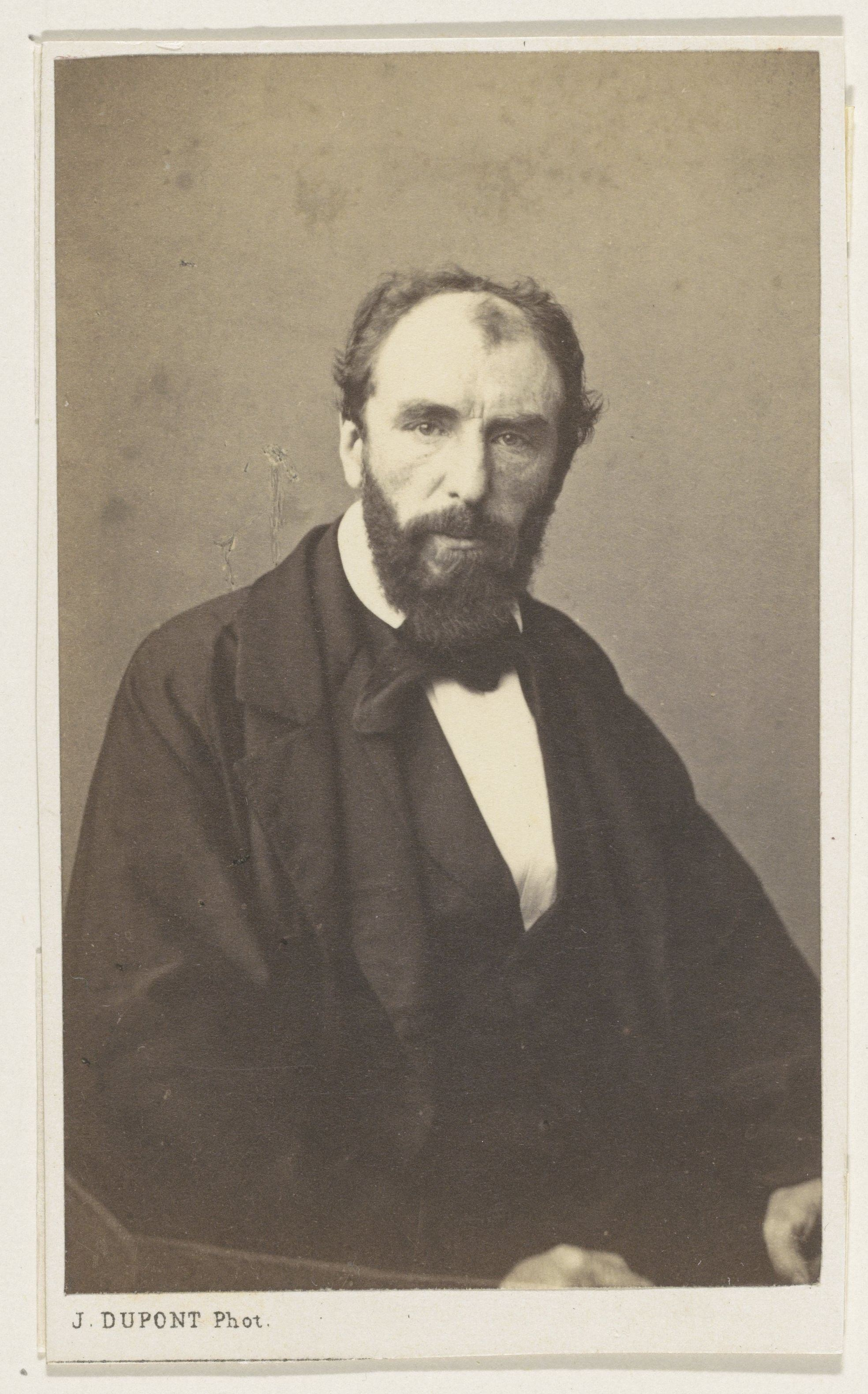
Edward Dujardin (1861)

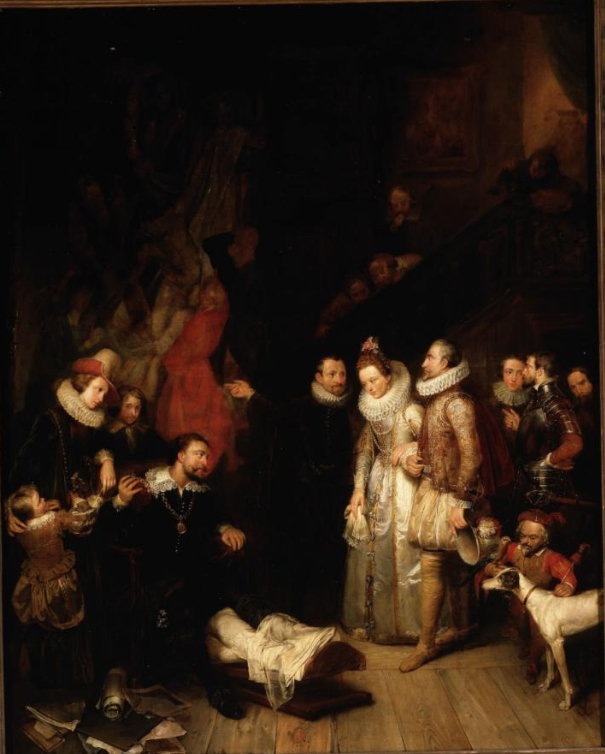
Albert and Isabella Visit the Workshop of Peter Paul Rubens

Edward Dujardin (29 November 1817, Antwerp – 21 May 1889, Antwerp) was a Belgian painter and art teacher.

== Biography ==
He began his studies at the Royal Academy of Fine Arts (Antwerp), under Gustaf Wappers. From 1841, he taught figure drawing and placement at the academy, a position he held until his death. He also authored two works on the subject: "Distribution, legs and movements of the human body, as taught in the Royal Academy of Antwerp" (1871), and "The proportions or measures of comparison of the most special antique statues and Greek statues of women, with four plates" (1888). His notable students included Henri Bource, Alfred Elsen, Frans Mortelmans, André Plumot, Edward Portielje and Gerard Portielje.

He painted historical events, Biblical scenes, and portraits, and was in great demand for decorating public celebrations. The novelist, Hendrik Conscience, was a good friend of his and he provided illustrations for several of his works, including The Lion of Flanders.

In 1846 Dujardin traveled to Italy with Eugène Van Havre and made an extensive report about his whereabouts. He also published a version of 'De Leeuw van Vlaenderen' on his own, that was dedicated to Eugène van Havre, mayor of Brasschaat.

He was married to Theresia Maria Van Arendonck; sister of the sculptor, Jan Van Arendonck. They had two daughters. Their daughter Alida married the architect, Jules Bilmeyer who built several churches in Antwerp.

=== Flemish ===
Unlike many of his colleagues at the academy, he supported Flemish movement and was a board member of "Voor Tael en Kunst", an organization that promoted cultural and entertainment activities. During the early 1850s, they became associated with Catholicism and disbanded.

In 1855, he was one of the co-founders of the magazine De Vlaemsche School, which served as a successor to "Voor Tael en Kunst". He also became involved in the Meetingpartij, a political organization that expressed dissatisfaction over the results of Belgian independence. From 1872 to 1876, and again from 1884 to 1888, he represented the party in the Antwerp Provincial Council.

== Sources ==
- "Edouard DUJARDIN, illustrator Hendrik Conscience" by E. H. G. Van Cauwenberghe @ Academia; a detailed biography.
- J.F. Buyck, Catalogus schilderijen 19de en 20ste eeuw, Koninklijk Museum voor Schone Kunsten Antwerpen, Antwerp, 1977.
