= Egmond aan Zee =

- Village / seaside resort
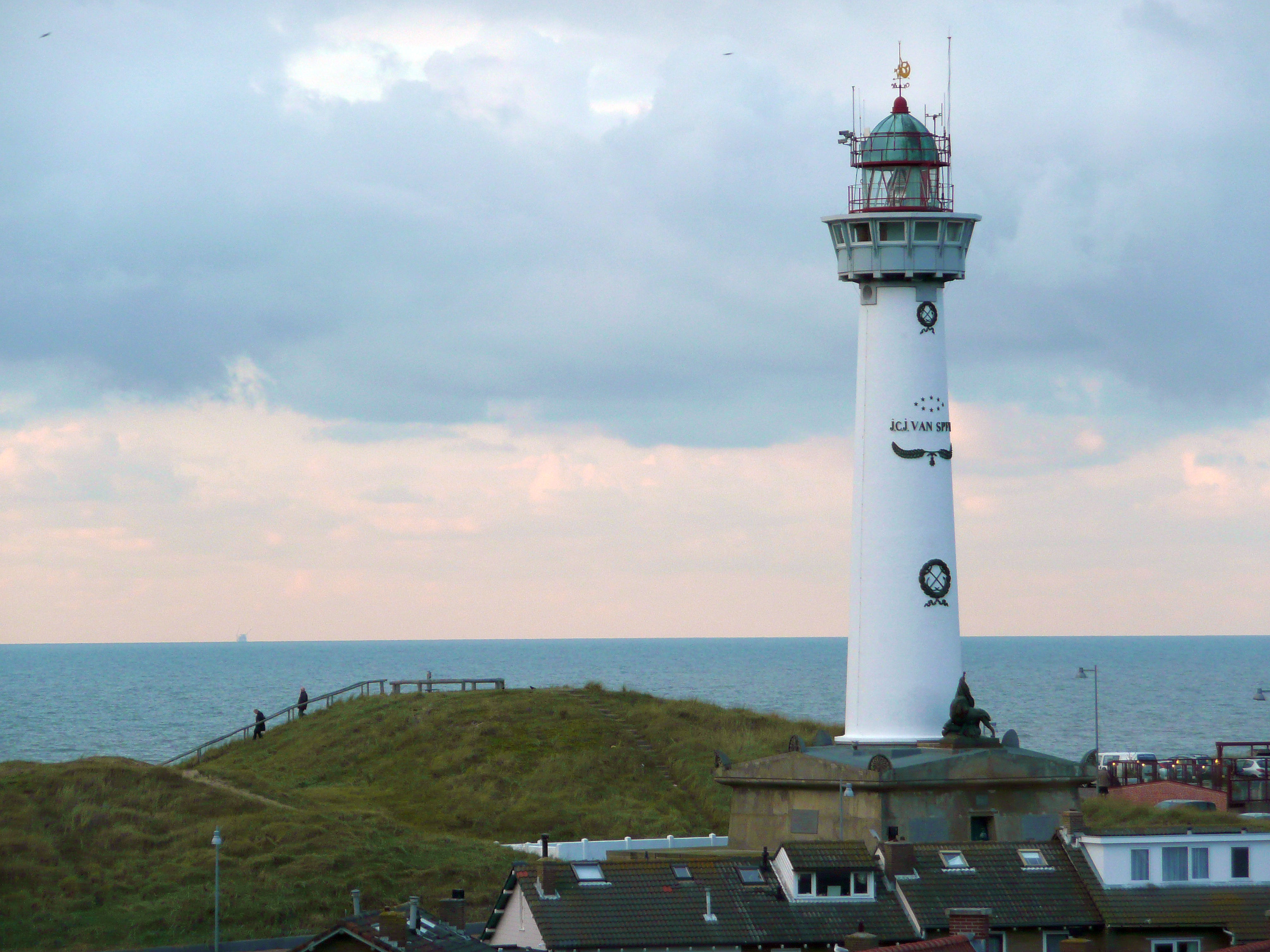
- J.C.J. van Speijk Lighthouse

- Flag Coat of arms

- Location in the Netherlands Location in the province of North Holland in the Netherlands
- Coordinates: 52°37′N 4°37′E
- Country: Netherlands
- Province: North Holland
- Municipality: Bergen

Area
  - Total: 1.94 km^{2} (0.75 sq mi)
- Elevation: 10 m (33 ft)

Population (2025)
  - Total: 4,535
  - Density: 2,340/km^{2} (6,050/sq mi)
- Time zone: UTC+1 (CET)
  - Summer (DST): UTC+2 (CEST)
- Postal code: 1931
- Dialing code: 072

Egmond aan Zee (Dutch pronunciation: [ˌɛxmɔnt aːn ˈzeː]) is a village on the North Sea coast in the Dutch province of North Holland. It is a part of the municipality of Bergen, about 9 km west of Alkmaar.

Egmond aan Zee was a separate municipality until 1978, when it merged with Egmond-Binnen and Egmond aan den Hoef to form the new municipality Egmond. In turn, Egmond was amalgamated into Bergen on 1 January 2001.

== History ==
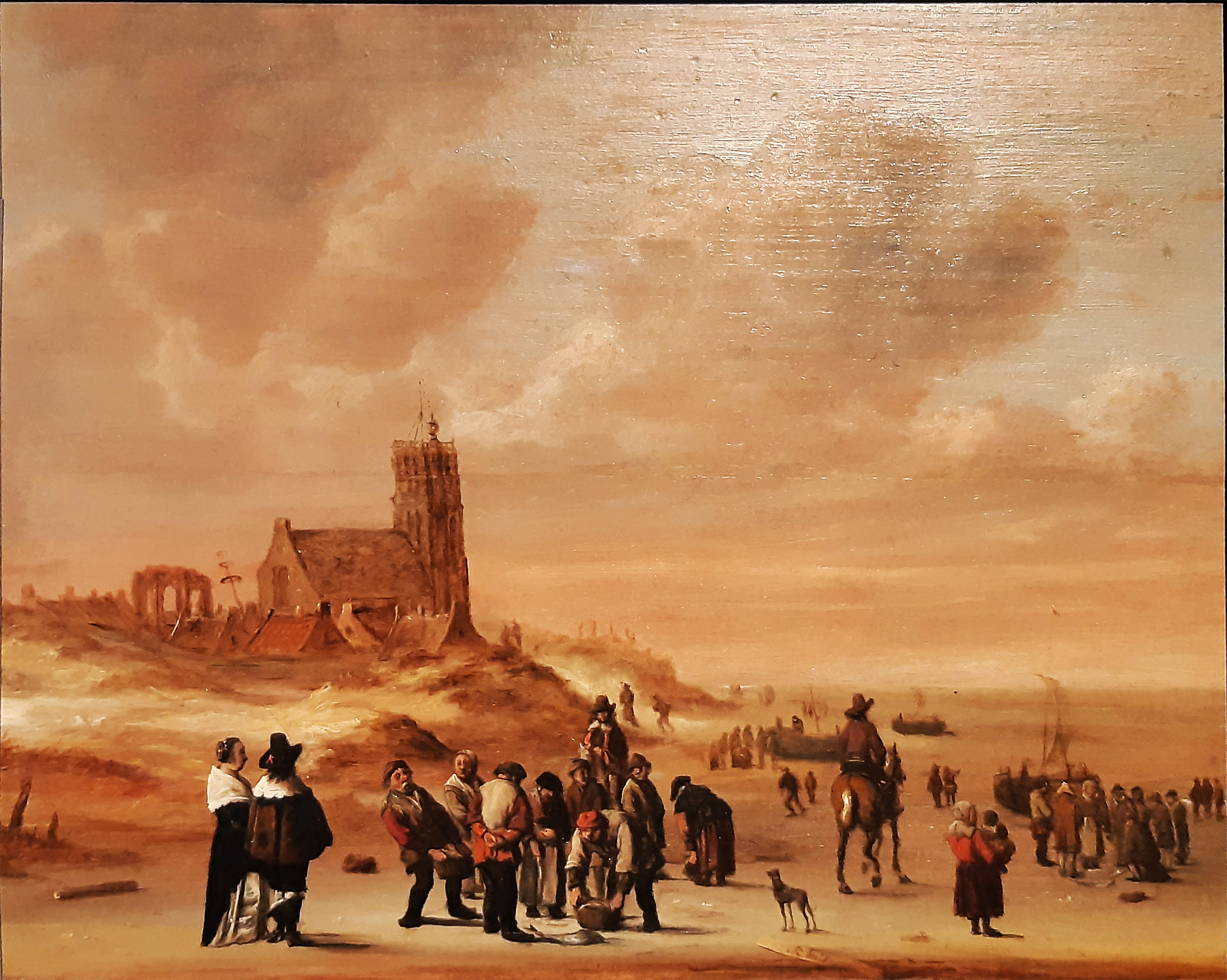
«The beach at Egmond aan Zee» by Cornelis Beelt, 1602-1612

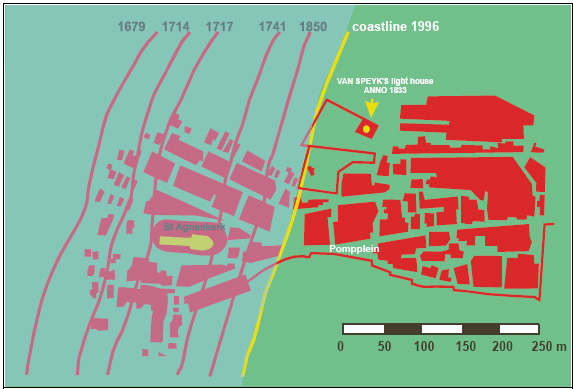
Beach erosion at Egmond over the centuries

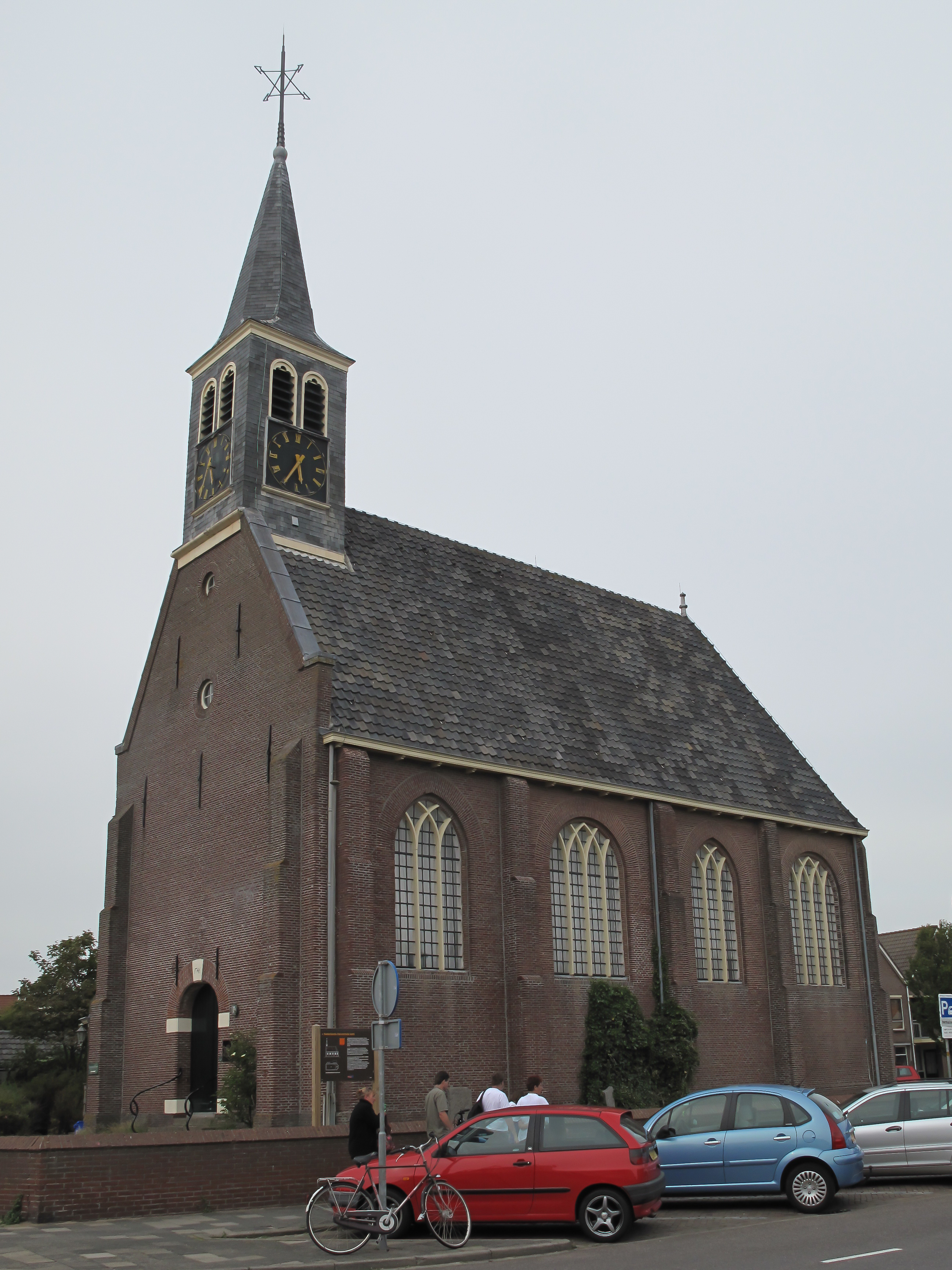
Egmond aan Zee, church

This best-known of the three villages of Egmond was formed in the coastal dunes. According to legend, it was founded around 977. Settlers in this area have battled the sea since the first settlements. During the All Saints' Flood of 1570, some 50 houses disappeared into the sea. And in November 1741, the sea swallowed 36 houses, the church, and its tower.

Apart from being dangerous, the sea also provided the people of Egmond food and work, as most inhabitants of Egmond were fishermen. Quite a few sights in Egmond remind one of this; for instance, the "fishermen-houses", which are tiny houses near the sea where fishermen used to live. Another sight is a fishermen monument and the "Prins Hendrik Stichting", a stately building named after a Dutch prince that used to house retired fishermen. The Egmond museum paints a picture of what living in Egmond used to be like.

Egmond aan Zee has been a popular seaside resort since the beginning of the 20th century, when it was well known for its healthy and clear sea air. Children came over to stay in one of the many "koloniehuizen" (colony houses), which were sanatorium-like institutions often run by charities and churches. The center of attention in Egmond is certainly the Jan van Speijk Lighthouse, built in 1834 and named after Dutch sea captain Jan van Speijk.

== Art and the artists' colony ==
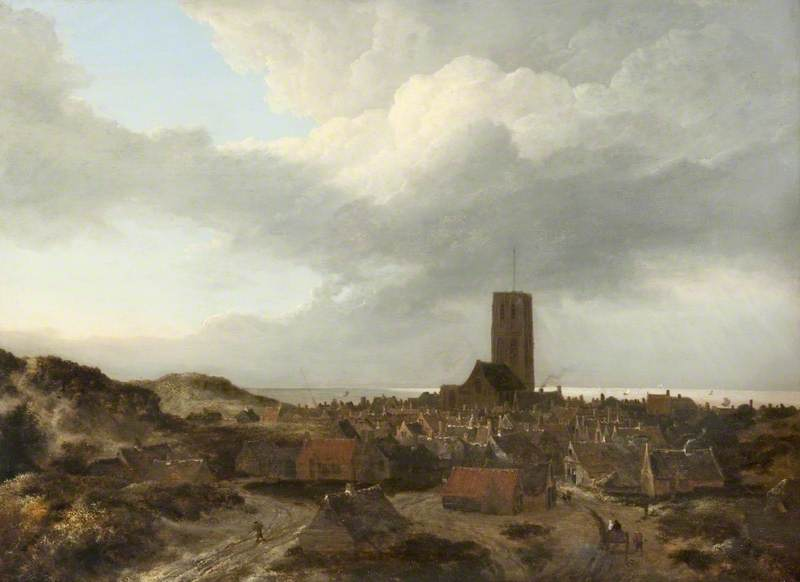
Jacob van Ruisdael - A View of Egmond aan Zee, circa 1647-1652

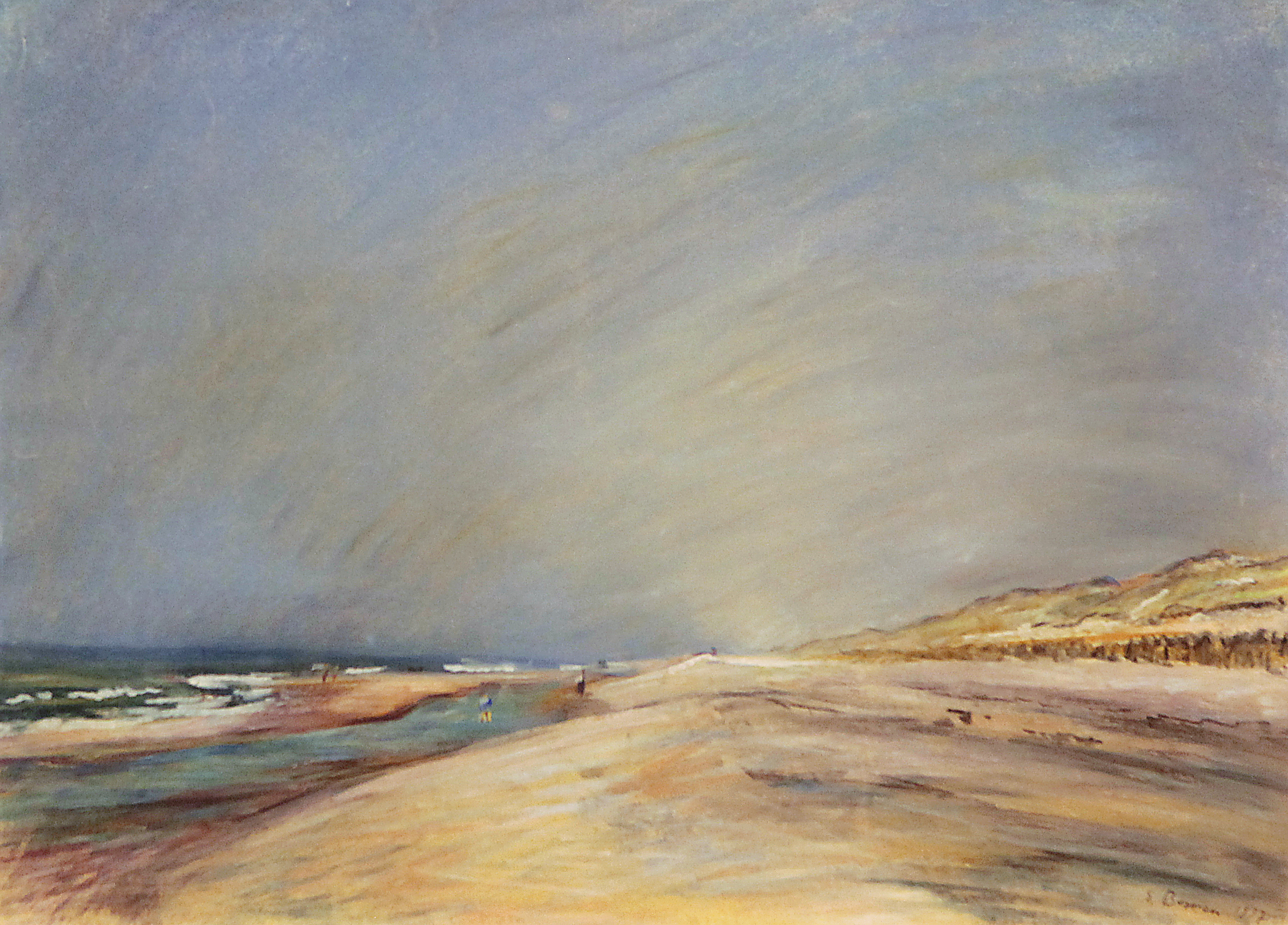
Erwin Bowien - Dutch coast Strand in Egmont in summer, 1937

Historically, Egmond aan Zee had been a popular subject for artists such as Cornelis Beelt, Jacob van Ruisdael and Erwin Bowien who was a resident of nearby Egmond aan den Hoef during the Nazi era.

The rural Dutch villages of Egmond aan Zee, Egmond aan den Hoef, and Egmond Binnen played host to a small artists' colony beginning in 1881 when the American artist George Hitchcock settled there. Walter MacEwen, also American, painted there from 1883 to 1885. Another American, Gari Melchers, arrived in 1884. Melchers continued there for 25 years, recording the people and the rural environment. See Joseph G. Dreiss, Gari Melchers; His Works in the Belmont Collection, Charlottesville, University Press of Virginia, 1984, pp. 11ff.

== Statistics ==
In 2001, the town of Egmond aan Zee had 5086 inhabitants. The built-up area of the town was 0.85 km^{2}, and contained 2490 residences.

== Events ==
The Egmond Half Marathon (Dutch: Egmond Halve Marathon) is an annual half marathon race over 21.1 kilometres that has been staged since 1973. The competition normally takes place in early January. Sections of the road race cross along the beach and sand dunes of the village, situated on the North Sea coast. The 2010 edition of the race was cancelled due to poor weather conditions, marking the first break in the race's history.

From 1995, Egmond aan Zee has hosted the Finder Darts Masters, a yearly major darts tournament that features players for the British Darts Organisation circuit, and formally sanctioned by the World Darts Federation. It is usually held in December, at the Hotel Zuiderduin, and is traditionally the last tournament held before the World Championship.

== Cultural references ==
Egmond aan Zee is the setting of part of the novel The Tree and the Vine (1954) by Dola de Jong.

== Notable people ==
- Bibi de Vries, politician
