= Jan van Speijk =

Royal Netherlands Navy officer (1802–1831)

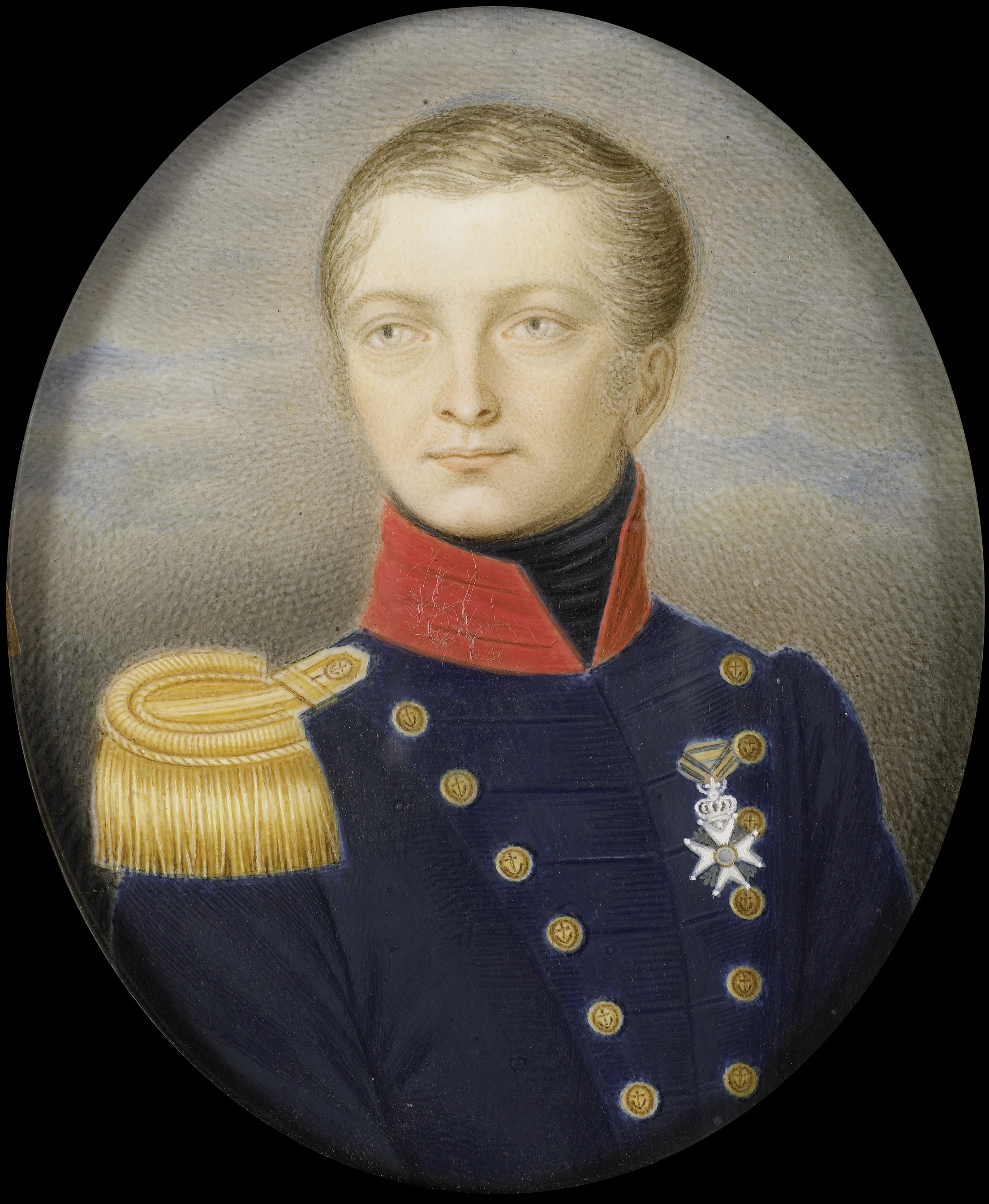
- Portrait by Joannes Antonius Augustinus Pluckx, 1820–1837
- Born: 31 January 1802; Amsterdam, Batavian Commonwealth
- Died: 5 February 1831 (aged 29); Antwerp, Belgium
- Burial place: Nieuwe Kerk, Amsterdam
- Military career
- Allegiance: Netherlands
- Branch: Royal Netherlands Navy
- Service years: 1820–1831
- Rank: Lieutenant commander
- Wars: First Bone War; Java War; Belgian Revolution
- Awards: Military Order of William

Lieutenant-Commander Jan Carel Josephus van Speijk (31 January 1802 – 5 February 1831), also known as van Speyk, was a Royal Netherlands Navy officer who became a public hero in the Netherlands for his opposition to the Belgian Revolution.

== Early life ==
Born in Amsterdam in the Batavian Commonwealth on 13 January 1802, van Speijk was orphaned at the age of 10. When he was 18 years old, he joined the Royal Netherlands Navy after having been refused once prior and served in the Dutch East Indies from 1823 to 1825. He engaged in anti-piracy operations in Bangka Island and Java, which earned him the nickname "Terror of the Bandits" (Dutch: Schrik der Roovers). Van Speijk also served in the First Bone War while in the East Indies.

== Belgian Revolution and death ==
When the Belgian Revolution began, van Speijk was given command of Gunboat No. 2., a small sailing ship armed with one large cannon and multiple smaller ordinances. He was tasked with inspecting all ships going to and from Antwerp since that city had joined the rebellion in early October 1830. Van Speijk participated in the bombardment of Antwerp on October 27. Van Speijk despised the Belgian independence movement, and he had written in an 1830 letter he would rather die "than become an infamous Brabander".

On February 5, 1831, Van Speijk was ordered to sail to Oosterweel to inspect ship cargoes, as he had done many times earlier that winter before having to leave as the Scheldt had frozen over. However, due to a strong northwest wind and a malfunctioning anchor, his ship drifted to the shore on the Scheldt where it crashed into the shore near Fort Sint Laurentius, where an angry mob of Antwerp workers and the soldiers of the De Gorter volunteer corps (under the command of Captain Grégoire) approached the ship. The role of the soldiers in the storming of the ship was limited, however. According to the Dutch fusilier Johannes van Oostendorp, there was a truce in effect at that time. In his eyewitness account, he describes how "the mob" attacked the ship without the support of the soldiers. A number of them reportedly jumped onto his ship to seize the flag. Following this, Van Speijk allegedly went to the cabin, supposedly to retrieve some papers. By sticking his smoldering cigar into a barrel of gunpowder, he then blew up the ship. According to legend, he is said to have spoken the historic last words: "...and become an infamous Brabander? I'd rather be blown up then!" However, a number of sources have cast doubt on the veracity of these words. His supposed last words originate from a letter to his cousin on December 19, 1830, in which he wrote about preferring to blow himself and his ship up rather than surrender to the Belgians, modeling himself after Reinier Claeszen, a war hero during the Eighty Years' War who had similarly blown his ship up to prevent it falling into the hands of the Spanish in 1606.

Historian Ronald Prud'homme van Reine posits a different story, claiming that the soldiers belonged to an Orangist volunteer corps and that their commander must have ordered them to offer protection to Van Speijk against the workers who were standing on the quay. Van Reine states that Van Speijk must have misunderstood the soldiers' intentions.

Twenty-eight of his 31 crewmen also perished in the blast. At least three to seven Belgians, including the two officers who had gone on board, died during the explosion, and the true total has been estimated in the dozens.

== Legacy ==
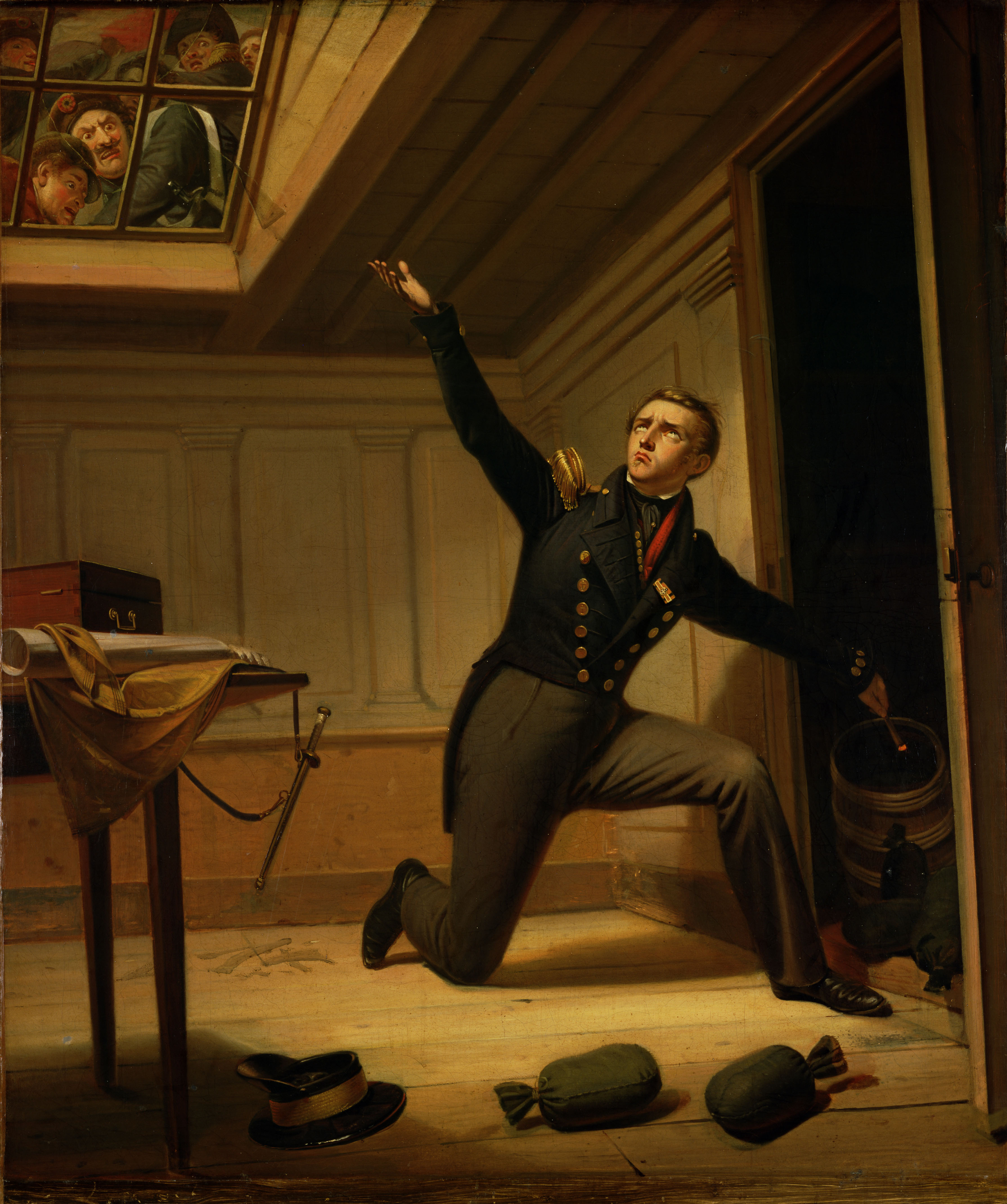
Van Speyk in the ship's powder room (Jacobus Schoemaker Doyer)

While his act had been of no military value, Van Speijk soon became a national hero in the northern Netherlands. Van Speijk's self-sacrifice garnered great admiration in the fledgling Kingdom of the Netherlands, conveniently overlooking the sacrifice of 27 of his crew members. It provided a significant boost to nationalist sentiments, which were already under pressure due to the Belgian uprising. Numerous poems of praise were written, commemorative medals were struck, and monuments were erected. At the front, an order of the day was read to all troops, in which Van Speijk's deed was praised. A three-day period of mourning was declared throughout the kingdom. Funds were raised for a national monument. In 1832, his remains were buried in the Nieuwe Kerk in Amsterdam, where the remains of Dutch naval hero Michiel de Ruyter are also interred. Van Speijk is regarded as a naval hero in the Netherlands. This resulted in a royal decree (Koninklijk Besluit number 81, 11 February 1833) issued by King William I pronouncing that as long as the Dutch Navy exists there will always be a ship named van Speijk to preserve his memory.

Seven ships of the Royal Netherlands Navy ships have carried this name, the latest being HNLMS Van Speijk (F828) of 1994, a Karel Doorman-class frigate. Her predecessor, the frigate HNLMS Van Speijk (F802), launched in 1965, was the lead ship of her own class. The mast of van Speijk's ship is preserved at the Royal Netherlands Naval College. For his actions related to the bombardment of Antwerp, as captain of Gunboat Number 2, van Speijk was decorated with the Knight's Cross (4th class) of the Military Order of William. A national memorial in his honour is located at the J.C.J. van Speijk Lighthouse in Egmond aan Zee.

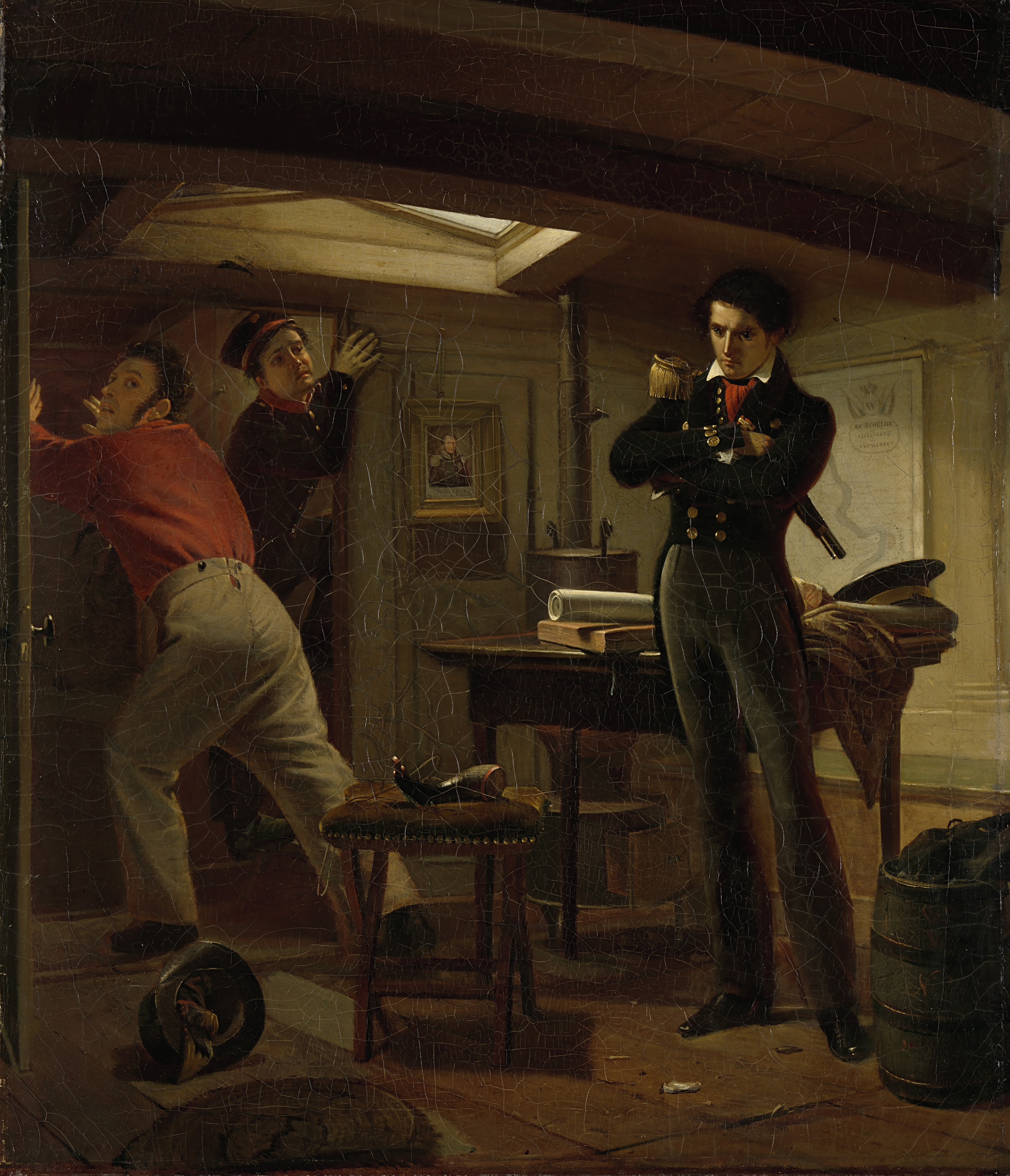
Jan van Speijk Debating whether to Set Fire to the Gunpowder (1834) by Jacobus Schoemaker Doyer

As early as 1833, Zacharias Hendrik van der Feen had published a critical book De zelfopoffering van J. C. J. van Speyk aan den Bijbel getoetst: eenebijdrage tot staving dat de gereformeerde leer de zelfmoord noch contört, noch begunstigt, noch verdedigt. Yet, until the second half of the nineteenth century, challenging Jan van Speijk's heroic status remained taboo within the Netherlands, after which the number of critics increased. Multatuli, for example, questioned whether Jan van Speijk's self-sacrifice was actually an act of patriotism and named his canary after him around 1876.

Historian Ronald Prud'homme van Reine relativized Van Speijk's heroism in a publication and sought instead a psychological explanation for his act. Prud'homme described Van Speijk as a depressed and insecure young man, who was strongly fascinated by the king and by the ideal of naval heroism.
