= Jacques Carabain =

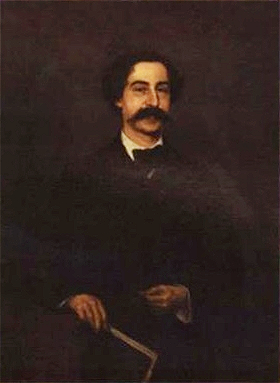
Self-portrait (date unknown)

Jacques François Joseph Carabain, or Jacob Frans Jozef Carabain (23 February 1834, Amsterdam – 2 January 1933, Schaerbeek) was a Dutch-Belgian painter, known primarily for his scenes of cities and buildings in the Romantic-Realist style. He was especially interested in Medieval and Baroque structures, and was often attracted to busy market places.

== Biography ==
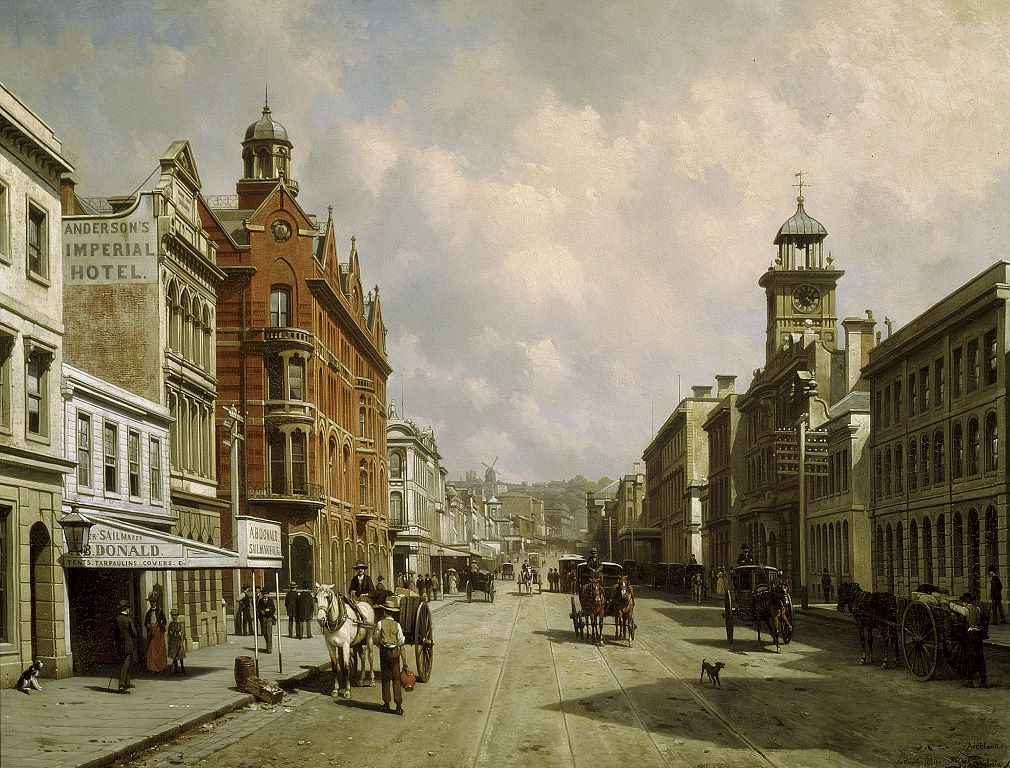
Queen Street, Auckland.

He began his studies at the Amsterdamer Kunstakademie, where he initially painted landscapes and seascapes as well as cityscapes. His teachers there included Jacobus Schoemaker Doyer and Valentijn Bing. His first major showing was at the Exhibition of Living Masters in 1852. He lived in Amsterdam until 1856, when he travelled throughout Europe, then lived in Brussels for a short time before settling in Schaerbeek. It was there he began specializing in cityscapes and was influenced by François-Antoine Bossuet.

Eventually, he painted cities in Italy, Germany, France and Austria as well. He also exhibited at the Third (1873) and Fourth (1874) International Exhibitions in London.

In 1880, he became a Belgian citizen. In 1885, he travelled to New Zealand and Australia, where he exhibited at the Victorian Academy of Arts. After living in Melbourne for a time, he returned home in 1889.

From 1894 to 1897, he painted a series of 59 watercolors depicting the old areas of Brussels. This was the result of a commission from Mayor Charles Buls, who was concerned about the grandiose redevelopment plans being carried out by King Leopold II. In 2011, a major exhibition featuring these works was held at the Museum of the City of Brussels.

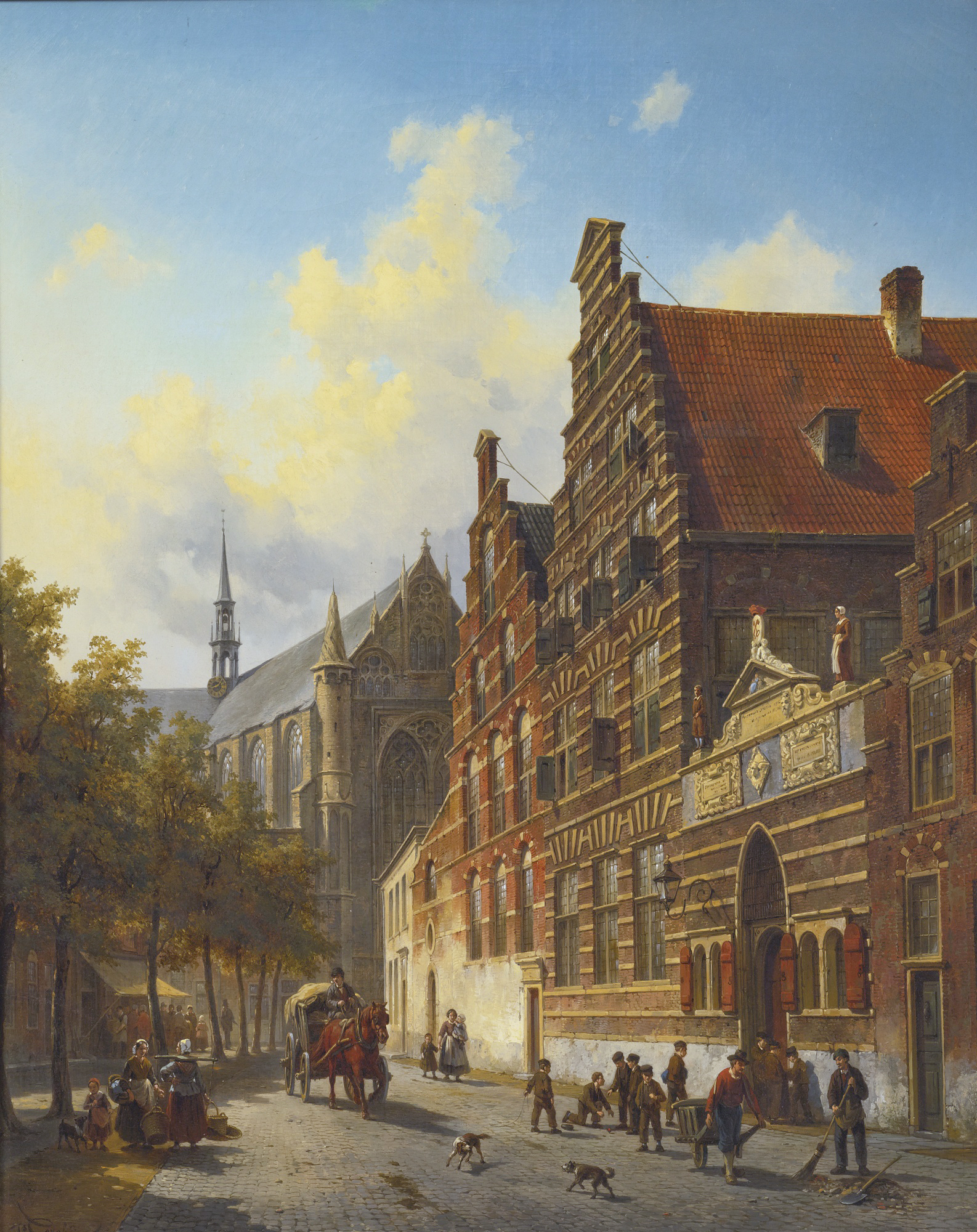
The Holy Spirit Orphanage in Leiden.

He held his last exhibition in 1907 and appears to have stopped painting. A few sources give that as his year of death, although he actually lived for twenty-six more years and died one month short of his 99th birthday.

Two of his children became artists; Victor (1863-1942), who also did cityscapes, and Emile, a still-life painter about whom little is known.
