= J.C.J. van Speijk Lighthouse =

J.C.J. van Speijk Lighthouse Egmond aan Zee
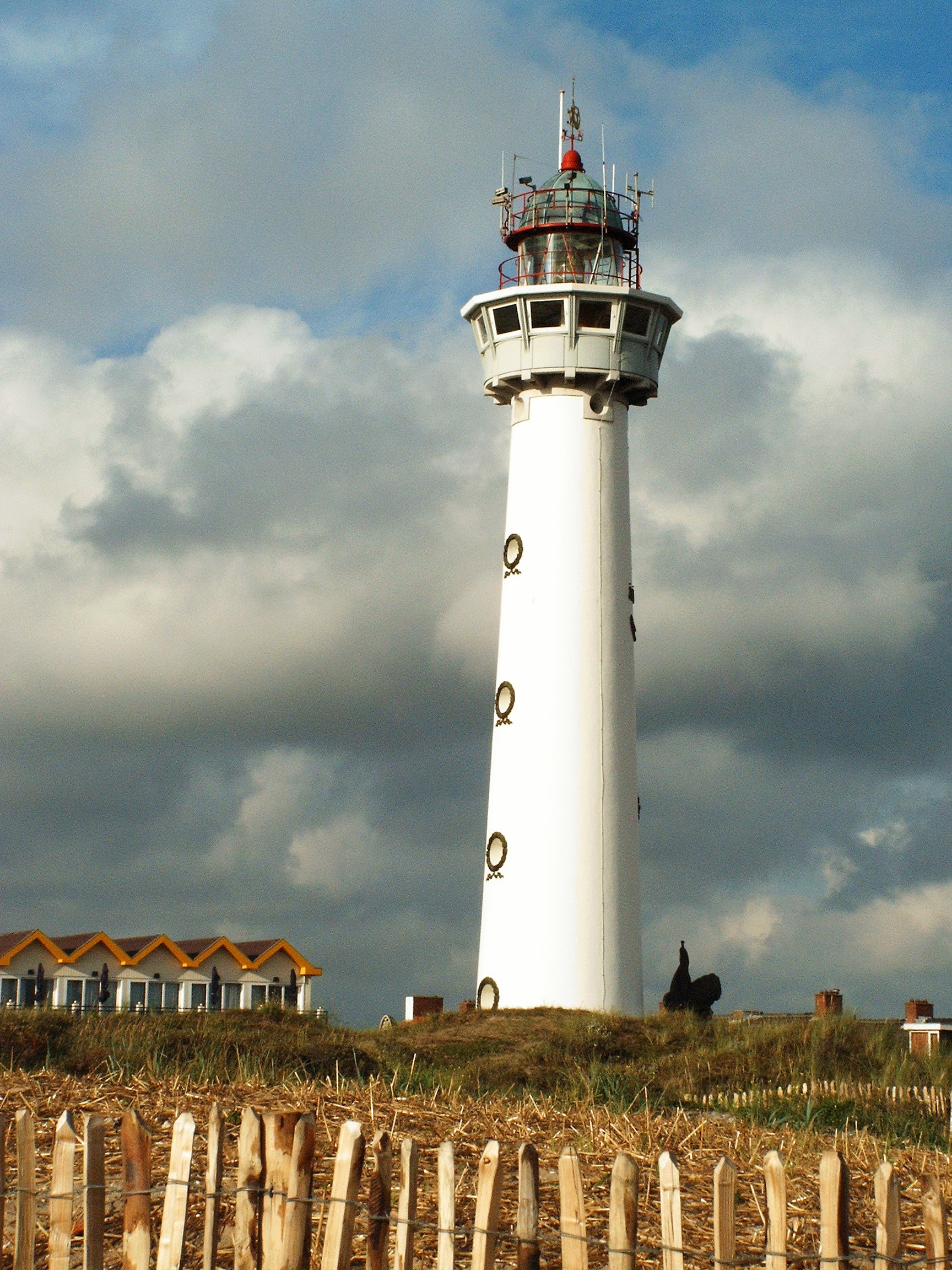
- Vuurtoren J.C.J. van Speijk
- Location: Egmond aan Zee, Netherlands
- Coordinates: 52°37′8.6″N 4°37′18″E

Tower
- Constructed: 1833
- Construction: brick tower
- Automated: 1990
- Height: 28 metres (92 ft)
- Shape: tapered cylindrical tower with balcony and lantern on one-story keeper's house
- Markings: white tower, grey lantern and observation room
- Heritage: Rijksmonument

Light
- First lit: 30 September 1834
- Focal height: 37 metres (121 ft)
- Intensity: white: 45,000 cd red: 41,000 cd
- Range: white: 18 nautical miles (33 km) red: 14 nautical miles (26 km)
- Characteristic: Iso WR 10s.
- Netherlands no.: NL-1476

The J.C.J. van Speijk Lighthouse is a lighthouse on the North Sea coast near Egmond aan Zee, in the municipality of Bergen, North Holland, in the Netherlands. The foundation of the lighthouse, shaped like a tomb, is the official Dutch memorial to Jan van Speyk, a hero to the Dutch people.

The treacherous sea near Egmond necessitated the construction of two lighthouses, which were built in 1833. The northside of the light is red to warn for dangerous shallows near the coast north of Egmond. As soon as a ship leaves the danger zone it sees the white light. The south tower, on the Torensduin, was deactivated in 1891 and demolished in 1915. The north tower is still there, and is declared a Rijksmonument.

== Van Speijkmonument ==
The lighthouse was selected in 1834 as the national J.C.J van Speijkmonument, to honor the memory of the Dutch naval hero. The original idea was to build a new tower as a monument, but there were insufficient funds, so the existing tower was reconstructed. The monument was designed by Jan David Zocher and built by J. Bos from dimension stone.

After the construction of the North Sea Canal and the two lighthouses at its mouth, in IJmuiden, the van Speijk lighthouse was equipped with red windows, to avoid confusion. In 1891 it was equipped with a rotating light; in the same year, the south tower was extinguished.

In 1984, the 150th anniversary of the lighthouse and monument was celebrated; a commemorative booklet was published by the Museum van Egmond.

== Timeline ==
- 1823: Decision to build a lighthouse is made
- 1833: Construction starts
- 1834: Construction finished, lighthouse keepers appointed, fire is lit
- 1838: Royal decree to renovate lighthouse
- 1841: Renovation as monument finished
- 1879: Light extinguished temporarily (15 February to 15 March)
- 1891: Rotating light installed
- 1915: Day screens removed
- 1922: Electric light installed, balcony redone in concrete, lighthouse renewed
- 1936: Characteristic changed to Iso 10s
- 1967: Lighthouse declared Rijksmonument

== Webcams ==
The lighthouse has five webcams to keep an eye on the coast. The webcams can be accessed through visitegmond.nl.

== Gallery ==
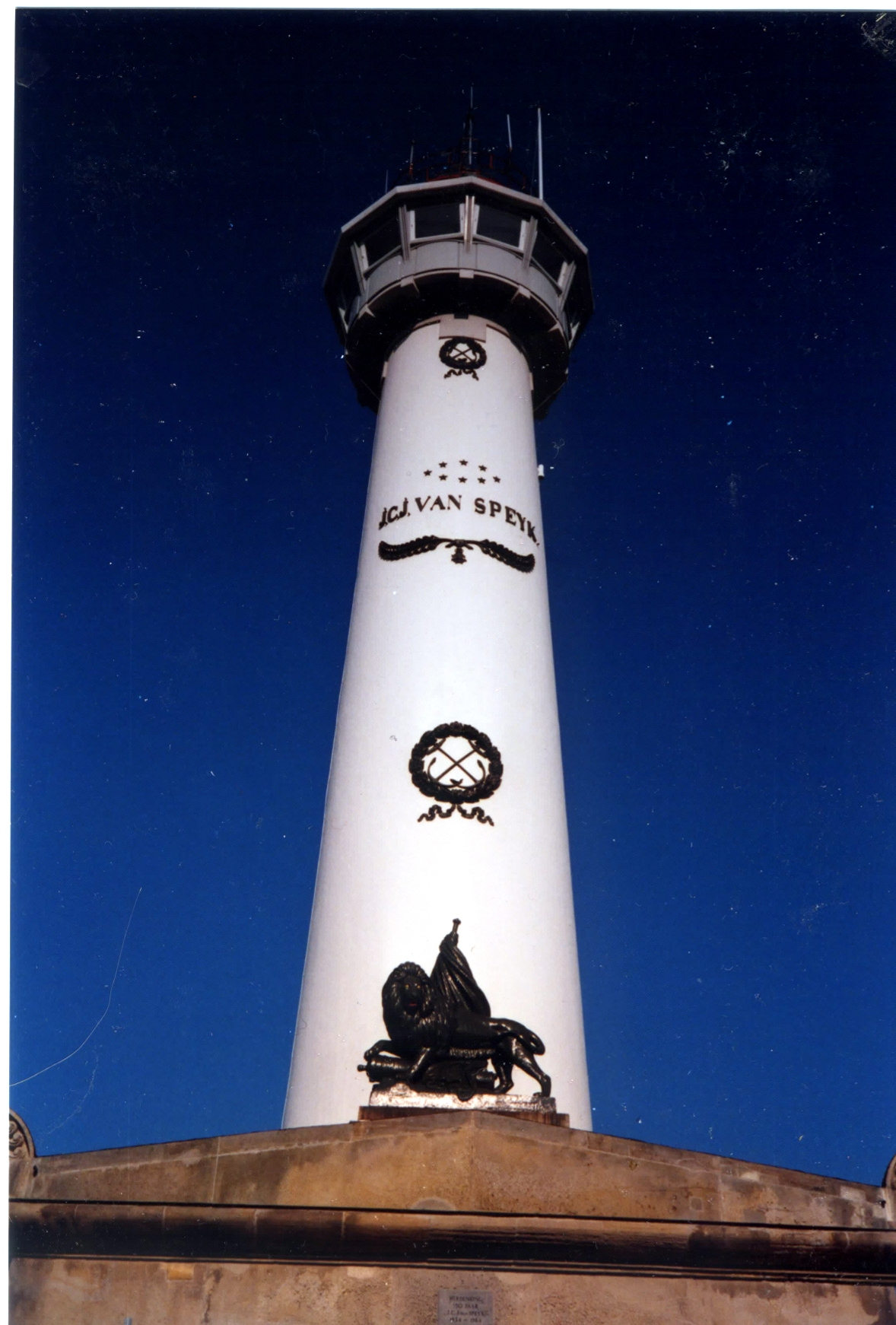

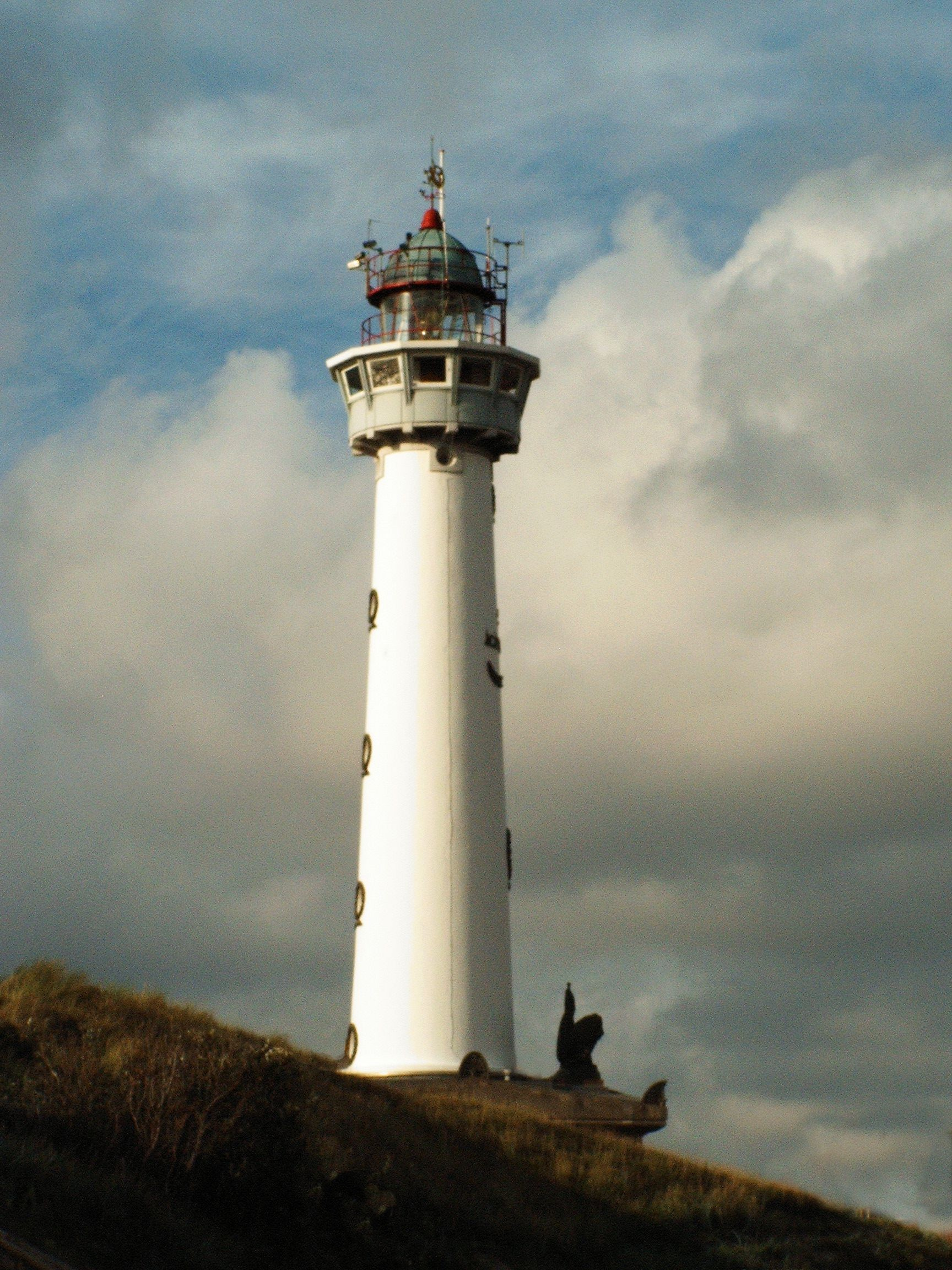

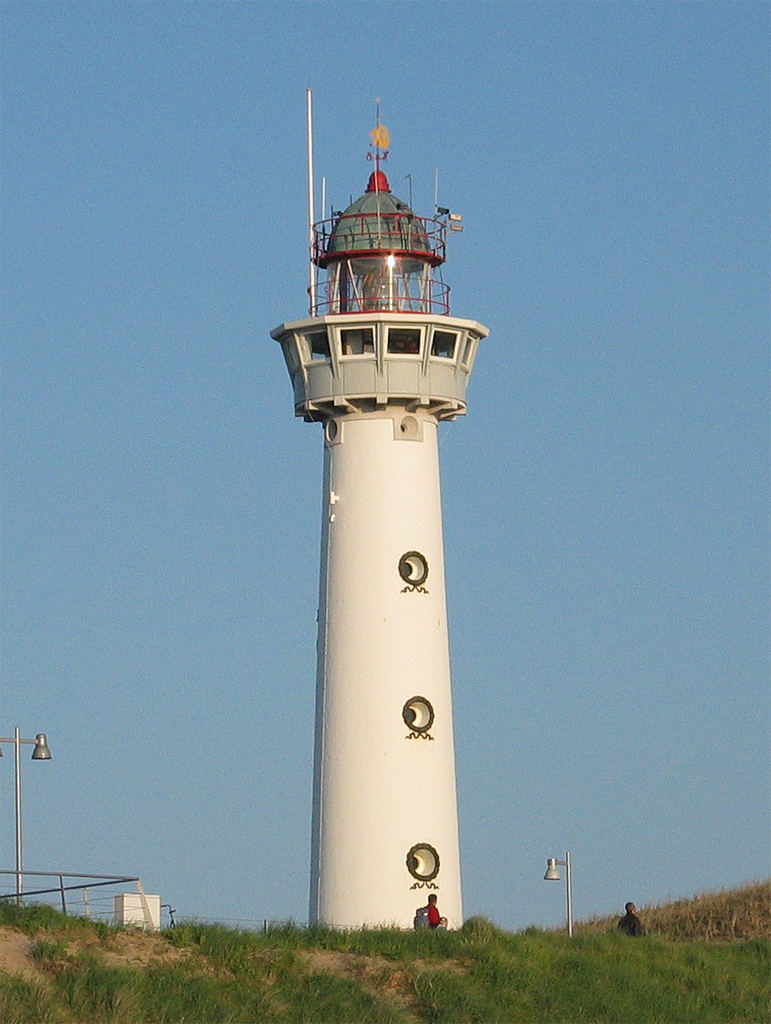

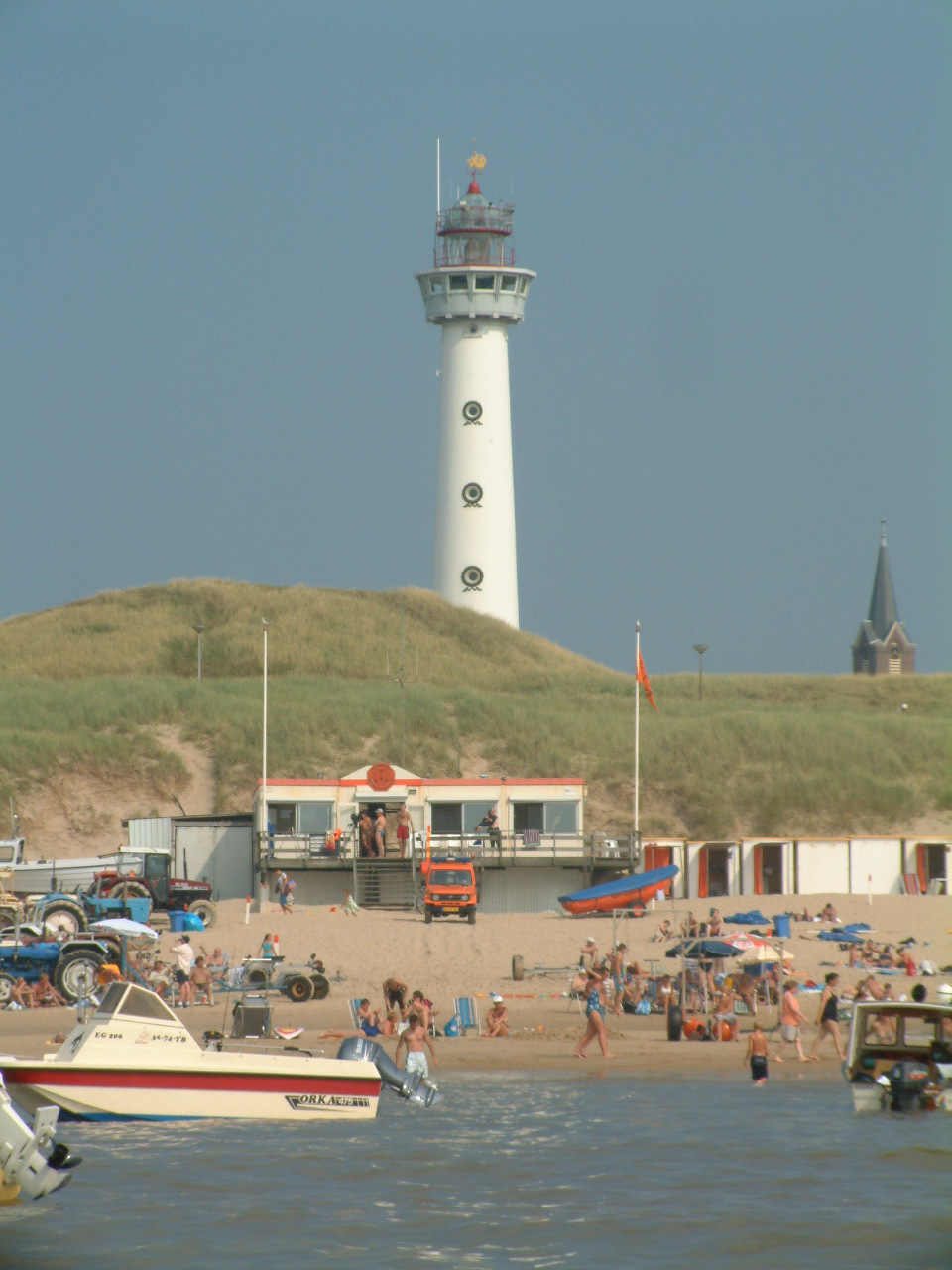

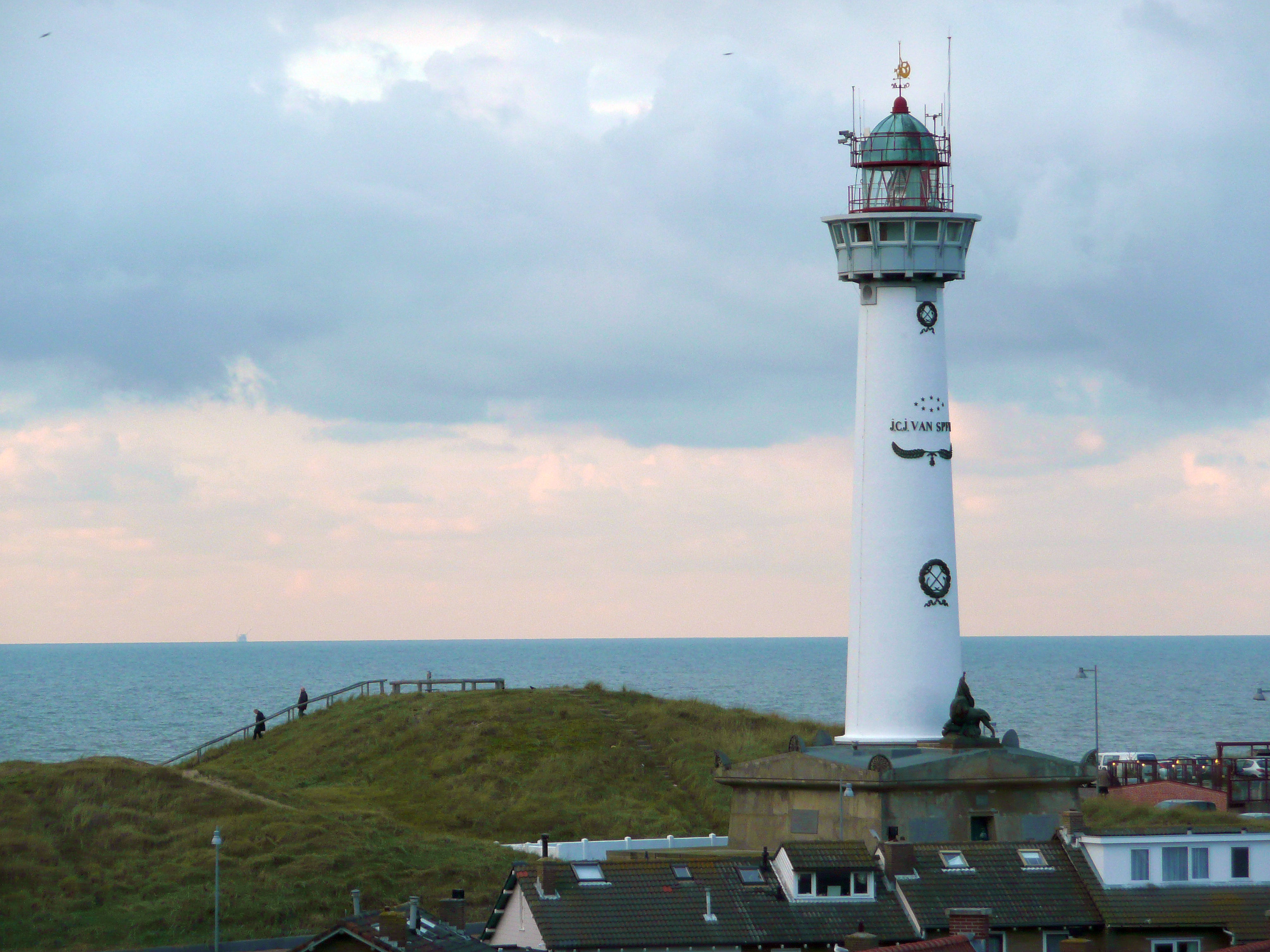

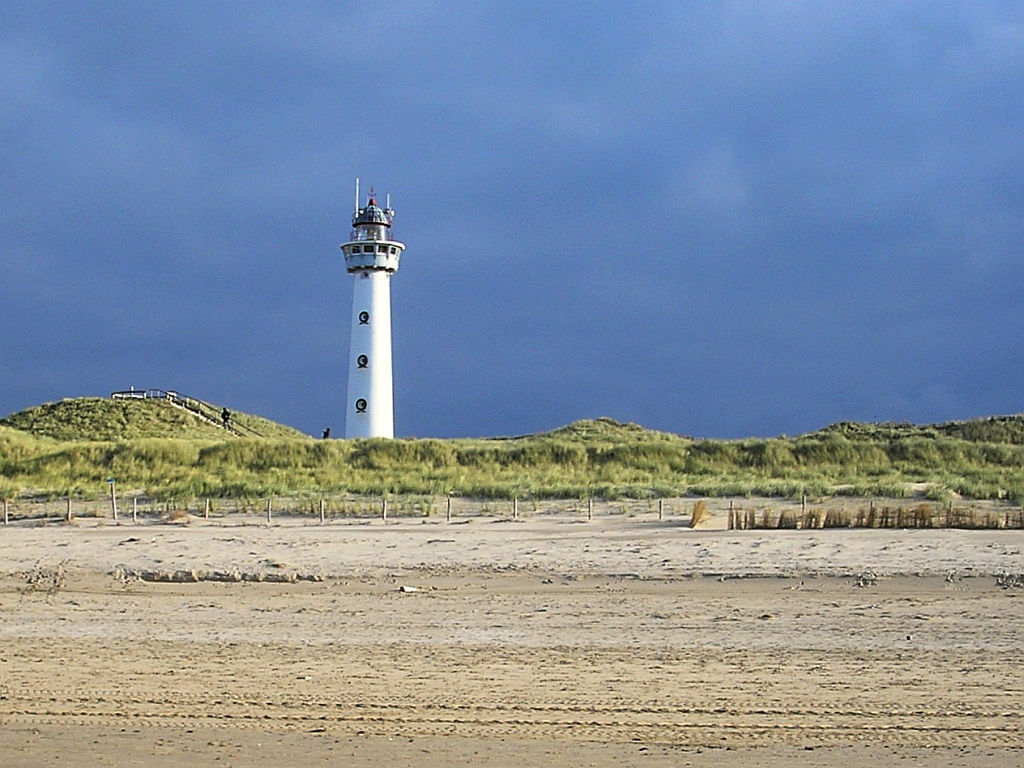

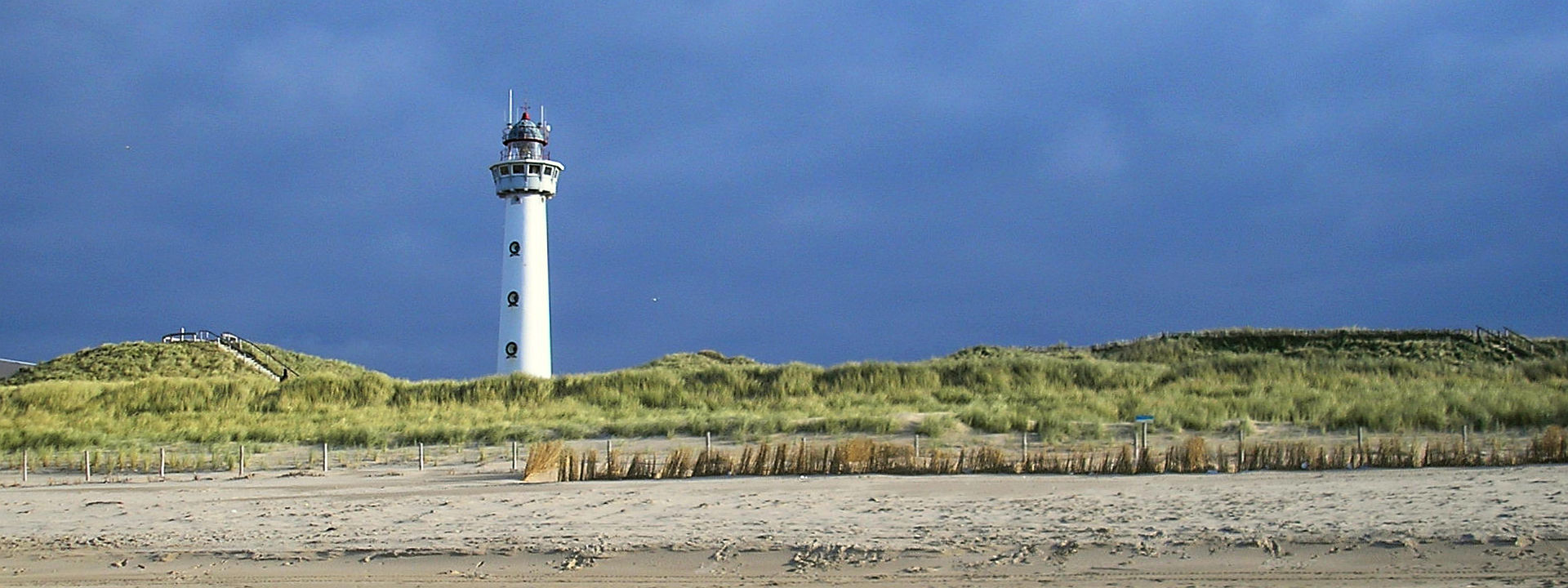

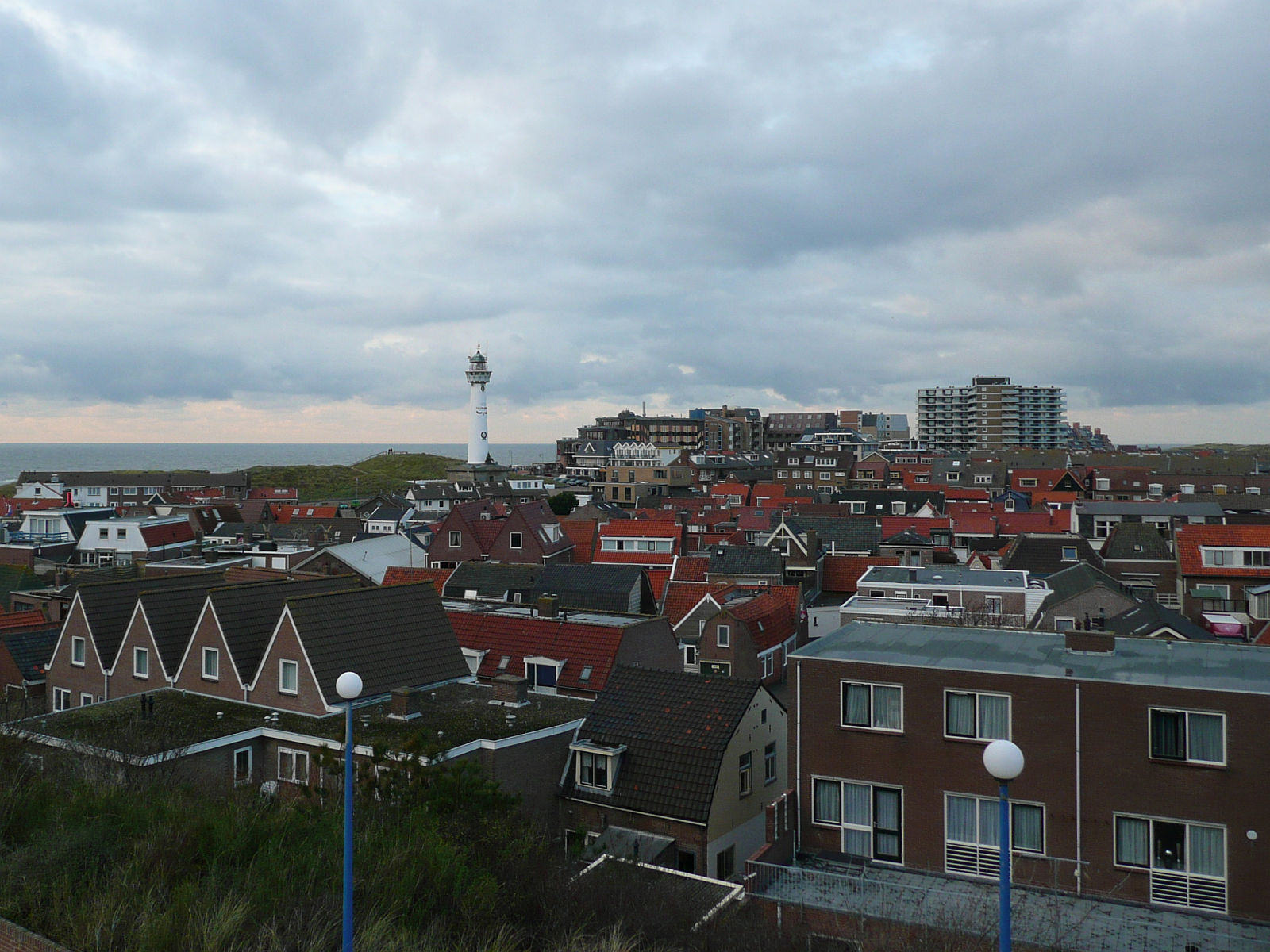

== See also ==
- List of lighthouses in the Netherlands
