= Marie Wandscheer =

Dutch artist (1856–1936)

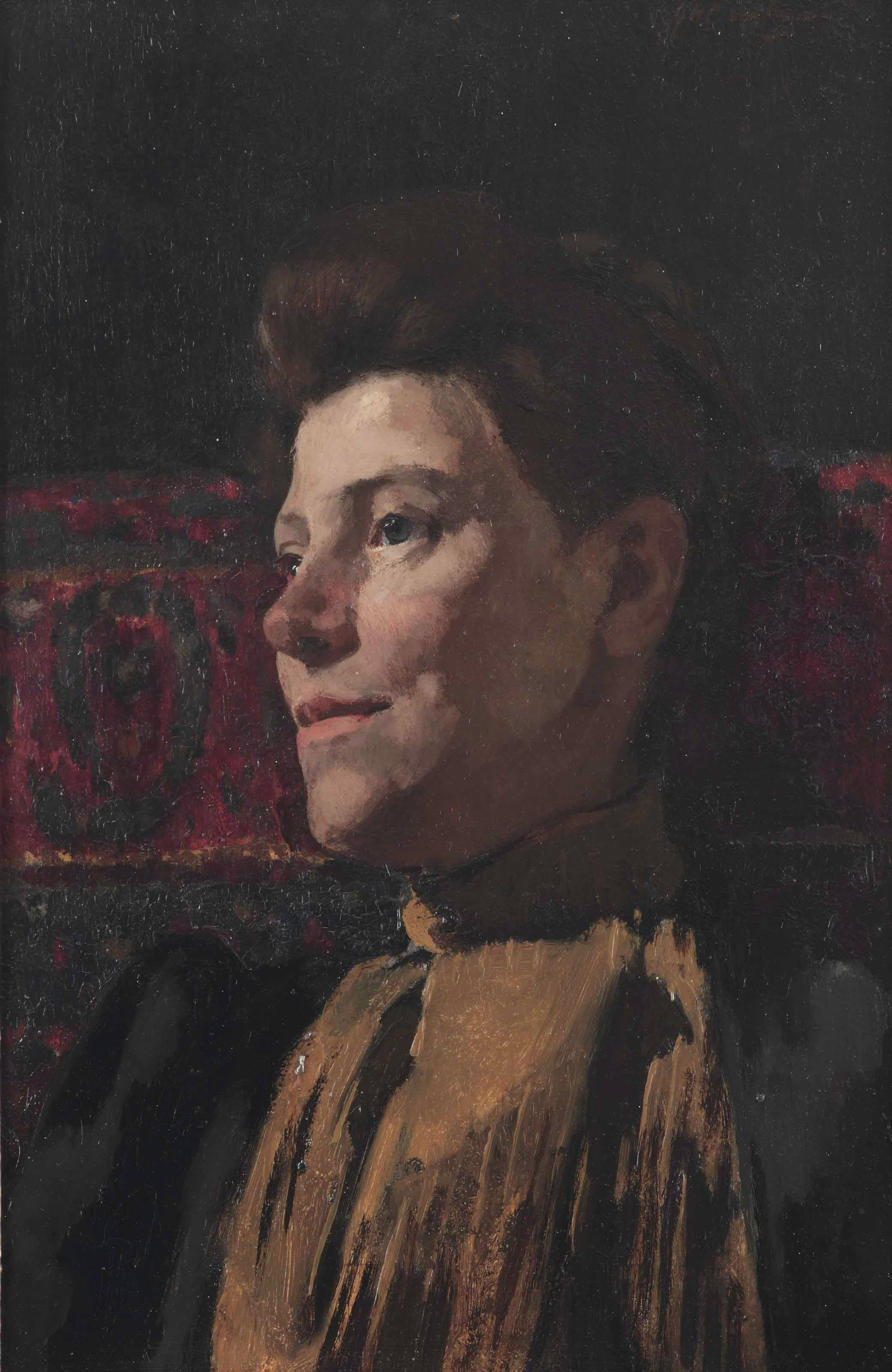
- Marie Wandscheer, by Willem Witsen
- Born: 19 November 1856; Amsterdam, Netherlands
- Died: 18 September 1936 (aged 79); Ede, Netherlands
- Education: Rijksakademie van beeldende kunsten
- Known for: Painting

Maria Wilhelmina Wandscheer, known as Marie (1856 – 1936) was a Dutch painter; primarily of female portraits and flowers.

== Biography ==
She was born to Johan Frederik Christiaan Wandscheer, the Director of a shipping line, and his wife, Anna Christina née Pilger. She never married.

Her first painting lessons were provided by Valentijn Bing, then she studied with August Allebé, for ten years, at the Rijksakademie van beeldende kunsten.

From 1892 to 1895, she lived in Nieuwer-Amstel, then moved to Ede, where she would live for the rest of her life. There, she befriended the painter and etcher, Willem Witsen, who gave her further lessons. She was also a close friend of Lizzy Ansingh, one of the Amsterdamse Joffers, a group with which she became associated. In addition to her oil paintings, she created pastels and etchings.

Her professional memberships included Arti et Amicitiae and the Pulchri Studio. She held several exhibitions, in Amsterdam, The Hague, Rotterdam, and Ede. She also exhibited with the Pictura Veluvensis society in Renkum. Only a few exhibits have been held since her death; most recently at the Historisch Museum Ede in 2006.

== Gallery ==
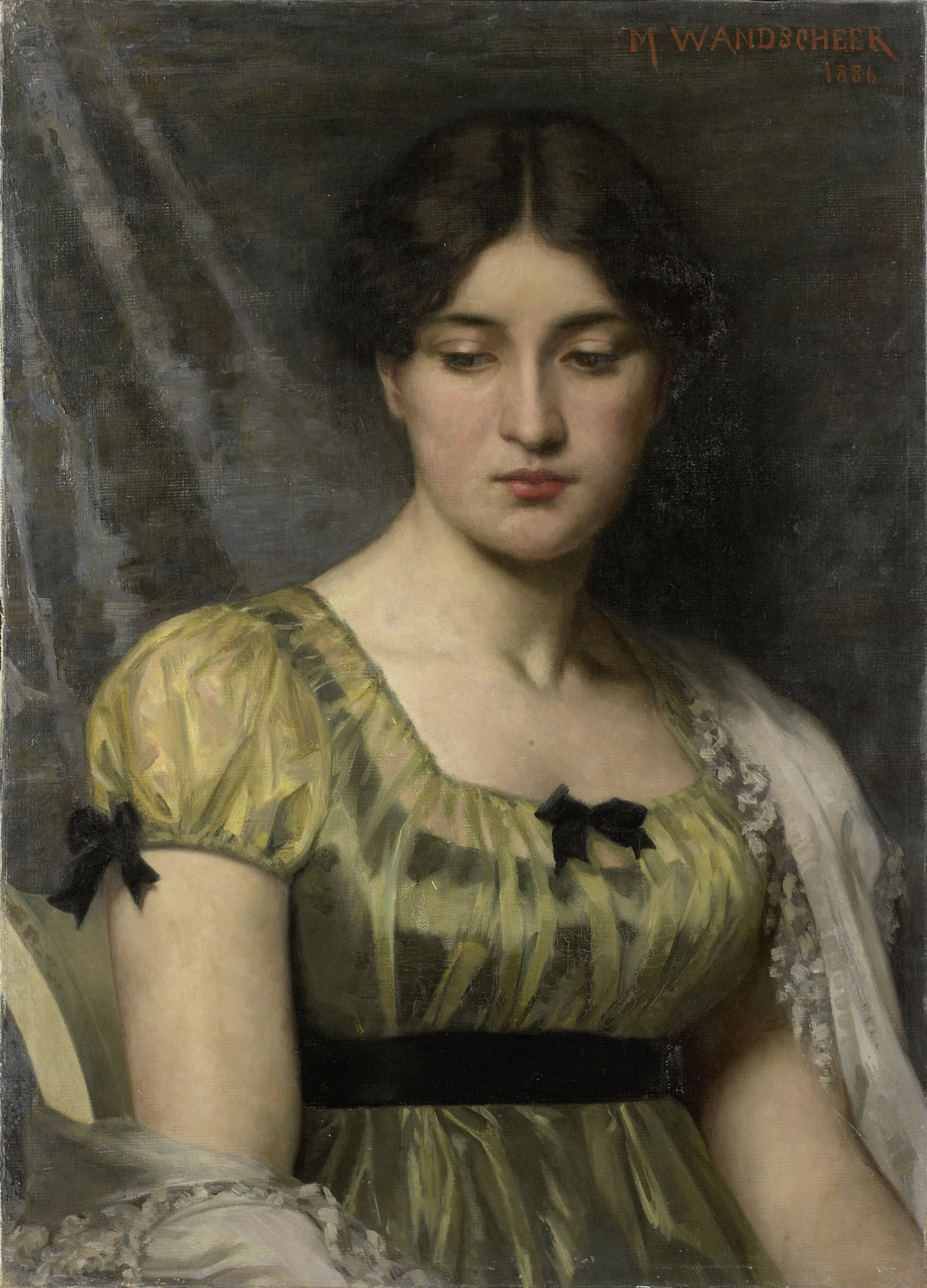
Portrait of a Woman, 1886 in the collection of the Rijksmuseum

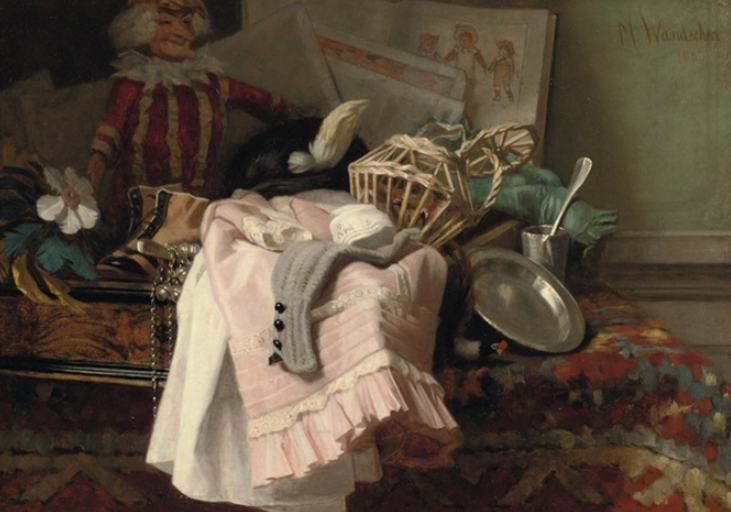
Children's toys, 1883

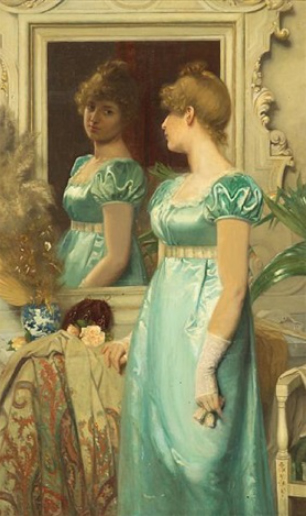
Before the ball, 1886

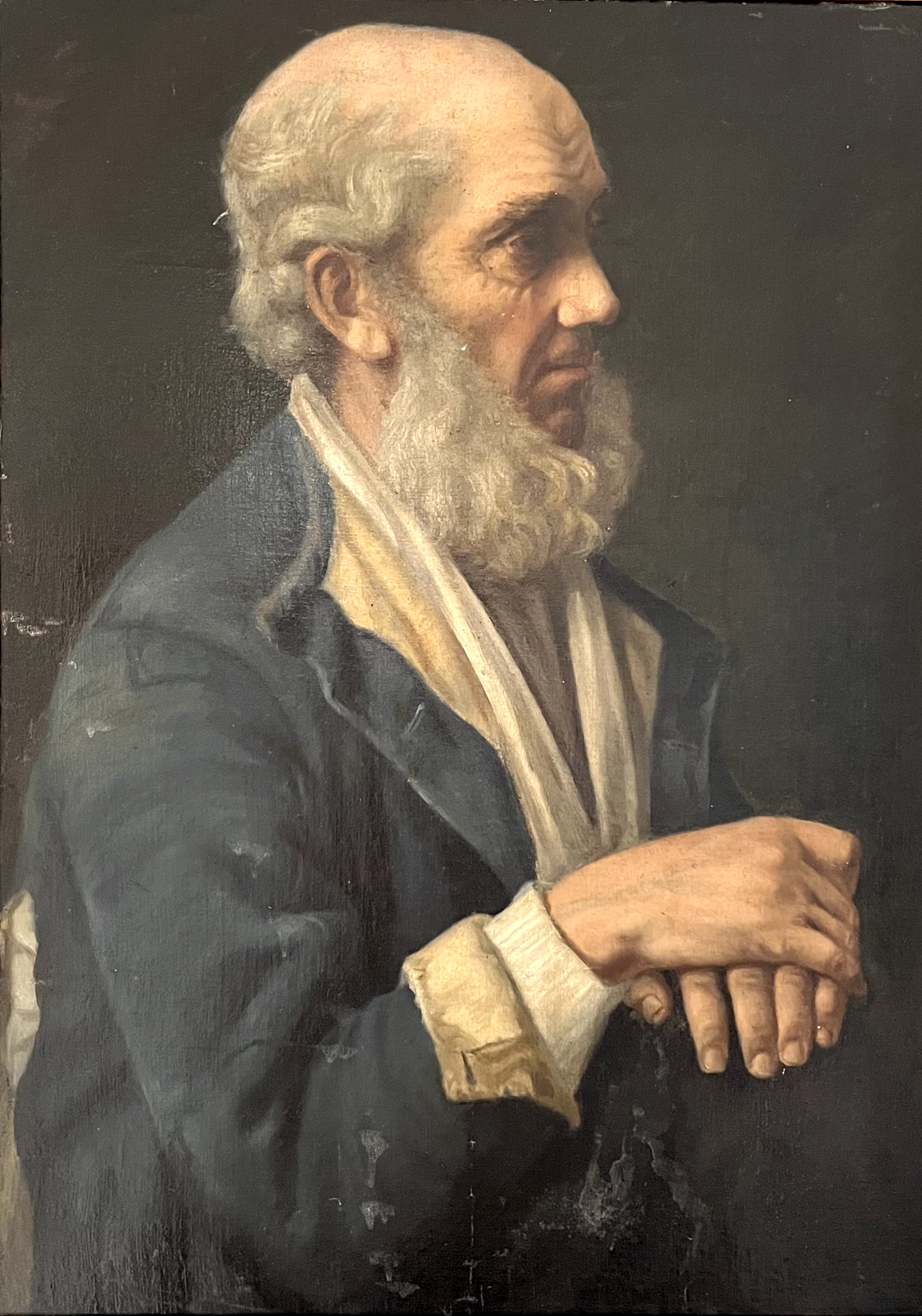
Portrait of an older gentleman (“Portret oudere heer”)
