= Edouard de Jans =

Flemish painter

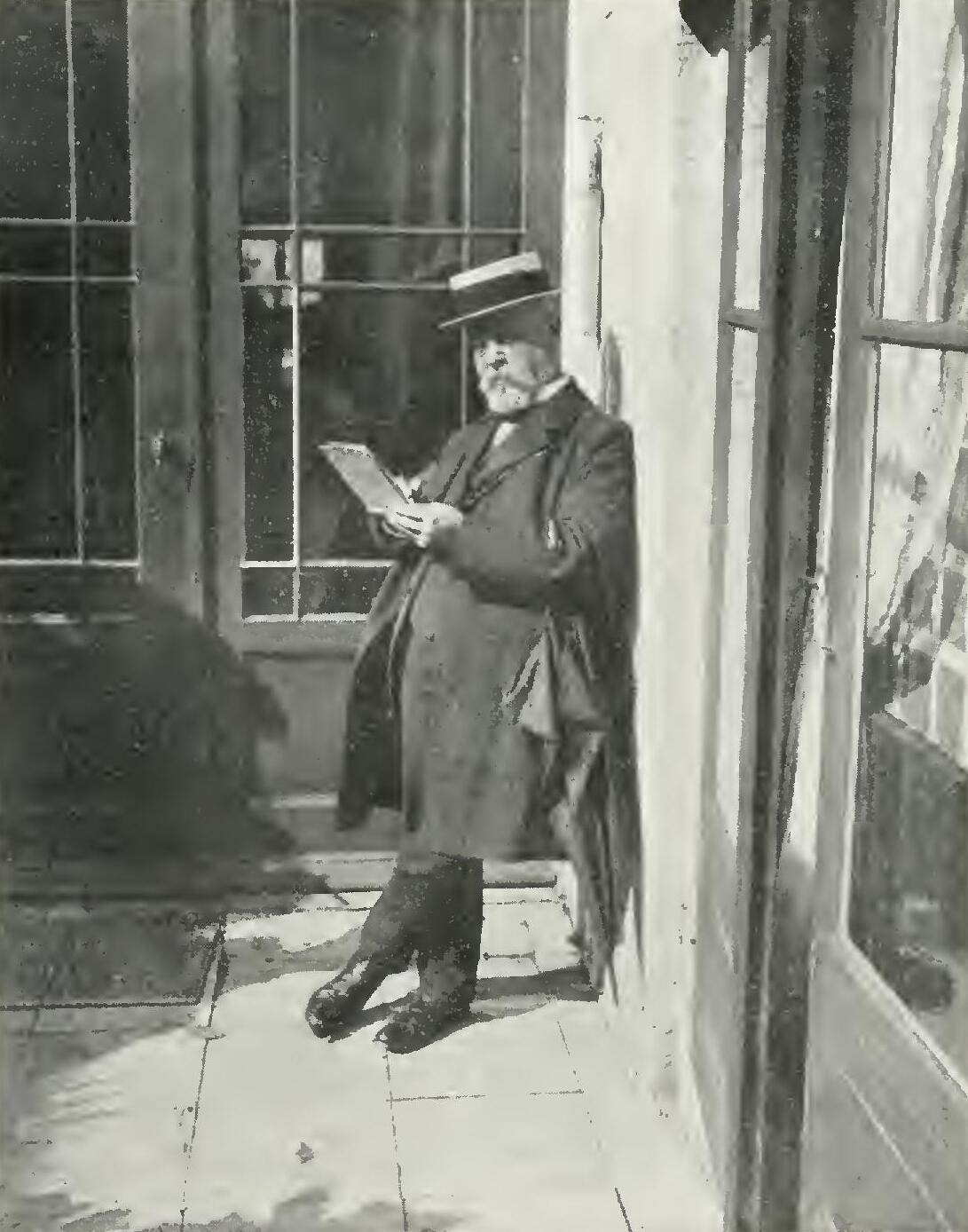
- Born: Edouard de Jans; 16 April 1855; Sint-Andries, Belgium
- Died: 11 July 1919 (aged 64); Antwerp, Belgium
- Education: Bruges Academy of Fine Arts
- Occupation: Painter
- Relatives: Luisa (daughter)

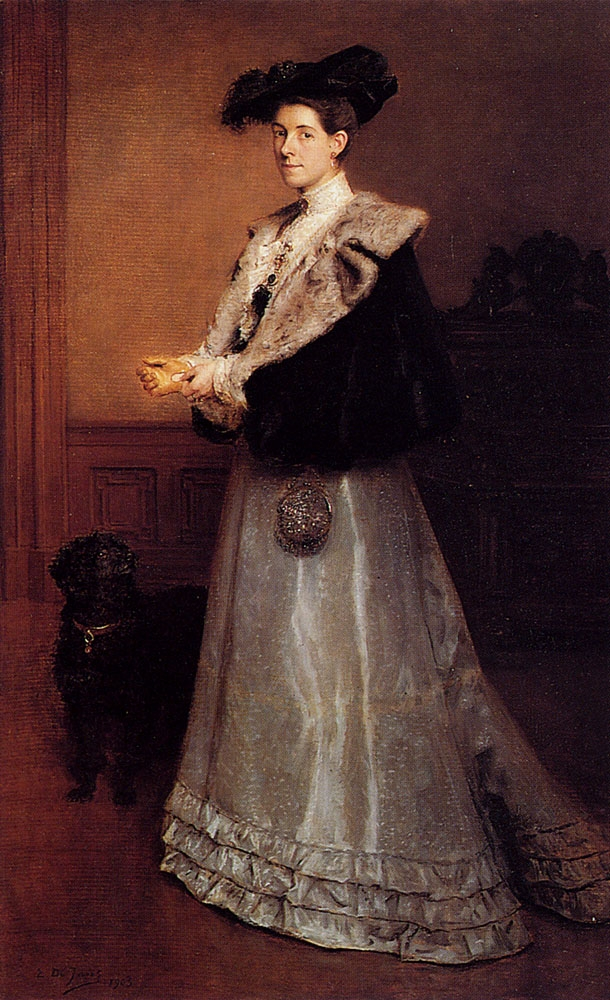
Portrait of a Lady

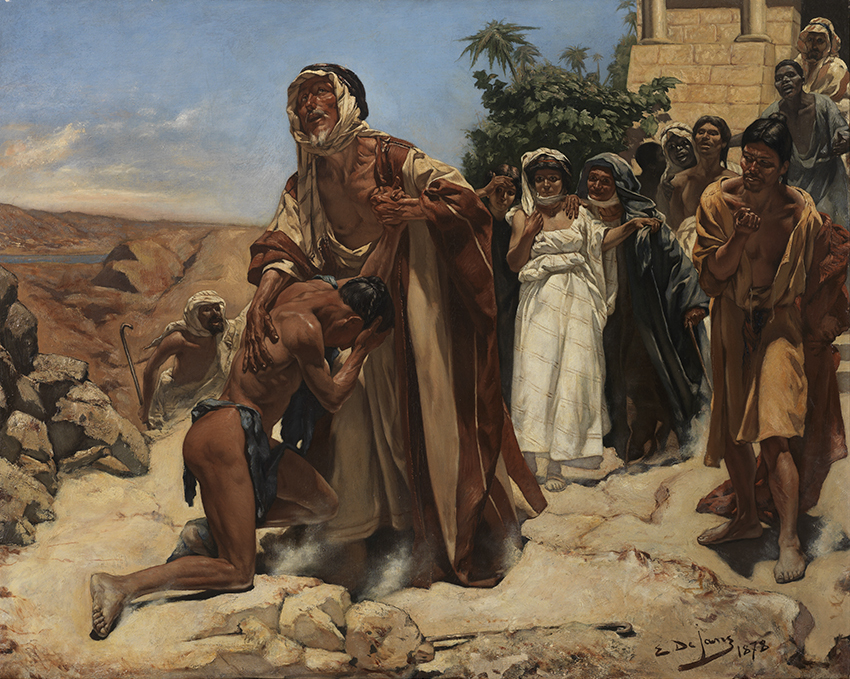
The Return of the Prodigal Son

Edouard de Jans (16 April 1855, in Sint-Andries – 11 July 1919, in Antwerp) was a Flemish portrait and genre painter.

== Biography ==
His father was a farmer and miller. It is said that he first became interested in art when he saw a display in the window of a lithographer's shop. His talent was noticed at school, but came to little until a local aristocrat asked Jans to make drawings of a castle, "Steentien", which he was restoring. He was sufficiently impressed to offer Jans a chance to study at the local art school (the Bogardenschool). In his first year, he received orders for drawings from the Mayor and other notables. This made it possible for him to attend the Bruges Academy of Fine Arts in 1869, studying with the Director, Eduard Wallays. By 1873, he was a teacher at the Bogardenschool.

Two years later, he was accepted at the Royal Academy of Fine Arts (Antwerp) and placed in the Master Class, where his instructor was Nicaise De Keyser. He also studied genre painting with Polydore Beaufaux and Charles Verlat. Although he specialized in portraits, he also did Biblical scenes, history paintings and landscapes.

In 1876, he received a scholarship from the Prix de Rome for his painting "Return of the Prodigal Son", which enabled him to travel throughout Europe, visiting France, Italy, Germany and Austria. When he returned to Antwerp in 1889, he was appointed a Professor at the Academy and held that position until his death.

A street in Bruges is named after him. His daughter Luisa (1884-1968) also became a painter.
