= Polydore Beaufaux =

Belgian painter (1829–1905)

- Born: Polydore Beaufaux; 30 November 1829; Court-Saint-Étienne, Belgium
- Died: 7 May 1905 (aged 84); Wavre, Belgium
- Education: Royal Academy of Fine Arts (Antwerp)
- Occupation: Painter

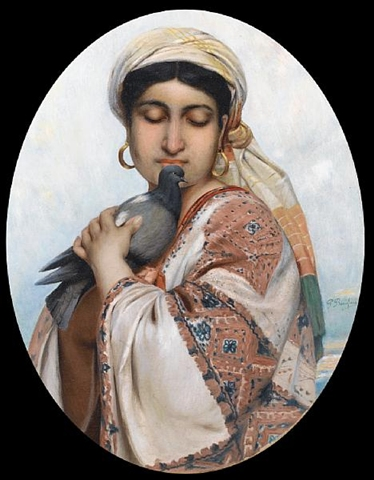
Oriental Girl with a Dove (date unknown)

Polydore Beaufaux (30 November 1829 – 7 May 1905) was a Belgian painter. He favored Biblical scenes, portraits and genre pieces.

== Life ==
From 1844 to 1850, he studied at the Royal Academy of Fine Arts (Antwerp). In 1857, he won the Prix de Rome (Belgium) for painting. He used his prize money to make a study trip from 1859 to 1863, visiting France and Italy, where he did a portrait of Pope Pius IX.

The following year, he became a Professor at the Academy, where he taught a course entitled "Painting from Life". Léon Abry, Gerard Portielje and Edouard de Jans are among his best-known students. He exhibited regularly at the Paris Salon.

In 1889, he made a trip to England, then left Antwerp to settle in Wavre. A year later, he became paralyzed in his hands and could no longer paint.

== Sources and further reading ==
- Allgemeines Künstlerlexikon, Vol. 8, München-Leipzig (K.G. Saur Verlag), 1994.
- Léon Maret. Le peintre Polydore Beaufaux 1829—1905 Prix de Rome. — S.l., 1967. — 45 pp.
