= Léon Abry =

Belgian painter

Léon-Eugène-Auguste Abry
- Born: 6 March 1857; Antwerp
- Died: 6 November 1905 (aged 48); Antwerp
- Occupation: Painter
- Known for: Military scenes

Léon-Eugène-Auguste Abry (1857–1905) was a Belgian painter who specialized in military scenes

== Life and work ==
He was the son of a General in the Belgian Army. The family moved frequently, from post to post. His father died when he was fourteen, and he had some difficulty adjusting from military life to ordinary bourgeois society.

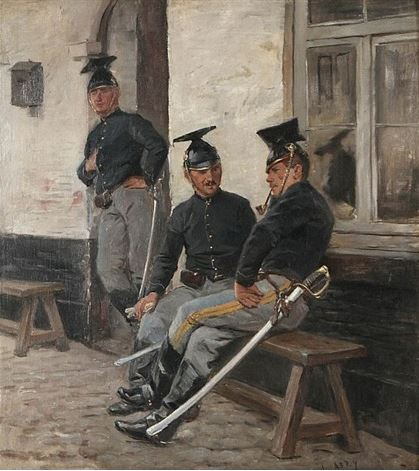
On Guard (date unknown)

He began preparing for a military career, but showed little enthusiasm, being attracted to drawing instead. From 1875 to 1878 he attended the Royal Academy of Fine Arts (Antwerp), where he studied with Nicaise De Keyser and Polydore Beaufaux. He began by painting historical and genre scenes, but soon turned to humorous depictions of military life, taken from his own experiences.

In 1881, he attempted to produce more serious works, but received a very negative response when he exhibited at the Brussels Salon in 1884. As a result, he decided to stay with military themes; slowly introducing non-humorous subjects. To achieve authenticity, he followed troops on their maneuvers and visited the barracks to make sketches. He also painted several canvases showing the Belgian royal family as they observed military exercises.

He was a co-founder of "De XIII", a secession group in Antwerp that included Emile Claus, Henry Luyten, Edgard Farasyn, Evert Larock and Frans Hens. They held their first exhibition in 1891 and planned to continue indefinitely, but succeeded in having only three altogether.
