= Patrice Abry =

French engineer

Patrice Abry is a French engineer affiliated with the French National Centre for Scientific Research (CNRS) and the École normale supérieure de Lyon in Lyon, France.

In 2012, Abry was named a Fellow of the Institute of Electrical and Electronics Engineers (IEEE) for their "contributions to the theory and applications of fractal analysis and multifractal analysis in signal and image processing".
