= Boomer (disambiguation) =

A boomer, or baby boomer, is a person born between 1946 and 1964.

Boomer may refer to:

== People ==
- Boomers (Oklahoma settlers), two groups of settlers
- Boomer (surname)
- Boomer (nickname)

== Places ==
- Boomer Township, Pottawattamie County, Iowa
- Boomer Township, Wilkes County, North Carolina
- Boomer, Missouri
- Boomer, West Virginia, a census-designated place
- Boomer Lake, an artificial reservoir in Stillwater, Oklahoma
- Boomer Island (Tasmania), Australia

== Animals ==
- An adult male kangaroo, nicknamed "boomer" in Australia
- An alternate name for the mountain beaver
- A colloquial name for the American red squirrel
- The greater prairie chicken, a type of grouse native to North America
- Marc Maron's cat

== Characters ==
=== Comics ===
- Owen Mercer, the current Captain Boomerang in the DC Comics universe, nicknamed "Boomer"
- Rotor Walrus, a character from Sonic the Hedgehog, nicknamed "Boomer" in early issues
- Tabitha Smith, a Marvel Comics comic book superhero, formerly called Boomer
- Boomer, a canine character, Poncho's best friend, in Pooch Café

=== Video games ===
- Boomers, a faction of xenophobic people in Fallout: New Vegas
- The Boomer, a recurring Special Infected in the Left 4 Dead series
- Boomers, heavily armored soldiers of the locust horde in the Gears of War series
- Boomer, a main protagonist American and Japanese mascot character in the Boomer's Adventure in ASMIK World video game.
- Boomer, a character in the Skylanders video game, known for wielding explosives enthusiastically
- Boomer, a playable clown character in the Ballz fighting game
- Boomer, a character that appeared in Super Mario RPG
- Boomer, a pixl in the game Super Paper Mario
- Boomer, a canine side-kick in Far Cry 5
- Boomer, a Bot in Rocket League

=== Television ===
- Lieutenant Boomer, a character in the 1978 television series Battlestar Galactica
- Sharon Valerii, a character in the 2004 television series Battlestar Galactica, call-sign "Boomer"
- Dr. Jack "Boomer" Morrison, a character on the U.S. television show St. Elsewhere
- Boomer, an anthropomorphic tug boat from the 1989 TV series, Tugs
- Boomer (Bubblegum Crisis), a fictional synthetic life form in the anime series Bubblegum Crisis
- Boomer, the blond member of the Rowdyruff Boys, a trio of villains in the animated series The Powerpuff Girls
- Boomer, Junior Floogal, from Floogals
- Boomer, Lily's younger brother and one of the main characters from Kate & Mim-Mim
- Boomer Bledsoe, a member of Roger Klotz' gang in the animated series Doug
- Boomer, the title character, a dog, in the 1980 TV series Here's Boomer
- Boomer Parker, one of the twin protagonists of the American sitcom Pair of Kings
- Boomer, one of the main protagonists in the TV series Redakai: Conquer the Kairu
- Sue "Boomer" Jenkins, a character in the Australian drama series Wentworth
- Boomers (TV series), a 2014 BBC One television comedy series

=== Others ===
- Boomer, a woodpecker in the 1981 animated Disney film The Fox and the Hound
- Captain Boomer, a British whaling ship captain who appears briefly in Herman Melville's Moby-Dick
- Boomer, the redhead tomboy in Burger King Kids Club advertising
- Boomer, a monument statue by western artist Harold T. Holden, located in Enid, Oklahoma, dedicated in 1987
- Boomers, a tentative title for the role-playing game Rifts
- Coach Boomer, aka Sonic Boom; the coach in the 2005 film Sky High
- Boomer Badger, character from the National Wildlife Federation's Ranger Rick magazine
- A main character from Wonder Park

== Sports ==
=== Teams ===
- Australia men's national basketball team, officially nicknamed "Australian Boomers"
- Bulleen Boomers, a basketball club based in Bulleen, a north-eastern suburb of Melbourne, Victoria, Australia
- Calgary Boomers, a former professional soccer team in Canada
- Melbourne Boomers, an Australian women's basketball club
- Schaumburg Boomers, a Frontier League baseball team based in Schaumburg, Illinois

=== Mascots ===
- Boomer (mascot), the mascot of the NBA's Indiana Pacers
- Boomer, mascot of the Missouri State University Bears
- Boomer, mascot of the Port Vale F.C., an association football (soccer) club
- Boomer Baller, mascot of the Kannapolis Cannon Ballers minor league baseball team
- Boomer the Bear, mascot of the Western Hockey League's Spokane Chiefs
- Boomer the Bulldog, mascot for Dean College's sports teams
- Boomer and Sooner, mascots for the University of Oklahoma's sports teams
- Buzz and Boomer, mascots of the Canadian Football League's Winnipeg Blue Bombers

== In the military ==
- A ballistic missile submarine in American naval slang
- VT-27, a US Navy training squadron nicknamed the "Boomers"

== Other uses ==
- The Boomers (band), a Canadian rock band from Ontario
- Boomers! Parks, a theme park / family entertainment center chain
- Boomer, a freeware pharmacokinetic modeling software

== See also ==
- Boom (disambiguation)
- Boom Boom (disambiguation)
