= Boom =

Boom may refer to:

== Objects ==
- Boom (containment), a temporary floating barrier used to contain an oil spill
- Boom (navigational barrier), an obstacle used to control or block marine navigation
- Boom (sailing), a sailboat part
- Boom (windsurfing), a piece of windsurfing equipment
- Boom (ship), a type of Arab sailing vessel
- Log boom, a barrier placed in a river
- Boom, the lifting part of a crane
- Boom microphone
- Boom, the rear fuselage of an aircraft, as in twin boom
- Boom, short for boomerang
- Boom barrier, used to block vehicular or pedestrian access

== Arts and entertainment ==
=== Music ===
==== Performers ====
- Boom! (group), a pop band founded by Hear'Say member Johnny Shentall
- The Boom, a Japanese rock band
- Boom Gaspar (born 1953), piano/keyboard/organ player for the band Pearl Jam
- Boom, a member of the animated girl group VBirds

==== Albums ====
- Boom (The Sonics album), 1966
- Boom (Mario Pavone album), 2004
- Boom (Garmonbozia album)
- Boom, 2006, by The Fuzztones

==== Songs ====
- "Boom" (Anastacia song), the official song for the 2002 FIFA World Cup
- "Boom" (Mario song), a 2005 R&B single featuring Juvenile
- "Boom" (P.O.D. song), 2002
- "Boom" (Royce da 5'9" song)
- "Boom" (Snoop Dogg song), 2011
- "Boom" (T-Pain song), 2008, with Filip Filippi, better known as Sin Sizzerb
- "Boom" (X Ambassadors song), 2019
- "Boom!" (System of a Down song), 2003
- "Boom", by Anjulie, 2008
- "Boom", by the Bloodhound Gang from One Fierce Beer Coaster (1996)
- "Boom", by Flight of the Conchords from the 2007 episode "Bret Gives Up the Dream"
- "Boom!", by Lil Yachty featuring Ugly God from the 2018 album Lil Boat 2
- "Boom", 2008, by gospel R&B duo Mary Mary from The Sound
- "Boom", by Soulfly on Primitive
- "Boom!", by Simple Plan from their 2016 album Taking One for the Team
- "Boom", by YoungBoy Never Broke Again from his 2020 album Top
- "BOOM", a 2024 single by Evil Neuro

==== Festivals ====
- Boom Festival, an electronic music festival in Portugal
- BOOM Festival, a former Yugoslav music festival

=== Films ===
- Boom! (1968 film), a 1968 British drama starring Elizabeth Taylor, Richard Burton and Noël Coward
- Boom (2003 film), a 2003 Bollywood comedy
- Il Boom, 1963, by Italian director Vittorio de Sica

=== Television ===
- Boom! (TV series), a 2005 American reality series
- Boom! (Israeli game show), 2014
  - Boom! (American game show), 2015 American adaptation
  - ¡Boom!, Spanish adaptation (2014–2024)
- Boom, the original title of the U.S. TV series Blood & Oil
- "Boom" (CSI), an episode of the TV series C.S.I.: Crime Scene Investigation
- "Boom!" (Castle), a television episode
- "BOOM" (Agents of S.H.I.E.L.D.), a television episode
- Boom (Power Rangers), a character from the American TV series Power Rangers: S.P.D.
- "Boom" (Doctor Who), an episode of the fourteenth series of Doctor Who

=== Other uses in arts and entertainment ===
- Boom! Studios, an American comics publisher
- Boom! (novel), a 2009 children's science fiction novel by Mark Haddon
- Boom (play), by Peter Sinn Nachtreib
- Boom (source port), a source port of the computer game Doom

== Places ==
- Boom, Belgium, a municipality
- Boom Mountain, on the border between Alberta and British Columbia, Canada
- Boom Gorge, on the Chu River in Kyrgyzstan
- Boom, Tennessee, a community in the US
- Boom, Texas, former name of Summerfield, Texas

== Media ==
- BOOM (website), Indian fact-checking website
- BOOMTV, a proposed Canadian premium TV service
- Boom TV (Romania), a satellite TV company
- Boom TV (Macedonia), a digital TV provider
- Boom TV (Cape Verde), a defunct Cape Verdan television channel
- Boom! Studios, an American comic book and graphic novel publisher
- Boom FM, a classic hits radio station brand in Canada
- Boom Radio, a UK radio station
- KROI, a radio station serving the Greater Houston area, branded as "Boom 92"
- XERP-AM, a Mexican radio station serving the Tampico, Tamaulipas area, branded as "boom 104.7"
- WPHI-FM, a radio station serving the Philadelphia area, branded as "Boom 107.9"

== People ==
- Boom (surname)
- Boom (nickname)
- Boom (entertainer) (born 1982), South Korean rapper, singer and actor
- Boudewijn Karel Boom, Dutch botanist for whose name it is the standard abbreviation

== Other uses ==
- Sonic boom, the sound created by an object traveling through the air faster than the speed of sound
- Economic boom, a time of rapid growth in wealth, as in a boom town
- Baby boom, a period marked by a greatly increased birth rate
- Boom Technology, a startup aircraft company

== See also ==
- Latin American Boom, a 1960s literary movement
- Bang (disambiguation)
- Boom Boom (disambiguation)
- Boomer (disambiguation)
- Boum (disambiguation)
- Kaboom (disambiguation), including Ka-Boom
- Blam (disambiguation)
- Boon (disambiguation)
- BOM (disambiguation)
