= Kaboom =

Kaboom is an onomatopoeic term representing the sound of a loud explosion.

Kaboom may also refer to:

== Arts, entertainment, media ==
=== Literature ===
- Kaboom (book), a 2010 Iraq War memoir by Matt Gallagher
- Ka-Boom!, the student newspaper at Thornlea Secondary School, Markham, Ontario, Canada

=== Film, television, stage ===
- Kaboom (film), a 2010 film directed by Gregg Araki
- Ka-Boom, Italian TV children's programming block and TV network
- Ka-Boom! (off-Broadway musical), a 1980 off-Broadway musical

==== TV episodes ====
- "Kaboom" (Parks and Recreation), an episode of Parks and Recreation
- "Kabooms" (Teen Titans Go!), 2015 season 5 episode of Teen Titans Go!; see List of Teen Titans Go! episodes
- "Ka-Boom!" (Cybill), 1998 season 4 episode of Cybill; see List of Cybill episodes
- "Ka-Boom" (Maggie), 1998 episode of Maggie (1998 TV series)
- "Ka-Boom" (Grace Under Fire), 1994 episode of Grace Under Fire; see List of Grace Under Fire episodes

=== Music ===
- Kaboom! (album), a 2011 album by I Fight Dragons
- KFOG KaBoom, a yearly concert in San Francisco sponsored by KFOG

==== Songs ====
- "KABOOM!", a 2011 song by I Fight Dragons, the title track off the eponymous album Kaboom! (album)
- "Kaboom", an unreleased 2008 duet with Lady Gaga and Kalenna Harper
- "Ka-Boom!", a 2004 song by Dark Lotus off the album Black Rain (Dark Lotus album)

=== Video games ===
- Kaboom! (video game), an Atari 2600 video game
- Kaboom: The Suicide Bombing Game (also known as Kaboom!), a flash game

== Groups, organisations ==
- KaBOOM! (non-profit organization), a U.S. non-profit organization that helps communities build local play-spaces for children
- KaBOOM! (publisher), a U.S. comics publisher
- Kaboom! Entertainment, a Canadian production company
- Kaboom Studios, UK videogame company
- ¡Ka-Boom! Estudio, a Mexican comics studio; see Comics in Mexico
- KaBOOM (Ka-Band Objects Observation and Monitoring System), NASA system for detecting and tracking near-Earth objects

== Characters ==
- Kaboom, the mascot of the Bradley University Braves
- Colonel Ka-Boom, a fictional character from Creepy Crawlers (TV series)
- Katie Ka-Boom, a fictional character from Animaniacs
- Louie Kaboom, a fictional character from Power Rangers Zeo
- Mouse Ka-Boom, a fictional character from Happy Tree Friends; see List of fictional rodents in animation

== Other uses ==
- Kaboom (breakfast cereal), produced by General Mills
- KaBoom (candy), the original name of the candy Wonka Xploder
- Kaboom, a bathroom tile cleaner manufactured by Church and Dwight

== See also ==
- "Ka-Boom Ka-Boom" (song), 2003 Marilyn Manson song off the album The Golden Age of Grotesque
- "Ka-Blam" (Harper's Island episode), 2009 episode of Harper's Island
- KaBlam!, Nickelodeon TV show
- "Kerblam!", Doctor Who TV episode
- Boom (disambiguation)
- KA (disambiguation)
