= Theodoor Verstraete =

Belgian Realist painter and printmaker

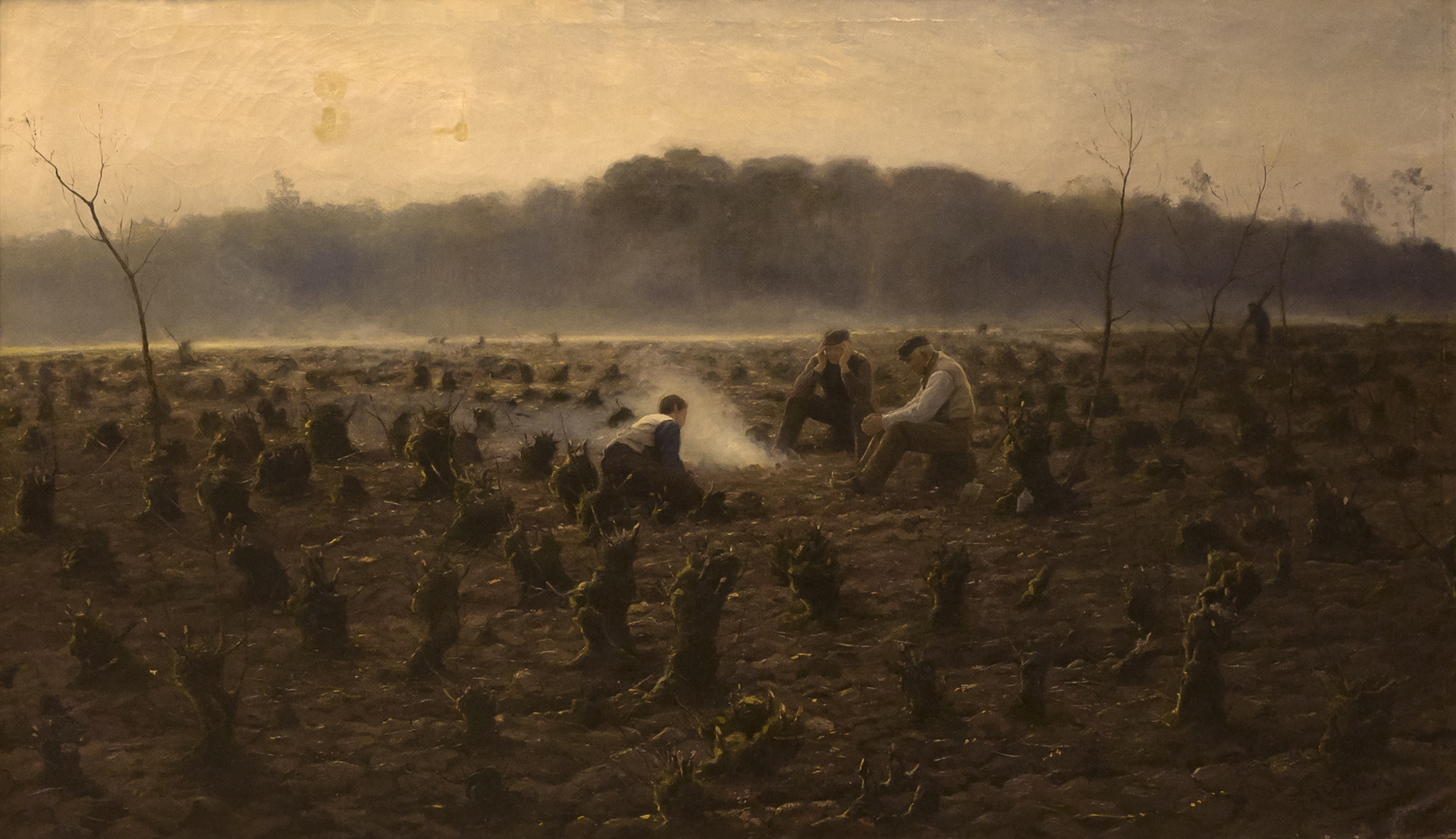
The Stumps by Verstraete, c. 1890

Theodoor Verstraete (5 January 1850 – 8 January 1907), also spelled Theodor Verstraete and Théodore Verstraete, was a Belgian Realist painter and printmaker who is known for his landscapes depicting life in the countryside as well as his paintings of the Belgian coastal landscape. He has been called the 'poet of rural life' who depicted the humble life of the people in the countryside with empathy.

== Life ==
Verstraete was born in Ghent, Belgium, on 5 January 1850. His father and mother moved to Antwerp in 1852. His father was the second conductor of the 'Nationaal Toneel" (National Theatre) in Antwerp while his mother, Julie Verstraete-Lacquet, was a popular actress. The family later moved to Brussels. Verstraete initially showed an inclination for music and accompanied his parents on their theatre tours including a trip in 1860 to the Netherlands. He was also keen on drawing. In 1867 he commenced his studies at the Royal Academy of Fine Arts of Antwerp. In the graphics department, headed by Jozef Bal, Verstraete developed his drawing skills and also learned the etching technique, which he would use throughout his career.

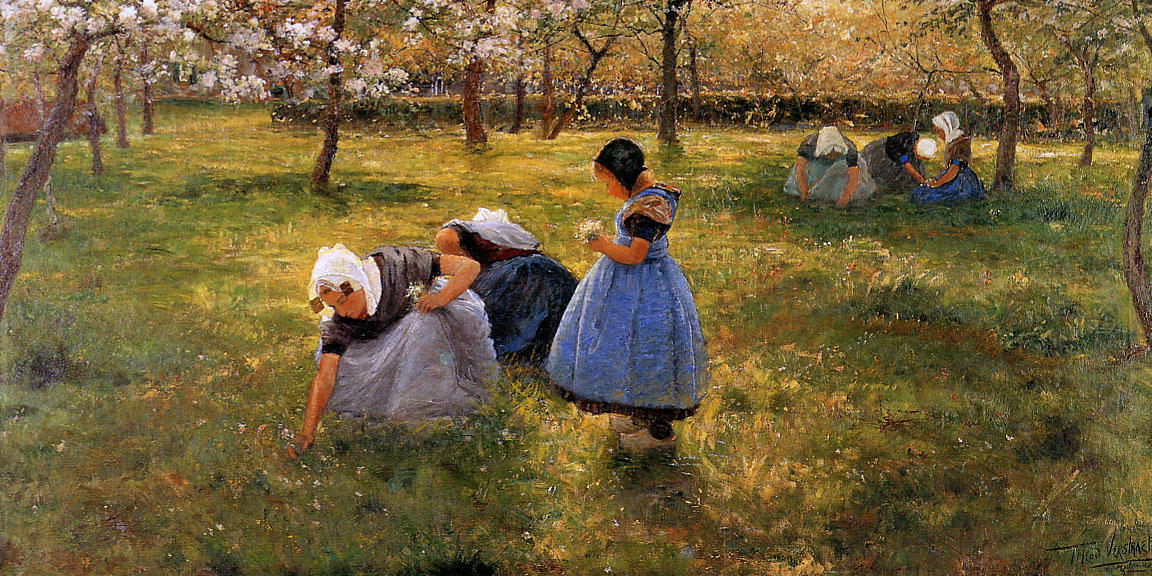
Spring in Schoore

From 1867 he attended the painting class at the Antwerp Academy, which was headed by Jacob Jacobs. The classmates of Verstraete included Emile Claus, Jef Lambeaux, Edgard Farasyn and Henri Houben. From 1873 to 1878 Verstraete attended the free workshop of Jacob Jacobs, which was linked to the Academy. That year he got married. He relied for his finances on aid from his mother as well as his work as a drummer and decorative painter at the theatre. At the time he was living in Brussels.

Theodoor Verstraete showed his first canvases at the Antwerp Salon of 1876 or 1877. From that time onwards, he regularly contributed to exhibitions. He achieved his first success in 1882 with his painting Dusk, which was awarded an honorable mention in Paris and a gold medal in Antwerp.

In 1878 Verstraete left the Academy and went to work the next year in a picturesque house in Brasschaat, near Antwerp. His house was built in the middle of nature in the Campine region of Belgium. From here he traveled around in his caravan to paint the surrounding landscapes. He only visited his family, presumably still living in Brussels, in the weekends. Verstraete was called the 'painter of Brasschaat' and other painters working with him or receiving training from him were considered to be members of the so-called 'School of Brasschaat' of landscape painting. Jan Frans Simons, Frans Van Ballaer and Jules Guiette were deemed to be members of this school. Evert Pieters and Rosa Leigh are also regarded as pupils of Theodoor Verstraete.

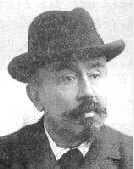
Verstraete, c. 1896

In 1883 Verstraete was one of the 20 original members of the group of the 'Les XX' (The Twenty), an association of 20 progressive artists in Brussels. He left the group two years later, probably because of his more conservative style, which was not in line with what the other artists in the group were creating. Verstraete was in 1883 a co-founder of the Antwerp group of artists called 'Wees U Zelf' ('Be yourself'). The manifest of the group drafted by Piet Verhaert argued for maintaining the tradition. Other members included Frans Van Kuyck, Eugène Joors, Edgard Farasyn and Emile Claus. Verstraete was in 1891 a co-founder in Antwerp of the artist association 'De XIII', which aimed to liberate art of the reigning academism. It planned to organize annual exhibitions (salons) in Antwerp as well as group exhibitions. During its existence the association, which was disbanded in 1899, organized three salons.

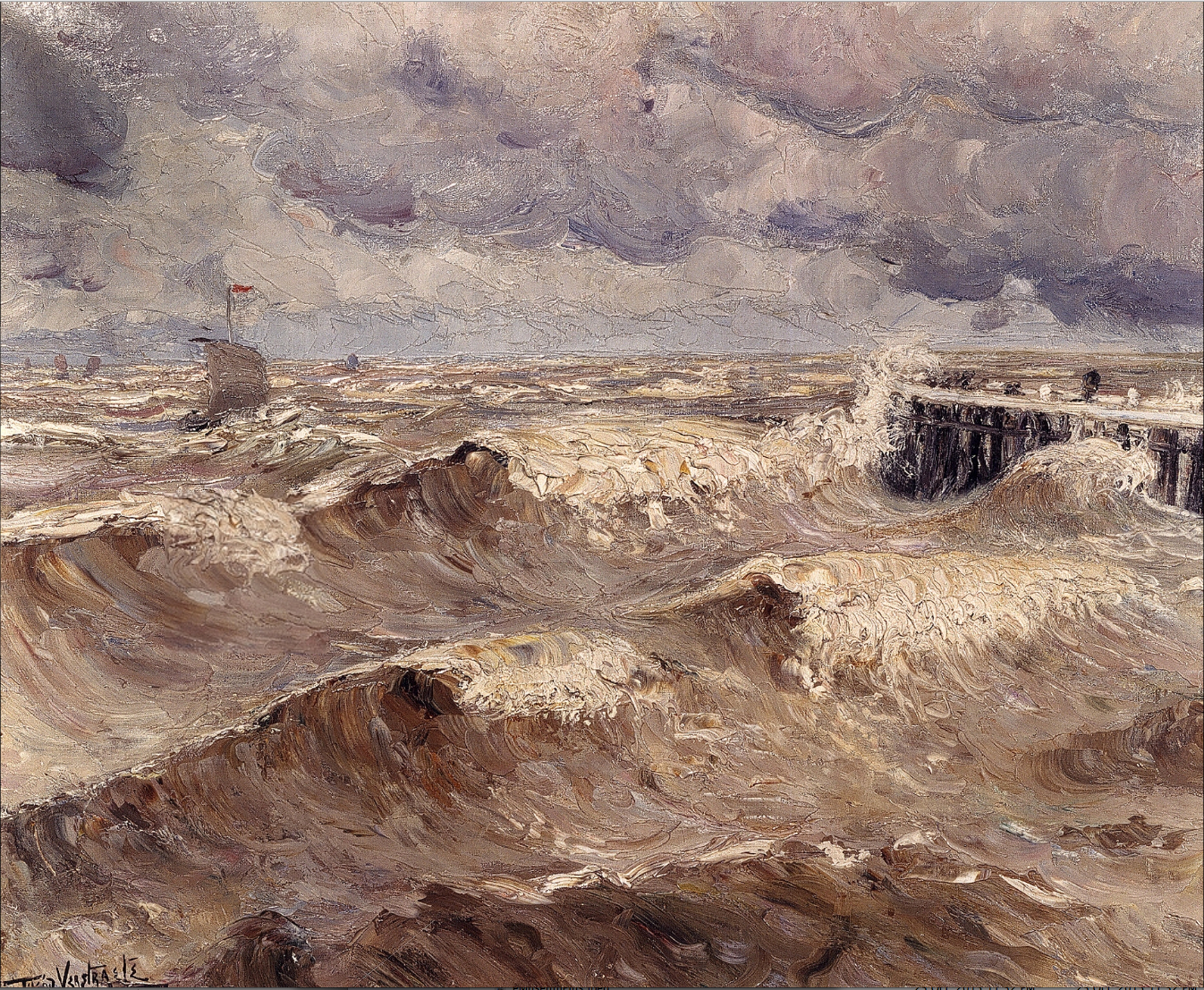
High Tide

The financial situation of Verstraete improved after he was introduced in 1886 to art collector and patron Henri Van Cutsem. Van Cutsem encouraged Verstraete to travel to various places in the Netherlands such as Hansweert, Leiden, Utrecht and Schoore in Zeeland, where he etched and painted. Theodoor Verstraete also spent time in Blankenberge on the Belgian coast where Van Cutsem owned a villa and invited his artist friends to visit. Verstraete was fascinated with the mobile spectacle of water and air near the sea. While the relationship with Van Cutsem resulted in a considerable improvement of Verstraete's finances, he was in 1893 struck by a stroke, which possibly led to blindness and inability to speak. This signaled the end of the artistic career of Verstraete.

The destitute Verstraete could thereafter only survive financially through the support of his patron Henri Van Cutsem, who gave him after 1904 a monthly stipend. Van Cutsem also regularly bought from Verstraete paintings, which he later returned to the artist. The retrospective exhibitions of 1895 in Zaal Verlat and in 1906 organized by Kunst van Heden (Art of Today), which also included works by Willem Linnig the Younger, were also a welcome source of income.

== Death and legacy ==
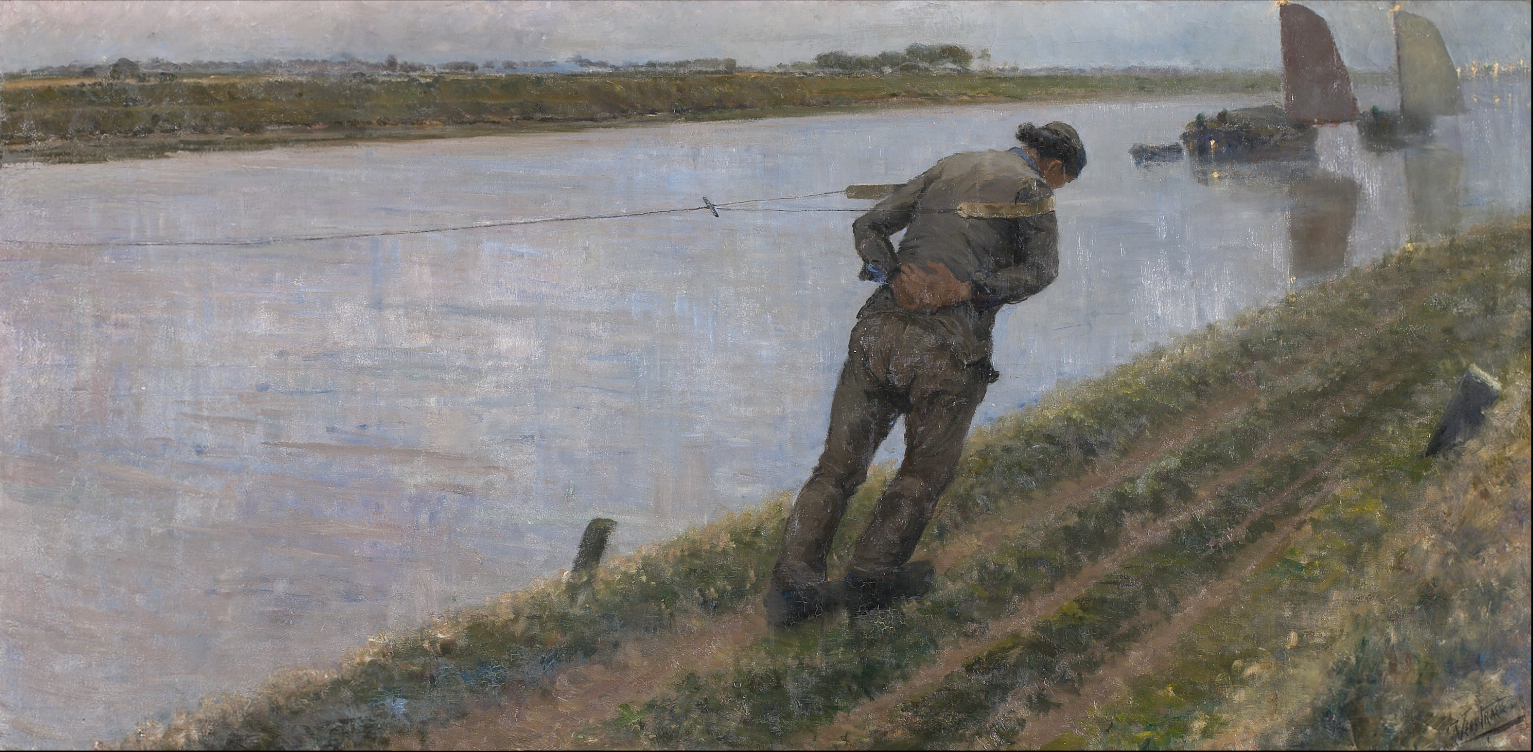
The Hauler

During his last years Theodoor Verstraete continued to suffer from ill health and mental disability. After he died on 8 January 1907 he was interred next to Hendrik Conscience at the honorary park of the Kiel cemetery in Antwerp. On 15 April 1942 his remains were transferred to the honorary park of the Schoonselhof cemetery in Antwerp. In 1909 a statue and monument of Verstraete was erected in the Stadspark ('City park') of Antwerp. It was sculpted and donated by Guillaume Charlier.

== Work ==
Theodoor Verstraete painted realist landscapes with figures, village scenes and animal scenes. He initially employed a dull palette but gradually started using brighter tones. Verstraete worked in oils as well as in watercolors and also produced many etchings. His work was influenced by the realism of Jean-François Millet as well as other members of the French Barbizon school.

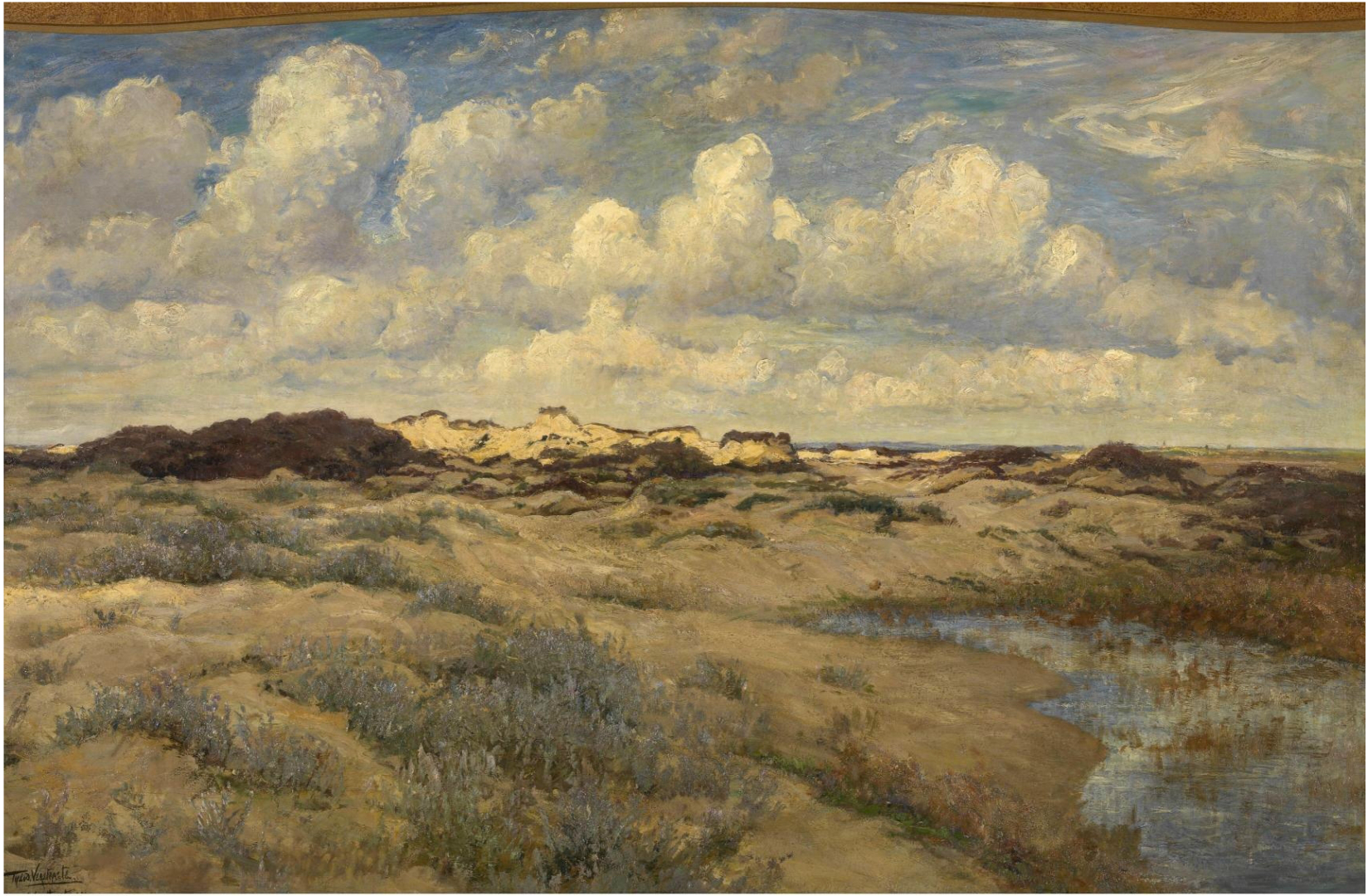
After the Rain

Verstraete was part of a group of Belgian painters who took refuge from the complexity of urban life to look for simplicity, purity and naturalness in the pre-industrial countryside. They saw the countryside as a serene world, which stood in sharp contrast to their familiar urban environment. There they looked for quiet and contemplation and identified themselves with the simple villagers. They had a particular fondness for the Campine region, which was relatively isolated and had been untouched by industrialization. Some of these artists, such as Frans Van Leemputten and Verstraete who both worked in the Campine, depicted the rural reality from their own urban background and viewpoint.

In his early works created in Brasschaat Theodoor Verstraete was driven by his social consciousness and compassion with the villagers. Verstraete described his works as expressions of his feelings of compassion with, and admiration for, the peasants who had to struggle with the ungrateful earth for their survival. He painted sad impressions of resignedly working, deeply devout peasants in a melancholic environment. These melancholic early works, such as After the funeral (1876–1880, Royal Museums of Fine Arts of Belgium), express in their gloomy atmosphere the poverty of the peasants and their submissiveness to the land. The works of this period show subjects that allowed Verstraete to give free rein to his urge for poetic dreaminess and sentimentality.

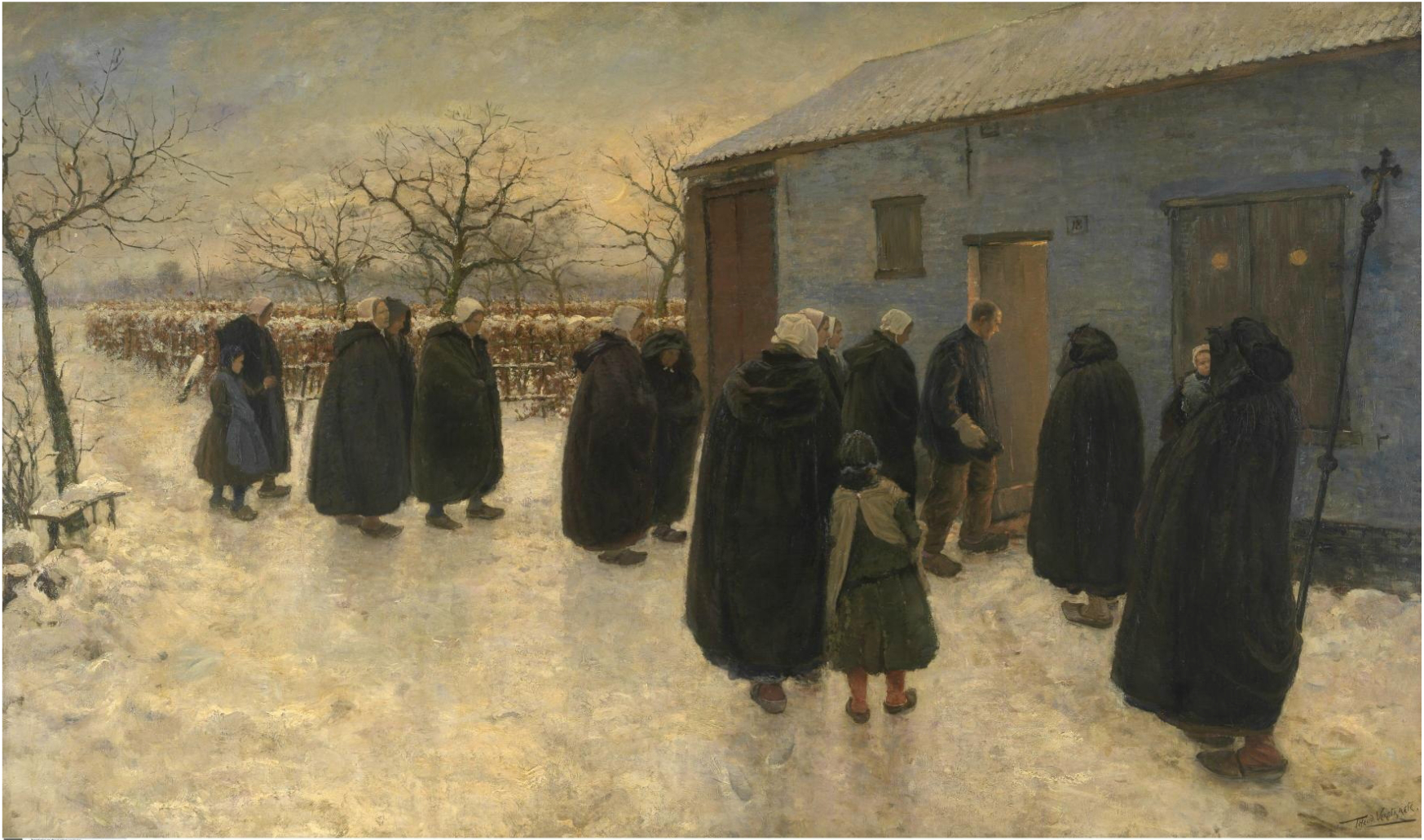
To the Vigil

After Verstraete started working in Zeeland in the Netherlands and at the coast during the period from 1886 to 1890, his work lost its earlier gloominess. Rather than evening or winter scenes or impoverished figures, he painted his landscapes and figures in a clear palette, in full sunlight. The totally different atmosphere reflects to a certain extent the differences between the Campine and Zeeland landscapes. The later work of Verstraete abandoned its sentimental touch and gave more objective, neutral depictions of some of the subjects he treated earlier. This is shown in works such as To the vigil (1889–1890, Royal Museum of Fine Arts Antwerp). The composition depicts male and female peasants walking towards a farmhouse to pray for someone who has died there. The dimensions of this painting are particularly large: 172 cm high and 294 cm wide. The subject matter of Verstraete also changed and he started treating more prosaic subjects such as a ship hauler, a peasant couple near the barrier of the barnyard and a gardener crouching near some flower pots.
