= Boom (surname) =

Boom is a Dutch surname meaning "tree" (Dutch pronunciation: [boːm]). It and the form De Boom can be of metaphoric origin, indicating a robust person ("like a tree"). Alternatively it may be a shortened version of names like Van der Boom or Ten Boom, meaning from/at the tree, boom barrier or warp beam. "Boom" is also regularly chosen as a surname in stage names. People with the name include:

- Bert Boom (born 1938), Dutch track cyclist
- Boudewijn Karel Boom (1903–1980), Dutch botanist
- Claria Horn Boom (born 1969), American (Kentucky) judge
- Cornelis Boom (died 1579), Dutch landowner and shipbuilder
- Irma Boom (born 1960), Dutch graphic designer
- Karel Boom (1858–1939), Belgian painter
- Lars Boom (born 1985), Dutch racing cyclist
- Max de Boom (born 1996), Dutch football winger
- Peter Boom (1936–2011), Dutch-born Italian actor
- Ulrich Boom (born 1947), German Roman Catholic bishop

As a stage name

- Barry Boom (born 1960s), British reggae singer Paul Robinson
- Benny Boom (born 1971), American music video and film director Benny Douglas
- Dionté Boom (born 1991), American rapper-producer Ervin Dionté Harris
- Nando Boom (born 1960s), Panamanian singer Fernando Brown
- Paddy Boom (born 1968), American drummer Patrick Seacor
- Taka Boom (born 1954), American R&B singer Yvonne Stevens

Van Boom / Van den Boom / Van der Boom

- Herman van den Boom (born 1950), Belgian photographer
- Claire van der Boom (born 1983), Australian actress
- Jeroen van der Boom (born 1972), Dutch singer
- Johan van Boom (1807–1872), Dutch-born Swedish pianist and composer
- J Boom (born 1991), Canadian hip hop blues musician and producer

== See also ==
- Ten Boom, three members of a Dutch family who helped save Jews during the Holocaust
