= Edgard Farasyn =

Belgian painter, watercolorist, engraver and etcher (1858–1938)

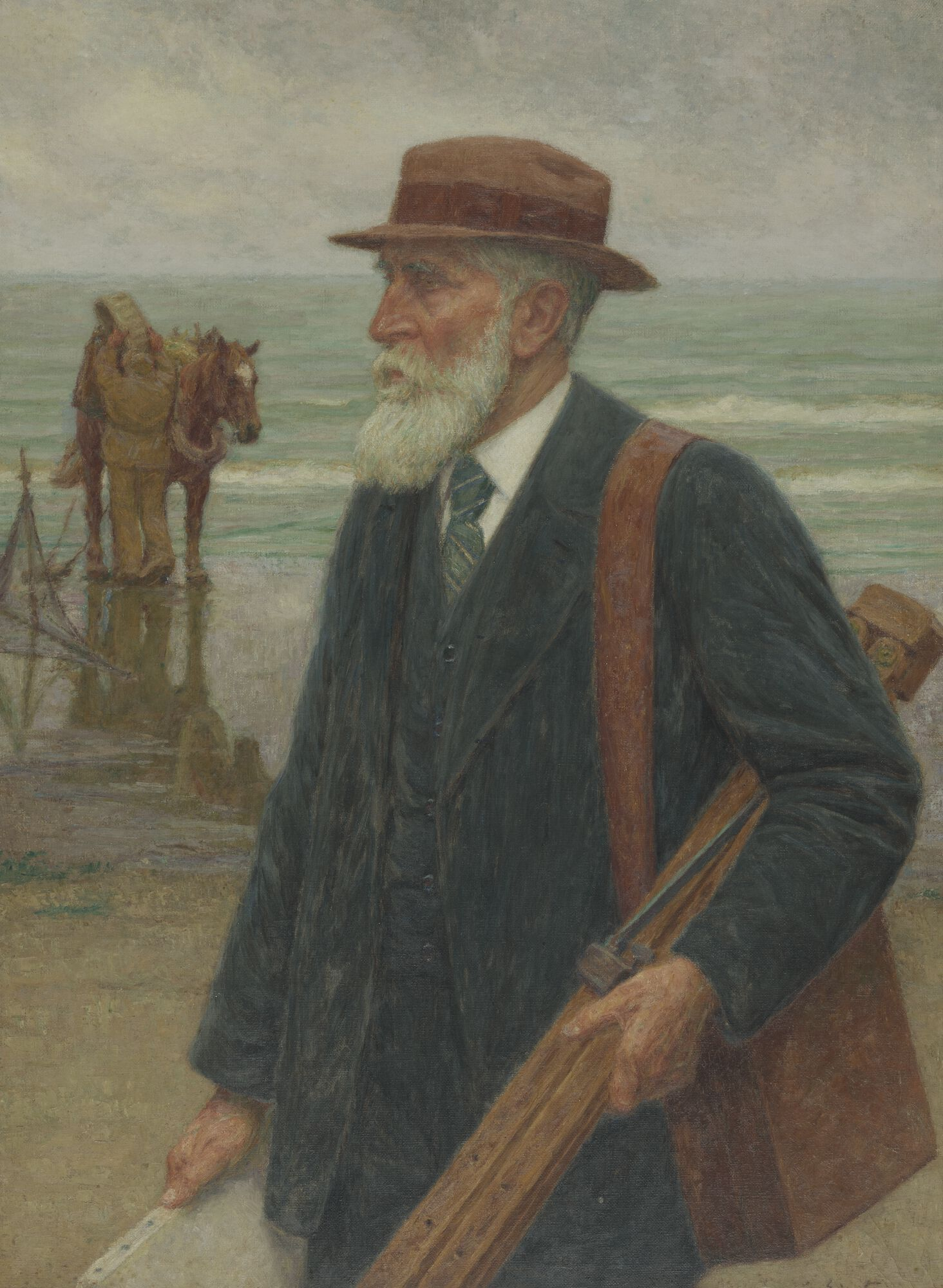
- Self-portrait (date unknown)
- Born: Edgard Pierre Jozef Farasyn; 14 July 1858; Antwerp, Belgium
- Died: 2 March 1938 (aged 79); Antwerp, Belgium
- Education: Royal Academy of Fine Arts of Antwerp
- Occupations: Painter, engraver and etcher

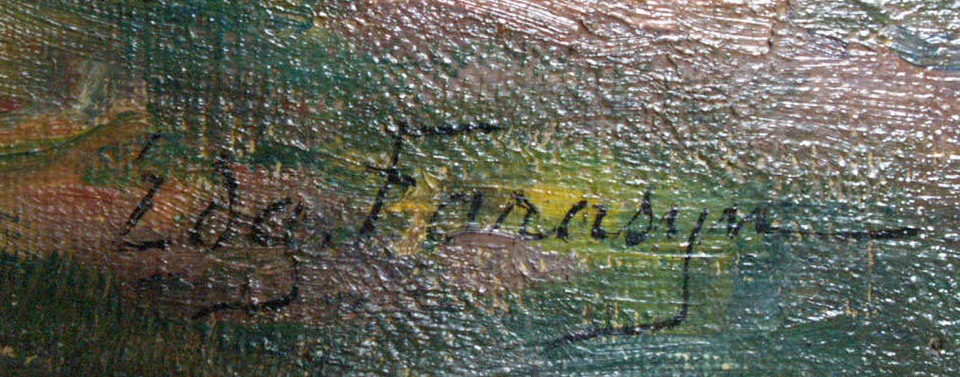
Edgard Farasyn; Signature

Edgard Pierre Jozef Farasyn (also spelled Farasijn; 14 August 1858, in Antwerp – 22 March 1938, in Antwerp) was a Belgian painter, watercolorist, engraver and etcher who specialized in seascapes, landscapes, genre scenes and interior portraits. In his later life, he became interested in depicting fishermen.

== Life and work ==
He received his artistic training at the Royal Academy of Fine Arts of Antwerp, where he studied under Nicaise de Keyser. In 1885, he became a teacher at the Academy. Six years later, he was a founding member of the secessionist group De XIII and was also active in Weest U Zelve (roughly, Be Yourself), a group devoted to promoting Flemish art.

He initially focused on painting children, but switched to plein air painting after becoming a teacher. He mostly worked in and around Antwerp, but also went to Mol and the Kempen region and occasionally ventured into Zeeland. His early works are mostly done in dark, sombre colors, but his canvas lightened considerably after he visited Koksijde and decided to portray the lives of the fishermen and their families. He also practiced mural painting. Of special note is the painting Optocht van de rederijkerskamer "De Violieren" in 1539 (Procession of the Chamber of Rhetoric "The Violieren" in 1539), in the staircase hallway of the Antwerp Town Hall, which he executed in 1899 at the invitation of Frans Van Kuyck; part of a larger project of historical murals which also included works by Piet Verhaert, Edouard de Jans, Karel Boom and Henri Houben.

He gave many exhibitions, winning awards at the Sydney International Exhibition (1879) and the Brussels International (1897). He retired from teaching in 1924.

== Gallery ==
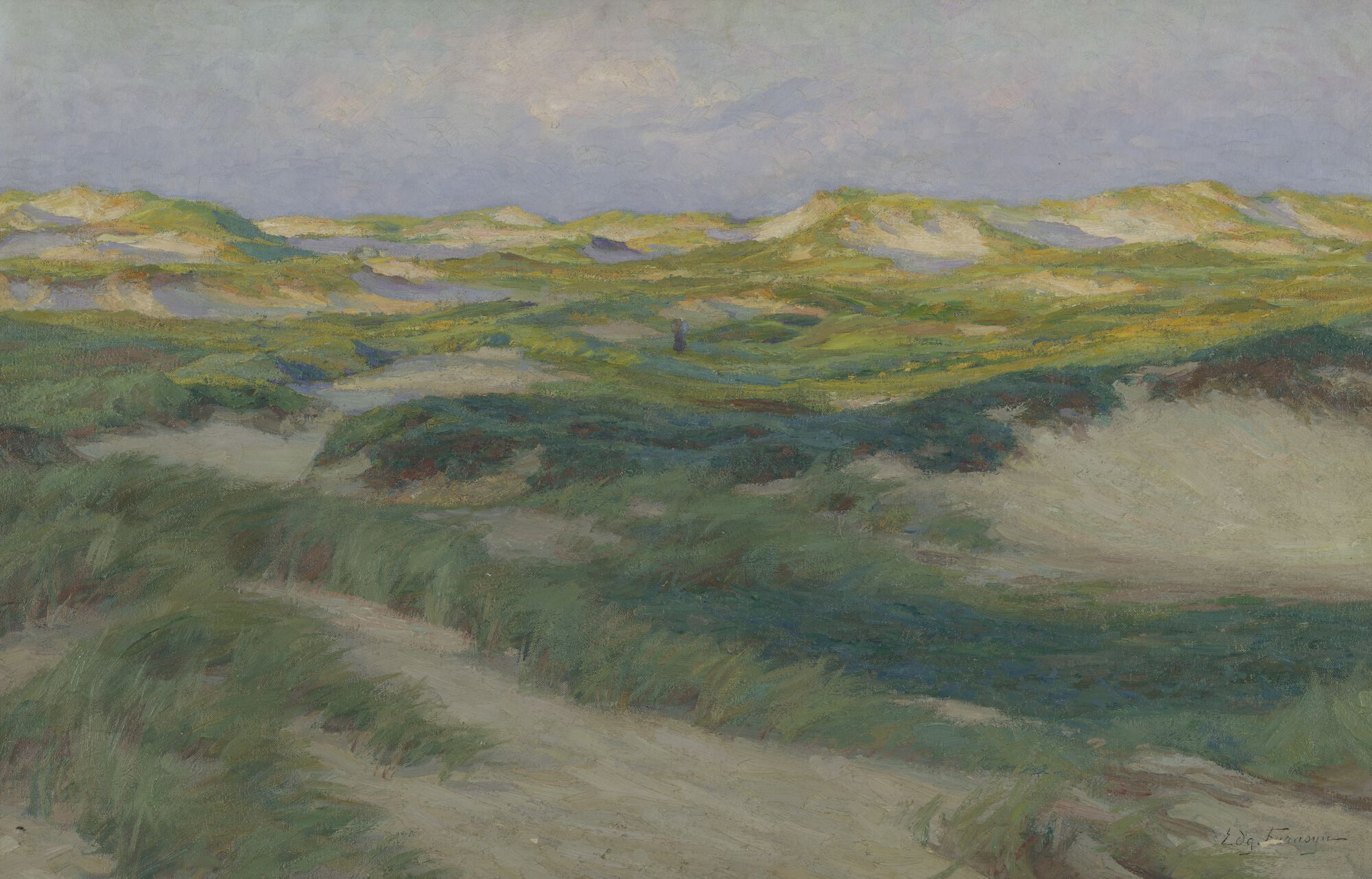
Painting of a fisherwoman in dune landscape in the NAVIGO National Fisheries Museum Oostduinkerke

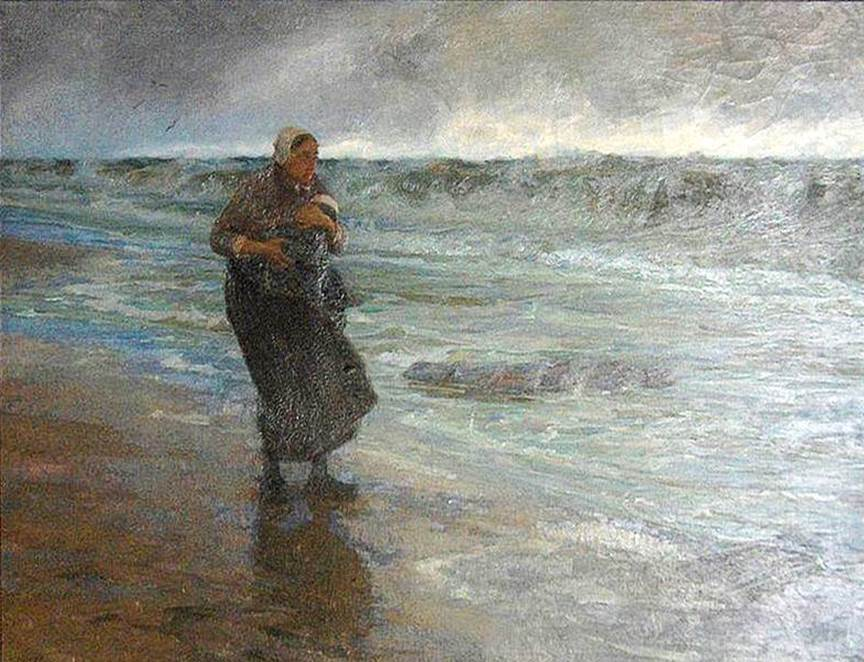
Fisherman's Wife with Child on the Beach
(date unknown)

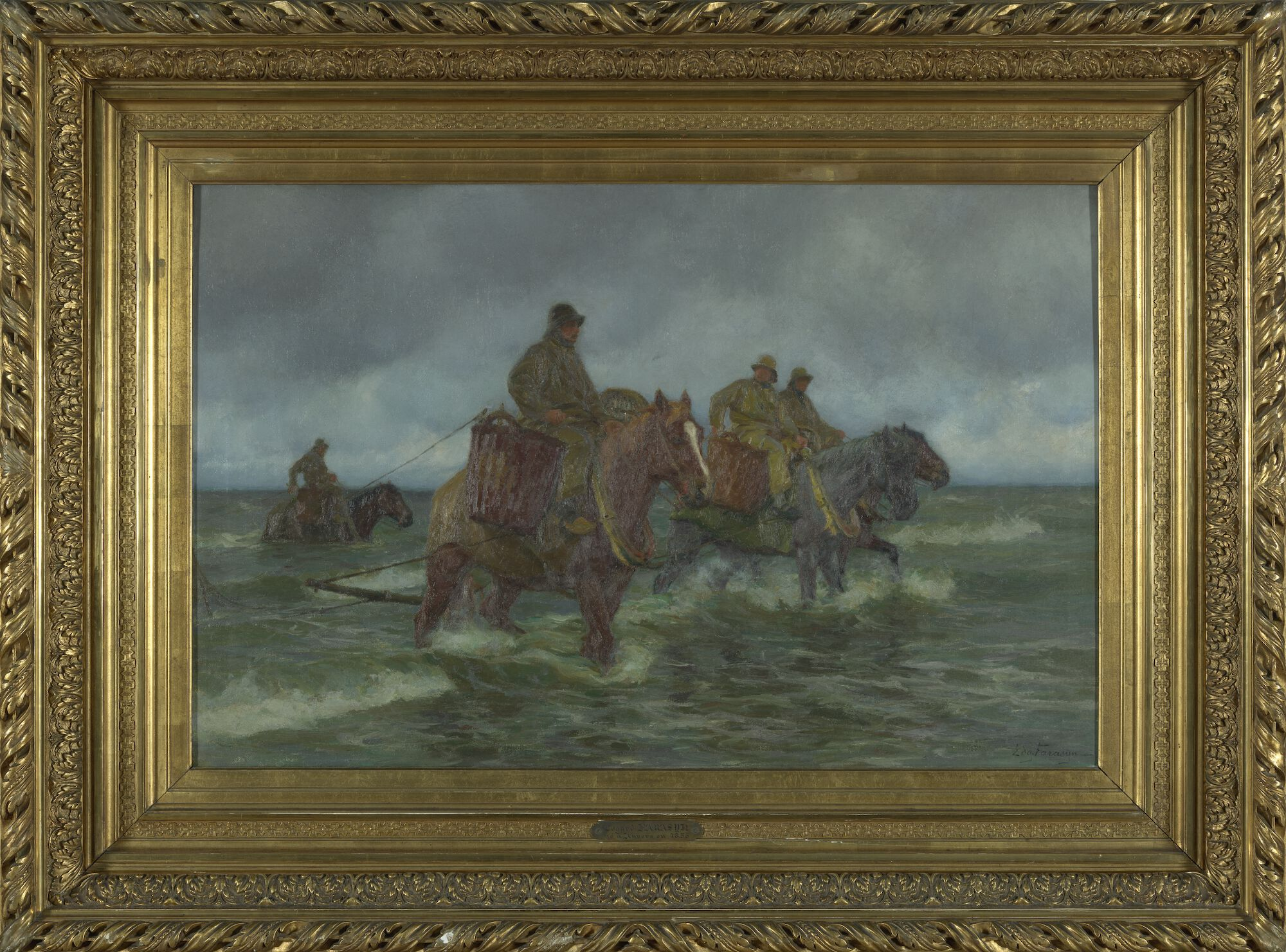
Horse fishermen in the sea in NAVIGO

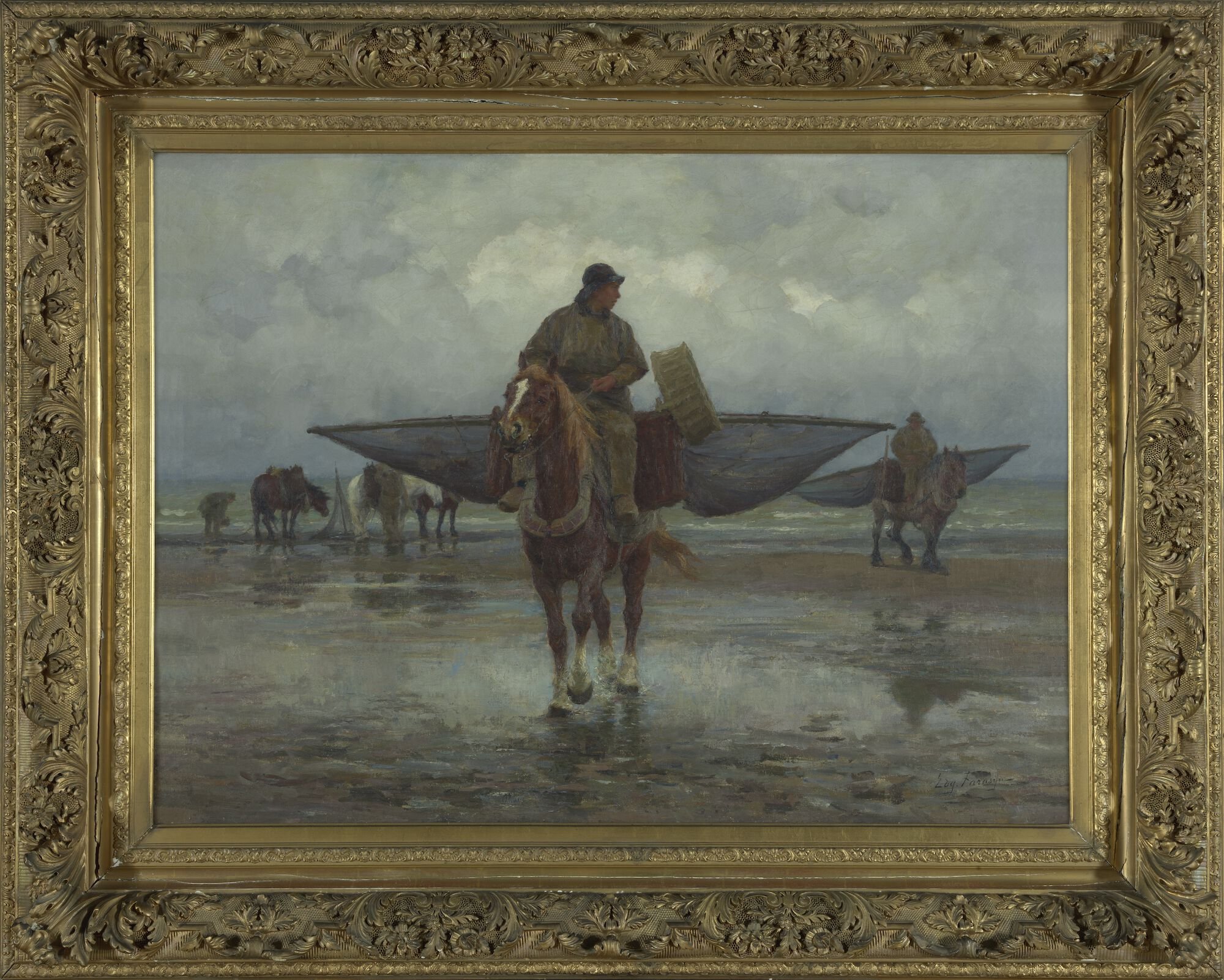
Horse fishermen on the beach in NAVIGO

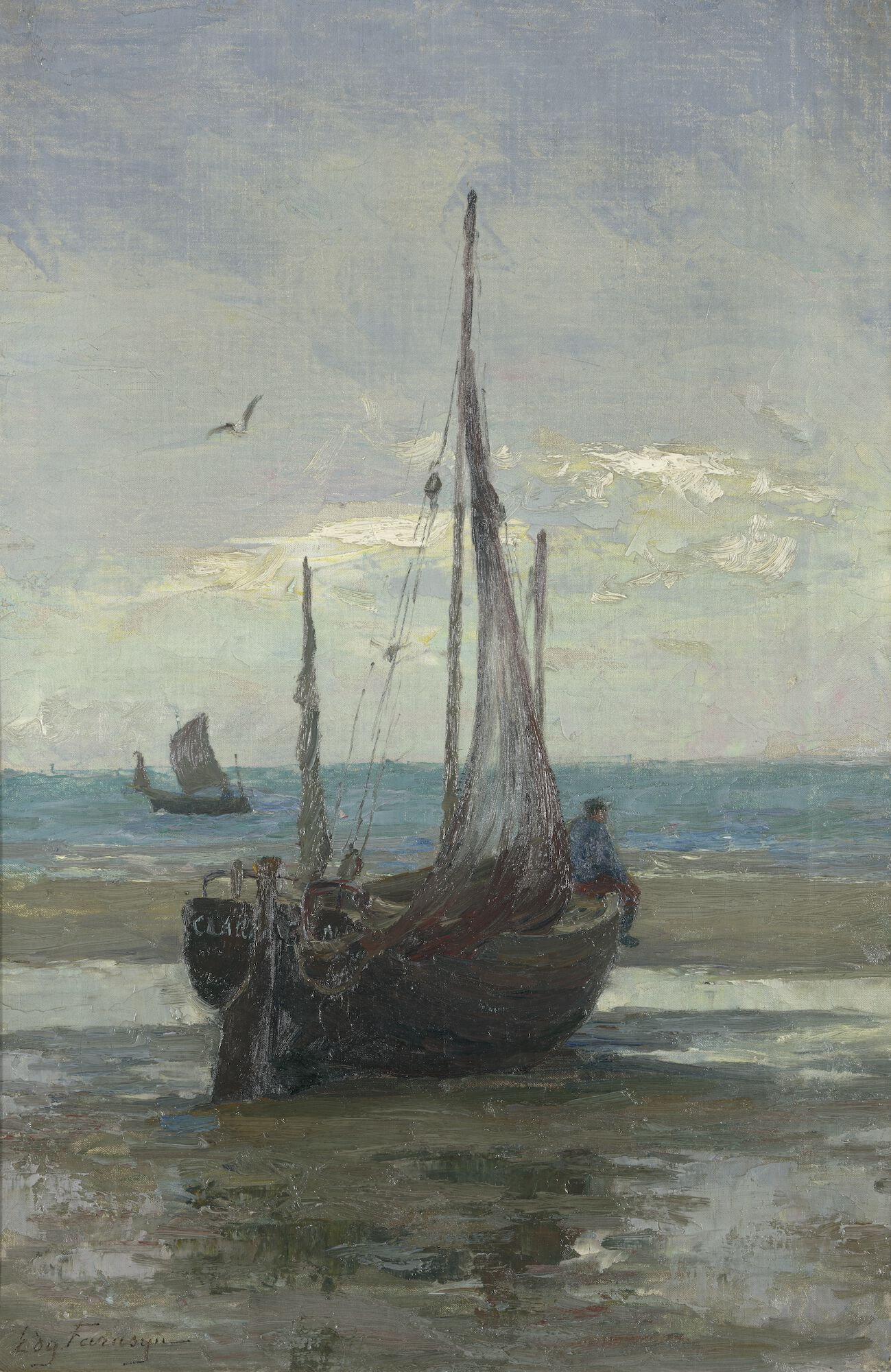
Pannepot on the beach in NAVIGO

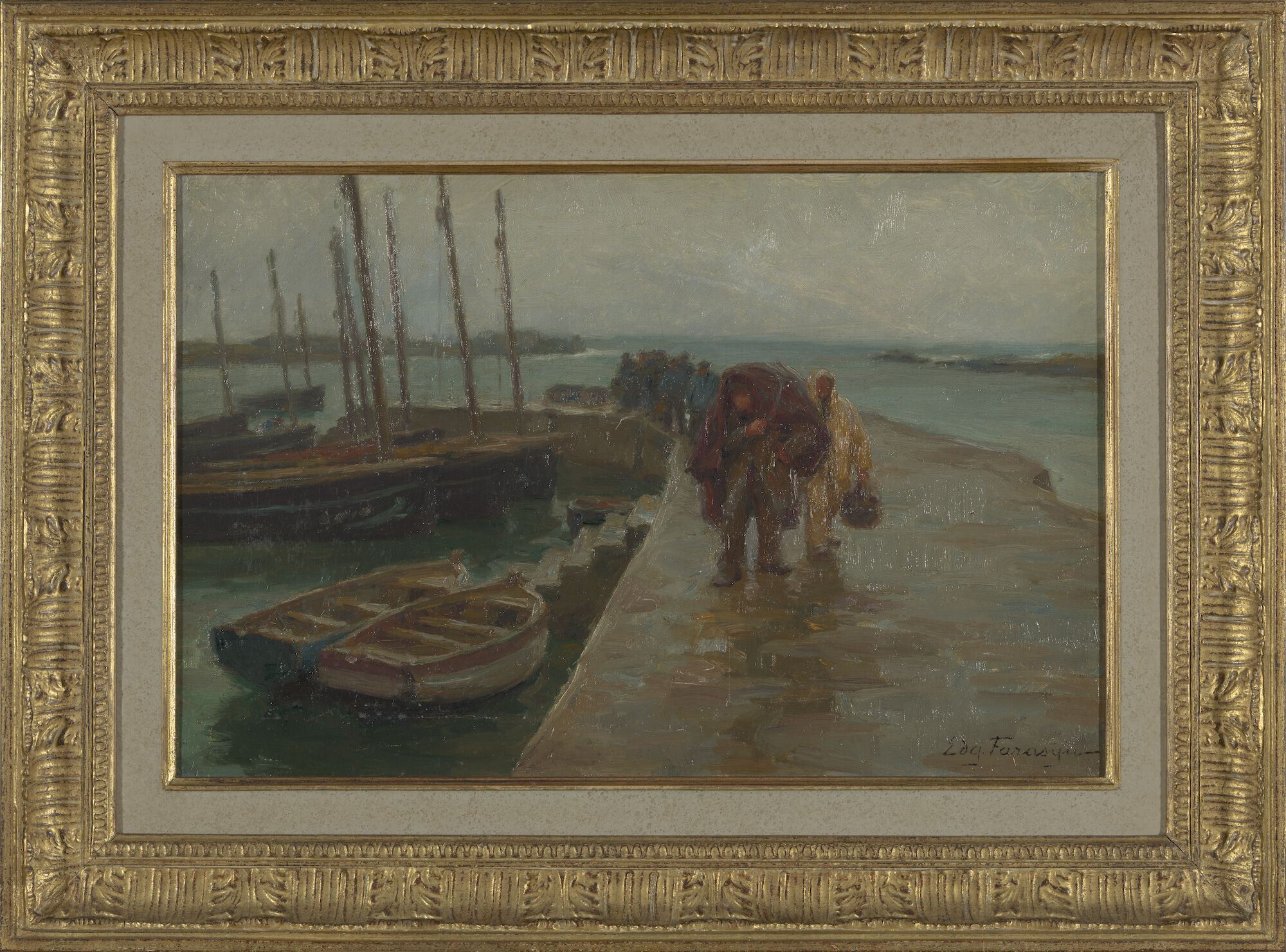
Fishermen on the harbor head in NAVIGO

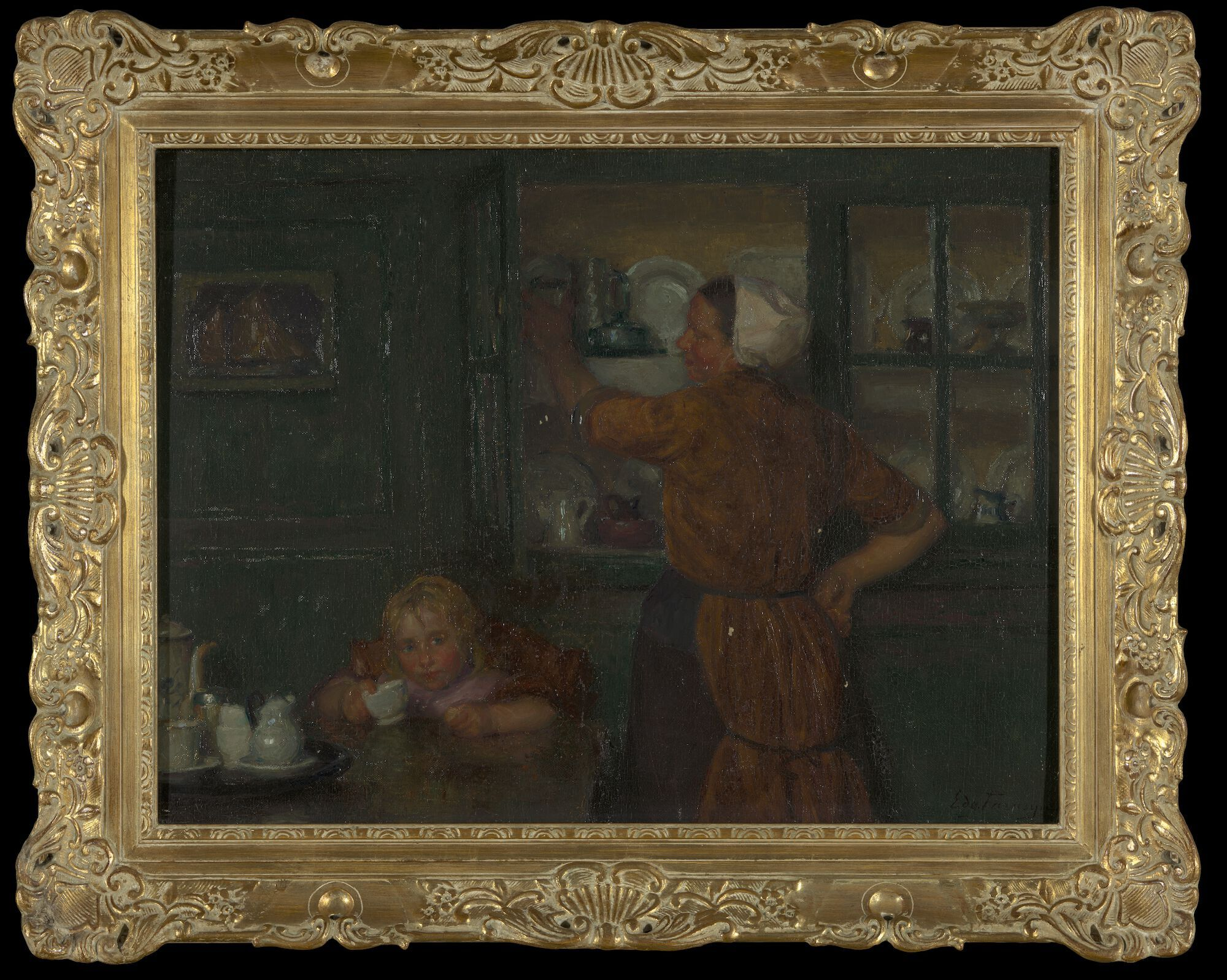
Woman with child in the living room

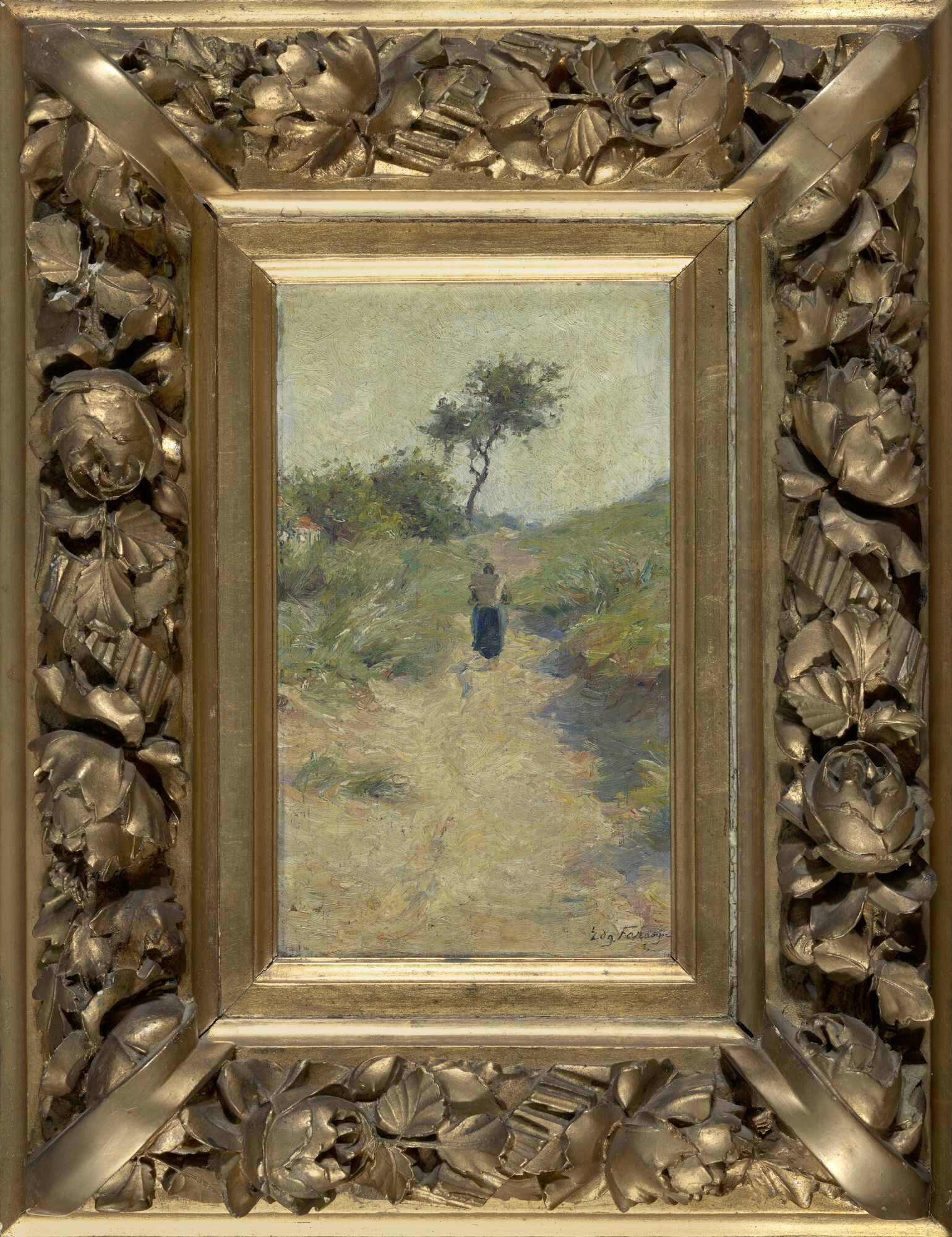
Fisherwoman with basket in dune path in NAVIGO National Fisheries Museum

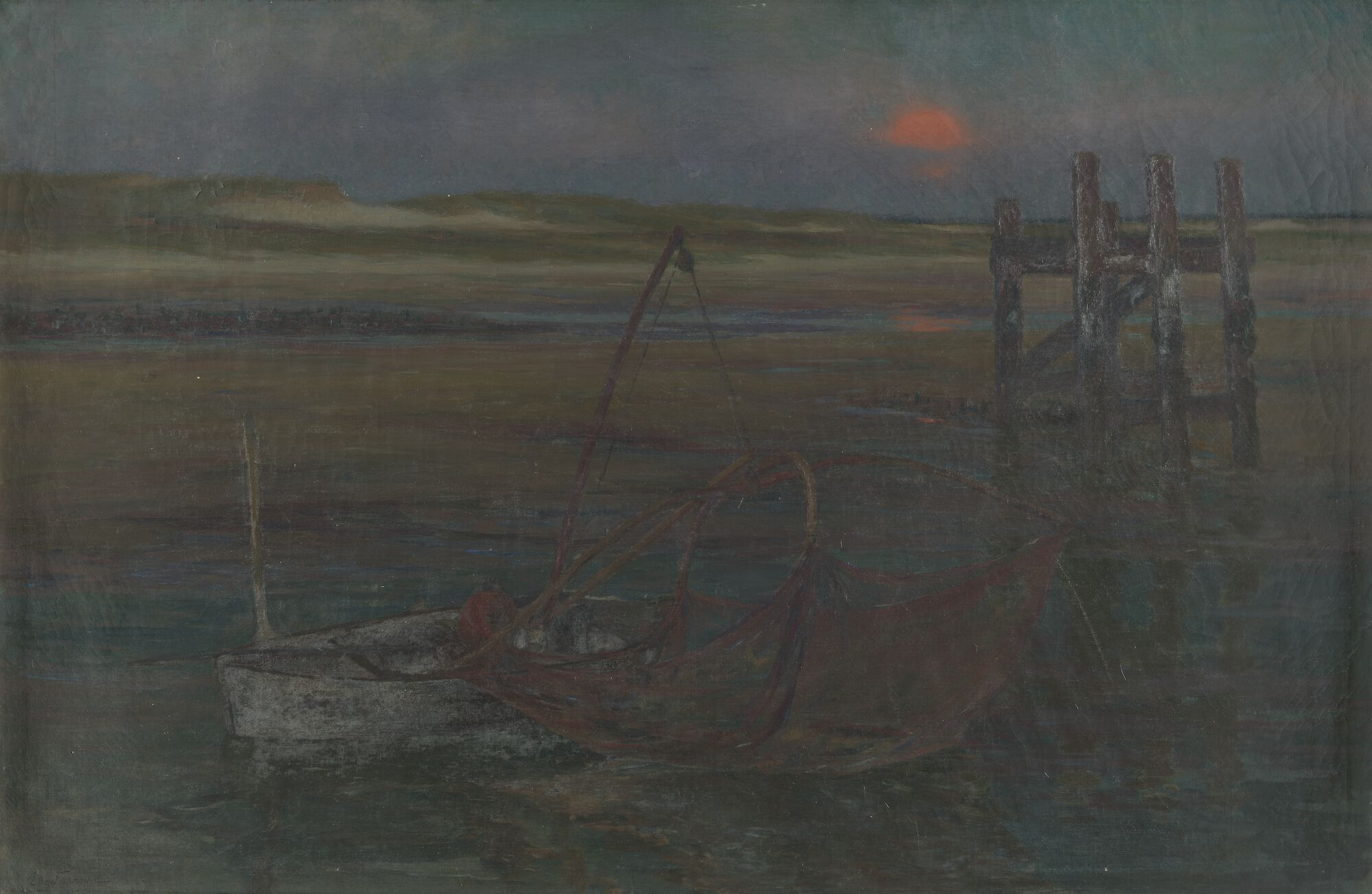
Eel barge with cross net in NAVIGO

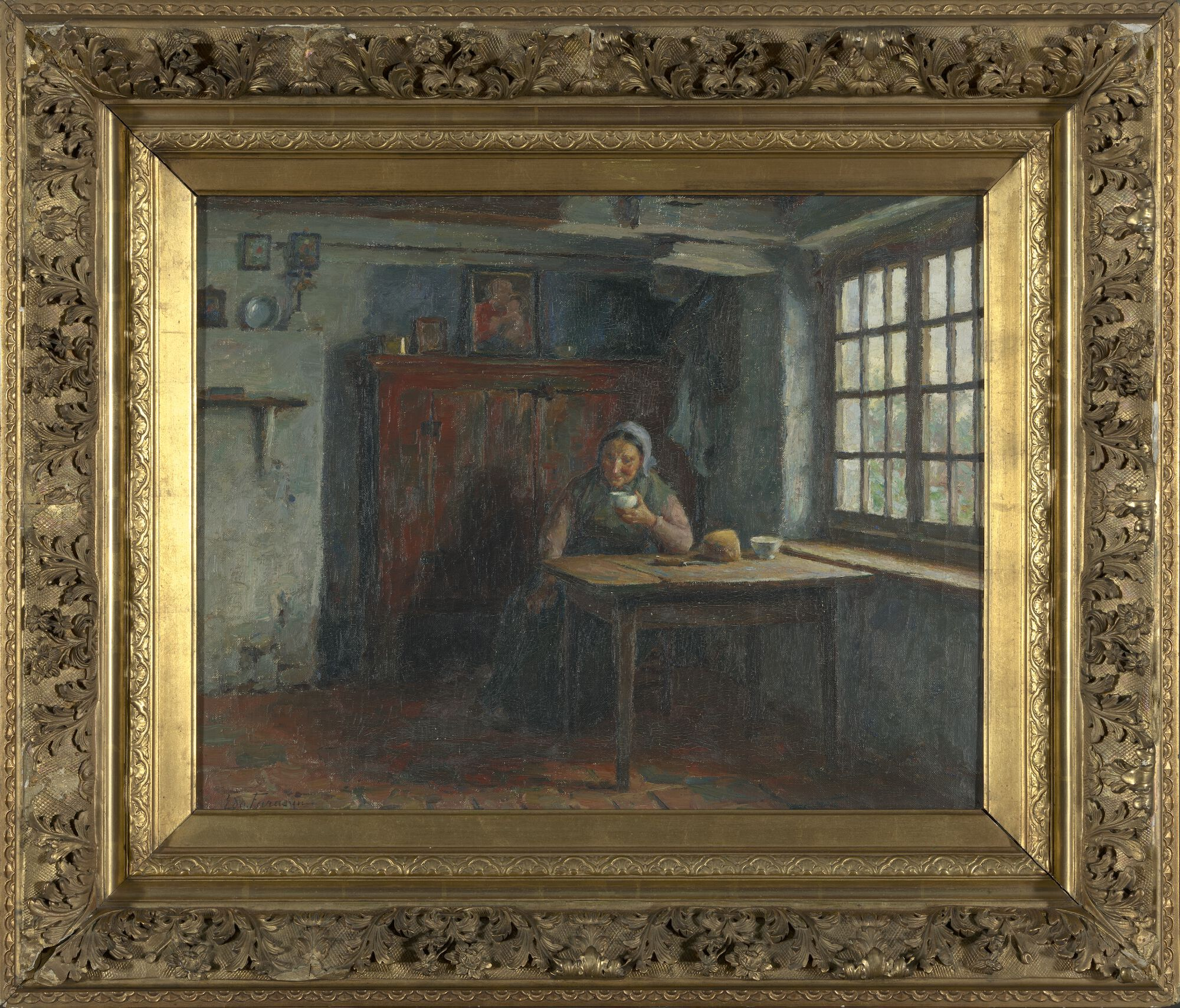
Interior with fisherwomen in NAVIGO

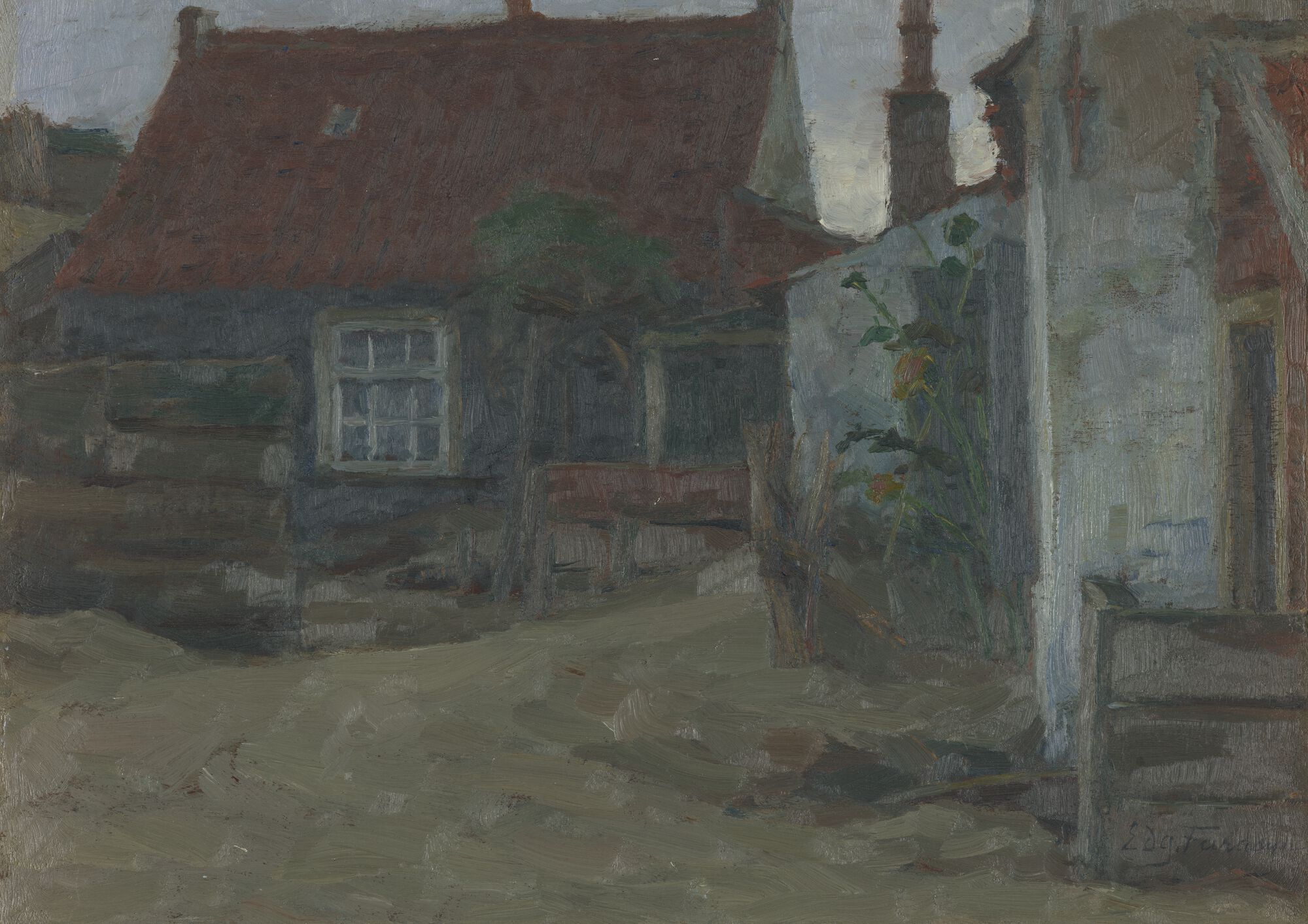
Alley with fisherman's house in NAVIGO

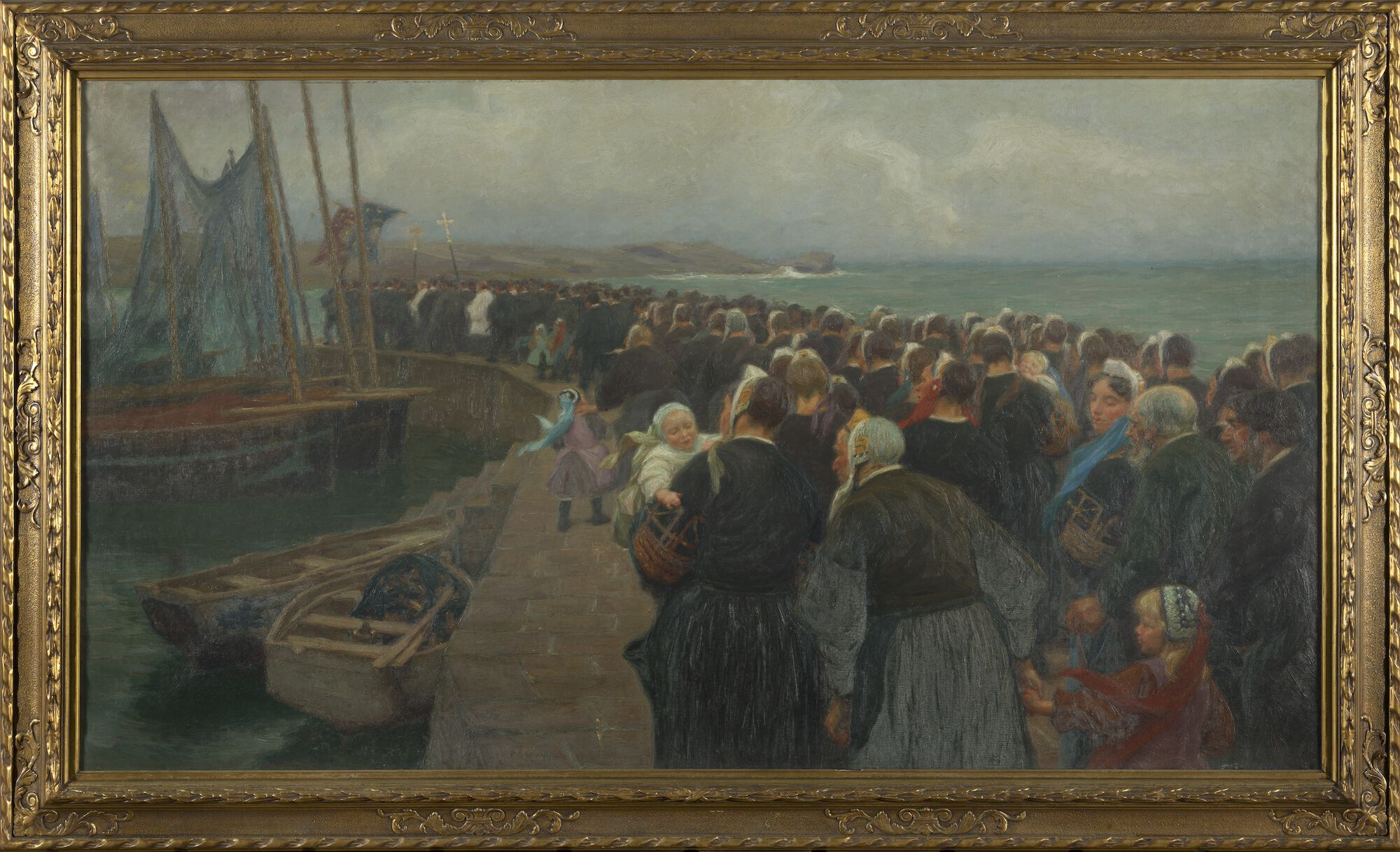
Procession 'Pardon' and Brittany in NAVIGO

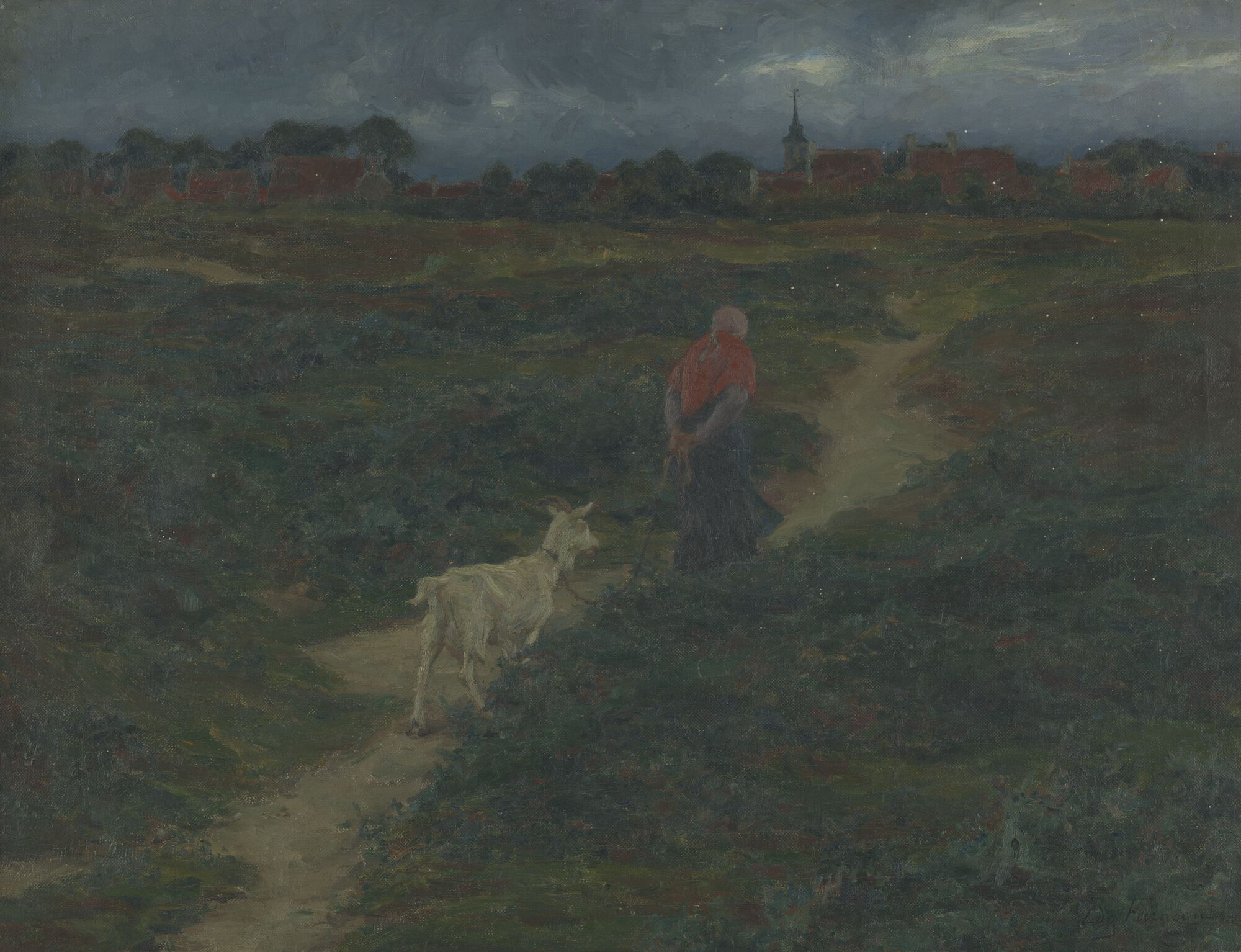
Woman with goat in the dunes in NAVIGO

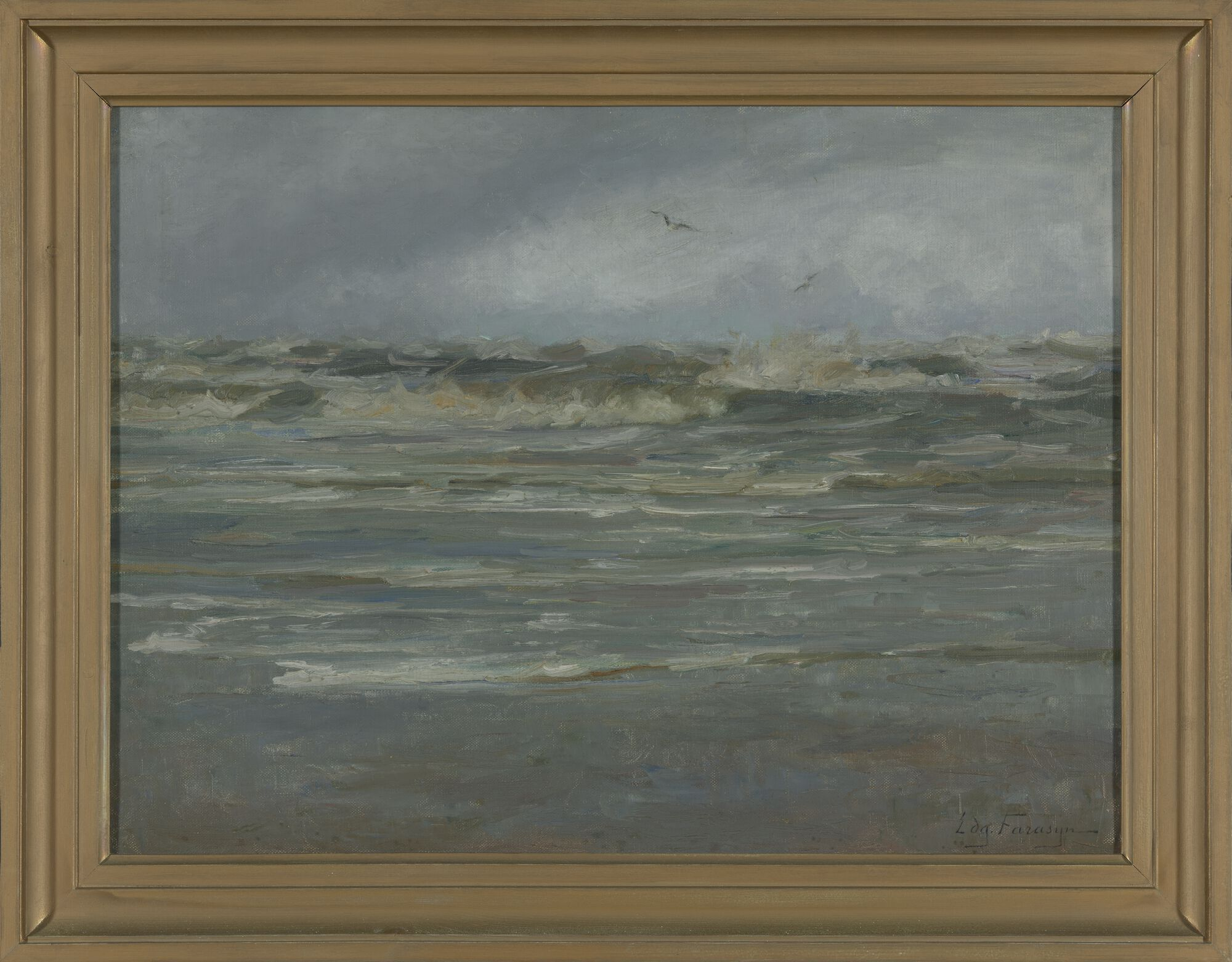
The Wild sea in NAVIGO

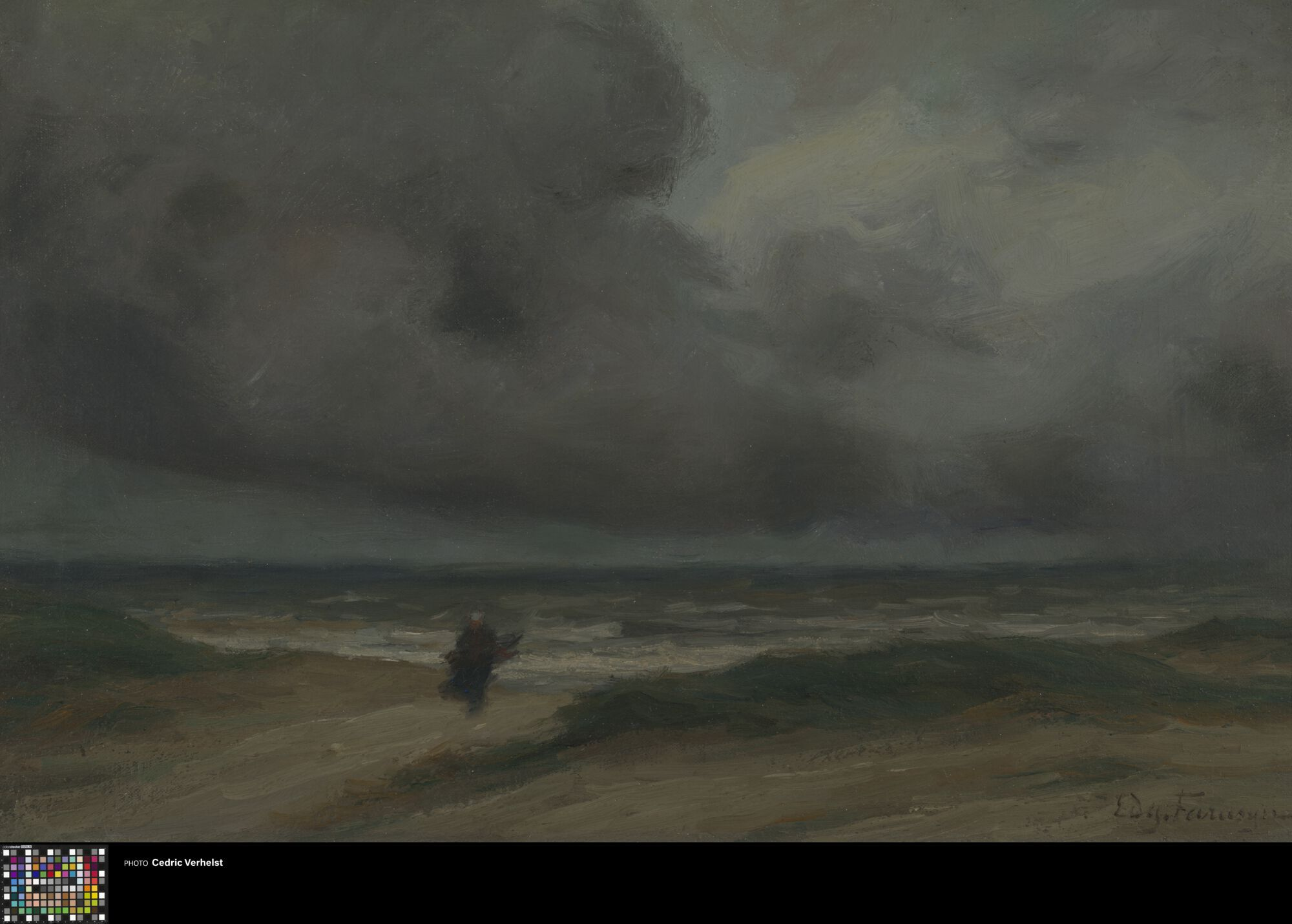
Fisherwoman on the beach in NAVIGO
