= Boom Boom =

Boom Boom, Boom Boom Boom, or Boom Boom Boom Boom may refer to:

== Nickname or stage name ==
=== People ===
- Boom Boom (nickname)
- Boom Boom Bundy, early ring name for American professional wrestler King Kong Bundy (1955–2019)
- Sister Boom Boom (1955–2012), American drag queen and astrologer
- Lady Boom Boom, French-Canadian drag queen

=== Characters ===
- Tabitha Smith or Boom Boom, a Marvel comic book superheroine
- Freddie "Boom Boom" Washington, played by Lawrence Hilton-Jacobs in the TV series Welcome Back, Kotter
- Luther "Boom Boom" Jackson, in the film The Fortune Cookie
- Boom Boom, a fictional character in the Mario franchise
- Sonic "Boom Boom" Renaldi, a character in the Speed Racer film adaptation

== Film and television ==
- Boom Boom (film), a 1936 Looney Tunes short film
- Boom boom (1990 film), a Fernando Guillén Cuervo film
- "Boom Boom!", catchphrase of Basil Brush, a British TV character
- "Boom Boom!", a type of Sting (percussion) to punctuate a joke.
- Boom Boom, Out Go the Lights, 1981 British TV comedy special with Alexei Sayle

== Music ==
- Boom Boom Radio, a jazz oriented Albanian radio station
- Boom Boom, a type of Caribbean drum used in the music of the Virgin Islands
- Boom Boom Band, band of musician Willie Alexander

=== Albums ===
- Boom! Boom! Boom!, an album by Kelley Deal 6000
- Boom Boom, a 1992 album by John Lee Hooker
- Boom Boom, a 2003 album and a tune by Norwegian/Swedish jazz group Atomic
- Boom Boom Chi Boom Boom, a 1988 album by Tom Tom Club

=== Songs ===
- "Boom Boom" (John Lee Hooker song), 1961
- "Boom Boom" (Justice Crew song), 2012
- "Boom Boom" (Mabel song), 1978
- "Boom Boom" (Rye Rye song), 2012
- "Boom Boom" (RedOne song), 2017
- "Boom Boom" (Loboda and Pharaoh song), 2020
- "Boom Boom (Let's Go Back to My Room)", a 1987 song by Paul Lekakis
- "Boom Boom (Heartbeat)", a 2013 Ray Foxx ft. Rachel K Collier song
- "Boom Boom (Out Go the Lights)", a 1979 Pat Travers live single from the album Live! Go for What You Know
- "Boom, Boom", a 2019 song by Akon from El Negreeto
- "Boom Boom", a 2023 song by the Cat Empire from the album Where the Angels Fall
- "Boom Boom", a 2005 song by Cham from Ghetto Story
- "Boom Boom", a 2014 song by Dareysteel
- "Boom Boom", a song by Emmy, Armenia's entry in the 2011 Eurovision Song Contest
- "Boom Boom", a 2017 Iggy Azalea song from the Pitch Perfect 3: Original Motion Picture Soundtrack album
- "Boom Boom", a 2016 Đông Nhi song featuring Mei
- "Boom Boom", a 1982 song by Nazia and Zoheb from the album Star/Boom Boom
- "Boom Boom!", a 2018 Ayesha Erotica song
- "Boom Boom (Menudo Mix)", a track from the 2001 album Shhh! by Mexican-American cumbia group A.B. Quintanilla y Los Kumbia Kings
- "(I Got That) Boom Boom", from the 2003 album In the Zone by Britney Spears
- "Boom Boom", a song by The Wiggles from The Wiggles Movie Soundtrack
- "Boom Boom", a 2013 song by Brian Cross featuring Inna from the album PopStar

== Other uses ==
- Boom Boom (sculpture), a dinosaur sculpture in New Zealand

== See also ==
- Boom (disambiguation)
- "Boom Boom Boom", a dance song by the Outhere Brothers
- "Boom-Boom-Boom", a 2004 song by Rina Aiuchi
- "Boom, Boom, Boom, Boom!!", a 1999 song by Vengaboys
- "Boom Boom Boom Boom Boom Boom Boom Boom", a 2014 song by Dan Bull
- Boomer (disambiguation)
- "BBoom BBoom", a 2018 song by Momoland
- "Bom Bom", a 2012 song by Sam and the Womp
- "Bomb Bomb", a 2019 song by Kard
- "Baum Baum", a 2023 song by Lali
- Boom Boom Ox, a decorated ox used in Tamil Nadu, India for fortune-telling
