= Karel Boom =

Belgian genre painter, watercolorist and art teacher (1858–1939)

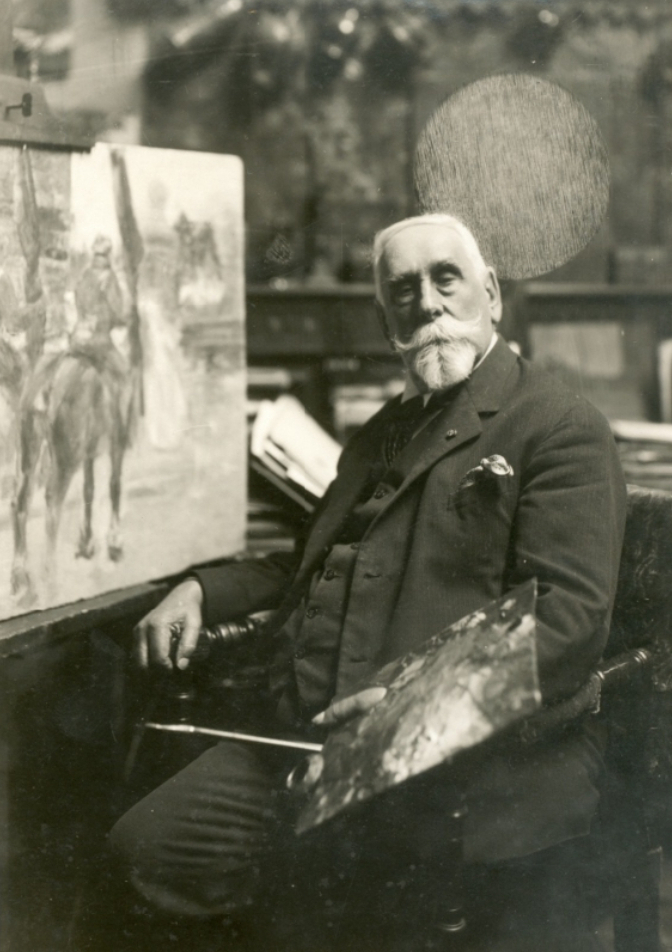
Portrait of Boom in his studio

Karel Boom, also known as Charles Boom, birth name Carolus Richardus Maria Boom (3 April 1858, Hoogstraten – 13 February 1939, Antwerp) was a Belgian painter, watercolorist, printmaker and art educator. He is known for his genre paintings of contemporary figures, portraits as well as his monumental paintings of historical or biblical scenes, often painted as murals in public buildings.

== Life and work ==
He was born in Hoogstraten, the son of Richardus Gerardus Boom, a house painter, and Joanna Catharina Weyler. An avid drawer and painter from a young age, his drawings were shown by a family member to the painter and art teacher Edward Dujardin in Antwerp. Impressed by the 14 year old boy's promising output, Dujardin invited him to come and live in Antwerp. Here he received private lessons of Dujardin and attended the evening classes at the Royal Academy of Fine Arts in Antwerp, which was under the leadership of the Romantic painter Nicaise de Keyser. His teachers included Edward Dujardin, Lucas Victor Schaefels and Charles Verlat. After completing his studies, he worked as a genre and portrait painter in Antwerp. At the age of 21 he held his first exhibition. In 1881 he painted a portrait of Gustaaf Wappers, a leading painter of the Belgian Romantic school.

Inside the walls of Antwerp

At the end of the 19th century, panoramas, large artworks that show a wide, all-encompassing view of a particular subject such as a landscape, military battle or other historical event, were all the rage in Europe. These paintings were typically displayed in a space purposefully built to host the panaromas. Boom's teacher Verlat created a few panoramas with the assistance of his pupil including Boom. In Antwerp Verlat created in 1881 a panoroma of the Battle of Waterloo. This work was 120 meters wide and 10 meters high. The whole scene included plaster figures that made the experience even more life-like. The next year Verlat created for a Russian organisation a panorama showing a Review of Russian soldiers after the signing of the Treaty of San Stefano before Constantinopel. To create this panorama, Verlat and his students Louis Van Engelen, Franz Vinck, Henri Houben and Boom traveled to Moscow. Upon his return to Antwerp after a stay of five months in Moscow, the trip inspired Boom to paint several works with Russian themes. He became a prolific portrait painter who worked for the local patrician families.

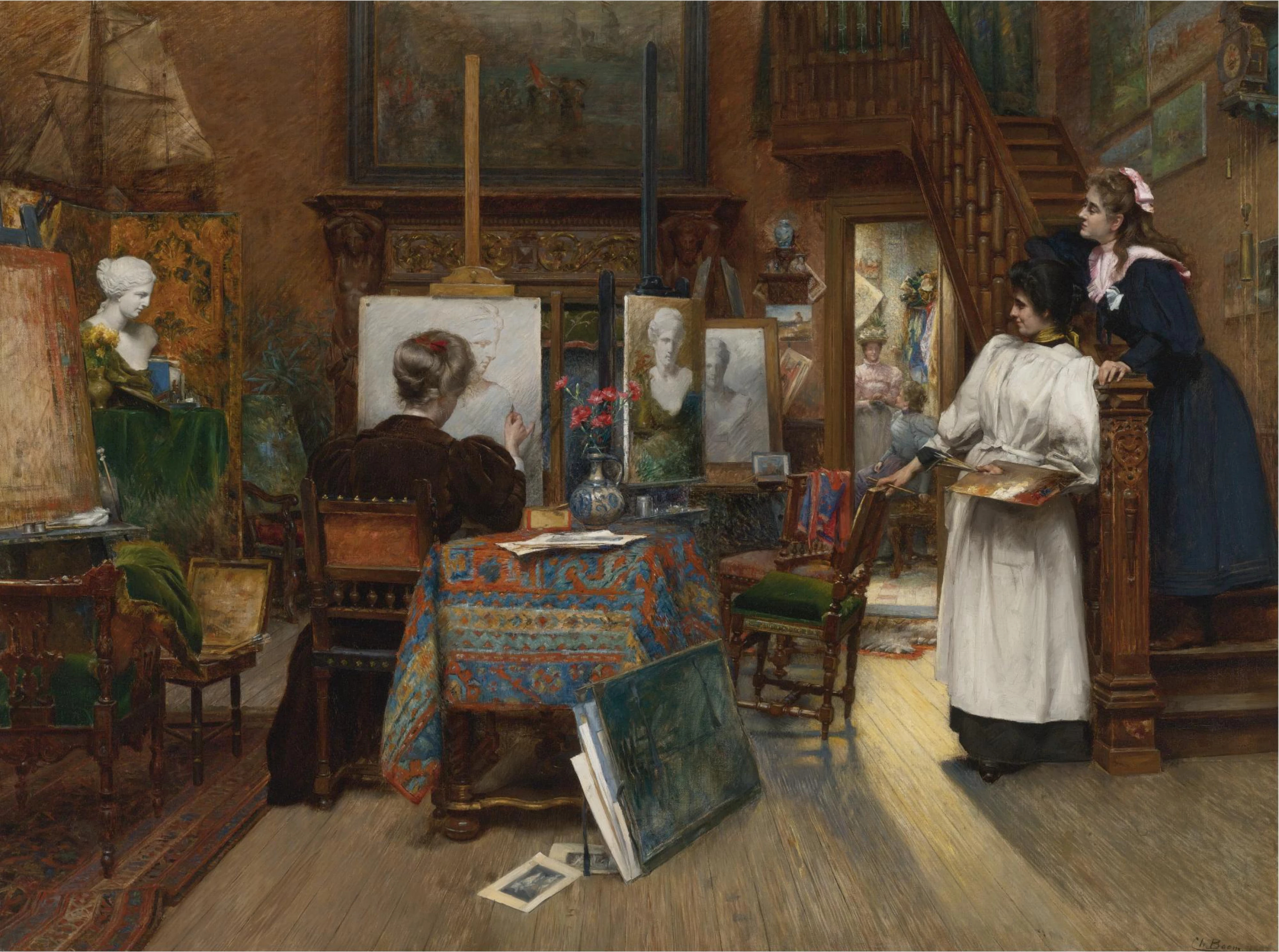
Female Artists

On 3 February 1883, he married Josephina (Maria Antonetta Ludovica) Verheyen. The couple had two daughters: Alice Anna Richard Boom (1884–1927) and Bertha Maria Antonetta Boom (1886–1966). He became in 1885 a teacher at the Antwerp Academy, a position he would hold until 1924. In 1932, he was appointed to the board of the Royal Museum of Fine Arts in Antwerp.

Boom also worked on the monumental decorative works in the City Halls of Antwerp (a collaboration with Piet Verhaert, Edgard Farasyn, Edouard de Jans and Henri Houben) and Hoogstraten. In the Castle of the Dukes of Brabant in Turnhout he created murals depicting scenes from the judicial history of Turnhout between 1928 and 1932 and a Neo-Flemish Baroque style painting of Christ on the cross (executed in 1926) on a wall with a monumental mantelpiece. He was awarded the Knight's Cross in the Order of Leopold.

On 13 February 1939 Karel Boom died at the age of 80.
