= Tesh =

Tesh may refer to:

- The symbol ʧ used for the voiceless postalveolar affricate in the International Phonetic Alphabet
- Tesh, Tjesh or Thesh, Predynastic ancient Egyptian king
- Tesh, Iran, a village in Gilan Province, Iran

== People with the surname ==
- Emily Tesh (fl. 2024), British science fiction and fantasy writer
- John Tesh (born 1952), American pianist, pop music composer, radio host and television presenter
- Shana Tesh (born 1987), Belgian TV personality
- Sylvia Noble Tesh (born 1937), American political scientist
