= Boum =

Boum may refer to one of the following:

- Boum, a type of dhow (Arab sailing vessel)

== People ==
- Boum (born 1985), French Canadian animator, illustrator, and comic strip author
- Hemley Boum (born 1973), Cameroonian writer
- Joseph Boum (born 1989), Cameroonian footballer
- Souley Boum (born 1999), American professional basketball player

== Film and television ==
- La Boum, a 1980 French language film.

== Music ==
- "Boum!", a popular song by the French singer/songwriter Charles Trenet
- "Boum Boum", song by Enigma from the 2003 album Voyageur
- "Boum Boum Boum" (Shana Tesh song), 2006 song by Shana Tesh
- "Boum Boum Boum", 2014 song and single by the British singer Mika

== See also ==
- Boom (disambiguation)
