= Boom (nickname) =

Boom is a nickname for:

- Ernest Carter (drummer)
- Daniel Boom Desjardins (born 1971), French-Canadian singer
- Dan Herron (born 1989), American National Football League player
- Anthony Boom Labrusca (born 1976), Filipino actor
- Johannes Boom Prinsloo (born 1989), South African rugby union footballer
- Hugh Trenchard, 1st Viscount Trenchard (1873-1956), marshal of the Royal Air Force
- Boom (comics), alias of two different characters from DC Comics

== See also ==
- Boom Boom (nickname)
- Boomer (nickname)
