= Blam =

Blam or BLAM may refer to:

== People ==
- Baz Luhrmann (born 1968), Australian film director, screenwriter and producer, who uses the producer credit BLAM
- Edmund Blampied (1886–1966), Jersey artist

== Music ==
- Blam! (album), a 1978 album by the Brothers Johnson
- Blam!, a 2010 album by Jme
- Barenaked Ladies Are Me, an album by the Barenaked Ladies

== Other uses ==
- Blam (Roy Lichtenstein), painting by Roy Lichtenstein
- Blam!, a series of TV shorts part of Disney's Have a Laugh!

== See also ==
- "Ka-Blam" (Harper's Island episode), 2009 episode of Harper's Island
- KaBlam!, Nickelodeon TV show
- "Kerblam!", Doctor Who TV episode
- Boom (disambiguation)
