= Boom Boom (nickname) =

Boom Boom or Boom-Boom is a nickname for:

- Shahid Afridi (born 1980), Pakistani cricketer
- Rey Bautista (born 1986), Filipino boxer
- Scott Beaumont (born 1978), English mountain bike racer
- Boom-Boom Beck (1904–1987), American Major League Baseball pitcher
- Boris Becker (born 1967), German tennis player
- Kevin Bieksa (born 1981), Canadian National Hockey League player
- Randy Blake (born 1986), American kickboxer
- Bill Brown (American football) (1938–2018) American football player
- Colt Cabana (born 1980), American professional wrestler
- Freddy Cannon (born 1940), American rock and roller
- Fred Couples (born 1959), American golfer
- Bernie Geoffrion (1931–2006), Canadian National Hockey League player
- Caitlyn Jenner (born 1949), American media personality and decathlete
- Tom Johnson (American boxer) (born 1964), American boxer and IBF featherweight champion (1993–1997)
- Sabine Lisicki (born 1989), German tennis player
- Ray Mancini (born 1961), American boxer
- John McCombe (born 1985), English footballer
- Alan Minter (born 1951), English boxer

== See also ==
- Boom (nickname)
- Boomer (nickname)
