= Buzz and Boomer =

Official mascots of the Winnipeg Blue Bombers

Buzz and Boomer are the official mascots of the Winnipeg Blue Bombers.

Two large blue-coloured birds, Buzz and Boomer made their debut in 1984 at Winnipeg Stadium. The two birds are now found at Princess Auto Stadium, the Winnipeg Blue Bombers new home stadium. During the off-season, they usually appear at various events on behalf of, or hosted by, the Blue Bombers organization.

- Buzz- Wears a Bombers helmet, flying goggles, and a blue jersey with number 01. He also has a long yellow beak. Buzz tends to be the more daring of the two mascots, performing the majority of the stunts of the duo.
- Boomer- Taller and leaner than Buzz, Boomer is more laid back than his counterpart. He spends more time cheering up the crowd than performing wild stunts. He wears a Bomber football helmet and a gold jersey with number 00. Boomer has a short, broad beak.

In 2012, a fan ran down the field and tackled Buzz during a game.

The Winnipeg Blue Bombers original mascot was Captain Blue. Since 1984 with the introduction of Buzz and Boomer, Captain Blue was made the secondary mascot.

Captain Blue is always seen driving his full scale Blue Bomber biplane, which is a lifelike cartoon replica of the WWI biplane flown under the British Royal Air Force.

After every touchdown and field goal scored by the Blue Bombers, Captain Blue drifts his biplane around the end zones. Since 2015 Captain Blue has also been the host to the tailgate parties at IG Field, opening the tailgate party when he arrives driving in his biplane.
