= The Suicide Bomber Game =

2002 video game

Kaboom: The Suicide Bombing Game
- A screenshot showing a score of kills and injuries
- Developer: fabulous999
- Publisher: Newgrounds
- Engine: Adobe Flash
- Platform: Browser
- Release: April 17, 2002
- Mode: Single-player

The Suicide Bomber Game (formerly known as Kaboom!, or Kaboom: The Suicide Bombing Game) is a Flash browser game that was released on 17 April 2002 on Newgrounds and developed by fabulous999. The game focuses on carrying out a suicide bombing for the purpose of killing civilians, and led to significant controversy.

== Gameplay ==
Players control a man, described as being of Arab appearance, moving either left or right through a "vaguely Middle Eastern-looking" street. Men, women and children walk back and forth along the street at various speeds. When the mouse is clicked, the man opens up his jacket, revealing an explosive belt, and detonates. The aim of the game is to kill and wound as many men, women and children as possible. The number of people both killed and injured is displayed, and a button appears allowing the player to play the game again.

== Background ==
The game's designer, known only by the username fabulous999, reportedly got the idea to create the game after reading an article in Time about suicide bombers, and created the game in one evening. By December 2002, the game had already been played over 875,000 times. The game was released as a demo, with the author stating in May 2002 that he planned to expand the game to include terrorist missions in twelve countries, however, the game was never expanded.

== Reception ==
The game's animation has been described as simple, and the game has been described as an "amateur" "no-budget" production. Fox News stated experienced video gamers would probably find the game's design "fairly unimpressive".

The game's content has been heavily criticised. The Jerusalem Post reported that reception of the game in Israel had been "not surprisingly negative." A radio station in Israel reportedly received a large number of angry phone calls after mentioning the game. A spokesman for Americans for Peace Now stated he was deeply troubled by the game. Psychologist David Walsh stated it was an example of particularly tasteless games that numb people to violence, though did not call for its removal, citing free speech. An Anti-Defamation League spokesperson stated: "It's disgusting and sick and it's offensive, and no matter what your politics are, there can be no kind of justification or rationalization for this kind of hate", and U.S. Representative Nita Lowey stated "Kaboom! trivializes the heinous act of killing and maiming innocent people." Lowey wrote a letter to Newgrounds asking them to remove the game from their site. Newgrounds refused, however, on the grounds of free speech, stating they would not take any material off their site unless it was illegal.

British politician Keith Vaz criticised the game in the House of Commons of the United Kingdom, calling for the game to be removed. Ed Vaizey, responding to Vaz's concern, pointed out that as the game was created by an individual outside of the mainstream gaming industry, it was not subject to UK gaming laws. A relative of a man killed in the 2002 Bali bombings also called for it to be removed.

The game was reported on by Saudi Arabian website Al Arabiya, and the neo-nazi website Resistance Records provided a link to the game.

In response to the criticism, the game's designer stated he did not intend to make any money off the game, and that the game's purpose was "to show that suicide bombers are nothing but expendable pawns whose sole purpose is to terrorize innocents." He also stated that "90 percent" of the emails he received regarding the game were positive, and that many of those emails were from Israel. A statement he made on Newgrounds read "I just think people who blow themselves up are stupid (...) If you found this offensive, tell your friends!" The designer stated the game was not set in Israel, however the demo's title screen featured an illustration of Yasser Arafat.

== See also ==
- Rendition (text adventure game)
