= KFOG KaBoom =

Outdoor concert in San Francisco, California (1994-2010)

KFOG KaBoom was an annual outdoor concert held by KFOG in San Francisco and which occurred in May from 1994 to 2010. It was followed by a fireworks show synchronized to a soundtrack broadcast by the station. The extravagant fireworks display drew over 350,000 people. In 2007, KaBoom began charging admission due to rising costs.

Through 1998, the event was known as the Sky Concert, but was renamed in 1999. Reportedly, this was due to the name being too generic and may conflict with Keilwerth S.K.Y. Concert Saxophones.

In 2010, the Port of San Francisco informed KFOG that Piers 30/32 in downtown San Francisco could no longer support the heavy equipment and vehicles necessary to produce large events. In May of that same year, KaBoom was moved from the pier location to the parking lot of Candlestick Park.

In the spring of 2011, KFOG announced that a proper venue for the show could not be found, and that KaBoom for 2011 was cancelled. No announcement has since been made for KaBoom since 2012. KFOG itself would sign off in September 2019, ending any chances of a reboot for the event.

Artist Lineup:

- 1994 (Sky Concert) - The Subdudes, NRBQ
- 1995 (Sky Concert) - Timbuk3, The Freddy Jones Band
- 1996 (Sky Concert) - The Odds, Robben Ford and The Blue Line
- 1997 (Sky Concert) - The Odds, Wilco, Keb' Mo'
- 1998 (Sky Concert) - Pete Droge, The Scott Thomas Ban, Roomful of Blues
- 1999 - Wes Cunningham, The Boneshakers, Wilco
- 2000 - Pat McGee Band, Shannon Curfman, Kenny Wayne Shepherd
- 2001 - Old 97's, Mother Hips, Blues Traveler
- 2002 - Zero 7, Robert Bradley's Blackwater Surprise, Boz Scaggs
- 2003 - Keller Williams, Nickel Creek, Susan Tedeschi, Steve Winwood
- 2004 - Train, The Waifs, Robert Randolph & the Family Band
- 2005 - John Butler Trio, Kathleen Edwards, Wallflowers
- 2006 - Jackie Greene, KT Tunstall, Los Lonely Boys
- 2007 - Ozomatli, Guster, Kenny Wayne Shepherd
- 2008 - Collective Soul, Los Lobos, Matt Nathanson
- 2009 - Chuck Prophet, Los Lonely Boys, Susan Tedeschi
- 2010 - Melissa Etheridge, John Butler Trio, Grace Potter and the Nocturnals
