= Herman van den Boom =

Belgian photographer (born 1950)

- Born: 1950 (age 75–76); Essen, Belgium
- Education: Design Academy Eindhoven, ArtEZ Institute of the Arts, Royal University College of Fine Arts
- Known for: Photography

Herman van den Boom (born 1950) is a Belgian photographer, artist, and designer.

Van den Boom received his education at the Eindhoven's Academy for Industrial Design (1968–1970), at the Academy for Fine Arts Enschede (now known as ArtEZ Institute of the Arts) (1970–1974), and at the Royal University College of Fine Arts in Stockholm (1970). He became a photography professor later in his career and taught at the AKI (1978–1980), the Royal Academy of Fine Arts (Antwerp) (HISK, 2002), and at the Academy for Fine Arts Maastricht (2003 and 2005), and lately at the Foto Factory, Amsterdam.

Travelling is a central element in his work and many of his photographs are taken on the road. Belgium, the United States, France, Spain, Germany, the United Kingdom, and Mexico, among others, appear in his pictures. Van den Boom works mainly with photographs, although he has also produced collages and sculptures. His photographs are both black and white and colour images with nature, cityscapes and human figures as a main subject. The resulting product evokes the poetry of the real world, in search of striking vantage points and light effects.

"Herman van den Boom's ability to notice details that he then plays against the broader backgrounds of society and culture turn his work into esthetical, intriguing studies in human landscape that should be approached as metaphors questioning the way we are and live as human beings."

In 2010 he won the Sony World Wide Photography Award for Landscape photography and in 2014 for Architecture photography. In 2010 he also received Honorable Mention by Curator Roxana Marcocci of the Museum of Modern Art New York for his work at the SantaFe Photofestival. In 2013 he received the Prix de la Decouverte of the Bibliothèque nationale in Paris. He had a solo exhibition in the Museum for Photography in Charleroi, and a presentation in BOZAR, Brussels.

There are several of his works in the permanent collection of museums and galleries, such as the Stedelijk Museum Amsterdam, the Hague's City Museum, the Prentenkabinet of the University of Leiden, the Antwerpen's Photography Museum, the International Center of Photography in New York, Museum of Contemporary Art Rio de Janeiro, museum for Photography Charleroi and the Lieu Art Contemporain in Sigean.
