= Boomer (surname) =

Boomer is the surname of:

- Aubrey Boomer (1897–1989), professional golfer
- Bill Boomer (1937–2022), former head coach of the men's swim team at the University of Rochester
- Edward J. Boomer (1821–?), member of the Wisconsin State Assembly
- Garth Boomer (1940–1993), an influential educationalist working in Australia
- George Boomer (1862–1915), American socialist journalist, newspaper editor, and political activist
- George B. Boomer (1832–1863), Union Army colonel in the American Civil War
- Harry Boomer (born 1953), newscaster for WOIO news in Cleveland, Ohio
- Jørgine Boomer (1887–1971), Norwegian-American businesswoman and entrepreneur
- Linwood Boomer (born 1955), Canadian television producer
- Percy Boomer (1885–1949), English golfer
- Walter E. Boomer (born 1938), retired former four-star general and Assistant Commandant of the United States Marine Corps and business executive
