= Shana Tesh =

Belgian television personality and singer

Shana Tesh born Milady in 1987 is a Belgian television personality and singer of Chilean and Spanish origin.

In 2003, she took part in the French television series À la Recherche de la Nouvelle Star based on the popular British show Pop Idol. She appeared in that contest under her real name Milady.

In 2004, she released a remake of the Spanish hit "Porque te vas" and in 2006, released "Boum Boum Boum", a song in Spanish language which was a chart success in France, in addition to appearing in Belgian French charts and in Switzerland. She followed it with an album of Latin sounds titled Musica.

== Discography ==
=== Albums ===
- 2006: Musica

=== Singles ===
Year	Album	Peak positions		
Year	Album	BEL (Wa)	FR	SWI
2004	"Porque te vas"	5 (Ultratip)	–	–
2006	"Boum Boum Boum"	12 (Ultratip)	8	51

*Did not appear in the official Belgian Ultratop 50 charts, but rather in the bubbling under Ultratip charts.
