= Henri Houben =

Belgian genre painter

- Born: Henri Houben ca. 1858; Belgium
- Died: ca. 1931; Antwerp, Belgium
- Education: Royal Academy of Fine Arts of Antwerp
- Occupation: Painter

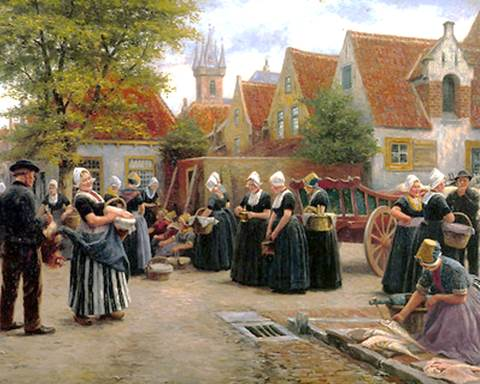
Fish Market (date unknown)

Henri Houben (1858–1931, born and died in Antwerp) was a Belgian genre painter.

== Life ==
He originally studied to be a violinist, but his interest in painting took the upper hand, so he enrolled at the Royal Academy of Fine Arts of Antwerp, where he studied under Charles Verlat. He later assisted Verlat with his panoramic paintings ("March of the Russian Army" and "The Battle of Waterloo") and executed decorative paintings from designs by Albrecht De Vriendt in the Antwerp City Hall. In 1885, he became a professor at the academy.

In Belgium, he worked primarily in Antwerp and the Kempen. He also travelled in Italy and Spain, but developed a particular fondness for the Netherlands, especially the maritime areas and Zeeland, working in Katwijk, Middelburg, Volendam, Veere, Vlissingen, Sluis and Yerseke. In Volendam he was a regular guest at the Hotel Spaander, a favorite spot for many painters, including Renoir.

His preferred subjects were the picturesque villagers who, at that time, still often dressed in native costume. He also produced five etchings for "Les Pittoresques", a book of sonnets by Georges Eekhoud.
