= Boomer (nickname) =

Boomer is the nickname of:

- Bobby Baun (1936–2023), Canadian National Hockey League player
- Chris Berman (born 1955), American sportscaster
- Ron Blomberg (born 1948), American former Major League Baseball player
- Bob "the Boomer" Brown (1941–2023), American football player
- Boomer Castleman, American singer-songwriter and guitarist
- Boomer Esiason (born 1961), American former National Football League quarterback
- Boomer Grigsby (born 1981), American football fullback
- Jerry Groom (1929–2008), American football player
- Wilfred "Boomer" Harding (1915–1991), Canadian multi-sport athlete
- Brent Harvey (born 1978), Australian rules footballer
- Charles Nicholl (1870–1939), Welsh rugby union player
- George Scott (first baseman) (1944–2013), American Major League Baseball player
- Vince Scott (1925–1992), Canadian football player
- John Dickson Stufflebeem (born 1952), retired US Navy vice admiral
- George Anthony Walkem (1834–1908), Canadian politician and jurist
- David Wells (born 1963), American former Major League Baseball pitcher
- Greg Wells (baseball) (born 1954), American former Major League Baseball player
