= Piet Verhaert =

Belgian etcher and painter (1852–1908)

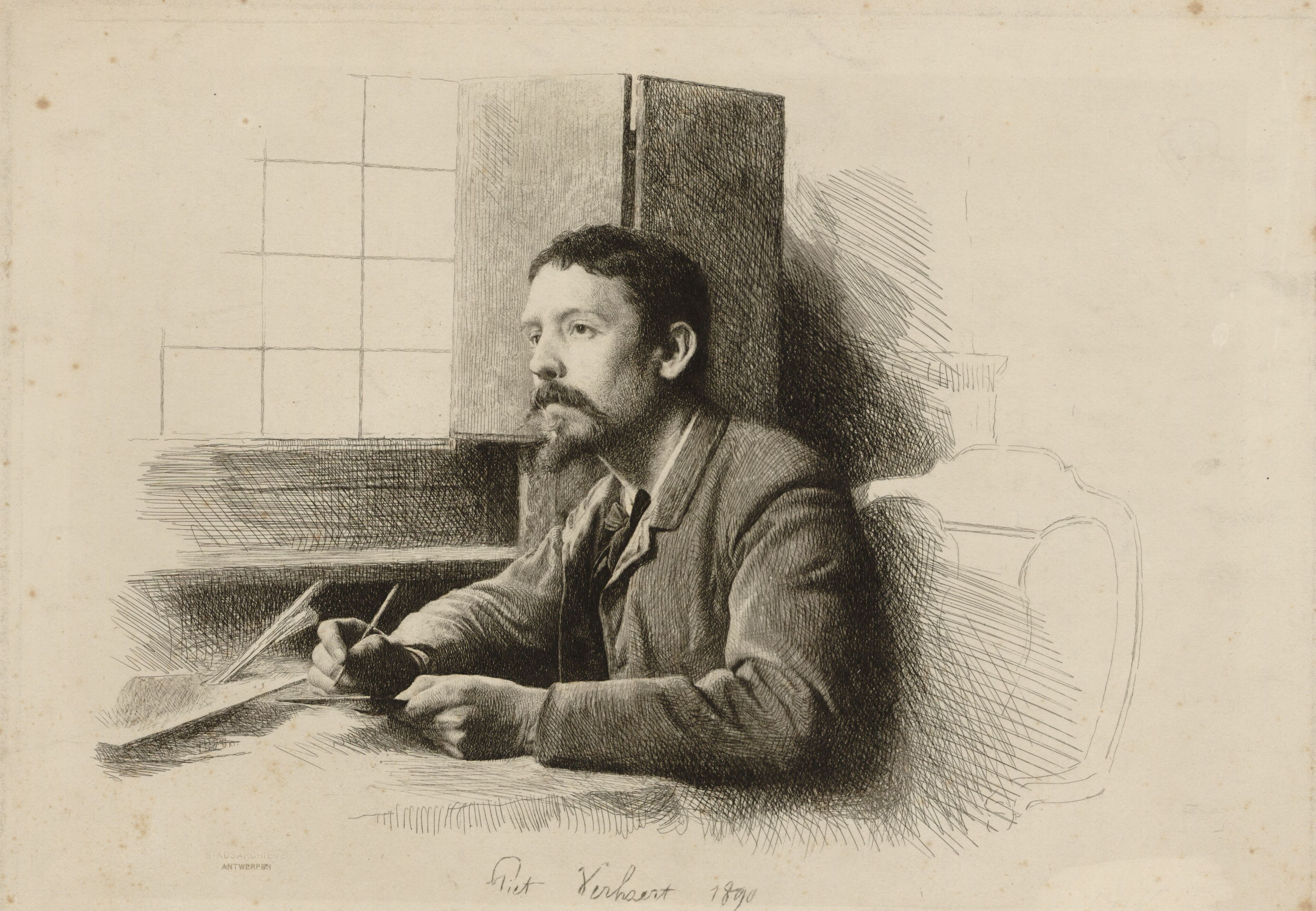
Self-Portrait of Piet Verhaert

Piet Verhaert (born Petrus Josephus Verhaert, 25 February 1852 – 4 August 1908), also known as Pieter Verhaert, was a Belgian painter and etcher painter of genre scenes, cityscapes, interiors, figures and portraits. He was also a designer of decorative panels. He was a member of various avant-garde artist associations such as Les XX and De XIII (Cercle des XIII), which were founded out of dissatisfaction with the conservative selection policies of the official academic salons. He was a teacher at the Academy of Antwerp.

== Life and career ==
Verhaert trained at the Academy of Antwerp, where he first studied sculpting but then switched to painting. One of his teachers there was Jozef Van Lerius (1823-1876), a painter in the Belgian Romantic-Historical style. He was part of a group of young artists known as the "Van Beers Clique", led by Jan van Beers. This group included the artists Alexander Struys and Jef Lambeaux. They were well known for their mischievous and eccentric behaviour, such as walking around Antwerp dressed in historic costumes.

The Palingbrugstraat in Antwerp

He travelled to The Netherlands, Italy and later Spain. He debuted in 1873 at the Triannual Salon van Antwerpen. He stayed in Paris during the year 1876. During his time in Spain (1882–83), he made copies after works by Velázquez.

He was among a large number of Antwerp artists who established the Association of Antwerp Etchers (Dutch: Vereeniging der Antwerpsche etsers, French: l'Association des aquafortistes anversois) in 1880. The Vereeniging published an annual album containing graphic works of its members.

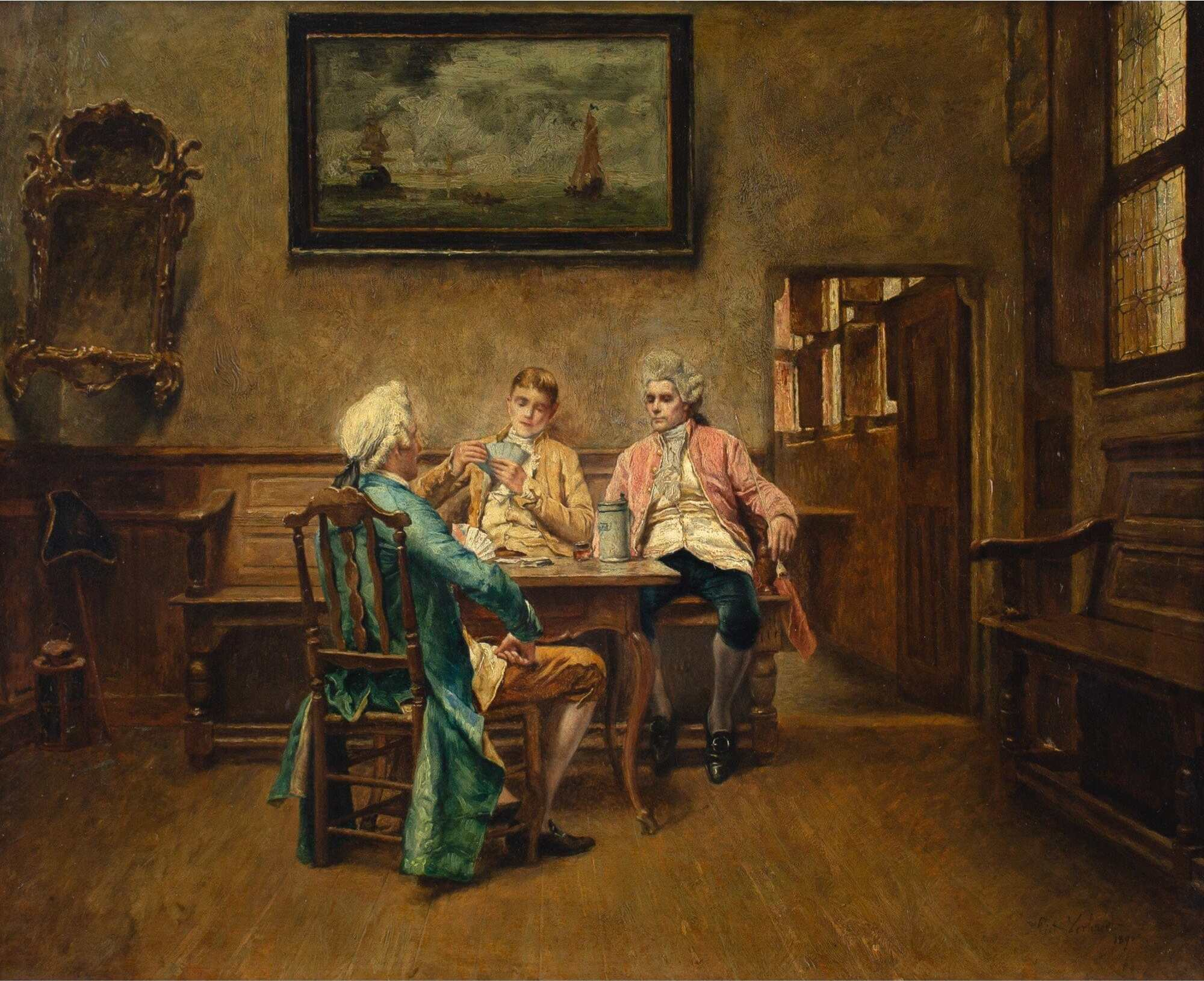
The Card Players

He was a member of Les XX ("The Twenty"), an association founded on 28 October 1883 in Brussels by artists who opposed the conservative selection policies of the official academic Salons. It introduced through its exhibitions works of foreign artists such as Paul Signac, Auguste Rodin, Camille Pissarro, Walter Sickert, James McNeill Whistler and Paul Cézanne.

He was one of the co-founders of De XIII (Cercle des XIII) established in Antwerp in February 1891 with objectives similar to those of Les XX of Brussels. It existed until 1899 and, during its existence, held only three salons.

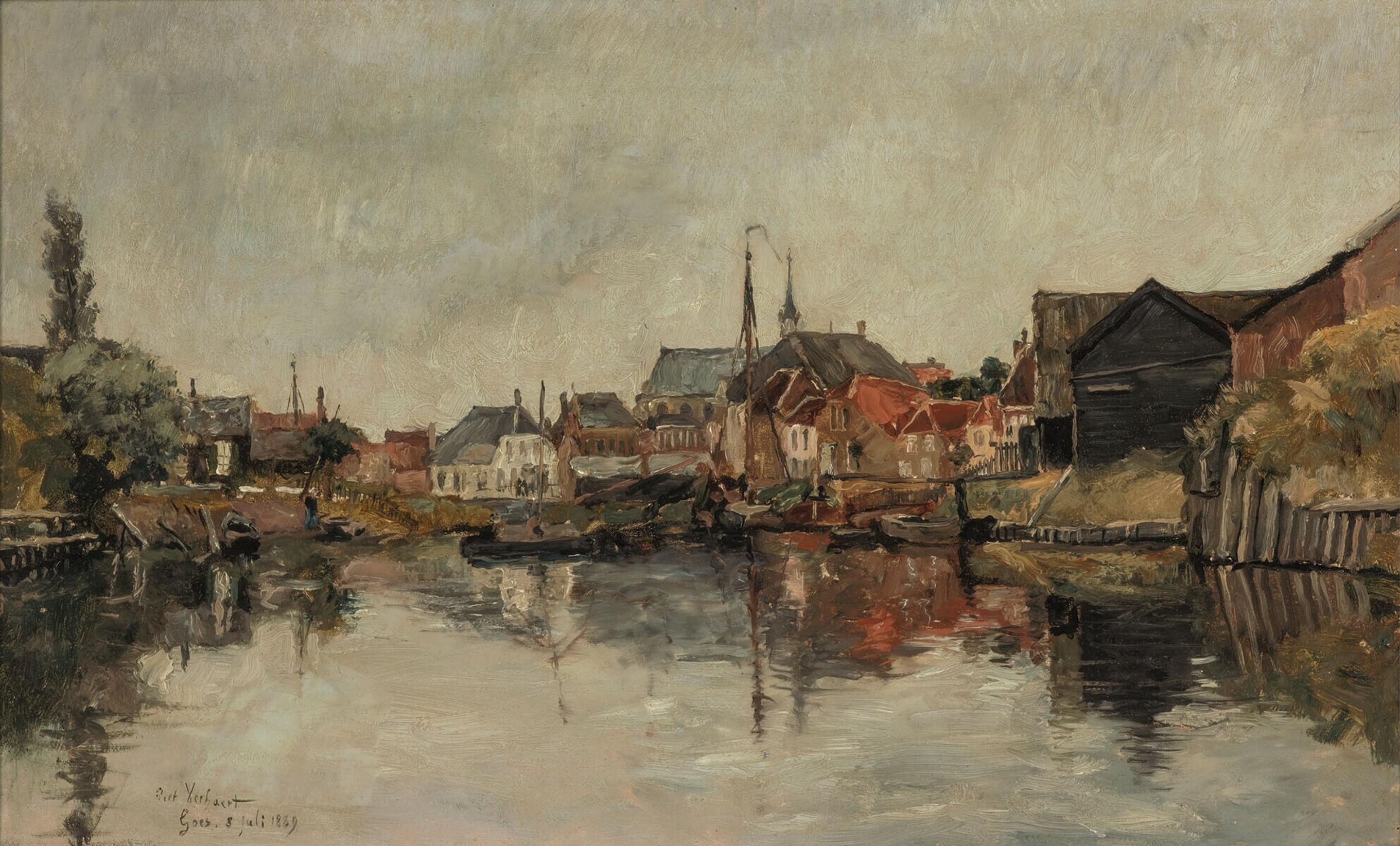
The port of Goes

He was a teacher at the Academy of Antwerp from 1886. When Pieter Van Havermaet died on 8 May 1897, Verhaert succeeded him as a teacher at the Antwerp Academy in the subjects of 'Drawing of the figure after life and after antiques' and 'Shadowed drawing after plaster, bust, etc'. From 1892 to 1908 he was a member of the provincial council of Antwerp as a representative of the Liberal Party.

Verhaert died on 4 August 1908 in Oostduinkerke in tragic circumstances after a heated argument with a neighbour over a boundary marker. He suffered a congestion which caused his death.

== Work ==
He was a painter and etcher of townscapes, interiors, figures and portraits. He was also a notable painter of decorative panels. He painted initially predominantly genre scenes of the 17th and 18th centuries in a precise style and palette reminiscent of the Antwerp painter Henri de Braekeleer. From the beginning of the 1880s he started to work in plein-air and to add more colour to his palette. He also starts depicting contemporary rather than historical scenes, and the occasional nude. At the time, he was best known for his views of the old streets of Antwerp.

View of Antwerp

After 1890, he began to concentrate on landscapes and seascapes. He left the comfort of Antwerp and began to paint landscapes outside Antwerp, in Zeeland or on the North Sea coast of West Flanders. His colors became lighter and brighter. He painted a fresco in the stairwell of Antwerp City Hall in 1899 with a historical theme. This was part of a decoration project under the direction of Albrecht de Vriendt for which four other artists also painted a fresco.

As a graphic artist, Verhaert produced series of etchings under the titles Croquis et Impressions de la vieille Ville d'Anvers (Sketches and Impressions of the Old City of Antwerp) and Le Centenaire de la Réouverture de l'Escaut (The Centenary of the Reopening of the Scheldt). These two albums contain reproductions of drawings done in sepia, chalk or coal and mostly after nature. As an etcher, Verhaert worked directly with the needle on the sensitive plate.
