= Linnig =

Linnig is a surname. Notable people with the surname include:

- Egide Linnig (1821-1860), Belgian painter, draughtsman, and engraver
- Jozef Linnig (1815-1891), Belgian painter, watercolorist, engraver, art historian, and art dealer
- Willem Linnig the Elder (1819-1885), Belgian painter and engraver
- Willem Linnig the Younger (1842-1890), Belgian painter and engraver
