= Bal & co =

Former jenever distillery in Merksem

Distillerie Bal & Co was a jenever distillery in Merksem in Antwerp, Belgium, founded in 1861.

== History ==
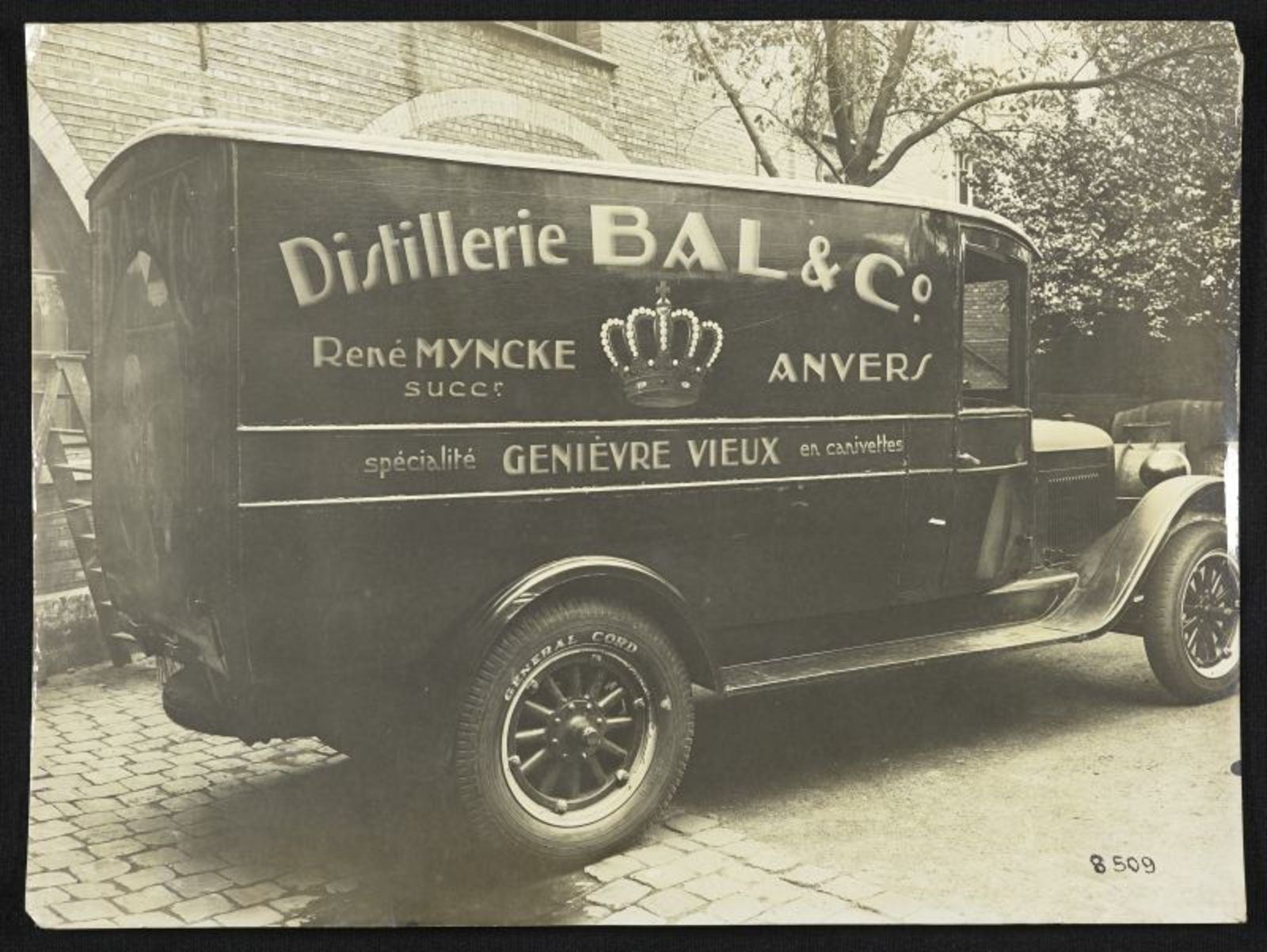
Black and white photo of a company van from Distillerie Bal & Co

After an early career as clerks at the Van den Bergh Distillery, Jan Baptist and Corneel Jozef Bal opened their own jenever distillery under the name La Couronne - De Kroon Distillery.

When Jan Baptist Bal died in 1866, his brother Corneel Jozef and his 4 sons continued the company under the name Distillerie C.J. Bal & Cie. In 1894 the company's name was changed to Usines Bal & Cie.

The Neoclassical offices (1888) of De Kroon Steam Distillery, a.k.a. Distillerie à vapeur 'La Couronne', were located in Korte Winkelstraat in Antwerp. They were designed by Antwerp architect Joseph Hertogs (1861-1931).

The company expanded its activities to include a yeast factory, on the corner of Cassiersstraat and Van de Wervestraat in Antwerp, and the production of butter and margarine in Merksem.

In 1959 the company was taken over by Frans Hol.

== International exhibitions ==
The distillery took part in several international exhibitions:

- Antwerp, 1885
- Antwerp, 1894
- Ghent, 1913

== Products ==
Known registered labels of the company:

- Bal's Oude Klare, registered on 11 May 1906
- Hollandia Bitter (eau-de-vie d'amer), registered on 28 May 1907
- Zuivere Oude Graan Genever van 't kruikje, registered on 8 November 1923
- Graanjenever van 't kruikje, Bal & Co, registered on 8 November 1923
