= Willem Linnig =

Willem Linnig may refer to:

- Willem Linnig the Elder (1819–1885), Belgian painter and engraver
- Willem Linnig the Younger (1842–1890), Belgian painter and engraver
