= Henry Luyten =

Belgian painter

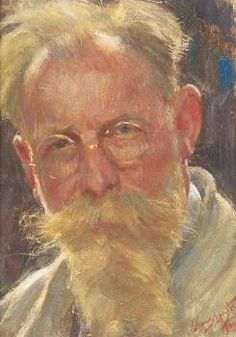
- Selfportrait
- Born: 21 May 1859; Roermond, the Netherlands
- Died: 21 January 1945 (aged 85); Brasschaat, Belgium
- Education: Royal Academy of Fine Arts
- Known for: Painting
- Spouse: Joanna Francisca Brees

Henry Luyten or Jan Hendrik Luyten (21 May 1859 in Roermond – 21 January 1945 in Brasschaat) was a Dutch-born Belgian painter. He is known for his genre scenes, marines, landscapes, portraits and animal scenes.

== Biography ==
Hendrik Luyten was born in Roermond, Netherlands as the son of Francis Hubert Luyten (1833–1908) and Johanna Hendrica de Bee (1829–1904). He studied at the Royal Academy of Fine Arts in Antwerp, Belgium from 1878. In 1883 he attended classes at the Ecole des Beaux-Arts in Paris with Alexander Cabanet. After 10 months he returned to Antwerp. In 1884 Luyten became a member of the art circle Als ik kan ('As I can') and participated in a number of expositions. His main friends in the art circle were Henri van de Velde, Jan-Willem Rosier and Leon Brunin. From 1886 (Gold Medal from the Rijksmuseum in Amsterdam) he became friends with Dutch artists Matthijs Maris, Jacob Maris, Hendrik-Willem Mesdag, Alma Tadema and the Italian painter Giovanni Segantini.

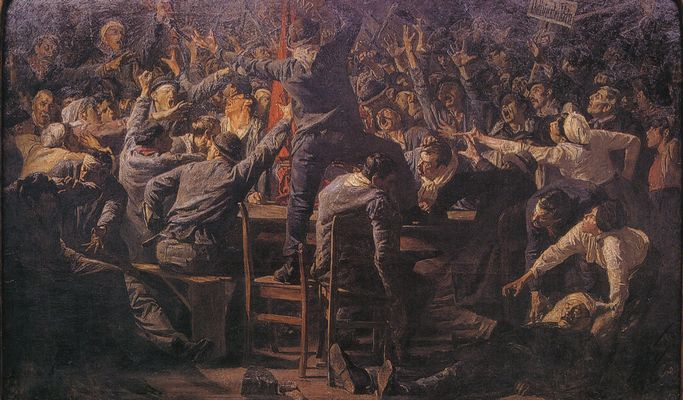
The strike

In the period from 1886 to 1887 Luyten resided in the Borinage, a coalmining area in the south of Belgium where the working and living conditions of the miners were appalling. Here he witnessed the great strike and its bloody suppression. In response, he painted the triptych "The Strike" on which he worked until 1893. The painting (international title: "Struggle for Life") measures 3 by 5 metres (120 by 200 in). The painting on the right-hand panel (3 by 2.5 metres (118 by 98 in)) is called "After the uprising" and the left-hand panel is called "Misery".

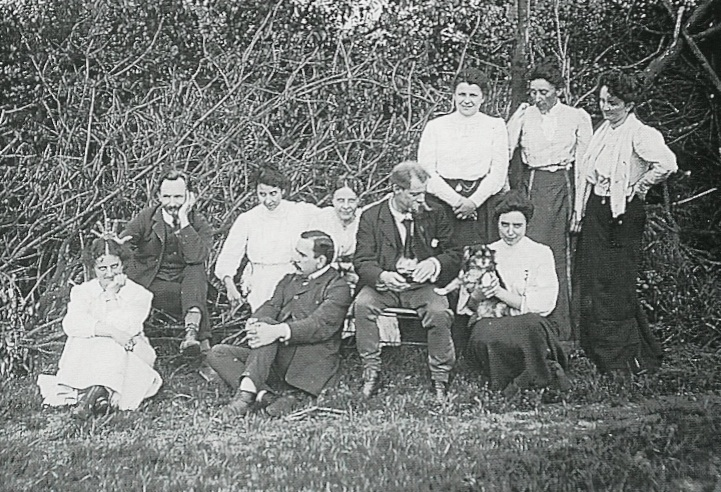
Henry Luyten (seated, center); Charles Lesaar (second from left)

On 17 April 1890 Luyten married Joanna Francisca Brees (1854–1916). A son named Henry Francis was born on 28 November 1892 from this marriage. The family settled for some time in Merksem. In 1896 Luyten became a naturalized Belgian. He then established himself as an artist in Brasschaat, near Antwerp. In his house, an old farmhouse surrounded by a large garden, he opened a private school of painting around 1900, the Institut des Beaux Arts Henry Luyten. Here he taught pupils from across Europe and the United States and let them paint from nature. His international students included Mara Corradini (Italy/Switzerland), Flora Zenker (Germany), Mary Poulle (USA), Pierre Blanc (Luxembourg), Maria Jansen (Netherlands), Mathilde Bernard (Belgium), Charles Myr Lesaar (Belgium), and Hedwich Behnisch (Breslau). Hedwich Behnisch would become his second wife in 1917 after the death of his first wife Joanna. Behnisch was born in 1873 in Luszkowa (Hohenangern) in the former German province of Posen. Her family owned large estates and castles in Silesia, but lost everything after World War II.

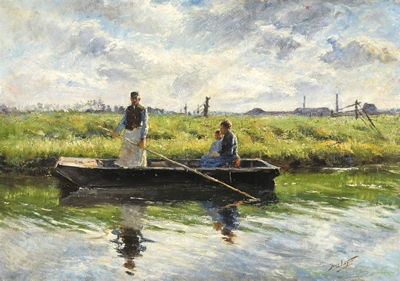
Ferry

Luyten was blamed after World War I for his support for the Dutchification of Ghent University by the occupying Germans and his acceptance of a position at the Antwerp Academy during the war. He was boycotted by the establishment, had to give up his post at the Academy and had difficulty finding buyers for his work.

Embittered, he and his wife left Belgium for a number of years and the couple settled in northern Germany in Wieck am Darss on the Baltic Sea. In 1923 he returned to Brasschaat as a convinced flamingant.

At the end of 1923 Luyten stayed several weeks in Rüschlikon on Lake Zurich in Switzerland. From that period date studies of the snowy Alps and artistic portraits of friends and family. He had shows in London in 1926 and in Manchester in 1928. Greatly disappointed with the Belgian boycott, Hendrik Luyten offered to donate his work to his birth city Roermond in 1930. Cuypers' son Jos offered a wing of the former home of his father to build a museum. This led to the foundation of the "Municipal Museum Hendrik Luyten-Dr. Cuypers' inaugurated by the then Princess Juliana in 1932. Luyten was also appointed an Officer of the Order of Orange Nassau. On 19 January 1933, his daughter Lieselotte was born. A year later his son Henry died.

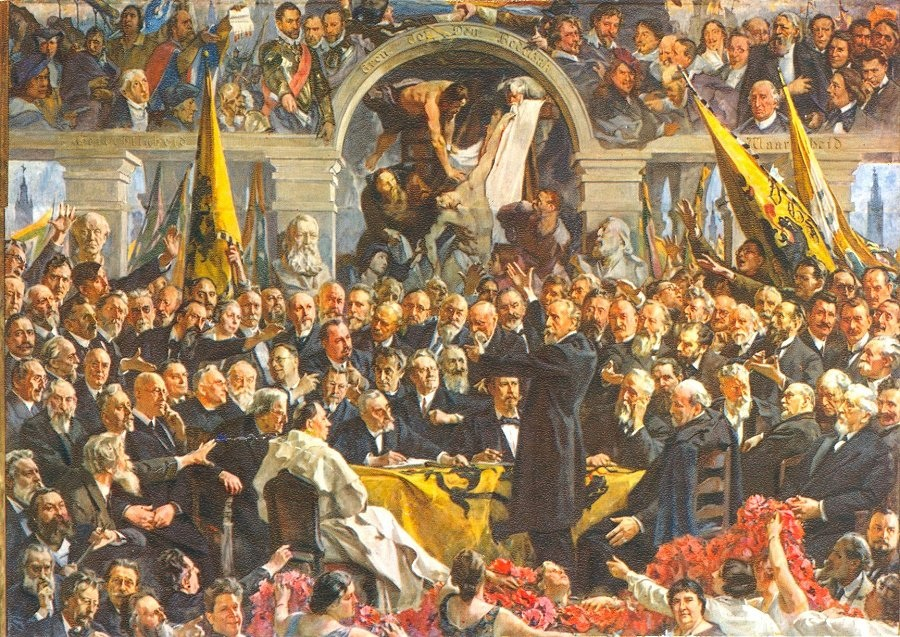
The Golden Canvass of Flanders

Luyten had to pay for his perceived stance during the World War I twenty years later. At the start of World War II, the octogenarian was jailed for one night. During the post-war repression following the liberation of parts of Belgium he was lifted from his sickbed in January 1945 and again jailed for one night. He died a few days later.

== Works ==
As a painter, Luyten was very versatile. Best known as an impressionist landscape painter, he also excelled in portraits and genre scenes. He was influenced by the 19th century Hague School and Barbizon school as well 17th century Dutch and Flemish painting.

One of his most famous works is The Golden Canvass of Flanders ('Het Gulden Doek van Vlaanderen') in which Luyten depicts a fictional meeting of the one hundred odd people who in his opinion played a key role in Flemish history and the Flemish movement. Catholic or liberal, activist or anti-German, alive or already deceased, he portrayed all against the backdrop of Rubens' Descent from the Cross. He worked on the painting for more than 10 years. It was donated to the IJzertoren (Yser Tower) where it is kept in the museum.
