= Frans Van Kuyck =

Belgian painter and graphic artist

Frans van Kuyck
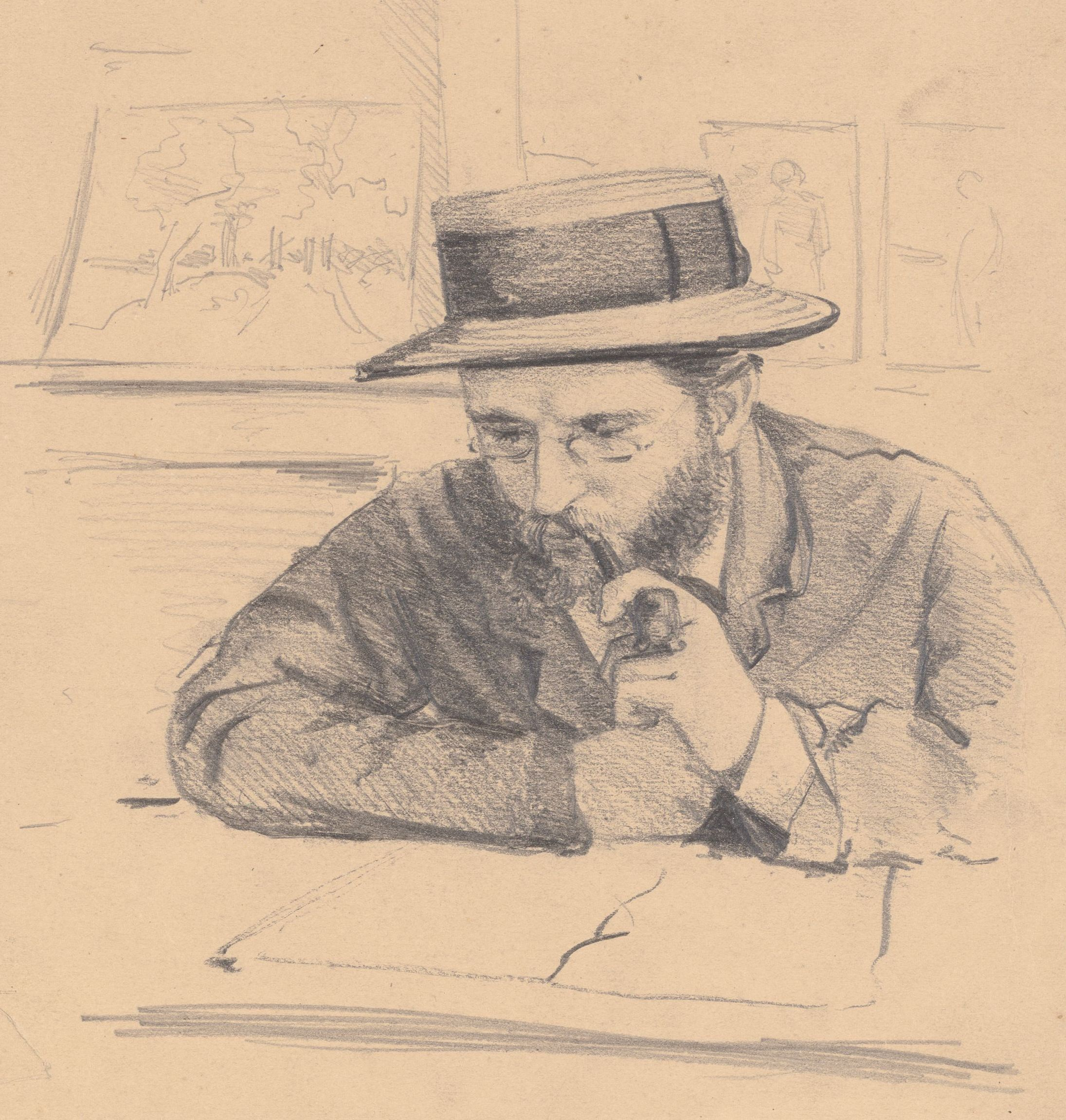
- Drawing of Frans Van Kuyck by Leon Brunin
- Born: Frans Pieter Lodewijk van Kuyck; 9 June 1852; Antwerp, Belgium
- Died: 31 May 1915 (aged 62); Antwerp, Belgium
- Education: Royal Academy of Fine Arts
- Occupation: Painter
- Relatives: Louis Van Kuyck (father); Walter Van Kuyck (son)

Frans Pieter Lodewijk van Kuyck (9 June 1852, Antwerp – 31 May 1915, Antwerp) was a Belgian painter and graphic artist. He is also known for helping to establish Mother's Day in Belgium.

== Life and career ==
He came from a family of artists. His father was the painter, Louis Van Kuyck. His grandfather was also a painter, and his son was the architect, Walter Van Kuyck (1876–1934). He studied at the Royal Academy of Fine Arts and his first well-known work was the official poster for the Exposition Universelle d'Anvers (1885).

Later, as a teacher at the academy, he became involved in the cultural and political life of Antwerp. In 1888, he became a provincieraadslid (county councilor) and, from 1891, served as an Alderman of Fine Arts on the Antwerp City Council. He also sat on the boards of several museums, including what is now the Plantin-Moretus Museum, and was chairman of the "Koninklijk Kunstverbond Antwerpen" (Cercle Royal Artistique).

During his time in office, the Vlaamse Opera Company was officially established and monuments were erected for Peter Benoit, Hendrik Conscience and Jan Van Rijswijck. On his initiative, the city acquired Schoonselhof cemetery and created the Nachtegalen Park. He was also the driving force behind the purchase and restoration of the "Vleeshuis" (a Medieval Guild Hall). In addition, he oversaw the beautification and expansion of the Leysstraat in 1898.

In the summer of 1913, he wrote a pamphlet, De Dag der moeders (Mother's Day) and formed the first committee to promote its establishment as an official holiday.

== Illustrations and writings ==
- Georges Eekhoud, Kermesses. Illustré de dix compositions de Frans Van Kuyck, H. Kistemaeckers (1884)
- Rosalie and Virginie Loveling, Gedichten (stories, with illustrations by Van Kuyck), Ghent (1889)
- Max Rooses, Oud-Antwerpen, Watercolor paintings and drawings by F. Van Kuyck. Exhibition catalog, La Librairie Neerlandaise (1903).
- Frans Van Kuyck and F. Jos Van den Branden, Hendrik Conscience 1812-1912, J.-E. Buschmann (1912)

== Selected works ==
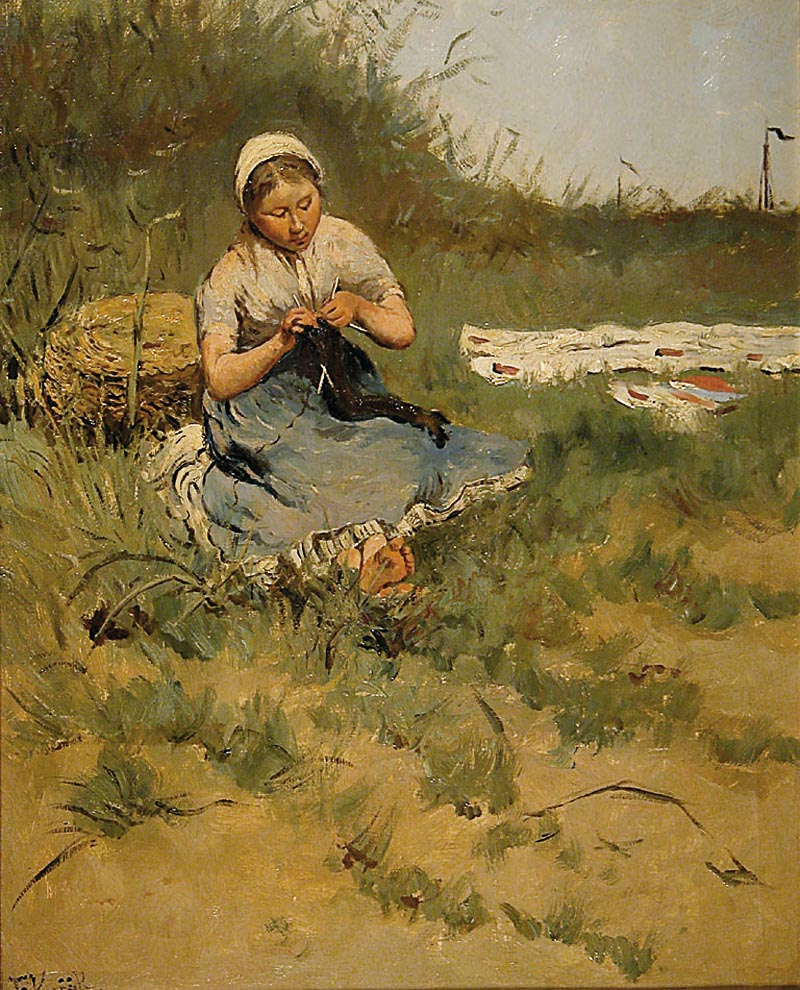
Kintting Girl

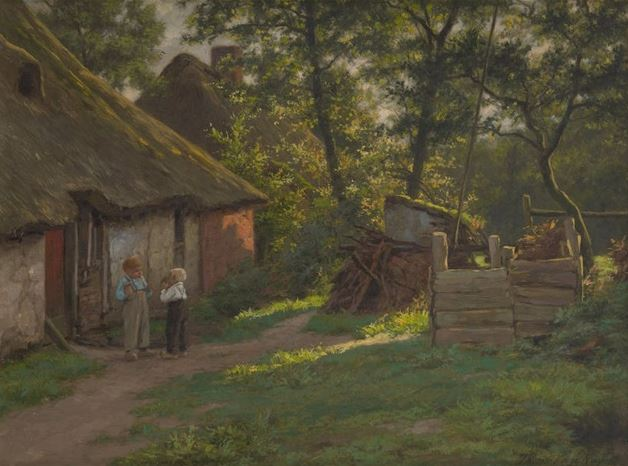
Children in Front of the Cottage

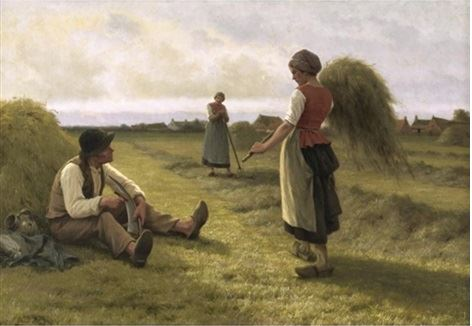
The Harvest

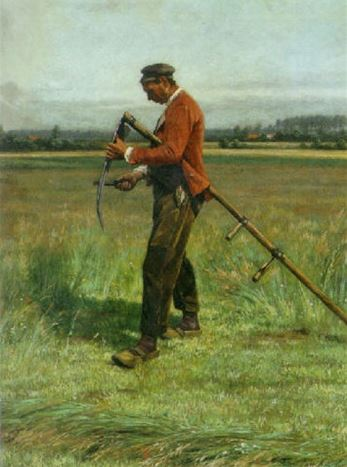
Sharpening the Scythe
