= Walter MacEwen =

American painter

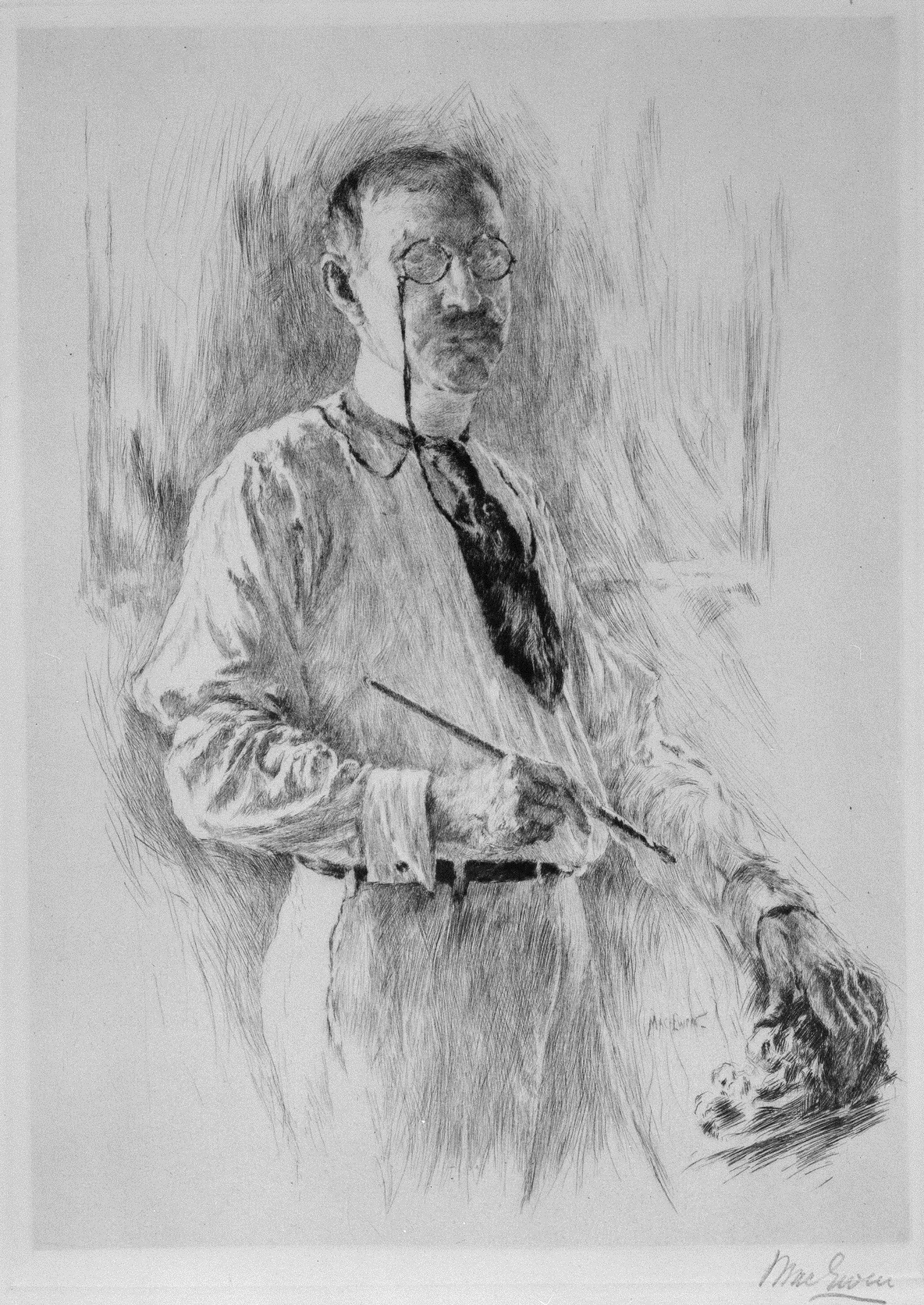
Self-portrait

Walter MacEwen (13 February 1860 - 20 March 1943) was an American painter. From 1884 to 1914, he often lived and worked in the Netherlands. He is considered to have been a member of the Egmondse School, named after the mostly American artists' colony near Egmond aan Zee.

== Biography ==
MacEven was born and raised in Chicago. He was the son of a merchant and entrepreneur of Scottish origin. He began by studying business, but decided that he would rather be a painter. In pursuit of that goal, he went to Europe in 1877 and enrolled at the Academy of Fine Arts, Munich. In 1881, he continued his studies in Paris at the Académie Julian. There, he met George Hitchcock and Gari Melchers, who would become his lifelong friend. Both had already made plans to work in the Netherlands.

He followed them there in 1884 and settled in Egmond aan Zee, where he would live for three years and many times thereafter, until the beginning of World War I, although he still visited Paris during the war. At various times, he also worked in Hattem, where he briefly had his own studio, Volendam and Haarlem. He focused on simple, rural themes and was very fond of the works of Jan Vermeer, although he also displays some influence from the Hague School.

During his life, he was internationally known. He held several exhibitions at the Paris Salon and was awarded a medal at the Exposition Internationale at Antwerp in 1894. He also had showings at the World's Columbian Exposition in his hometown of Chicago and at the Exposition Universelle (1900).

After World War I, he settled in Paris. While there, he continued to paint the same general type of subject matter, but also took commissions for portraits. In 1940, the outbreak of World War II forced him to leave again. He returned to the United States and took up residence in New York, where he died three years later.

In the United States, his works may be seen at the Virginia Museum of Fine Art, Dallas Museum of Art, Art Institute of Chicago, the Telfair Museum of Art in Savannah and at the National Academy of Design in New York.

== Selected paintings ==
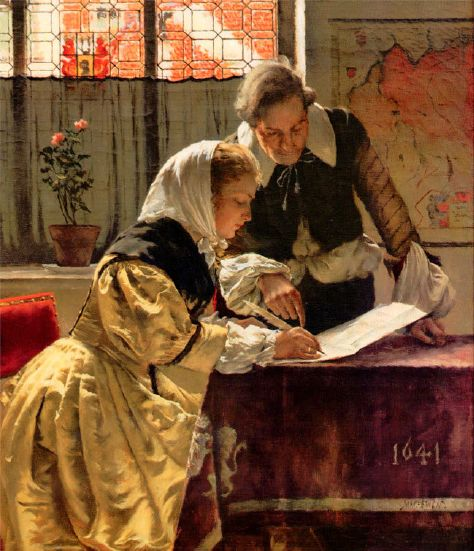
The Notary

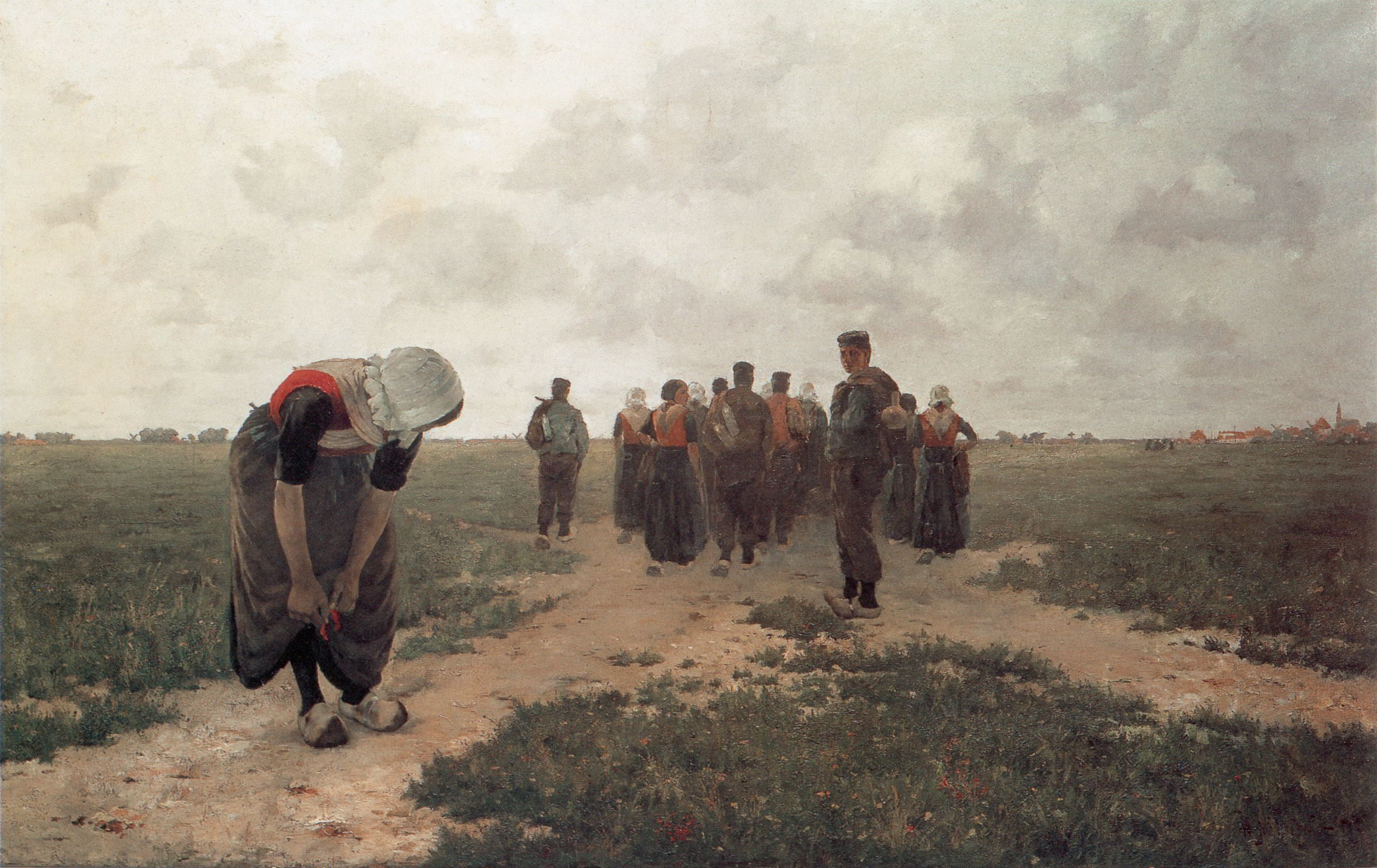
Returning from Work

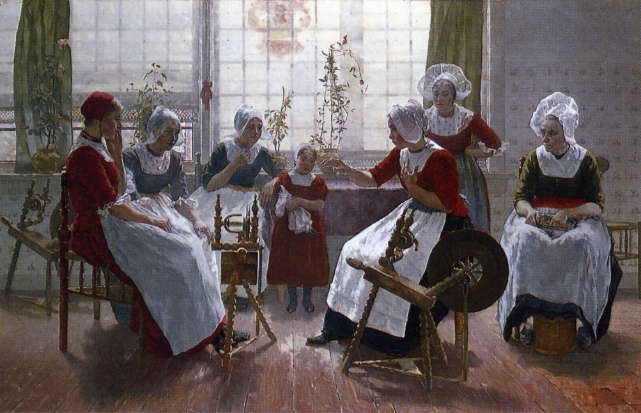
Telling a Ghost Story

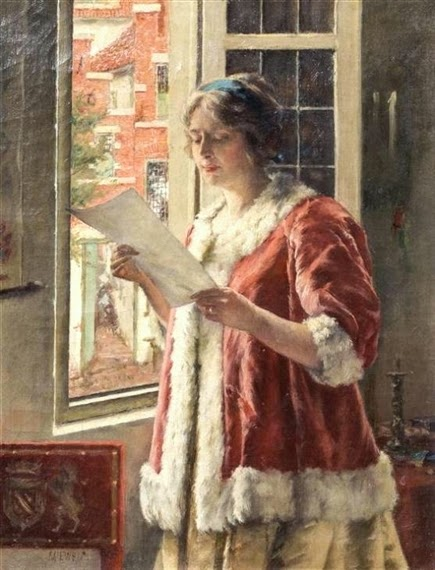
The Letter
(inspired by Vermeer)

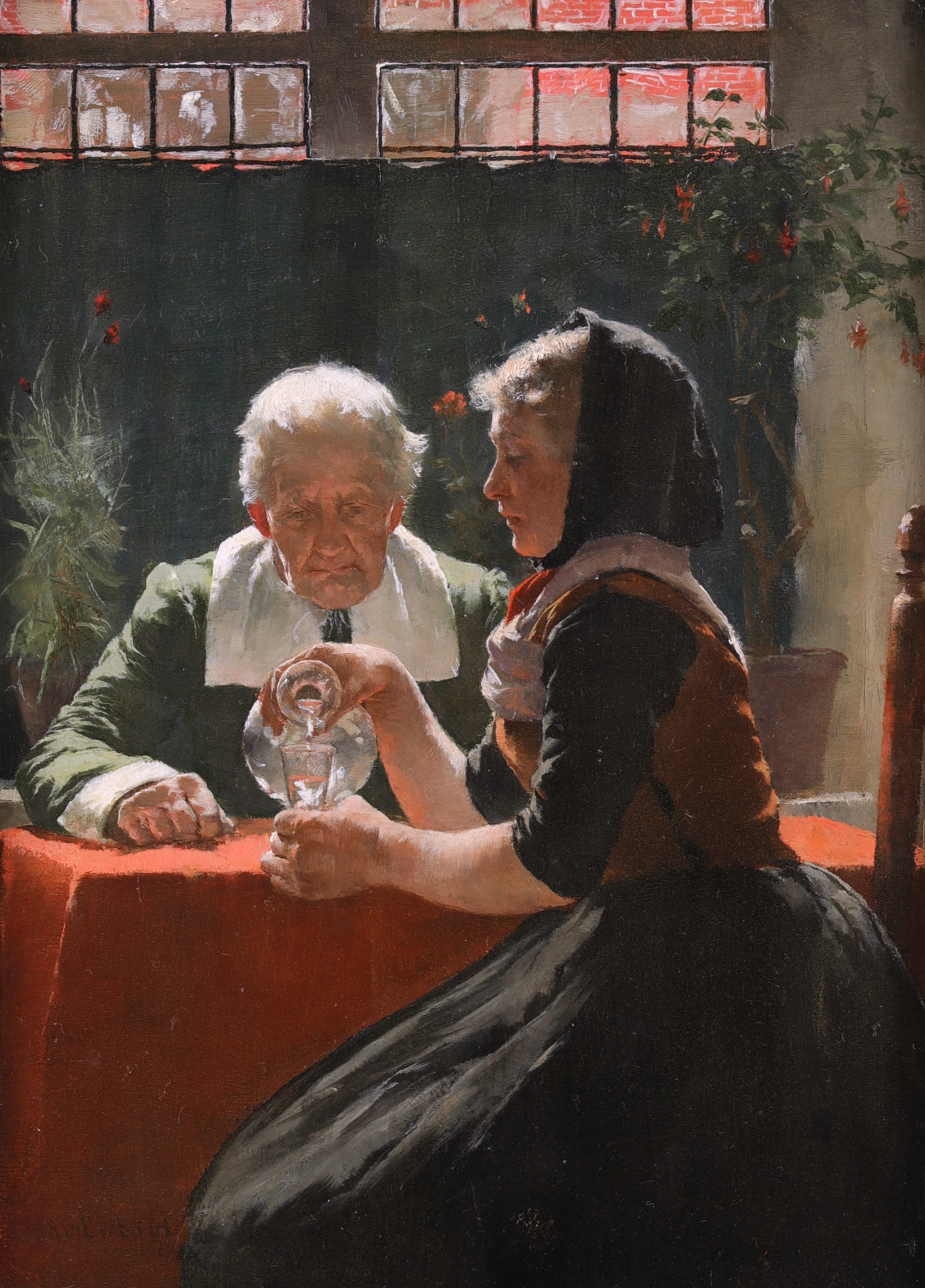
The Scribe's Office
