= Antwerp International Exposition (1894) =

World's fair held in Antwerp, Belgium

1894 Antwerp
- Poster for the exhibition

Overview
- BIE-class: Unrecognized exposition
- Area: 65.5 acres (265,000 m^{2})
- Visitors: 3,000,000
- Organized by: Count Hippolyte d'Ursel was Commissioner General and Count de Pret Roose de Calesburg was President of the Executive Committee

Participant(s)
- Countries: 23

Location
- Country: Belgium
- City: Antwerp
- Coordinates: 51.207389°N 4.390222°E

Timeline
- Opening: 5 May 1894
- Closure: 5 November 1894

The Antwerp International Exposition (Dutch: Wereldtentoonstelling van Antwerpen; French: Exposition internationale d'Anvers) of 1894 was a world's fair held in Antwerp, Belgium, between 5 May and 5 November 1894. It covered 65.5 acres (265,000 m^{2}), attracted 3 million visits and made a profit. It took place at the same location as the 1885 exposition.

== Participating nations ==
There were several participating nations: German Empire, Austro-Hungarian Empire, Bulgaria, China, Congo, Denmark, Spain, United States, United Kingdom, Greece, Hungary, Italy, Luxembourg, Mexico, Persia, Portugal, Romania, Russia, the South African Republic (for which Gerard Jacob Theodoor Beelaerts van Blokland was Commissaire Général), Switzerland and the Ottoman Empire.

There was also a joint presence from Sweden and Norway.

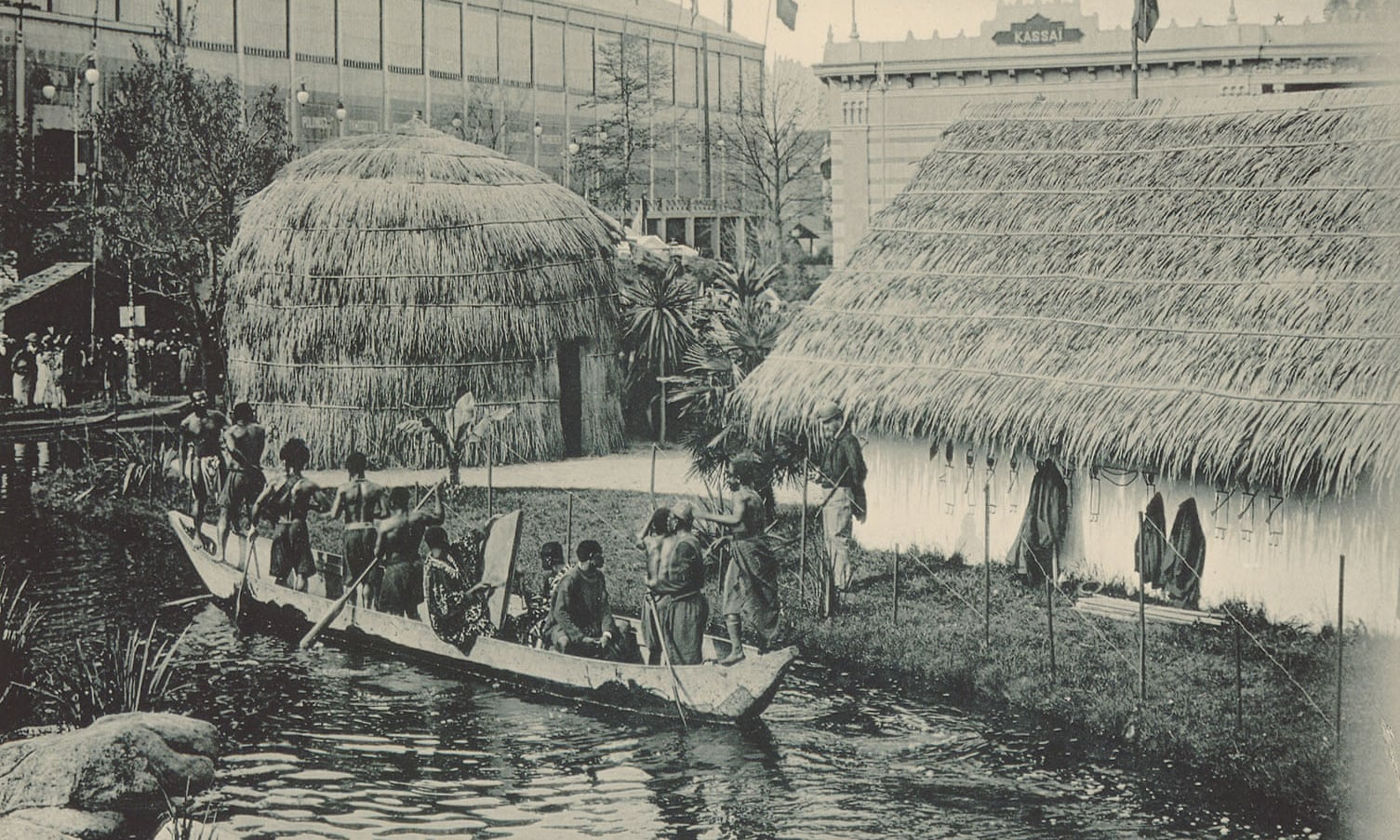
The 'Congolese Village' human zoo during the exhibition

As well as Netherlands itself, there were presentations of the Dutch East Indies including Java, parts of Sumatra and Madura.

== Fair officials ==
Count Hippolyte d'Ursel was the Commissioner General and Count de Pret Roose de Calesburg the President of the Executive Committee.

== Prize ==
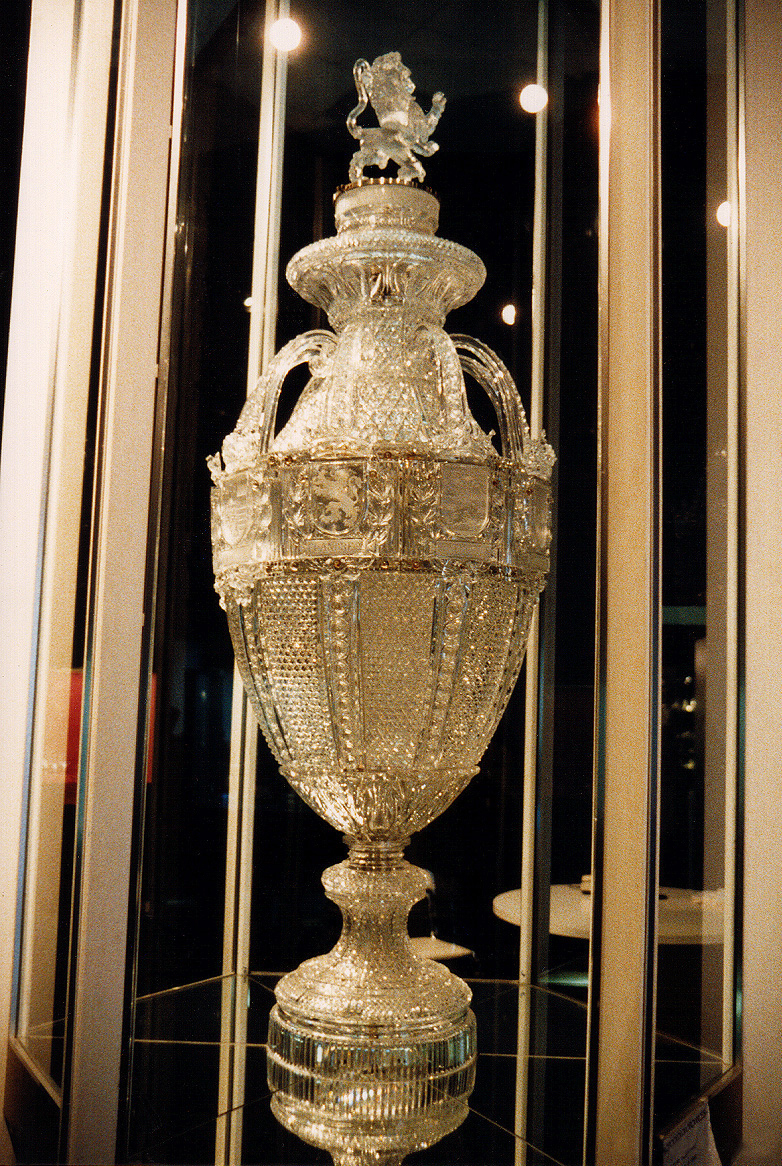
Monumental vase created for the exposition

Walter MacEwen won a medal of honour (grand prize).

== See also ==
- Antwerp International Exposition (1885)
- Concert Tunisien
