= Louis Van Kuyck =

Belgian genre painter

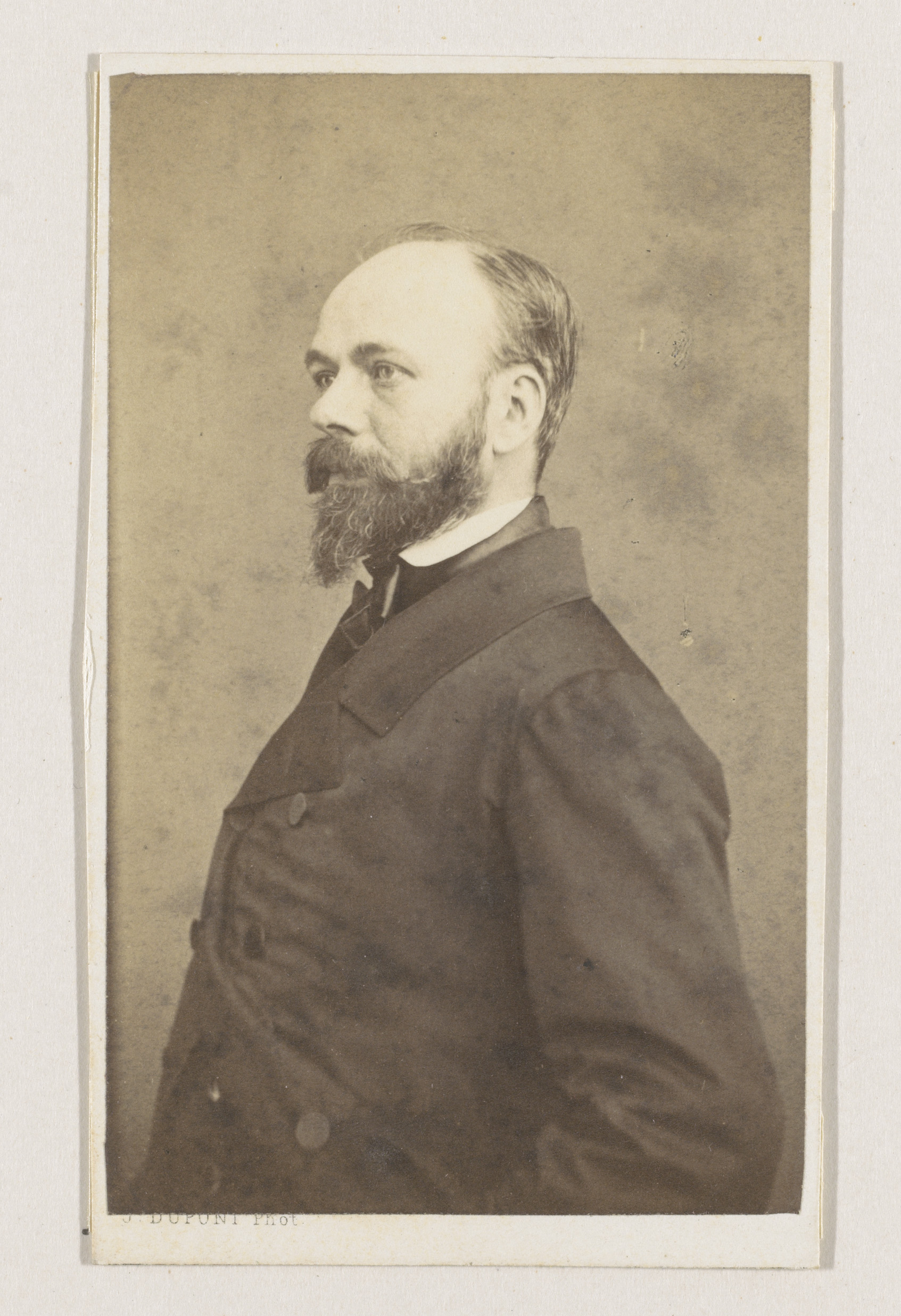
Louis Van Kuyck

Jean Louis Van Kuyck (4 August 1821, Antwerp – 3 July 1871, Antwerp) was a Belgian genre painter. Many of his works featured animals; primarily horses.

== Biography ==
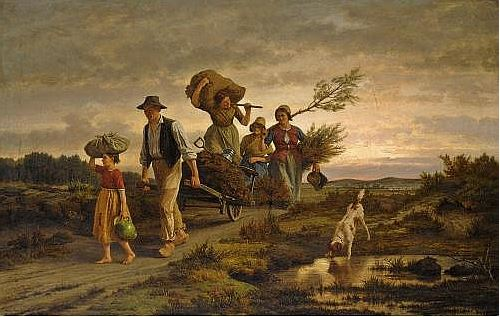
Returning from the Heather Harvest

His father, Antoine Van Kuyck, was a coppersmith; originally from Oosterhout. He was trained as a watchmaker, but worked at that trade for only a short time, before deciding to become a painter. The reason for his decision is unknown. In pursuit of this goal, he enrolled at the Royal Academy of Fine Arts in Antwerp, where he studied with Gustaaf Wappers. His first paintings were historical and genre scenes.

At the Antwerp Salon of 1843, he exhibited a scene depicting "Fransken", a character from the short story, "Hoe men schilder wordt" (How one Becomes a Painter), by Hendrik Conscience. Three years later, he presented "Henri IV bij de molenaar Michaud" (Henry IV with the Miller, Michaud), a "fait-divers" (scene from daily life, with historical figures or events), which was a popular style of genre painting at the time. In 1849, he presented "Wijn, liefde en tabak" (Wine, Love and Tobacco).

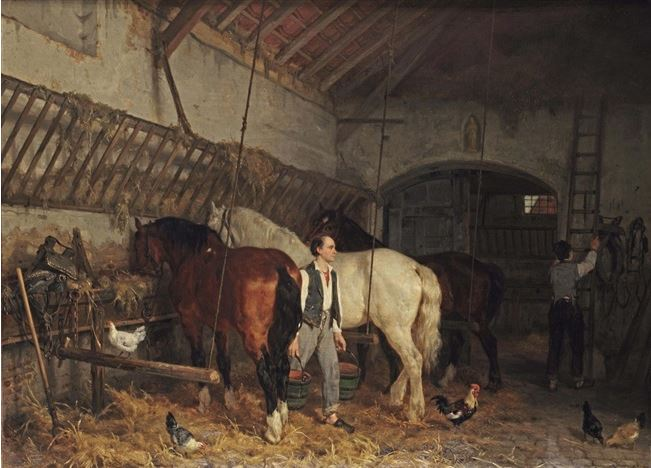
In the Stable

In the 1850s, he narrowed his themes to animal painting; predominantly horses with stables. This would eventually come to dominate his oeuvre.

An unusual incident was crucial to promoting his career. In 1852, Queen Victoria was sailing back to England, following a state visit with King Leopold I of Belgium. Her ship encountered a storm, and was forced to anchor on the Western Scheldt, near Terneuzen. When the storm had subsided a bit, the Royal party went to shore in a dinghy where, among other things, they toured a local farm. She was apparently impressed, or thought it was "quaint", and ordered a painting of the farm. That commission went to Van Kuyck. This story is attested to by the Queen's own diaries.

In 1871 his son, Frans, was stricken with typhus. Louis contracted the disease while caring for him, and died. Frans survived, and also became a well known painter.

== Sources ==
- Willem Flippo, Lexicon of the Belgian Romantic Painters, Ruygrok, 1981.
- Colette Delvoye, Norbert Hostyn, Van de os op de ezel. Belgische dierenschilders in de 19de eeuw, Gemeentekrediet van België, 1982
- Paul Piron, De Belgische beeldende kunstenaars uit de 19de en 20ste eeuw, Art in Belgium, 1999 ISBN 90-76676-01-1
- Wim & Greet Pas, Dictionnaire biographique arts plastiques en Belgique. Peintres-sculpteurs-graveurs 1800-2002, De Gulden Roos, 2002 ISBN 978-90-7613-802-2
