= Egide Linnig =

Belgian painter, draughtsman and engraver

- Born: Egide Linnig; 25 August 1821; Antwerp, United Kingdom of the Netherlands
- Died: 13 October 1860 (aged 39); Sint Willebrord, Belgium
- Education: Antwerp Academy of Fine Arts
- Occupation: Painter
- Parent(s): Pieter-Josef Linnig and Catharina Josephina Leys.

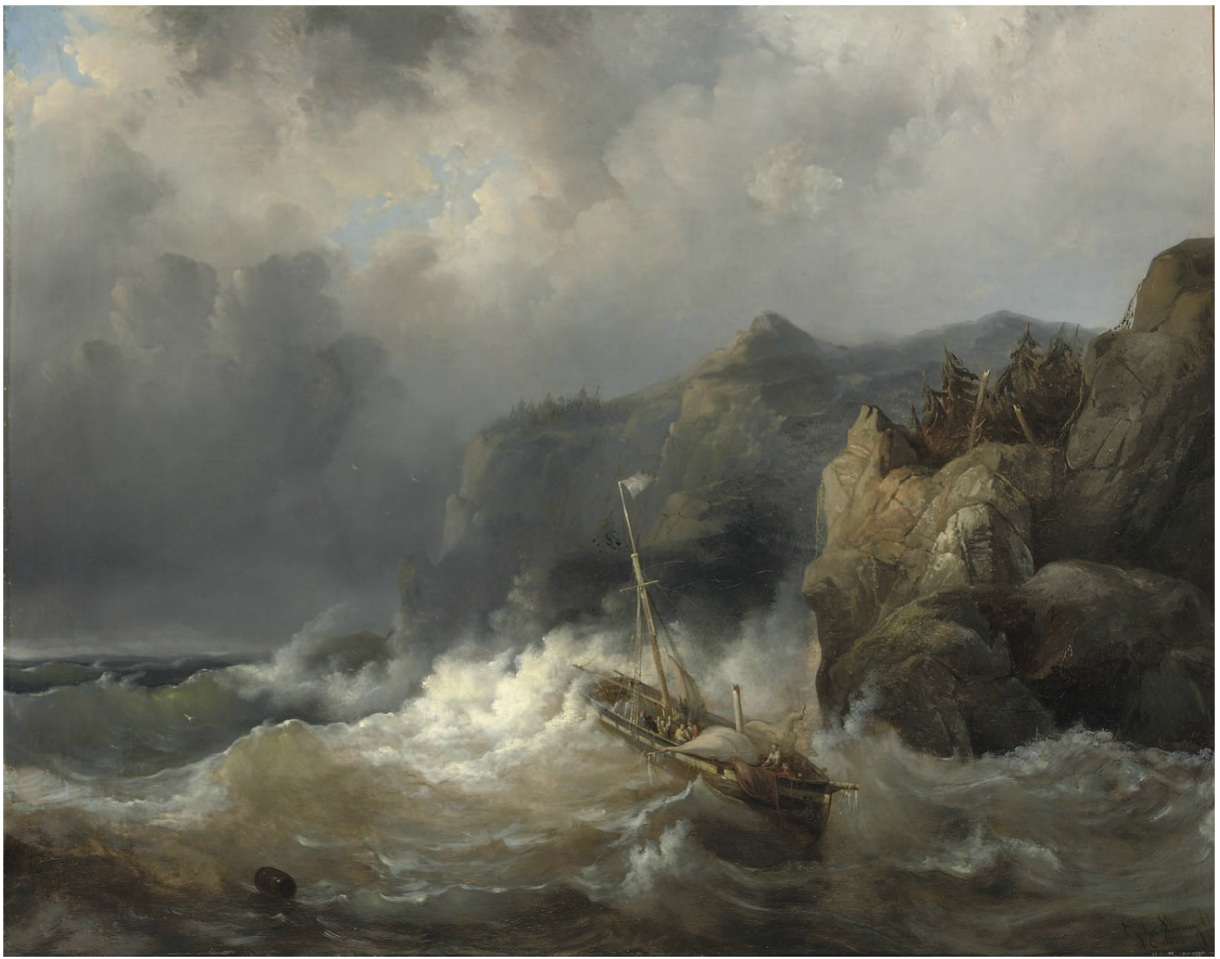
Shipwreck off a rocky coast

Egide Linnig or Egidius Linnig (25 August 1821 – 13 October 1860) was a Belgian painter, draughtsman and engraver who is best known for his marine art and occasional genre scenes. He was one of the first realist engravers in Belgium.

== Life ==
Egide Linnig was born in Antwerp as the son of Pieter-Josef Linnig (born in Aschbach, Rhineland-Palatinate in Germany) and Catharina Josephina Leys. His father was a cabinetmaker. He had two older brothers (Jan Theodoor) Jozef Linnig and Willem Linnig the Elder who both became painters and engravers.

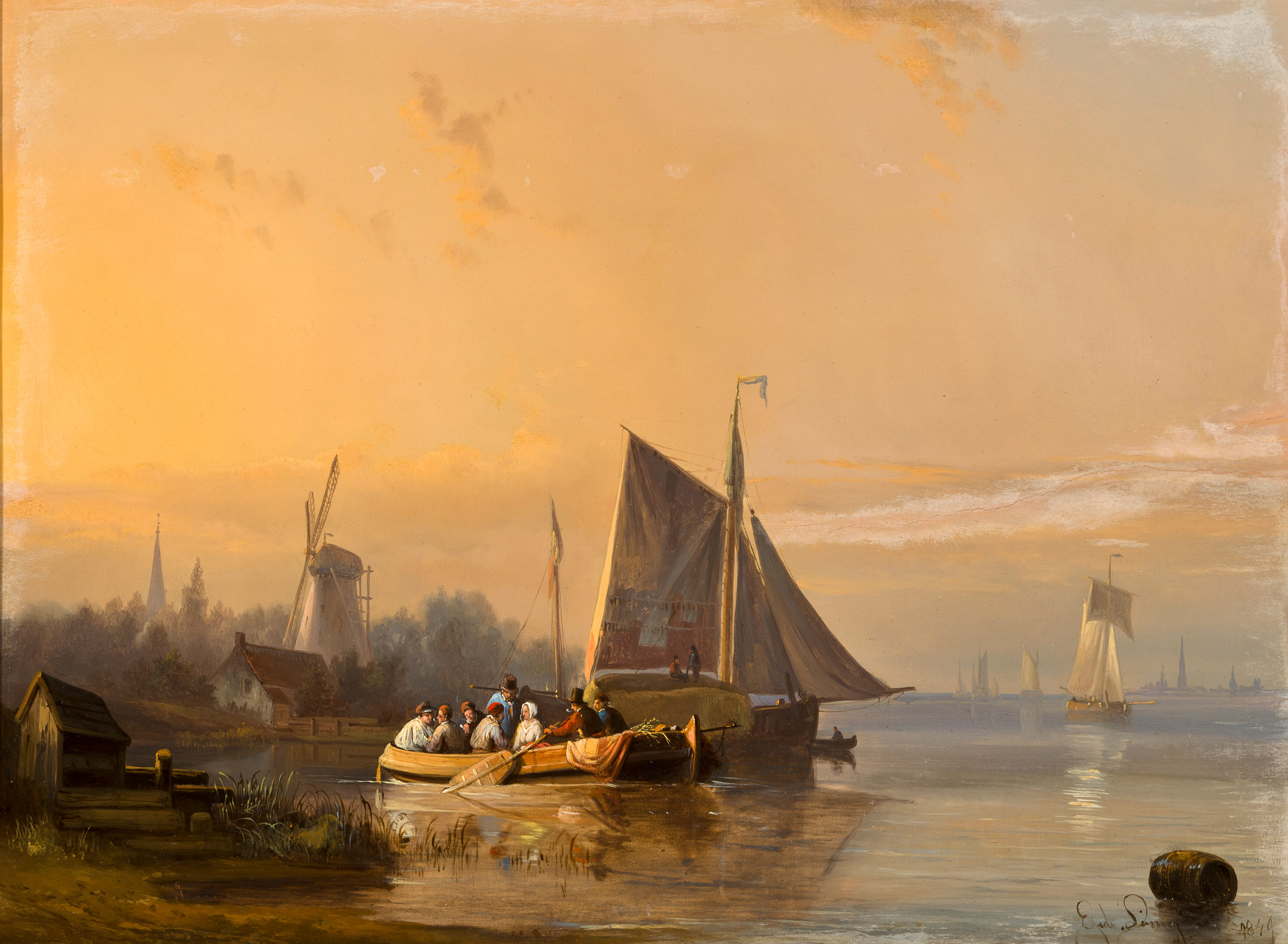
River scene at dusk

From 1834 Linnig studied at the Antwerp Academy of Fine Arts. Linnig was not happy with the emphasis placed on history painting by Mattheus Ignatius van Bree, the director of the academy. Linnig was from the start more attracted to the marine genre and took advantage of van Bree's death in 1839 to change his teacher to Jacques van Gingelen, a landscape painter and engraver. Linnig's classmates and contemporaries during those years included François Lamorinière, Hendrik Frans Schaefels, Lucas Victor Schaefels, Louis Van Kuyck, Karel Verlat and Henri Adolphe Schaep. During his studies at the academy, Linnig made many works from life, particularly of the Scheldt river.

While still enrolled at the academy, Linnig participated in the Triennial Salon of Antwerp in 1840 exhibiting two marine paintings, Fishing for Herring on the Dogger Bank and Coast near Zierikzee. In 1842 Linnig decided to put an end to his academic studies. In the summer of the following year he joined the crew of fishing boats in order to study all ship maneuvers in detail. Linnig would in later years continue to take small sea trips for inspiration. One of the trips inspired him to the painting The brig 'Timor' shipwrecked off the English coast, which he exhibited at the Triennial Salon in Brussels in 1842.

In 1844, the year of his marriage, Linnig and his brother Willem spent some time in The Hague. In the Mauritshuis museum in The Hague, he studied the works of old and contemporary masters. Linnig later wrote that this trip to The Netherlands was decisive for the development of his conception of art and that this new conception was reflected in his composition Shipwreck on the English coast. He submitted this work to the 1845 Triennial Salon in Brussels. In 1847 Linnig sailed to Norway. In or shortly before 1848 he moved from Antwerp to St Willibrords.

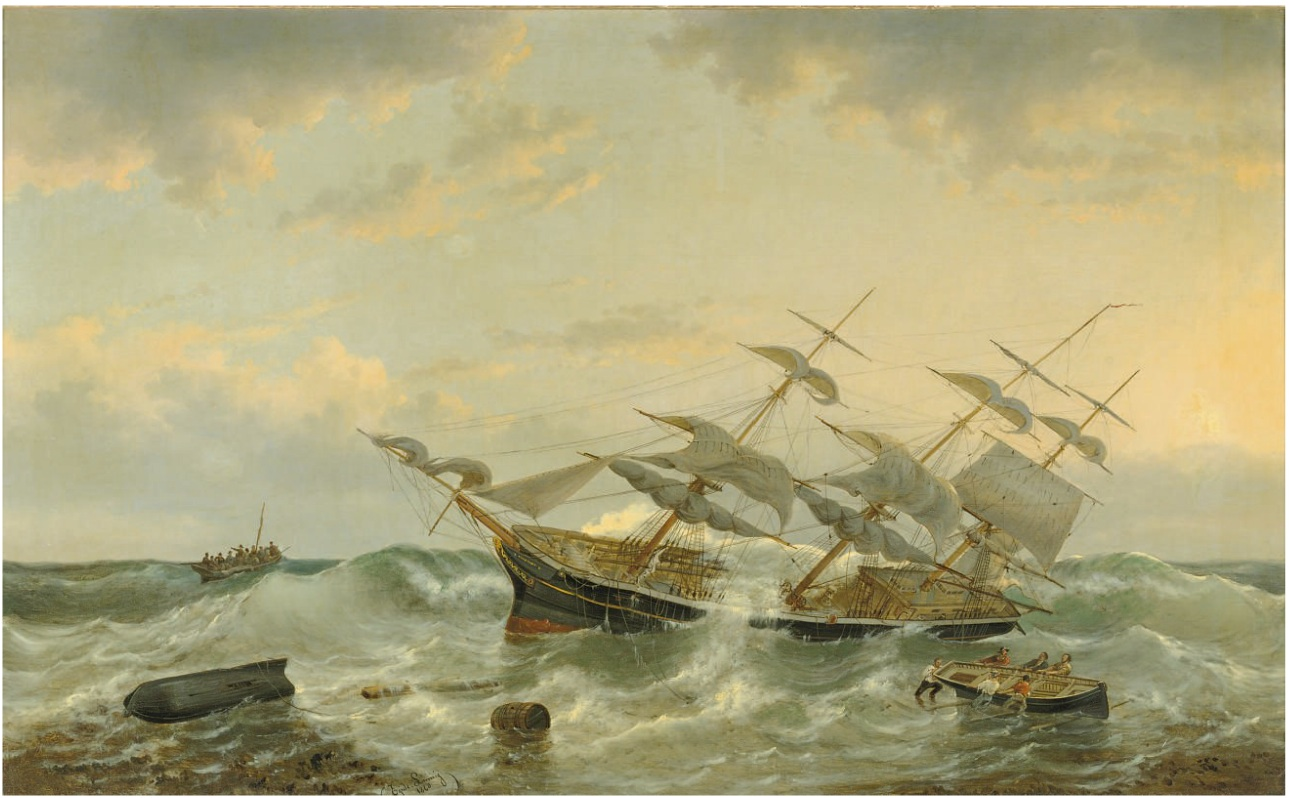
The three-master 'Constant' off the coast of New Guinea

Linnig presented four works at the Antwerp Salon of 1849. These were ordinary marines as well as ship portraits. From 1849 onwards Linnig regularly exhibited in Germany, where his marines met with success and were collected by several museum. In the late 1840s and early 1850s Linnig participated a total of three times in the "Exhibition of Living Masters" in the Netherlands with the following works: The wreckage of a Sardinian vessel (The Hague, 1847), Storm (Rotterdam, 1848) and The wintering of Barends and van Heemskerk on Nova Zembla. The last work was inspired by the poem of the Dutch poet Hendrik Tollens on the 16th century shipping disasters of Dutch ships near Novaya Zemlya (The Hague, 1851).

From the 1850s onwards Linnig produced many marines. These were either general genre scenes or scenes depicting a named ship playing a principal role in the action. The latter were a form of combination between a ship portrait and general marine painting and were usually made on the commission of shipping companies and ship captains. An example of the latter category is The three-master Constant off the coast of New Guinea. It depicts the trading vessel the 'Constant' after it ran on a coral reef off the coast of a small island near New Guinea on 15 June 1858. It also shows how, after abandoning ship, the crew tries to go on land after the lifeboats sprang a leak.

Throughout the 1850s Linnig continued to make submissions to the Salons in Antwerp and Brussels.

Linnig died in Sint Willibrords on 16 October 1860. The cause of death was pneumonia, which he had contracted after he missed his jump from a gig and had fallen into the water.

Florent Crabeels was his pupil.

== Work ==
=== General ===
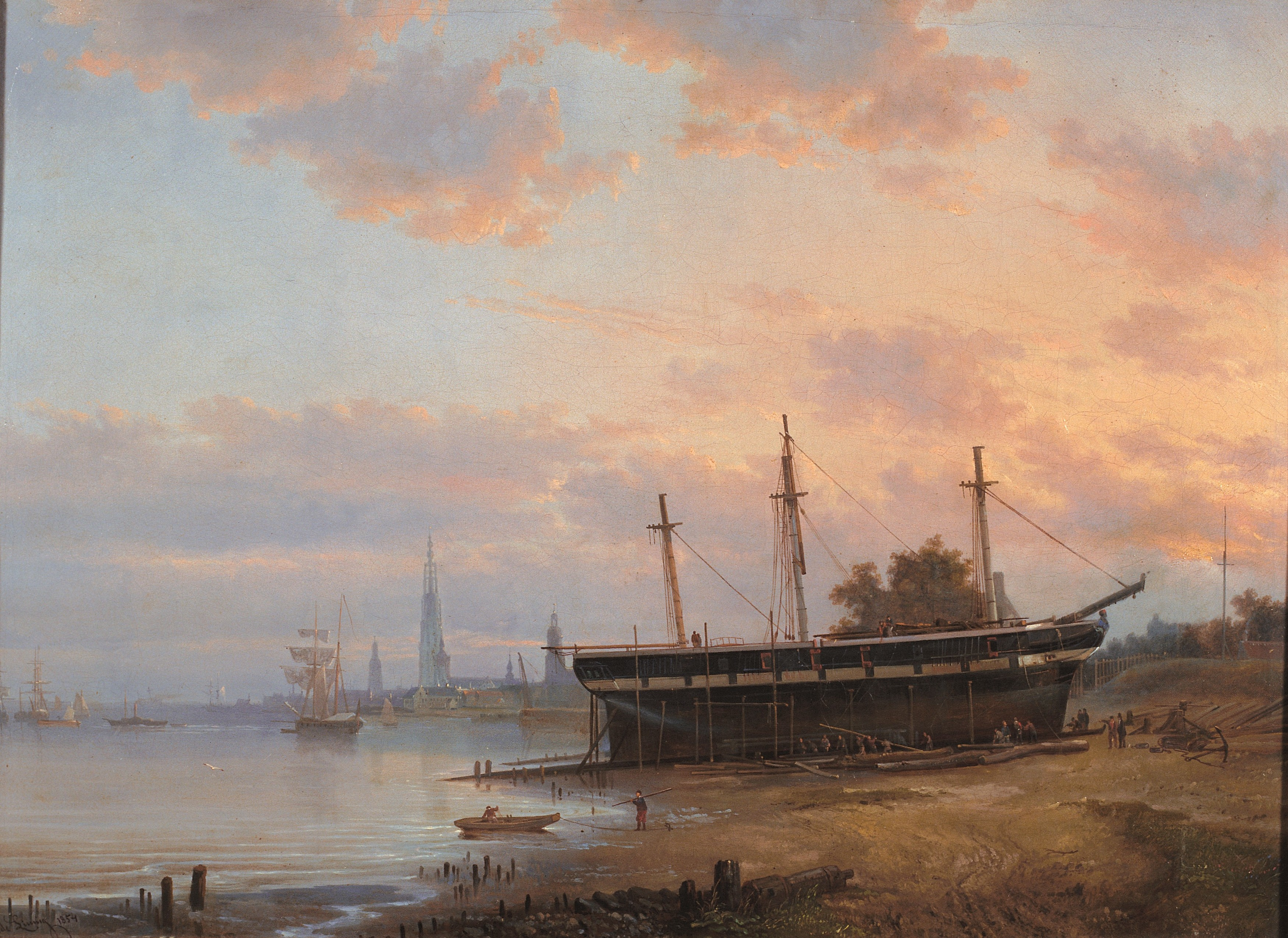
Belgian merchant navy frigate Macassar

The subject matter of Linnig's work is mainly marines, ship portraits and coastal landscapes. He also made some genre scenes. The Scheldt in Antwerp up to its estuary was one of his main sources of inspiration. He also had an interest in depicting the Flemish coastal towns, as evidenced by his prints with coastal landscapes in Nieuwpoort and Wenduine. Linnig often signed and dated his work and occasionally drew the Masonic symbol of the square and compass alongside his signature as he was a Freemason.

Linnig was an important representative of the Romantic-Realist movement in Belgian marine painting. This movement saw its heyday between 1830 and 1860. Linnig is a typical representative of this movement in the choice of his subject matter, which covers the usual romantic scenes such as storms, high seas and shipwrecks. He had a special preference for the 'extreme moments' of the day: sunrise and sunset, the start and end of the day, when the color contrasts are the most intense and the colors are striking. Other extreme moments which he treated regularly were skies at the time of a threatening storm with lightning and heavy cloud masses that create a contrast between the sunny foreground and the dark background scenery or vice versa.

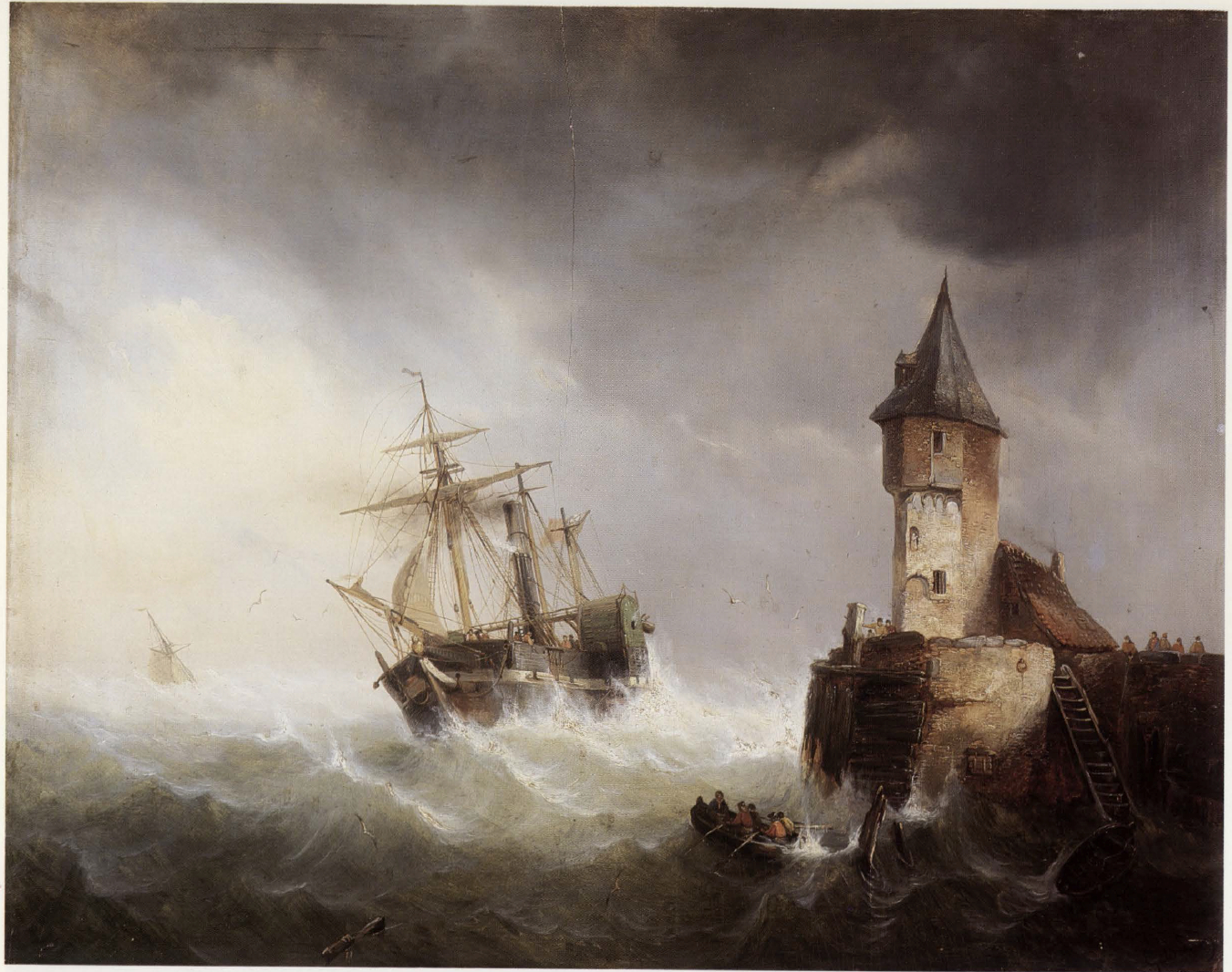
The Soho enters the Scheldt estuary near Flushing

A good example of Linnig's Romantic pursuit of effects can be seen in The Soho enters the Scheldt estuary near Flushing (1843, Museum aan de Stroom), which is perhaps one of the most impressive paintings in his oeuvre. Linnig treats the subject in a particularly original manner by portraying the "Soho", a steamer of the London General Steam & Navigation Company, not as seen from its starboard or its port side as was customary, but rather in frontal view. As a result, the steamer is shown in extreme foreshortening and the bow of the ship gets the full attention. This special angle, combined with details such as the ship's powerful radar unit, the rough sea, the stormy weather and the dilapidated guardhouse create an energetic and dynamic composition.

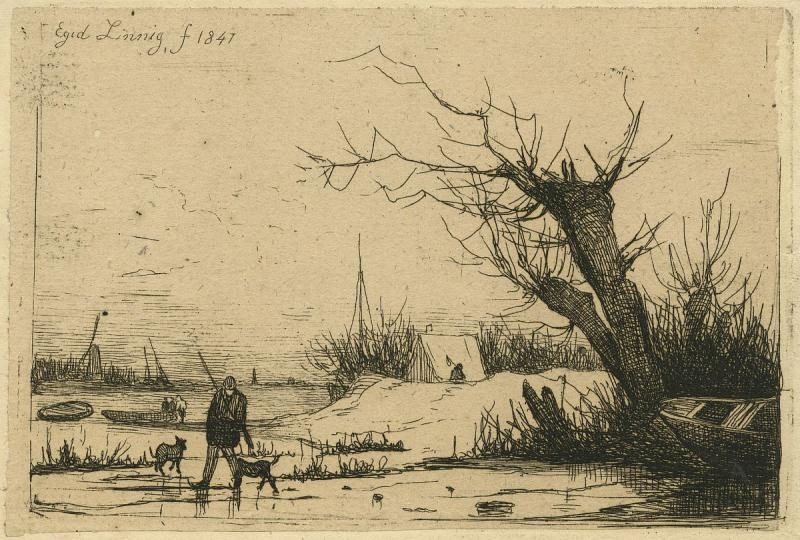
Hunter on the ice

Linnig's marine paintings are always well balanced and pay particular attention to topographical accuracy. His work provides an important testimony on the history of seafaring since he worked during the pivotal period that marked the transition from sailing ships to steamships. His works are also important documents on the shipping activities and wharves in and around Antwerp at the time.

=== Graphic work ===
Linnig trained early on as an etcher and was one of the first to practise this art as an autonomous genre. He is regarded as one of the first realistic engravers in Belgium. His etchings, while technically finished, preserve a character of free and swift execution. The subject matter of his graphic work included marines and ship portraits as in his painterly oeuvre and extended beyond this to coastal landscapes, topographical views of harbours and city scenes as well as genre scenes with people such as fishermen and women busy on the beach, in ports or on markets. He also engraved a portrait of himself in the year before he died, which shows the bearded artist with hollowed out cheeks.

Linnig's drawings were used by other engravers as the design of engravings and lithographs.
