= Jozef Linnig =

Belgian painter, watercolorist, engraver, art historian and art dealer

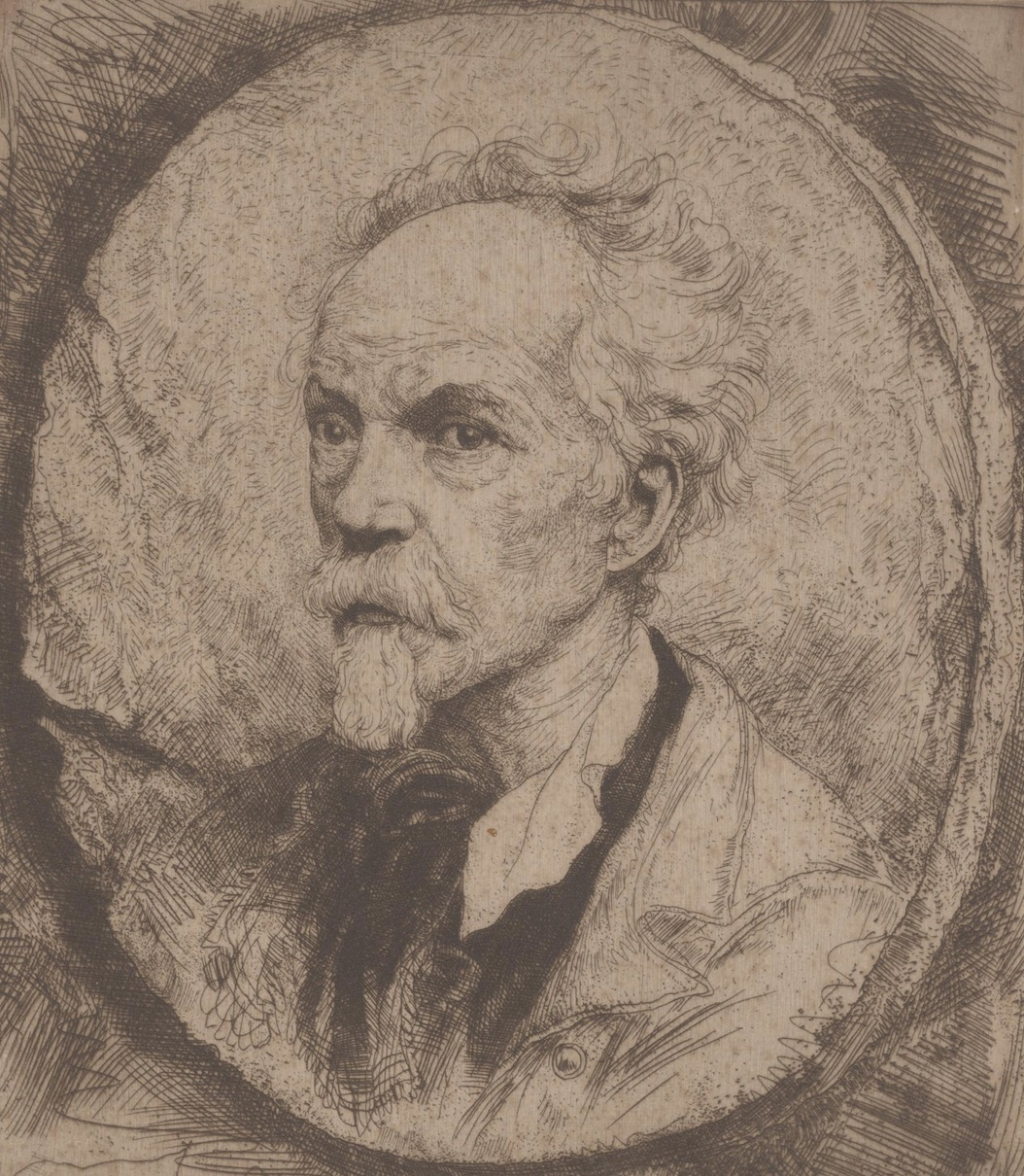
- Self-portrait
- Born: 15 April 1815; Antwerp, Belgium
- Died: 12 November 1891 (aged 76); Antwerp, Belgium
- Education: Antwerp Academy of Fine Arts
- Occupations: Painter, watercolorist, engraver, art historian and art dealer
- Parent(s): Pieter-Josef Linnig and Catharina Josephina Leys
- Relatives: Willem and Egide (brothers)

Jozef Linnig or Jan Theodoor Jozef Linnig (15 May 1815 in Antwerp – 12 November 1891 in Antwerp) was a Belgian painter, watercolorist, engraver, art historian and art dealer. He is best known for his drawings of the old quarters of Antwerp and is considered the topographer of old Antwerp. He also co-authored a book on 19th-century Dutch and Belgian painter-engravers.

== Life ==
Jozef Linnig was born in Antwerp as the son of Pieter-Josef Linnig (born in Aschbach, Rhineland-Palatinate in Germany) and Catharina Josephina Leys. His father was a cabinetmaker. His two younger brothers Willem and Egide were both painters and engravers. His two nephews Willem and Ben Linning were also involved in art as painter/engravers or art historians.

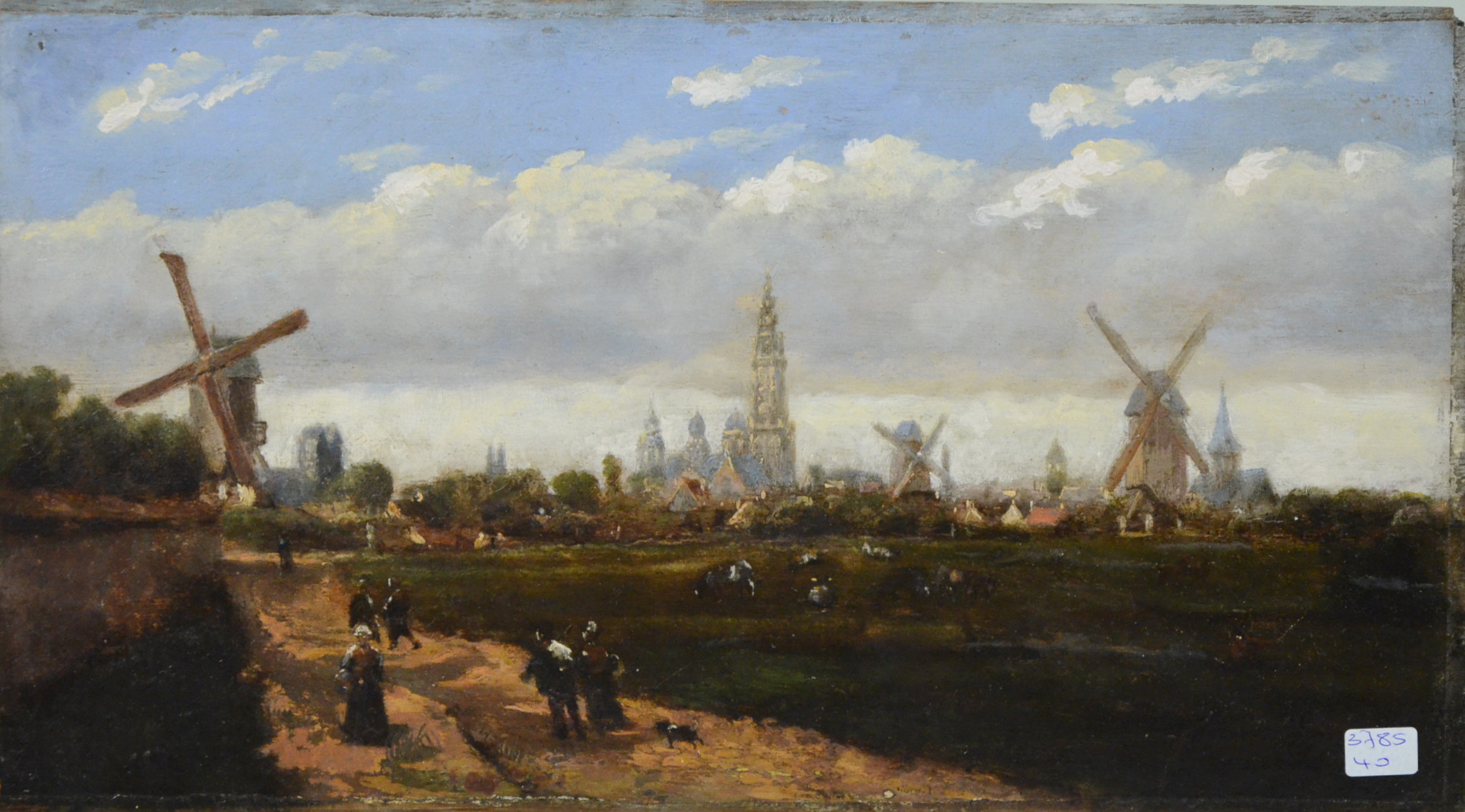
Dutch landscape

Jozef Linnig trained at the Antwerp Academy of Fine Arts where Erin Corr taught him engraving and Jan Baptiste de Jonghe painting.

Jozef Linnig made many drawings and etchings of the old quarters and monuments of Antwerp. In 1868 he published a 'Historisch album der stad Antwerpen: verzameling van gezichten en gedenkteekens van vroegere tyden' ('Historical album of the city of Antwerp: collection of views and memorials of the past') at Buschmann, Antwerp. The book was co-authored by Frans Hendrik Mertens and illustrated with prints etched by Linnig. The prints are a valuable treasure trove of documentation on old parts of Antwerp that have since disappeared or changed a lot. For instance, one of the prints depicts the monumental water pump on the Veemarkt, which no longer exists.

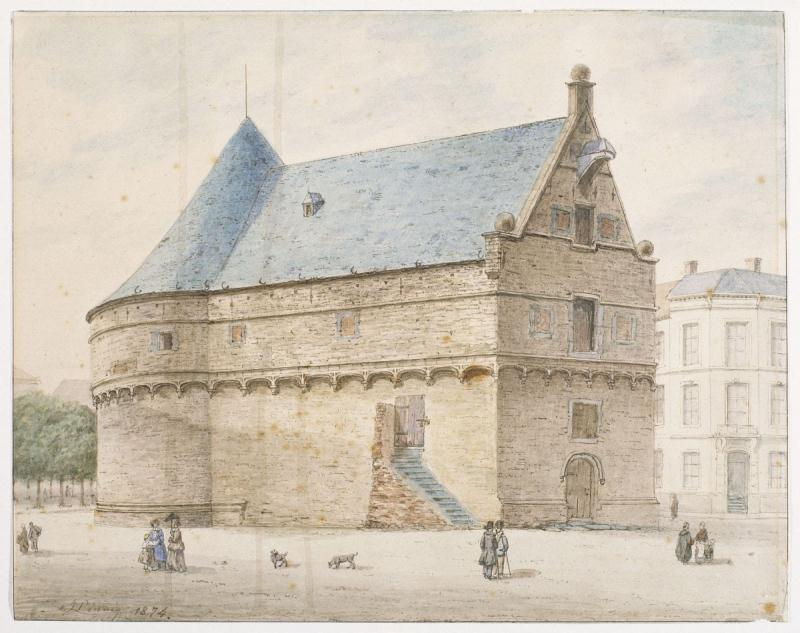
View of the Blauwe Toren

Jozef Linnig owned an extensive collection of contemporary graphic art from Belgium and the Netherlands. He used this collection to compile a descriptive catalogue on contemporary Dutch and Belgian engravers, which was published in Brussels under the title 'Le Peintre-Graveur hollandais et belge du XIXe siècle' ('The Dutch and Belgian painter-engraver of the 19th century') (1874–1879). The book was co-authored by Theodor Hippert. In 1878 Jozef Linnig donated his collection of prints to the city of Antwerp. It now forms part of the collection of the Plantin-Moretus Museum in Antwerp.

Linnig's antique collection appears not to have been very impressive. In the summer of 1885 Vincent van Gogh asked his brother Theo if he had any contacts in Antwerp. Theo gave him the name of Jozef Linnig whom he knew as an art dealer. After arriving in Antwerp, Vincent went to various art dealers to see what they had on offer. His visit to Linnig's shop left Vincent underwhelmed. He wrote to his brother that Linnig had "nothing but miserable old paintings" and that Linnig was a 'discouraged' man.

Linnig died in Antwerp on 12 November 1891.

== Work ==
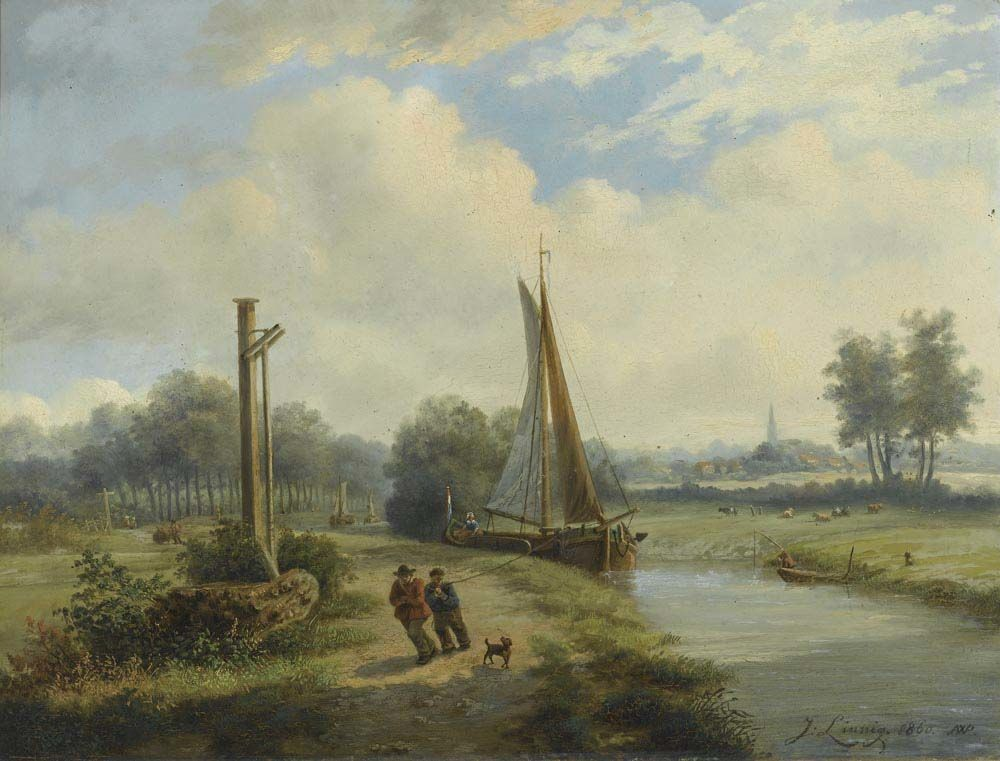
The Breda Canal

Jozef Linnig was a painter, etcher and draughtsman of landscapes, cityscapes, architectural and topographical views.

Jozef Linnig was especially famous for his numerous scenes of Antwerp and its surrounding districts. Throughout his life, he drew every possible corner of his native city. He usually commenced with pencil sketches, from which he developed watercolours and finally etchings.
