= Antwerp International Exposition (1885) =

World's fair held in Antwerp, Belgium

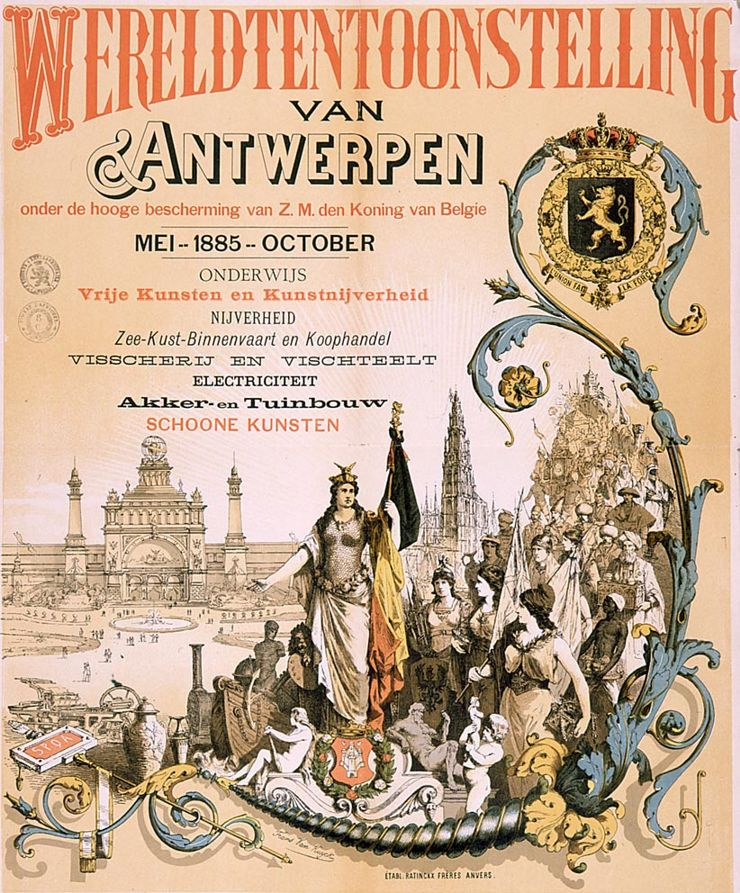
Poster designed by Frans Van Kuyck

The Antwerp International Exposition (Dutch: Wereldtentoonstelling van Antwerpen; French: Exposition internationale d'Anvers) of 1885 was a world's fair held in Antwerp, Belgium, between 2 May and 2 November 1885. It covered 54.3 acres (220,000 m^{2}), attracted 3.5 million visits and broke even after spending 4 million Belgian francs There were 25 official participating nations including: Austria, Canada, France, Germany, Great Britain, the Ottoman Empire, Portugal, Serbia, Spain, Romania, the United States and some South American states. Australian wool growers sent exhibitions and won prizes.

Taking place 20 years after the accession of King Leopold II, and the same year as the creation of the Congo Free State, the fair was the first in which a Congolese village was displayed, a feature that also appeared in the later 1897 Brussels fair.

== See also ==
- Human zoo
- Antwerp International Exposition (1894)
