= Willem Linnig the Younger =

Belgian painter and engraver

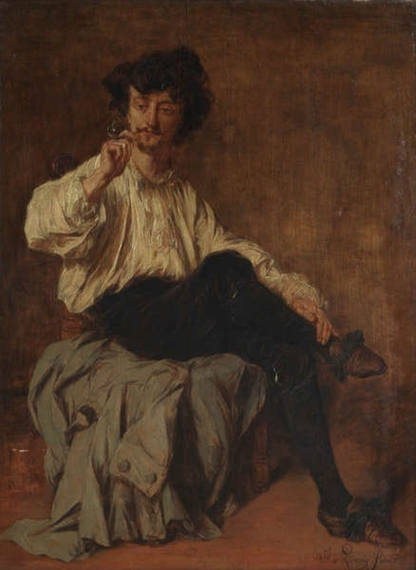
Self-portrait

Willem Linnig the Younger (20 August 1842 in Antwerp – 3 September 1890 in Antwerp) was a Belgian painter and engraver who is best known for his history and genre scenes, landscapes and still lifes. He taught for some time at the Fine Arts School of Weimar.

== Life ==
Willem Linnig (known as "The Younger") was born in Antwerp as the son of Willem Linnig the Elder. There were a number of artists in his family. His father was a painter and engraver who is known for his history and genre scenes. He had two uncles (Jan Theodoor) Jozef Linnig and Egide Linnig who were both painters and engravers. His younger brother Ben Linnig (1860–1929) was also a painter.

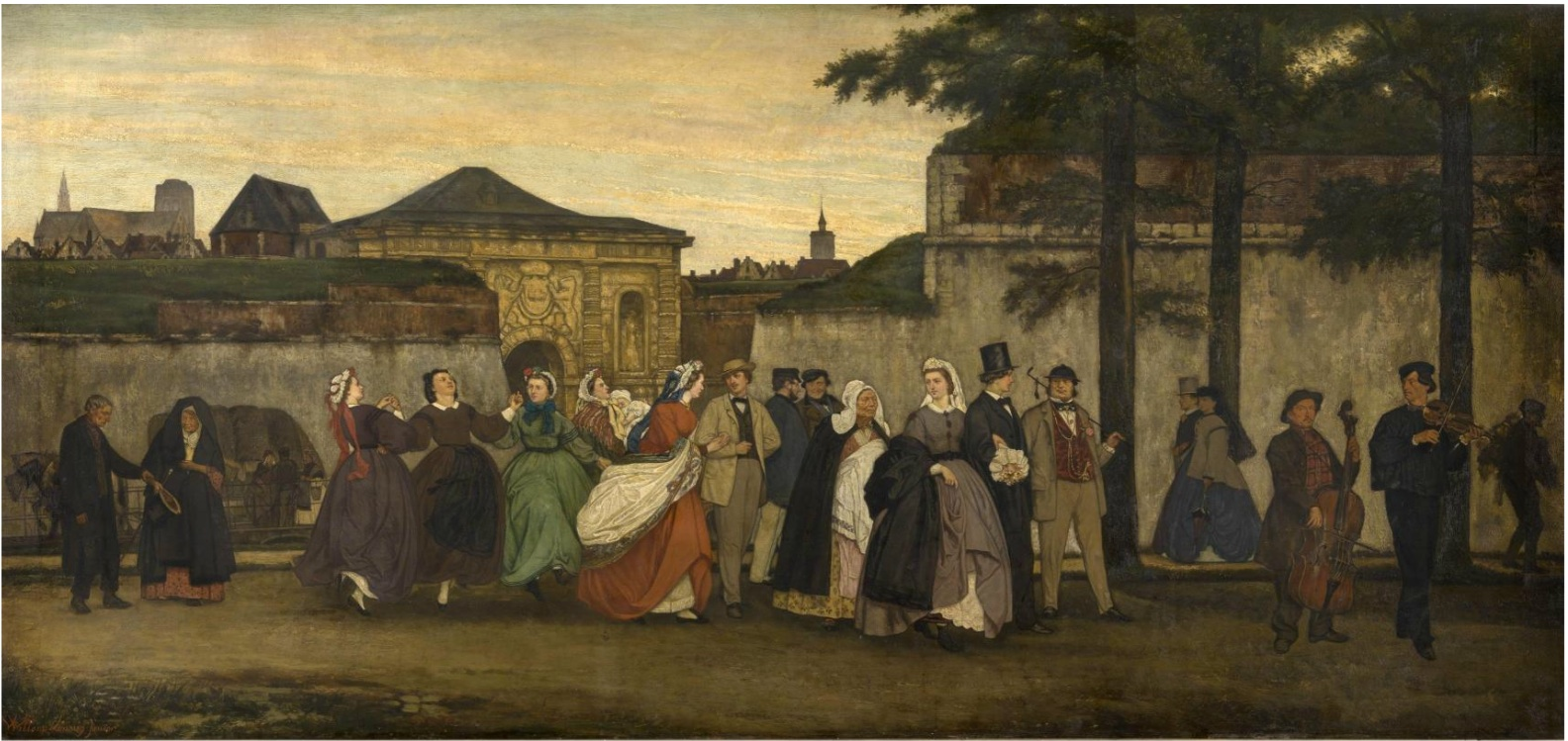
Wedding in Antwerp

Willem Linnig trained with his father and entered his father's studio at the age of 18. He made copies after the drawings of Willem Jacob Herreyns, an important Antwerp painter from around the turn of the 18the century. He also studied the work of Rembrandt. Linnig went on to study at the Antwerp Academy of Fine Arts, where the painter Jan Antoon Verschaeren, himself a pupil of Herreyns, was one of his teachers. Linnig came into conflict with the director of the Antwerp Academy Nicaise de Keyser. The conflict was caused by Linnig's refusal to conform with de Keyser's opposition against line and preference for the use of the stump to blur lines. Linnig was sent away from the academy by de Keyser with the words "Leave, you will never be a painter."

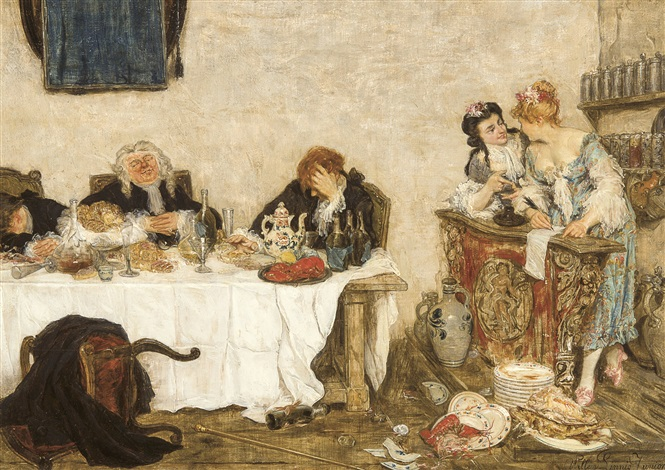
Rabelais' quarter of an hour

Linnig returned to study with his father and also spent a lot of time studying after nature. After a year he returned to show Nicaise de Keyser a folder of his works. De Keyser was so impressed that he offered Linnig to return to the academy. Linnig decided not to take up the offer.

He exhibited the first time in 1867. He gradually started to gain recognition with his realistic works. After seeing some of Linnig's works, Charles Alexander, Grand Duke of Saxe-Weimar-Eisenach invited the artist to teach at the Weimar Saxon Grand Ducal Art School. Willem Linnig started to teach in Weimar from 1876. His father also joined him as a teacher in Weimar. The pair staid on until 1882. Linnig's students in Weimar included Hermann Schlittgen, Paul Baum und Leopold Graf von Kalckreuth.

During his time in Weimar Grand Duke Charles Alexander commissioned Linnig to create three compositions on the life of Martin Luther for Wartburg castle. The Grand Duke also made the artist an officer in the Grand Ducal order of the White Falcon.

Willem Linnig and his father were among a large number of Antwerp artists who established the Association of Antwerp Etchers (Dutch: Vereeniging der Antwerpsche etsers, French: l'Association des aquafortistes anversois) in 1880. The Vereeniging published an annual album containing graphic works of its members.

Linnig died in Antwerp on 3 September 1890.

== Work ==
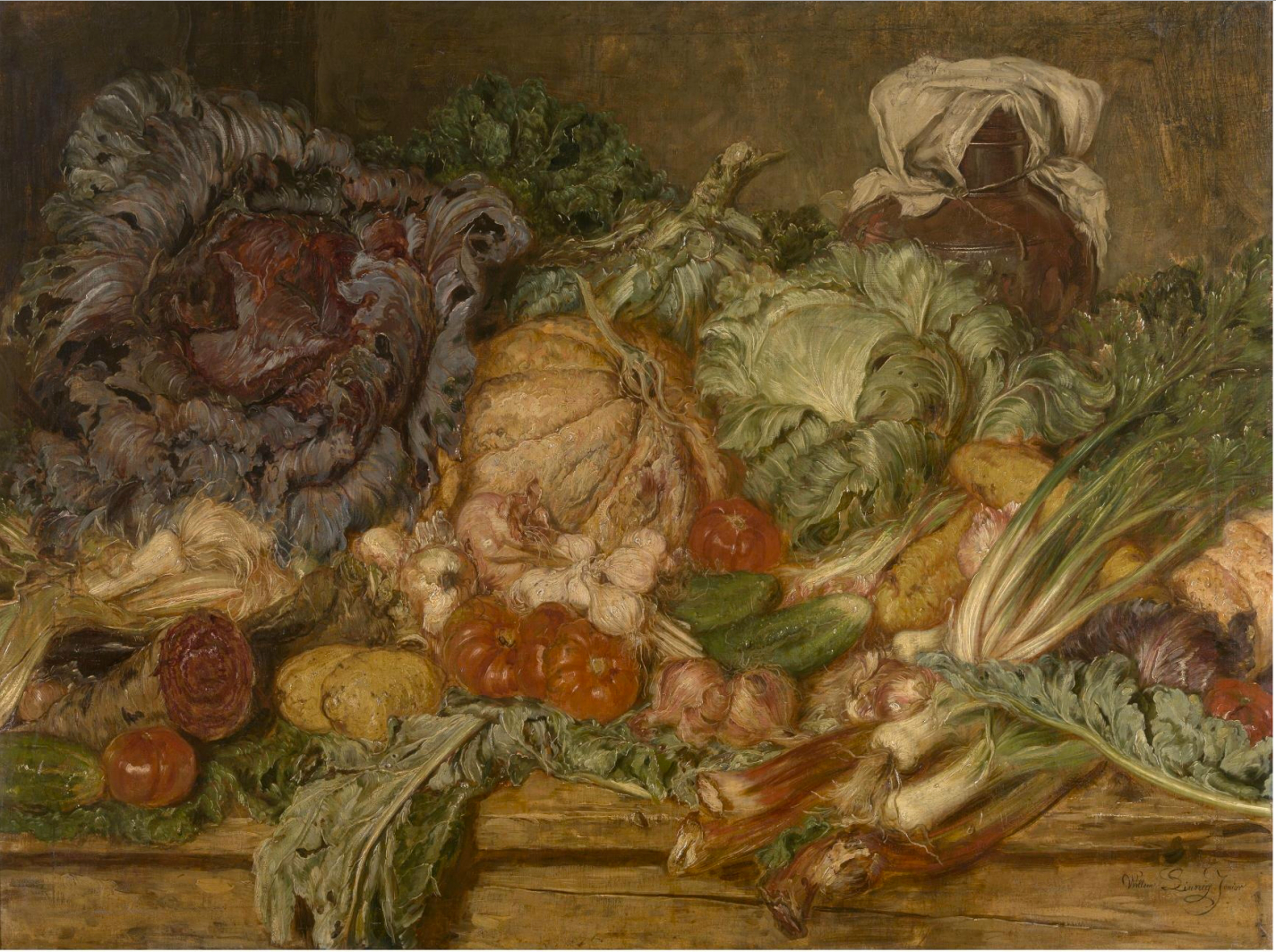
Vegetables

Willem Linnig was a painter and etcher who was very prolific. He left a large number of paintings and 123 etchings. He worked on a wide range of subjects: history and genre scenes, landscapes and still lifes.

His earliest works such as the Antwerp wedding are in a realist style and show his strong skills as a colorist. During his stay in Germany his subject matter and style became more Romantic. He was also influenced by the French artists of the 18th-century, which added a Manierist element to his work. After his return to Antwerp he painted mainly historical scenes not unlike those of the prominent history and genre painter Jan August Hendrik Leys who was one of his father's teachers.

Of the 123 etchings, which Linnig produced, 122 were of his own design and one a reproductive etching after the Nymphs and Satyrs of Rubens. In his graphic work he traced the lineaments with great care, but also displayed a great level of exuberance.
