= Léon Brunin =

Belgian painter (1861–1949)

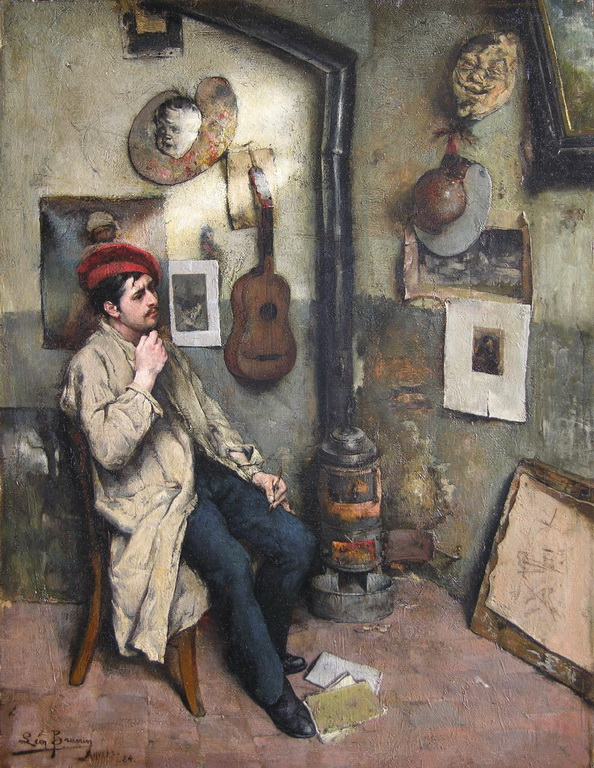
- Artist in his Workshop, 1884
- Born: November 20, 1861; Antwerp
- Died: March 13, 1949 (aged 87); Antwerp
- Resting place: Antwerpen Schoonselhof Communal Cemetery
- Education: Royal Academy of Fine Arts
- Known for: painting
- Notable work: Alchemist
- Style: Academic classicism
- Movement: als ik kan

Léon Brunin (20 November 1861 – 13 March 1949), also known as Léon de Meuter, was a Belgian painter and etcher.

== Life ==
Brunin was born in Antwerp, where he studied at the Royal Academy of Fine Arts. He first attended classes with the sculptor Frans Joris, then painters Polydore Beaufaux and Charles Verlat. He received a 3rd class medal on Salon des artistes français in 1892.

In 1883, Leon became one of the founders of the art circle als ik kan ("if I can") in which, in particular, Henry van de Velde began, but after five years he left the group. From 1886 he was friends with Dutch artists Matthijs Maris, Jacob Maris, Hendrik Willem Mesdag, Lawrence Alma-Tadema and the Italian painter Giovanni Segantini. From 1886 he taught at the Antwerp Academy of Fine Arts. At the turn of the 19th and 20th centuries, Brunin participated in exhibitions and auctions in Belgium, France, Germany and the USA. One of his students was Servais Detilleux, to whom we owe a 1929 Portrait de Madame Léon Brunin.

Contrary to his early work, such as self-portrait Artist in his Workshop, Brunin developed later a more conservative style, inspired mostly by Rembrandt and Henri de Braekeleer.

Léon Brunin was appointed Officer of the Order of the Crown and Knight of the Order of Leopold. He died in 1949.
