= Willem Linnig the Elder =

Belgian painter and engraver

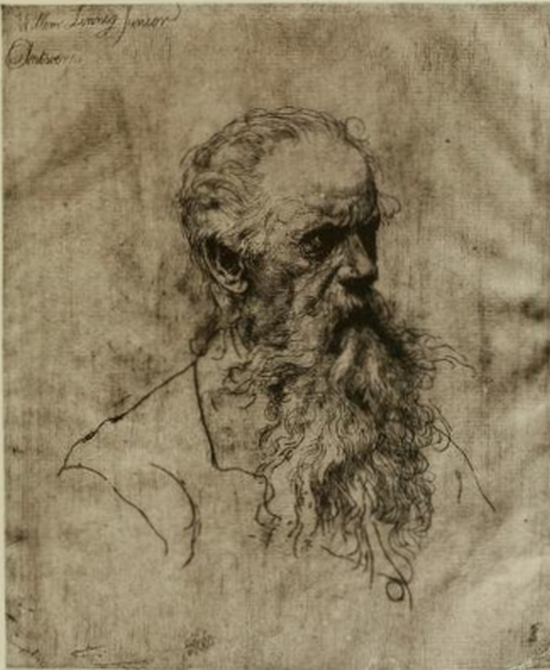
- Portrait of Willem Linning the Elder by his son
- Born: 7 August 1819; Antwerp, United Kingdom of the Netherlands
- Died: 8 August 1885 (aged 66); Antwerp, Belgium
- Education: Netherlands Institute for Art History
- Occupation: Painter
- Relatives: Willem Linnig the Younger (son)

Willem Linnig the Elder or Willem Linnig Senior (7 August 1819, in Antwerp – 8 August 1885, in Antwerp) was a Belgian painter and engraver who is best known for his history and genre scenes and interiors painted in a style which is reminiscent of 17th century Flemish and Dutch genre painting. He taught for some time at the Fine Arts School of Weimar.

== Life ==
Willem Linnig was born in Antwerp as the son of Pieter-Josef Linnig (born in Aschbach, Rhineland-Palatinate in Germany) and Catharina Josephina Leys. His father was a cabinetmaker. He had two brothers (Jan Theodoor) Jozef Linnig and Egide Linnig who both became artists.

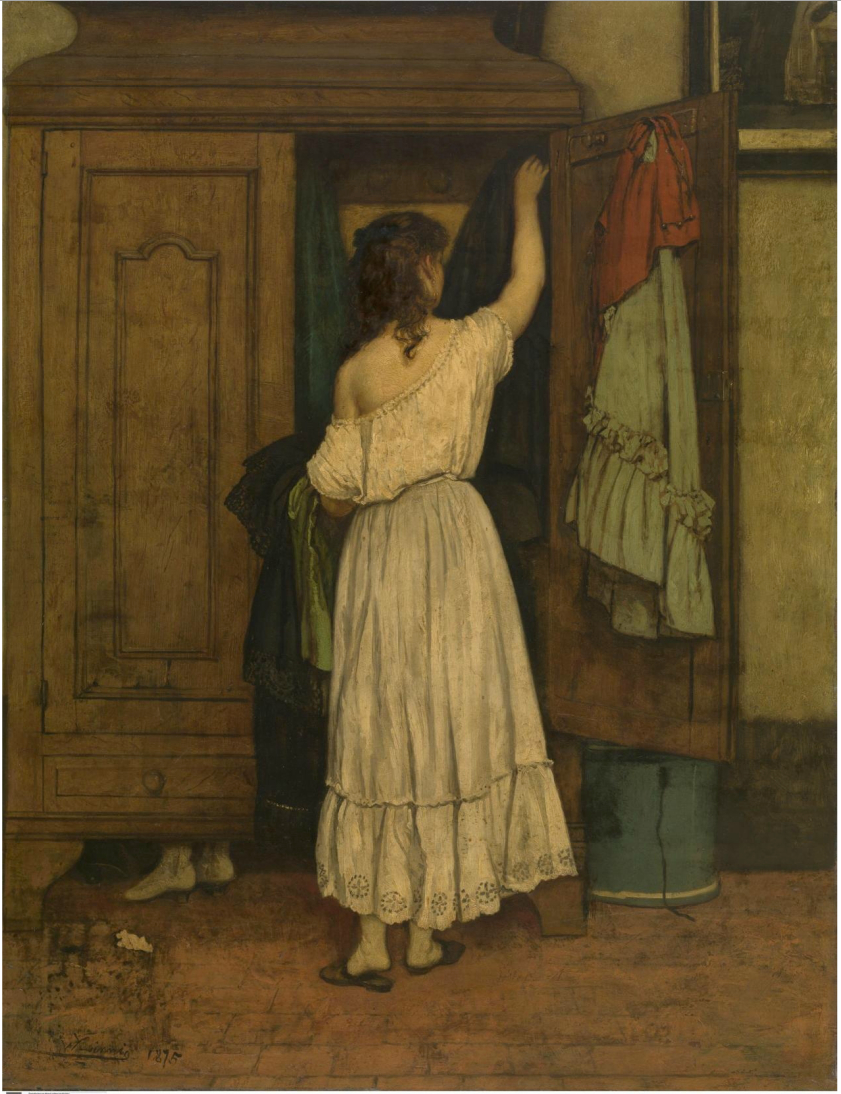
The closet

Linnig studied at the Antwerp Academy of Fine Arts, where the prominent history and genre painter Jan August Hendrik Leys was one of his teachers. One of his classmates was Victor Lagye.

In 1844, Willem Linnig and his brother Egide spent some time in The Hague. In the Mauritshuis museum in The Hague, they studied the works of old and contemporary masters. In 1847 the two brothers sailed to Norway. Willem later moved to Weimar where he established in 1877 a local association of etchers (Gesellschaft für Radierkunst).

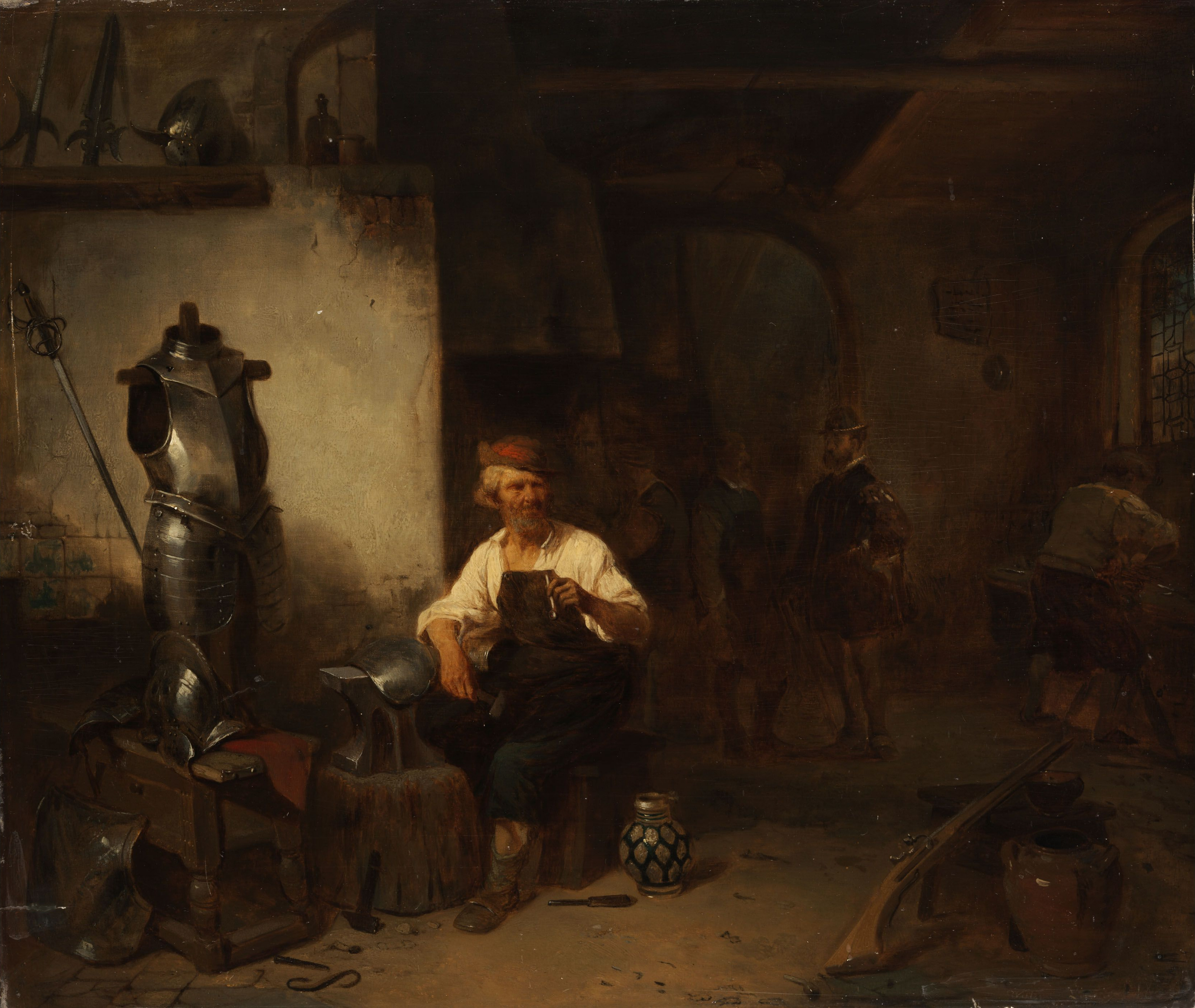
In the armory

He taught at the Weimar Saxon Grand Ducal Art School in Weimar from 1876 to 1882 and also served as its director. Willem's son, also named Willem, who had been trained by his father, joined him on Weimar and also taught at the local Art School.

Willem Linnig the Elder and his son Willem Linnig the Younger were among a large number of Antwerp artists who established the Association of Antwerp Etchers (Dutch: Vereeniging der Antwerpsche etsers, French: l'Association des aquafortistes anversois) in 1880. The Vereeniging would publish an annual album containing graphic works of its members.

Linnig died in Antwerp on 8 August 1885.

== Work ==
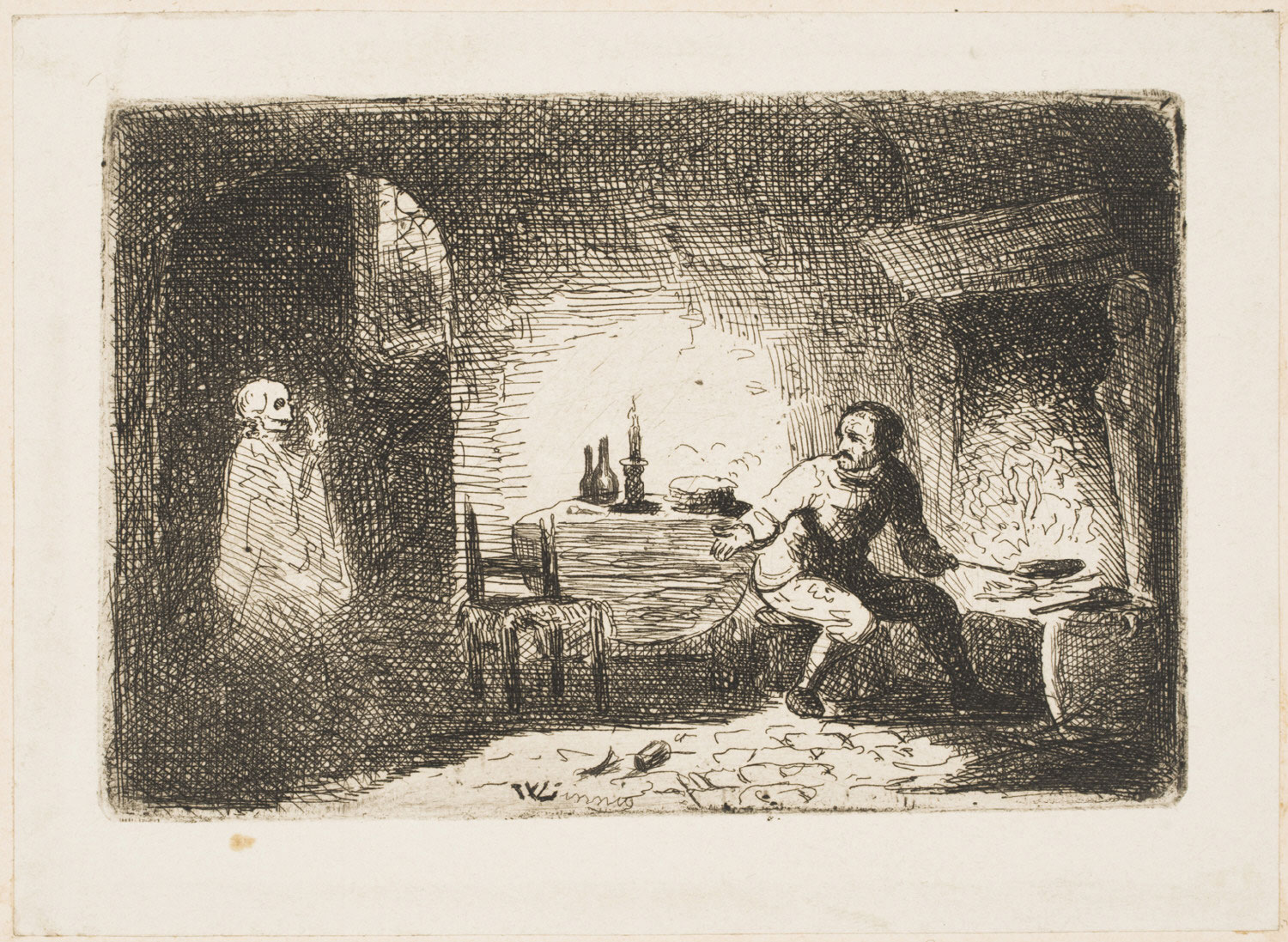
Death appearing to a man cooking

Willem Linnig was a painter and etcher whose main subject matter was history and genre scenes. Linnig's paintings show the influence of the style and subject matter of his teacher Jan August Hendrik Leys. Leys had made a name with his meticulously painted historical scenes recounting major events from Belgium's national history, which were regarded as a key to the country's national identity. In addition, Leys painted genre scenes inspired by 17th century genre painting.

Willem Linnig did not paint historical events like his master but was a faithful follower of Leys in his return to the themes and style of Flemish and Dutch genre painting of the 17th century. His works were able to reconstruct with scrupulous application the atmosphere of 17th century Antwerp. He had a preference for indoor scenes such as taverns, cottages, artist's workshops and bourgeois dwellings.
