= Arthur De Greef =

Arthur De Greef may refer to:

- Arthur De Greef (composer) (1862–1940), Belgian pianist and composer
- Arthur De Greef (tennis) (born 1992), Belgian tennis player
