= Moscheles =

Moscheles is a surname. Notable people with the surname include:

- Felix Moscheles (1833–1917), English painter, writer, and peace advocate
- Gary Moscheles (born 1971), alias of English electronic musician Mike Paradinas
- Ignaz Moscheles (1794–1870), Bohemian composer and pianist
- Margaret Moscheles (1854–1924), British painter, wife of Felix.
