= Brussels International Exposition =

Brussels International Exposition may refer to:

- Brussels International Exposition (1897)
- Brussels International Exposition (1910)
- Brussels International Exposition (1935)

== See also ==
- Expo 58
