= Giovanni Velluti =

Giovanni Velluti may refer to:

- Giovanni Velluti (castrato) (1780–1861), Italian castrato
- Giovanni Velluti (pianist) (born 1969), Italian pianist
