= Arthur De Greef (composer) =

Belgian musician

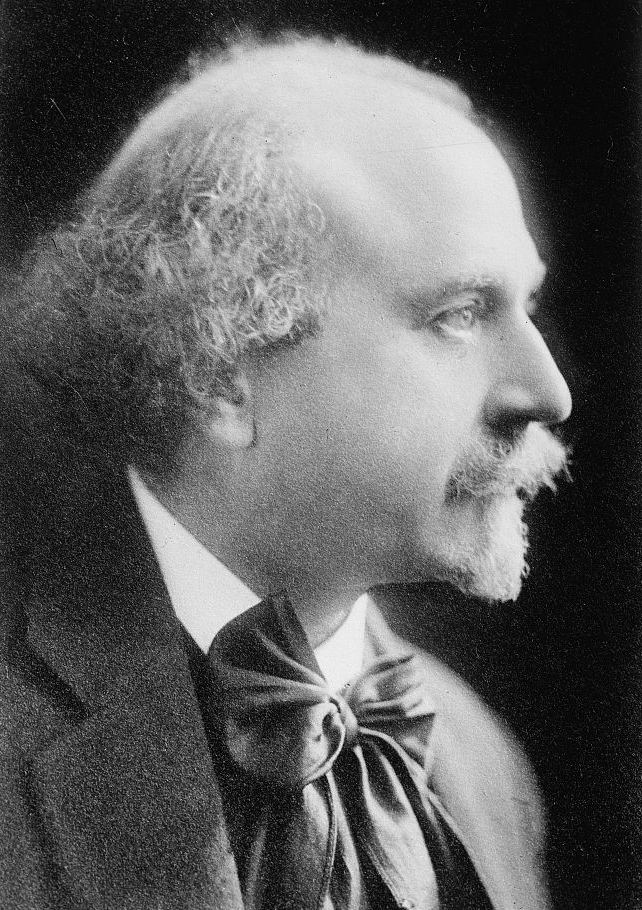
Arthur De Greef

Arthur De Greef (10 October 1862 – 29 August 1940) was a Belgian classical pianist and composer of the romantic era.

== Life and career ==
Born in Louvain, he won first prize in a local music competition at the age of 11 and subsequently enrolled at the Brussels Conservatoire. His main teacher there was Louis Brassin, a former pupil of Ignaz Moscheles, although he also took lessons from other staffers at the institution, including Joseph Dupont, François-Auguste Gevaert and Fernand Kufferath.

After graduating with high distinction from the Conservatoire at the age of 17, De Greef went to Weimar to complete his studies under Franz Liszt. He was a pupil of Liszt for two years.

Following the Weimar sojourn, De Greef embarked on a career as a concert pianist, travelling widely. He was a friend of Edvard Grieg, whose Piano Concerto he had played publicly in 1898, and who called him "the best performer of my music I have met with". In addition, he enjoyed the endorsement of Camille Saint-Saëns. British critic Jonathan Woolf has written: "De Greef was, in all respects, an intensely musical, non-sensationalist, eloquent and impressive musician and whilst not being averse to some of the interventionist tactics of his contemporaries (retouching of the score) remained sympathetically self-effacing".

De Greef composed a sizeable quantity of music, virtually all of which is now unknown. Among his works are two piano concertos. He was a devoted teacher, and taught piano at the Brussels Conservatoire for many years.

== Honours ==
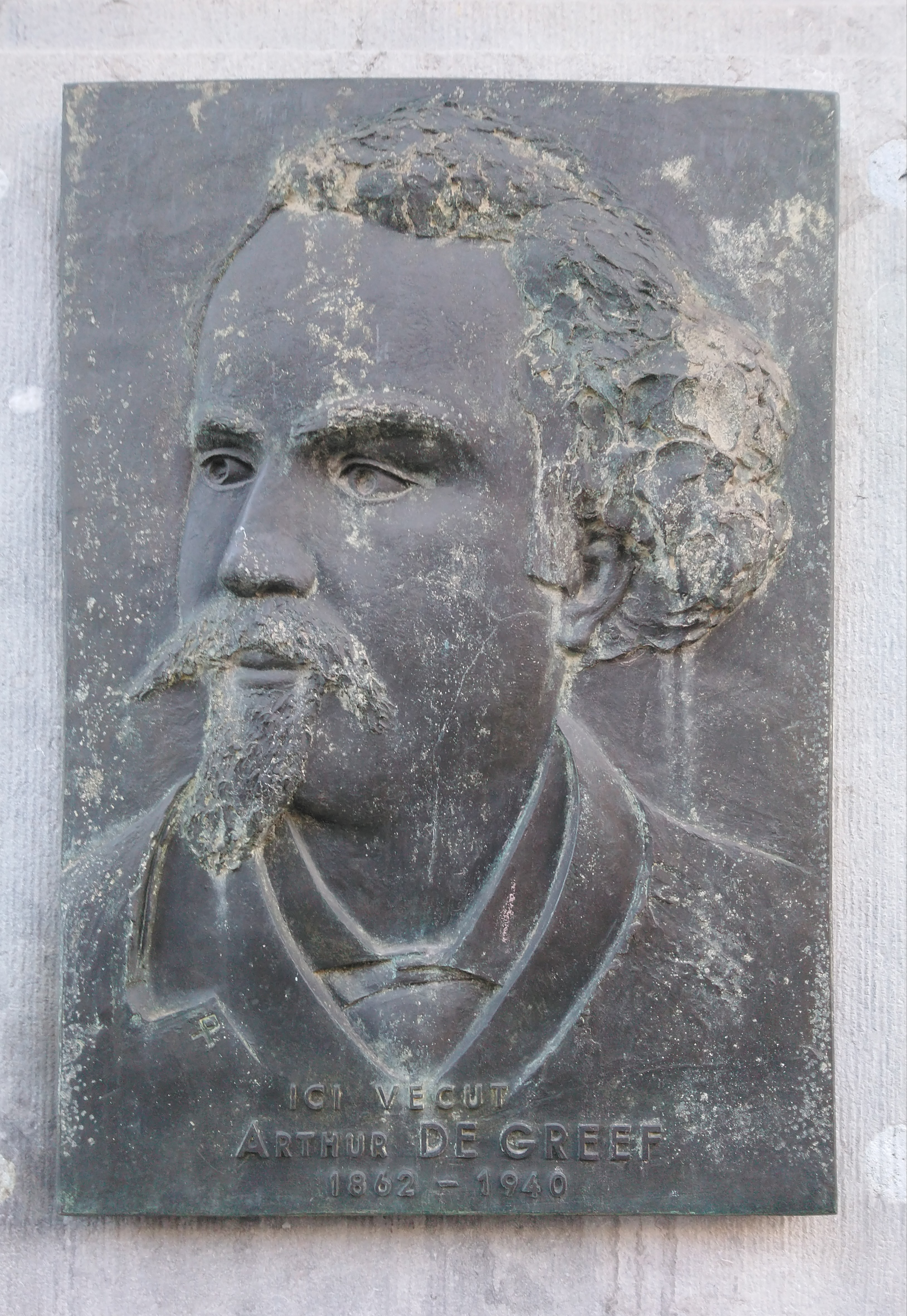
Memorial plaque of Arthur De Greef in Brussels

- 1919: Commander of the Order of the Crown.

== Selected compositions ==
=== Orchestral ===
- The Marketeeress (1878)
- Slanting rays of the sun (1913)
- Humoresque (1928)
- Italian Suite
- Suite for Orchestra in G (sometimes referred to as Flemish Suite)
- Autumn Impressions
- Four Flemish songs with accompaniment of Vielles
- Ballade in Form von Variationen über ein flämisches Volkslied (Ik zag Cecilia komen)

=== Concertante works ===
- Fantasy on Flemish Folk Songs for Piano and Orchestra, Op. 3 (1892)
- Concerto for Piano and Orchestra No. 1 in C minor (1914)
- Concerto for Piano and Orchestra No. 2 in B minor (1930)
- Cinq chants d'amour, for Soprano and Orchestra
- Piano Concertino (Concerto pour piano et petit orchestre)

=== Chamber music ===
- Quatre pièces caractéristiques pour violon et piano (ca. 1883).
- Sonata No. 1 in D for violin and piano (1896)
- Sonata No. 2 in C for violin and piano
- Six New Concert Studies
- Trio in F for violin, cello, and piano (1935)

=== Piano ===
- Coucher de Soleil
- Slanting rays of the sun (1913; Orchestrated version exists)
- Five études in concert form (Cinq études de concert) (1914–1918)
- Sonata in C minor for 2 Pianos (1928; 2 pianos)
- Valse-caprice (2 Pianos)

== Recordings ==
=== As performer ===
His was the first complete recording of Grieg's Piano Concerto in A minor, but he had earlier recorded a cut version. He also recorded with Isolde Menges.

Other recorded works included:

Liszt:

- Concertos Nos. 1 & 2

Chopin

- Piano Sonata No. 2 in B-flat minor, Op 35
- Waltz No. 1 in E-flat, Op. 18
- Waltz No. 5 in A-flat, Op. 42
- Waltz No. 6 in D-flat, Op. 64, No. 1
- Waltz No. 11 in G-flat, Op. 70, No. 1

Schubert

- Soirée de Vienne No. 6, arr. Liszt

Moszkowski

- Serenata in D, Op. 15, No. 1
- Etude in G, Op. 18, No. 3
- Waltz in E, Op. 34

Saint-Saëns

- Piano Concerto in G minor, Op. 22 (with the New Symphony Orchestra of London and Landon Ronald)

A complete discography can be found at Earthlink here.

=== As composer ===
- Arthur De Greef: Piano Concertos Nos. 1 and 2 - André De Groote (piano), Moscow Symphony Orchestra, Dir. Frédéric Devreese, released by Naxos in 1995 and Marco Polo in 1996
- Flemish Connection V: Arthur De Greef - Orchestral Works - Artur Pizarro (piano), Charlotte Riedijk (soprano), Flemish Radio Orchestra, dir. Yannick Nézet-Séguin, released by Et'Cetera in 2005
