= Aloïs Boudry =

Belgian painter

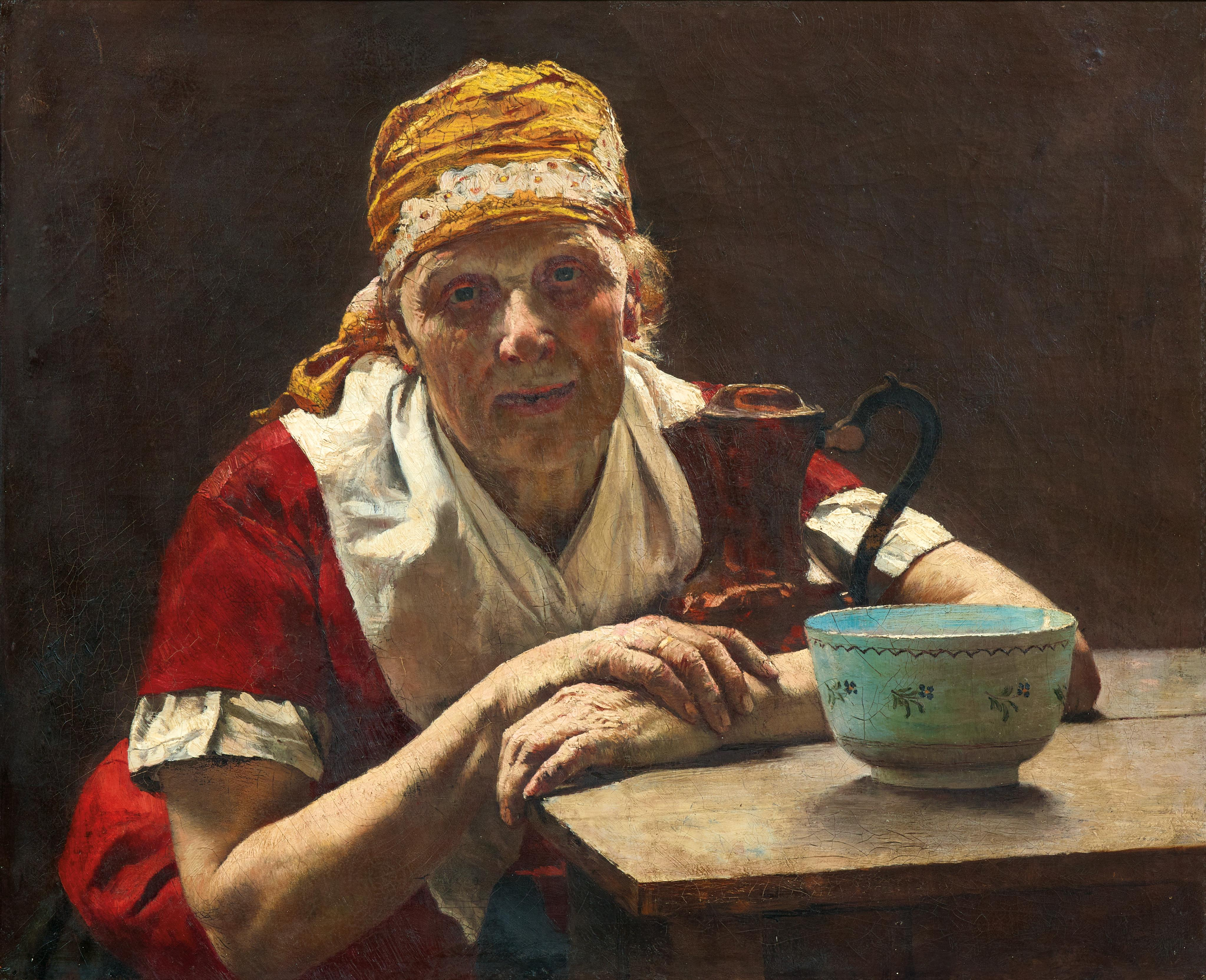
Rest

Aloïs Boudry (12 August 1851, Ypres – 27 November 1938, Antwerp) was a Belgian painter known for his portraits, still lifes and interiors.

== Life ==
He first studied at the art schools in Ypres and Roeselare and completed his training at the Royal Academy of Fine Arts (Antwerp), where his teachers were Nicaise De Keyser and Jozef Van Lerius.

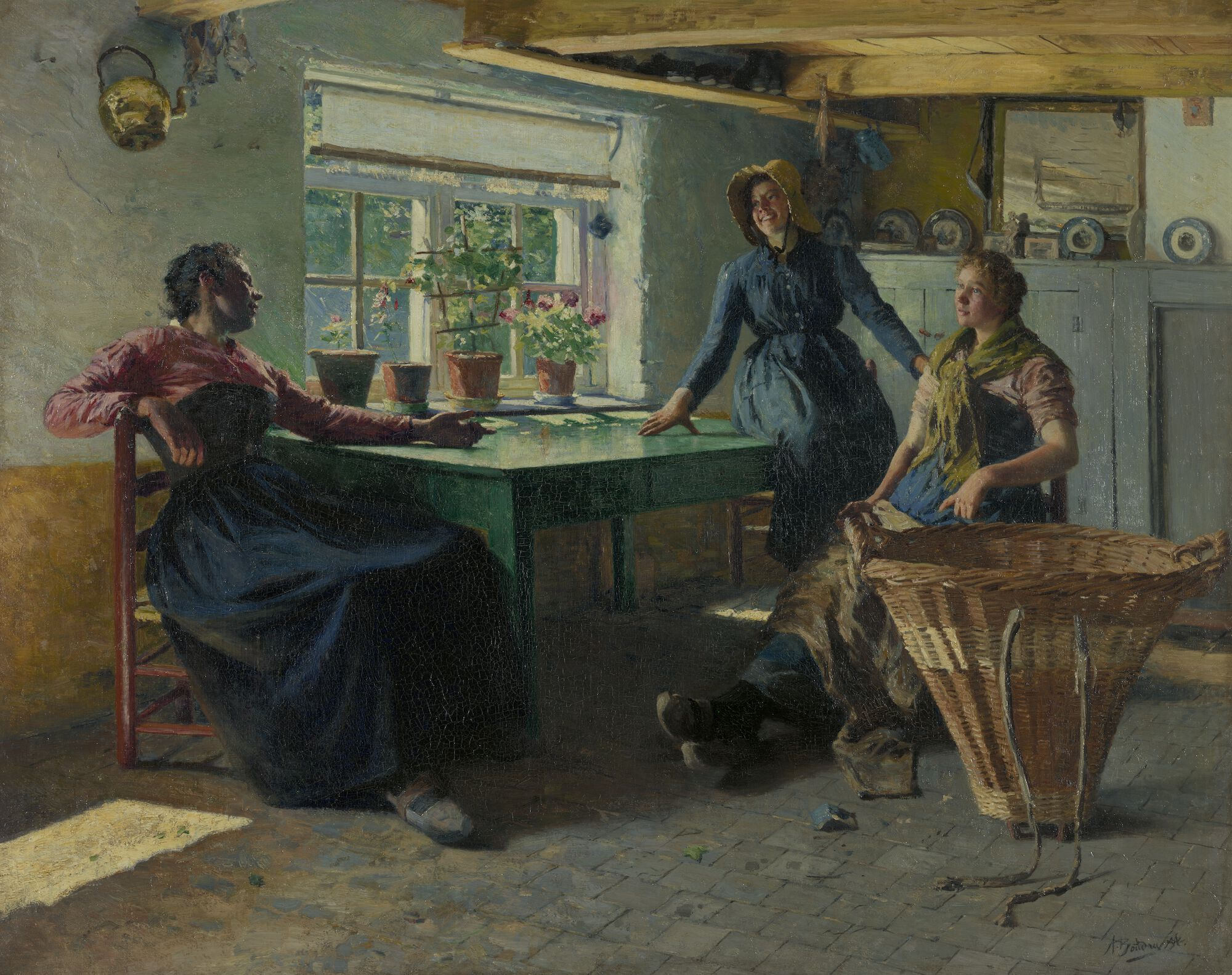
Interior with fisherwomen

In 1885, he joined "Als ik Kan" (If I Can), an association of visual artists devoted to preserving traditional methods. He participated in the exposition "Brussels International 1910", where he won a silver medal. When the seaside resort of Knokke-Heist began a promotional campaign in 1913, he designed the posters, which became well known.

At the outbreak of World War I, he fled to England and established himself as a portraitist. In 1917, he moved to Italy to await the end of the war, then returned to Belgium.

Wherever he was, he sought out humble people as the subjects for his paintings. His depictions of the fisherman of Nieuwpoort are especially popular. Many of them can be seen at the National Fishery Museum in Oostduinkerke.

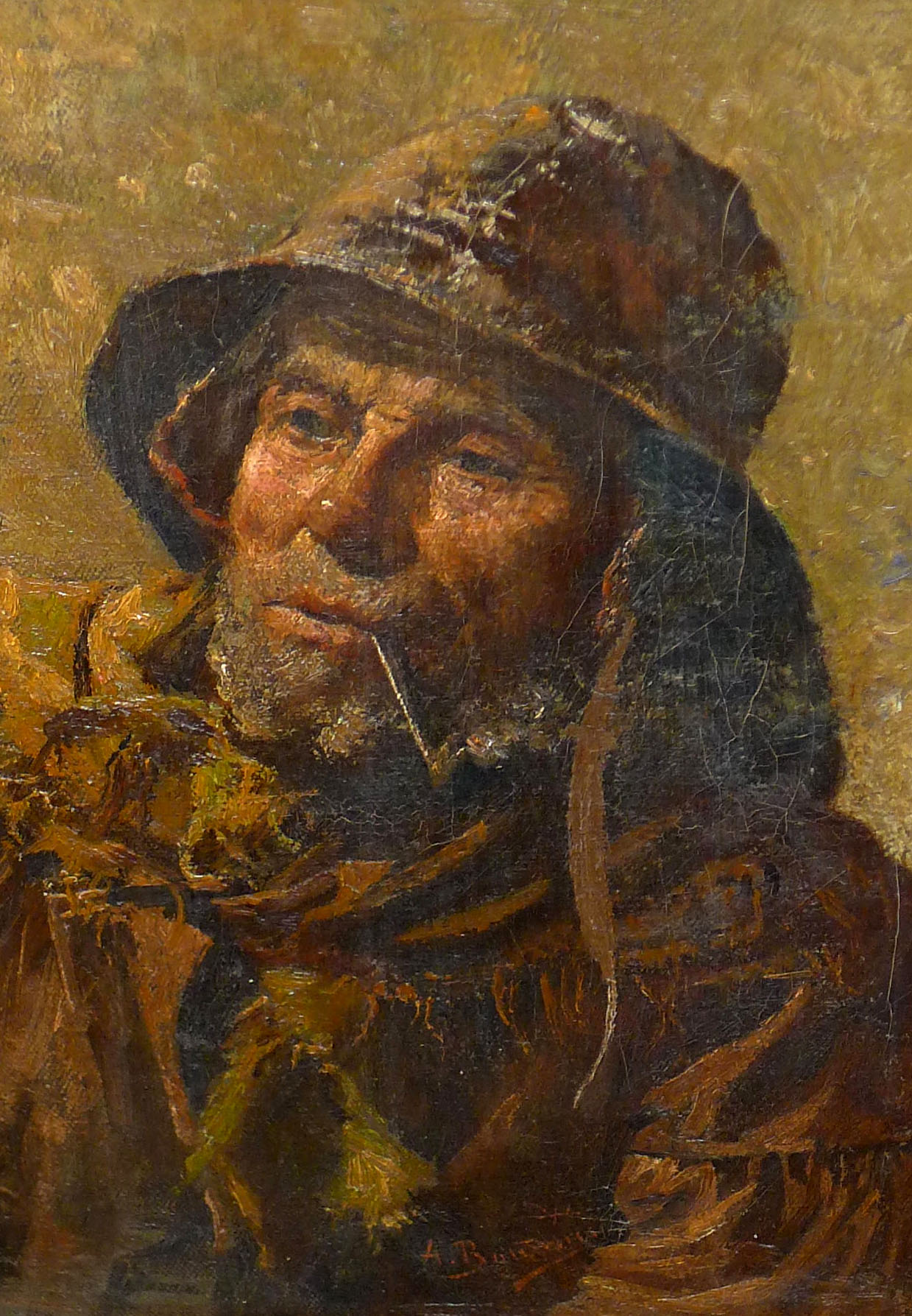
Portrait of a fisherman

His son, Robert (1872-1961), was also a painter, as was his grandson Paul (1913-1976). His great-granddaughter, Nele, is currently a painter in Ghent.
