= Giovanni Velluti (pianist) =

Italian pianist

Giovanni Velluti is an Italian pianist, accompanist, and teacher. He studied with Aldo Mantia and Rodolfo Caporali. Since 1993 he is the regular accompanist of Katia Ricciarelli. He teaches at Santa Cecilia Conservatory in Rome.

He specializes in repertoire of the Romantic era, notably the works of Liszt and Chopin and is also a keen interpreter of Moszkowski, Carl Tausig, Henselt, Grainger, Schulz-Evler and other less frequently performed fin du siècle virtuoso works. Velluti has performed in the most important Italian concert halls and abroad and with many singers among whom are Daniela Barcellona, Andrea Bocelli, Gianfranco Cecchele, Kristian Johansson, Carlo Lepore, Marco Vinco.
