= Jozef Van Lerius =

Belgian painter

Jozef Van Lerius'
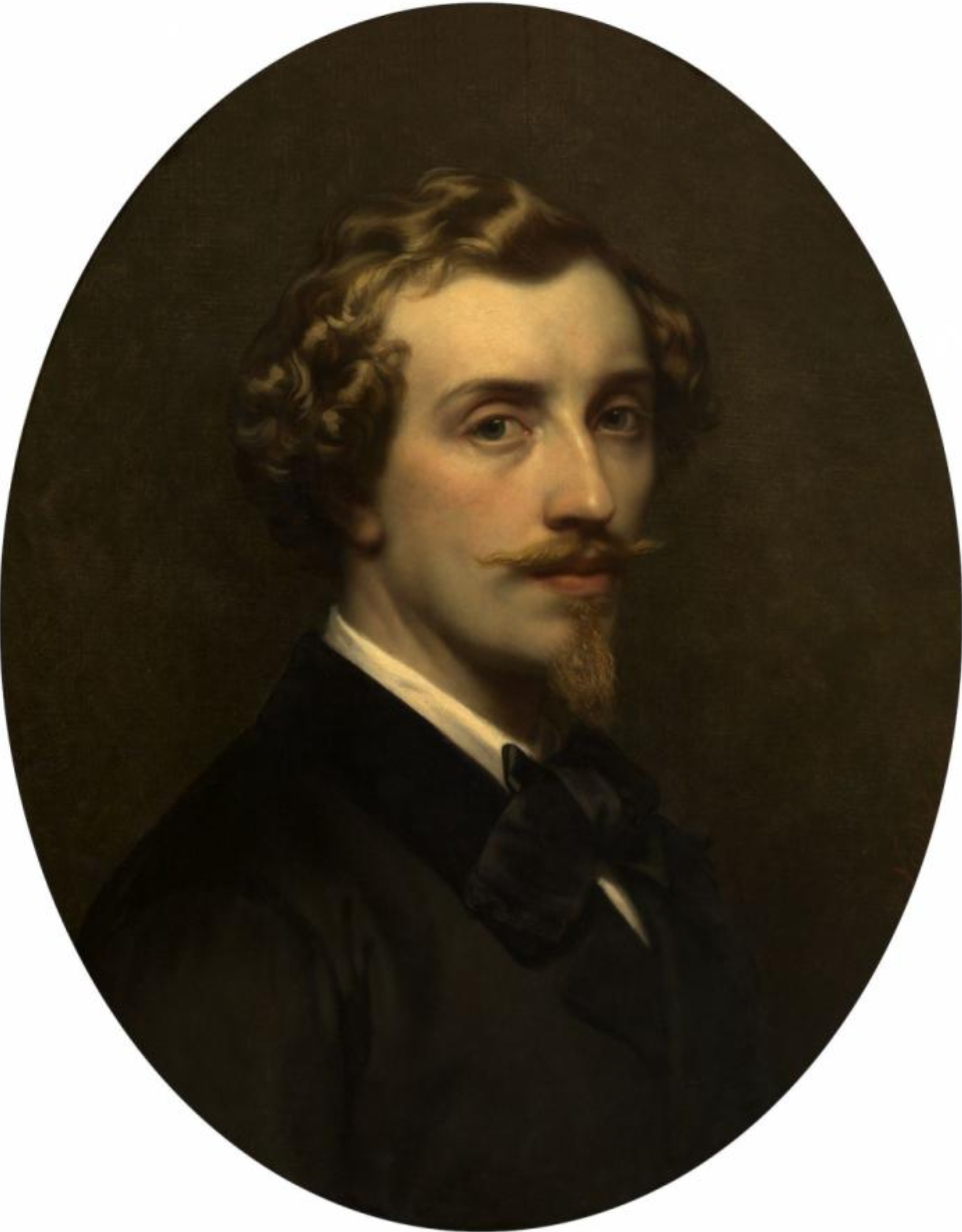
- Self-portrait (1852)
- Born: Joseph Henri François Van Lerius'; 23 December 1823; Boom, Antwerp, Belgium
- Died: 29 February 1876 (aged 52); Mechelen, Belgium
- Education: Royal Academy of Fine Arts of Antwerp
- Occupation: Painter

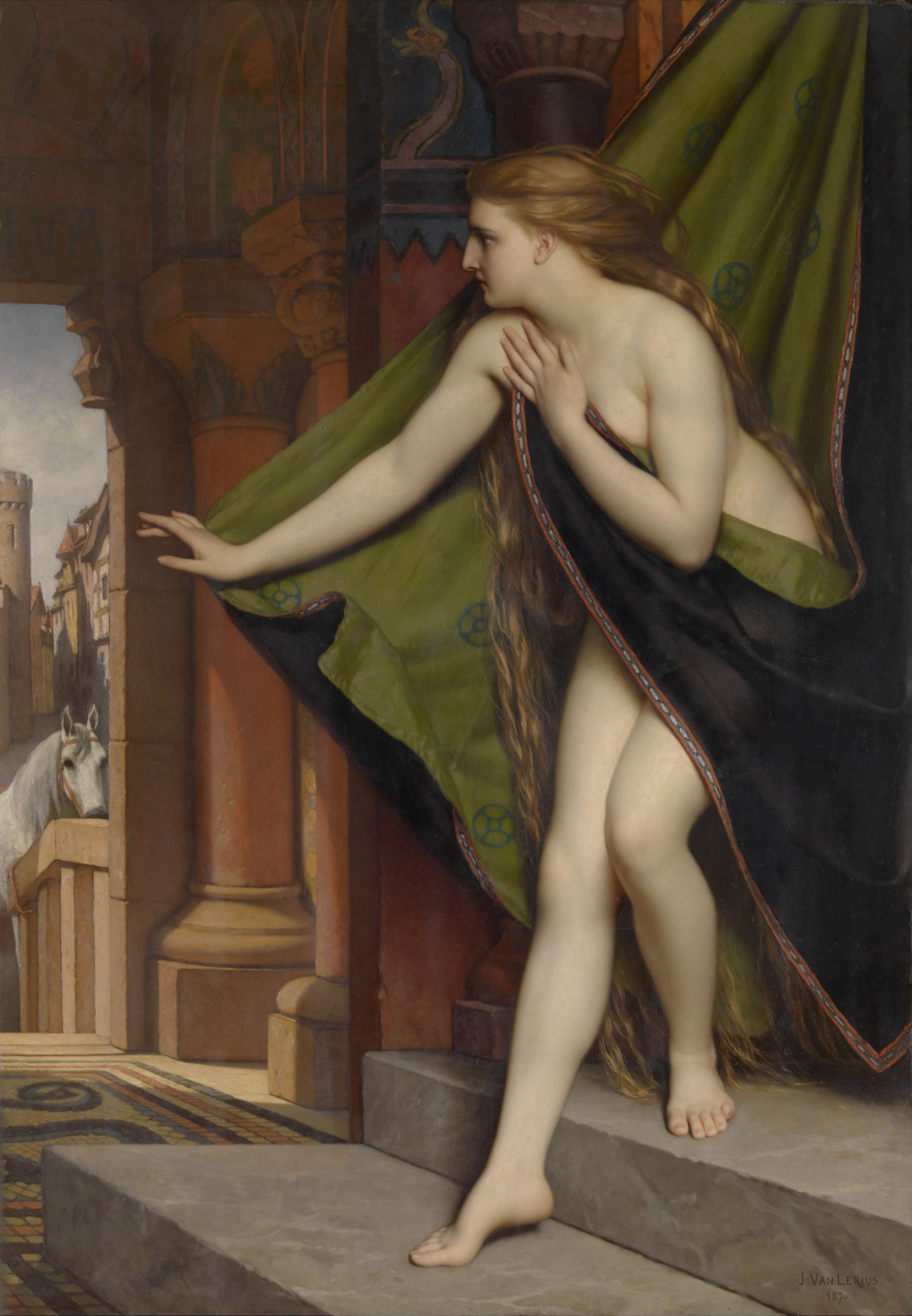
Lady Godiva

Joseph Henri François Van Lerius (23 December 1823, Boom, Antwerp – 29 February 1876, Mechelen) was a Belgian painter in the Romantic-Historical style.

== Life ==
Van Lerius was born in Boom, Antwerp, on 23 November 1823. In 1838, he was already an apprentice draftsman at the Académie Royale des Beaux-Arts in Brussels. From 1839 to 1844, he was a student of Gustave Wappers. He took a study trip through Germany and Italy in 1852. Two years later, he was appointed to a position as a painting instructor at the Royal Academy of Fine Arts of Antwerp. His notable students included Lawrence Alma-Tadema, Aloïs Boudry, Gerard Portielje, Henri Van Dyck and Piet Verhaert.

In 1861, he was awarded the Knight's Cross of the Order of Leopold and in 1869 became a Knight in the Order of St.Michael.

In 1875, he was diagnosed with meningitis. The following year, he died in Mechelen, where he had gone for treatment.

== Work ==
Van Lerius painted mythological and biblical scenes as well as portraits and genre pictures. Much of his work is didactic in nature.

In 1852 Queen Victoria bought his painting "Premier Né" (First Born), depicting a young couple with a baby. It is still on display at Windsor Castle. Perhaps his best-known work is "Lady Godiva", which was shown at the Antwerp Triennial Salon in 1870. It was purchased by London art dealer Henry Graves. Other paintings found their way to San Francisco and St. Petersburg. His "Cinderella and Her Sisters" oil painting was gifted to the Chillicothe & Ross County Public Library in 1909 by Mr. and Mrs. A. L. Fullerton. The painting remains on display in the reference room at the Chillicothe & Ross County Public Library in Chillicothe, Ohio to this day.

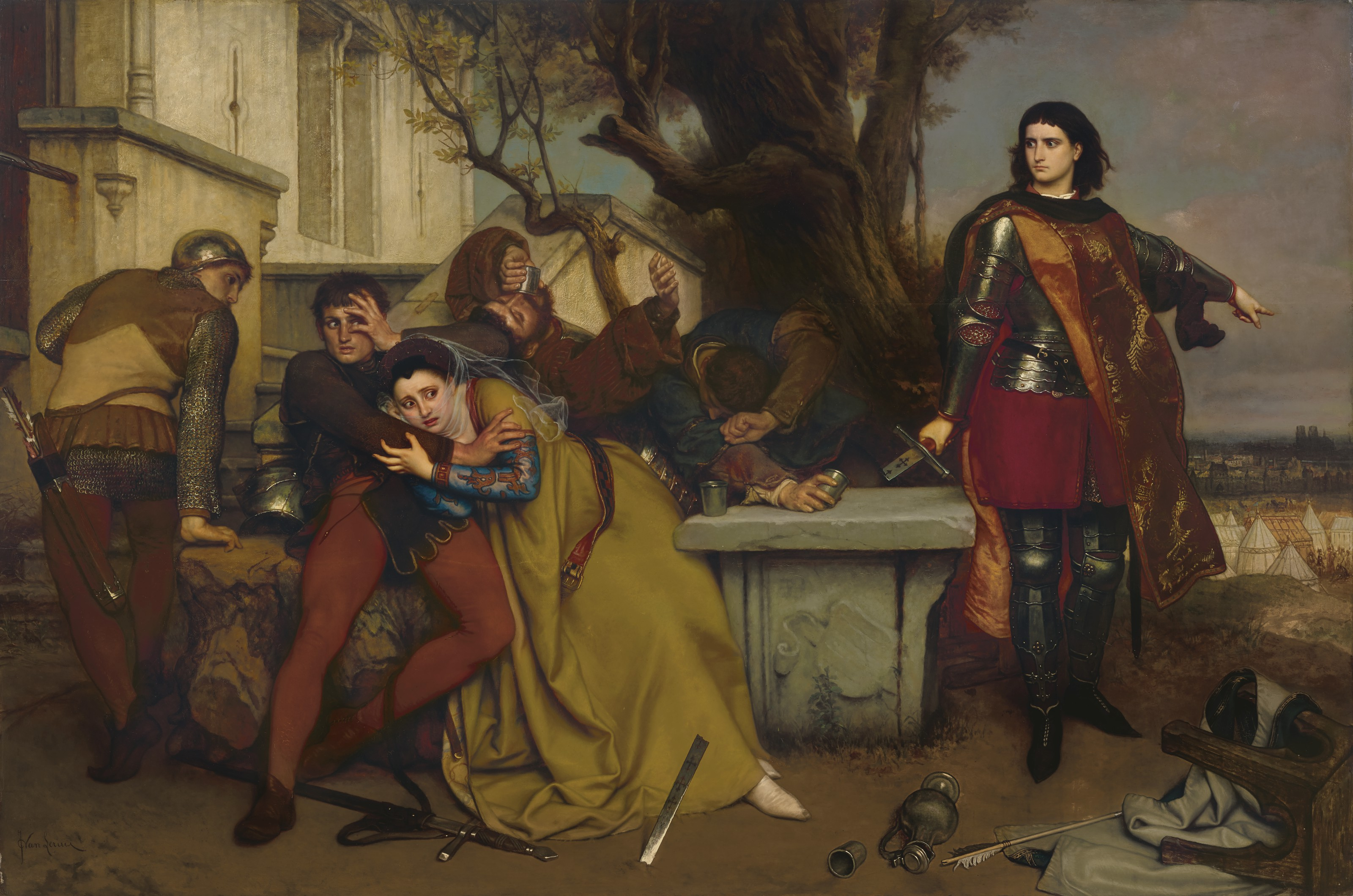
Jeanne d'Arc au siège de Paris

Princess Herminie de Looz et Corswarem

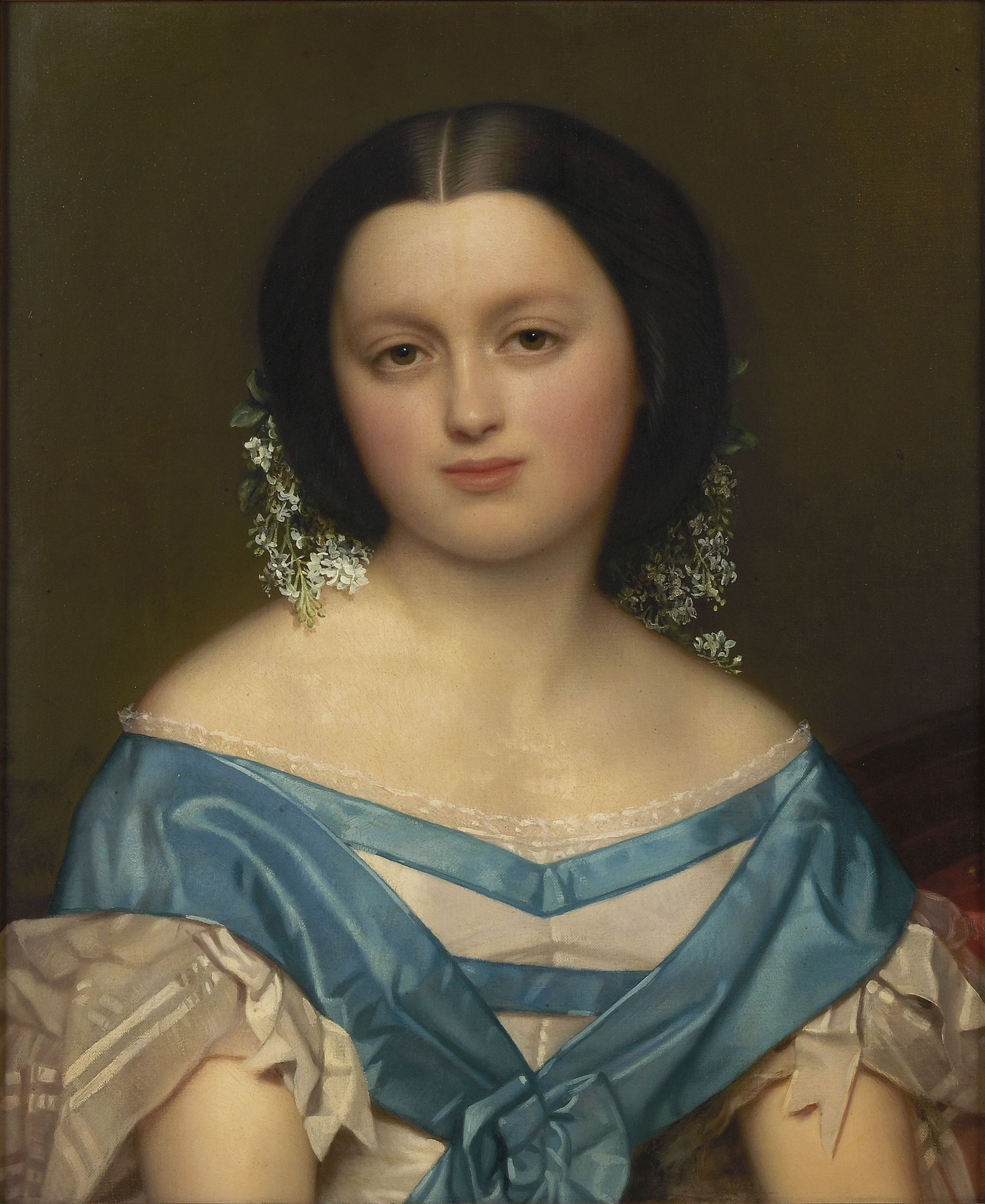
Portrait of Henriette Mayer van den Bergh (1857)

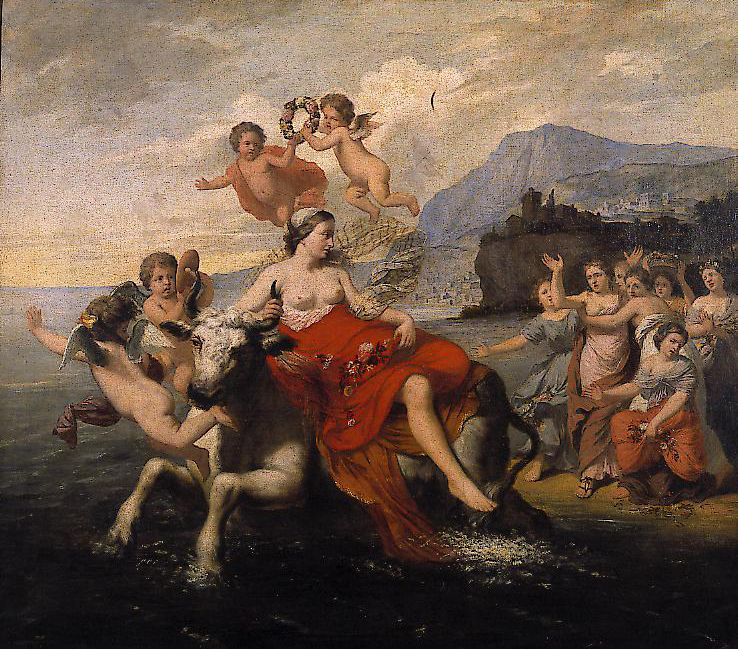

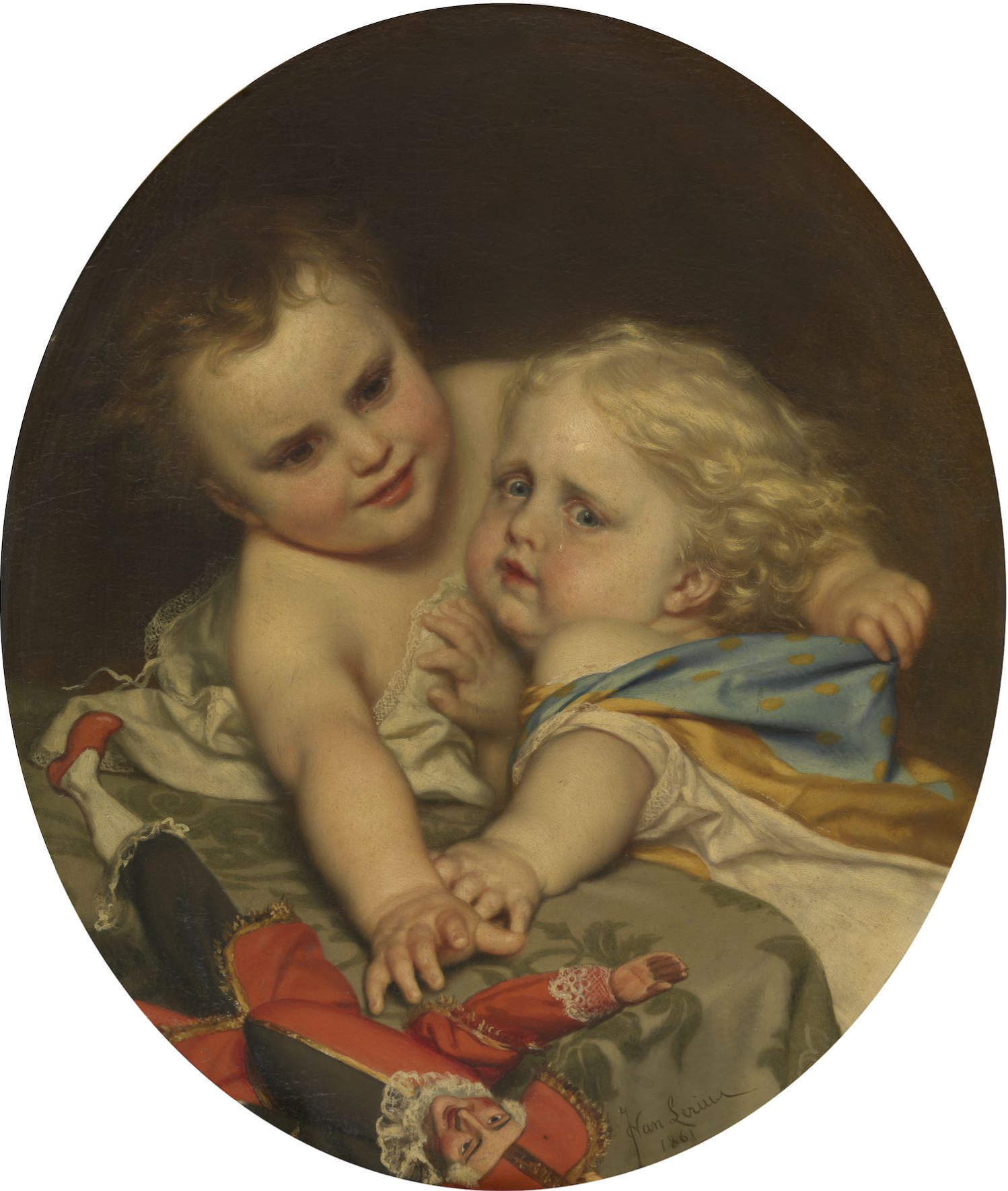
Two Children Playing Around (1861)

Madame LeDelier (1854)

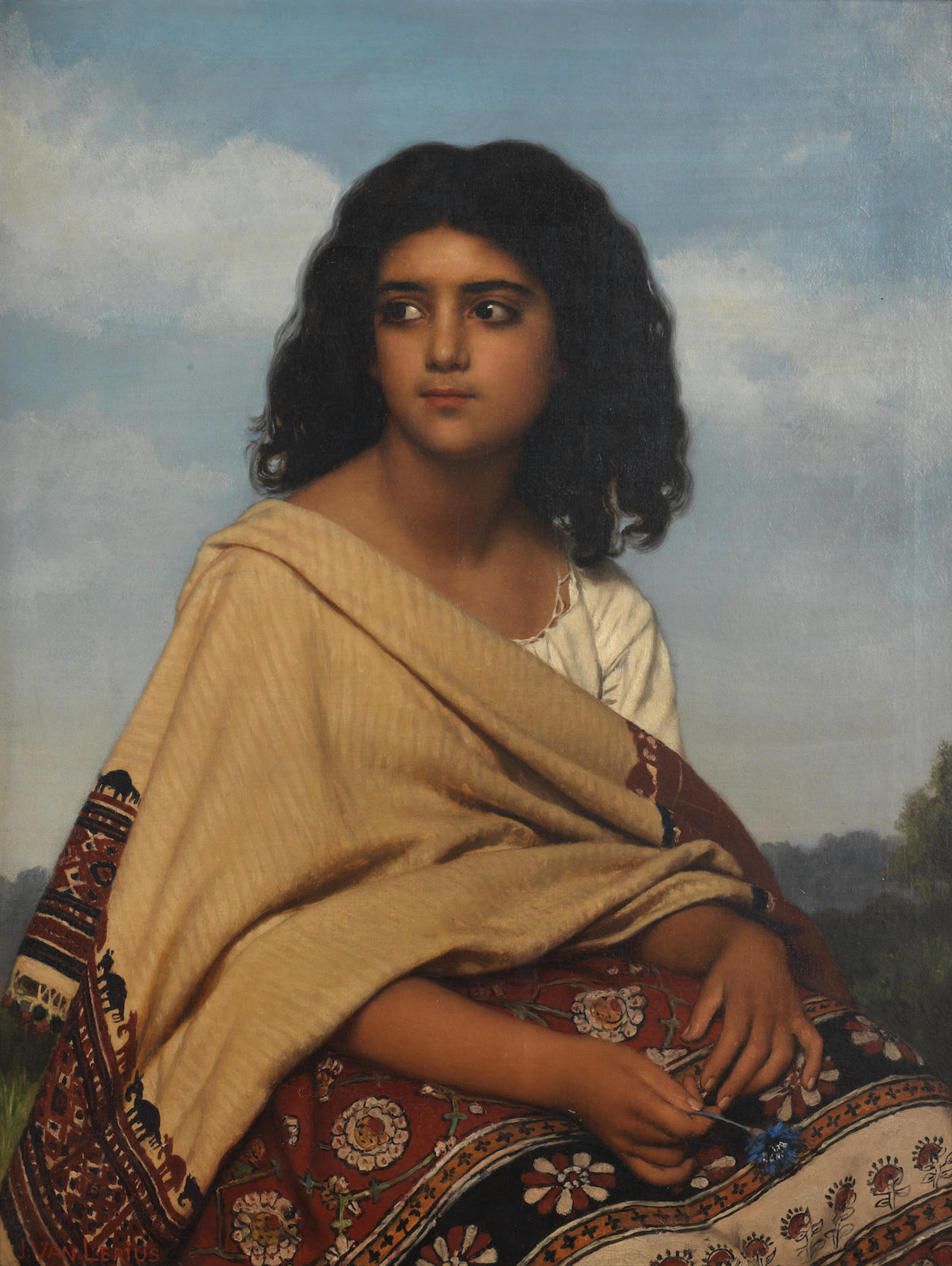
Moza, the Gypsy woman (1880)

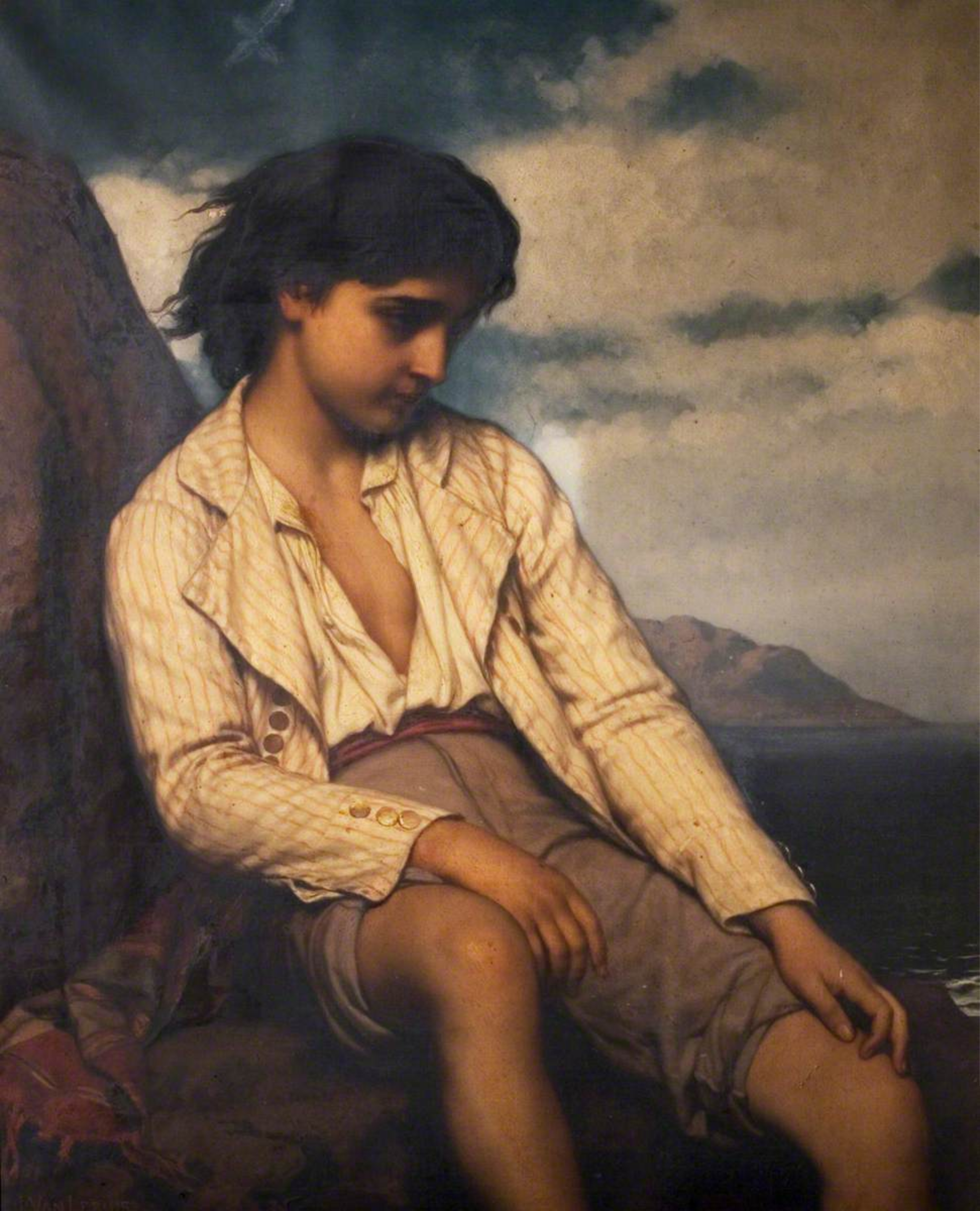

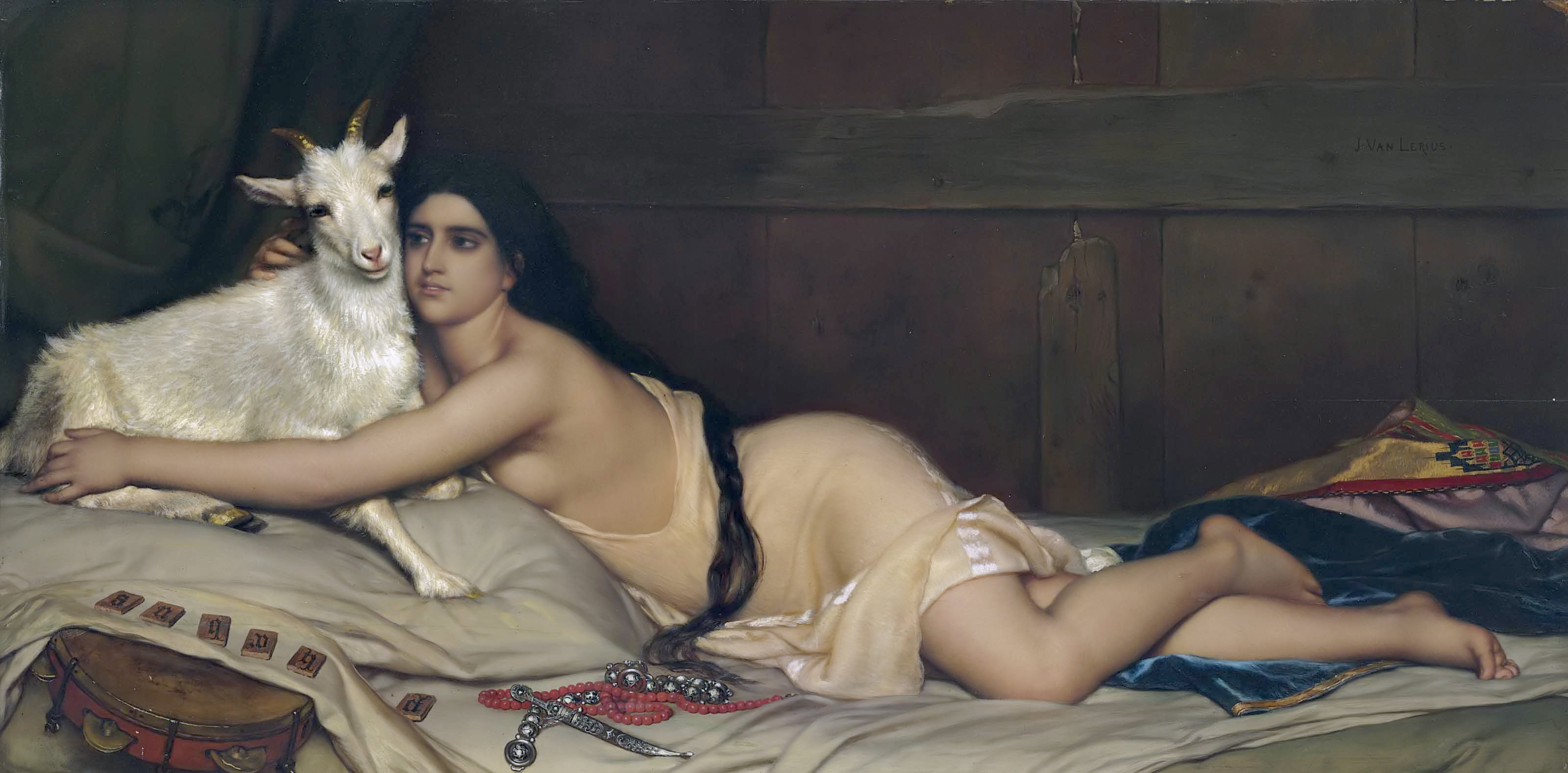
Esmeralda and Djali

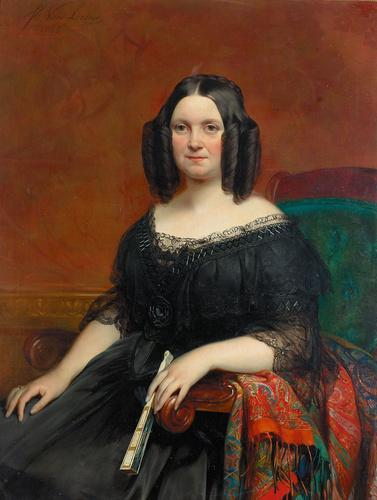

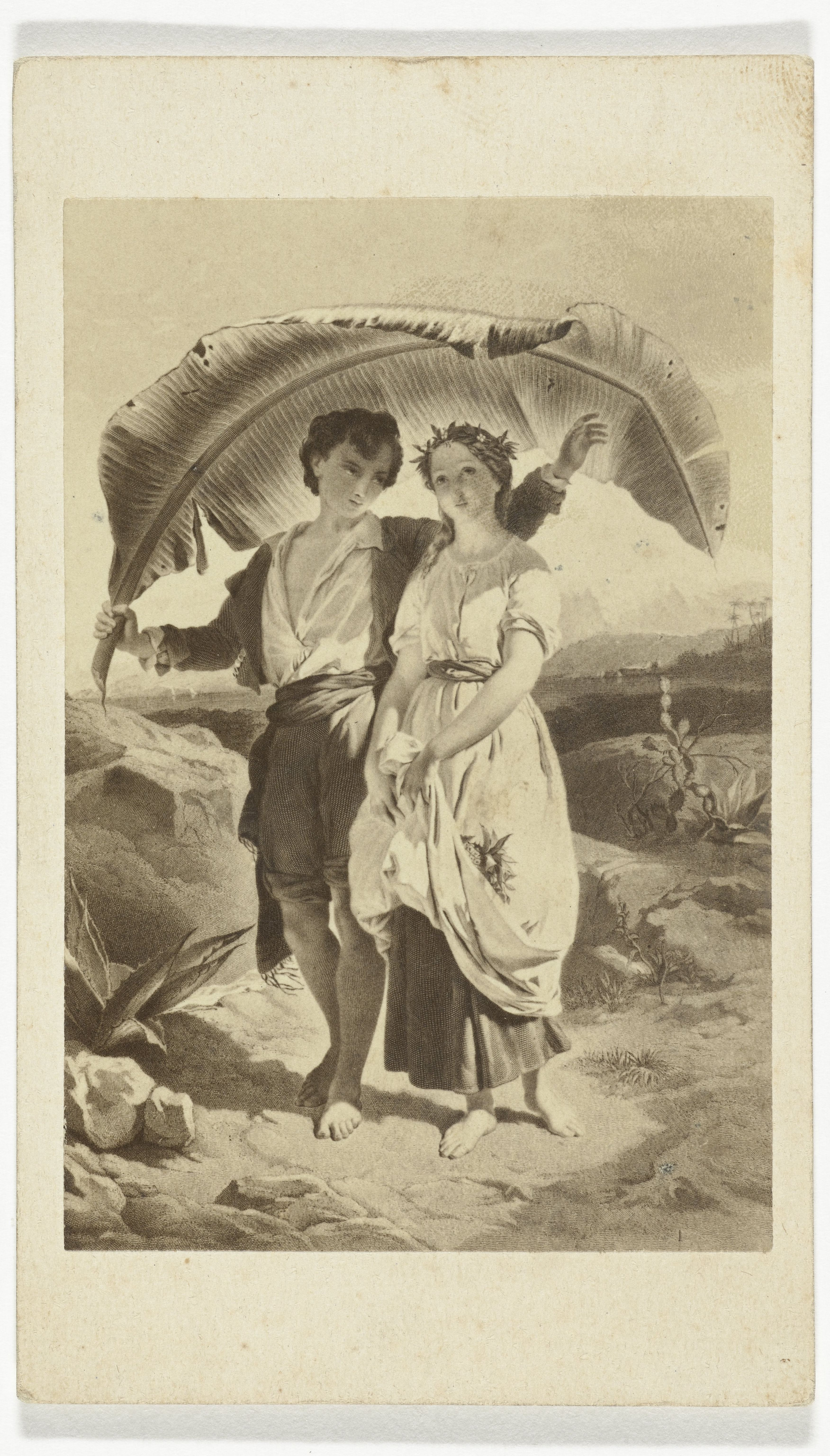

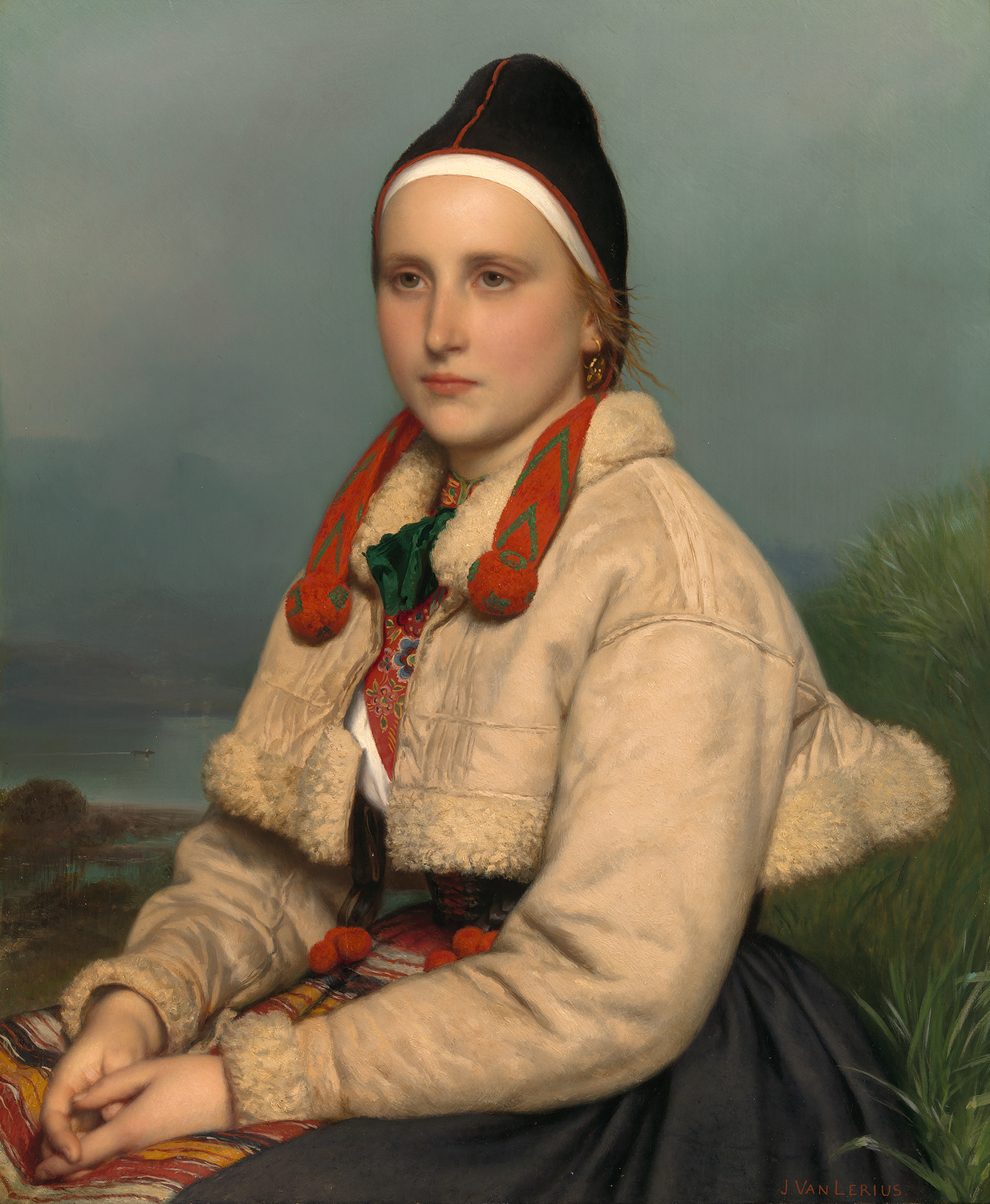
Girl from Dalarne (1843-1876)

Madame Valentine De Give-LeDelier as a Child (1859)

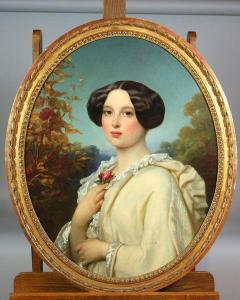
Portrait de jeune fille (1856)

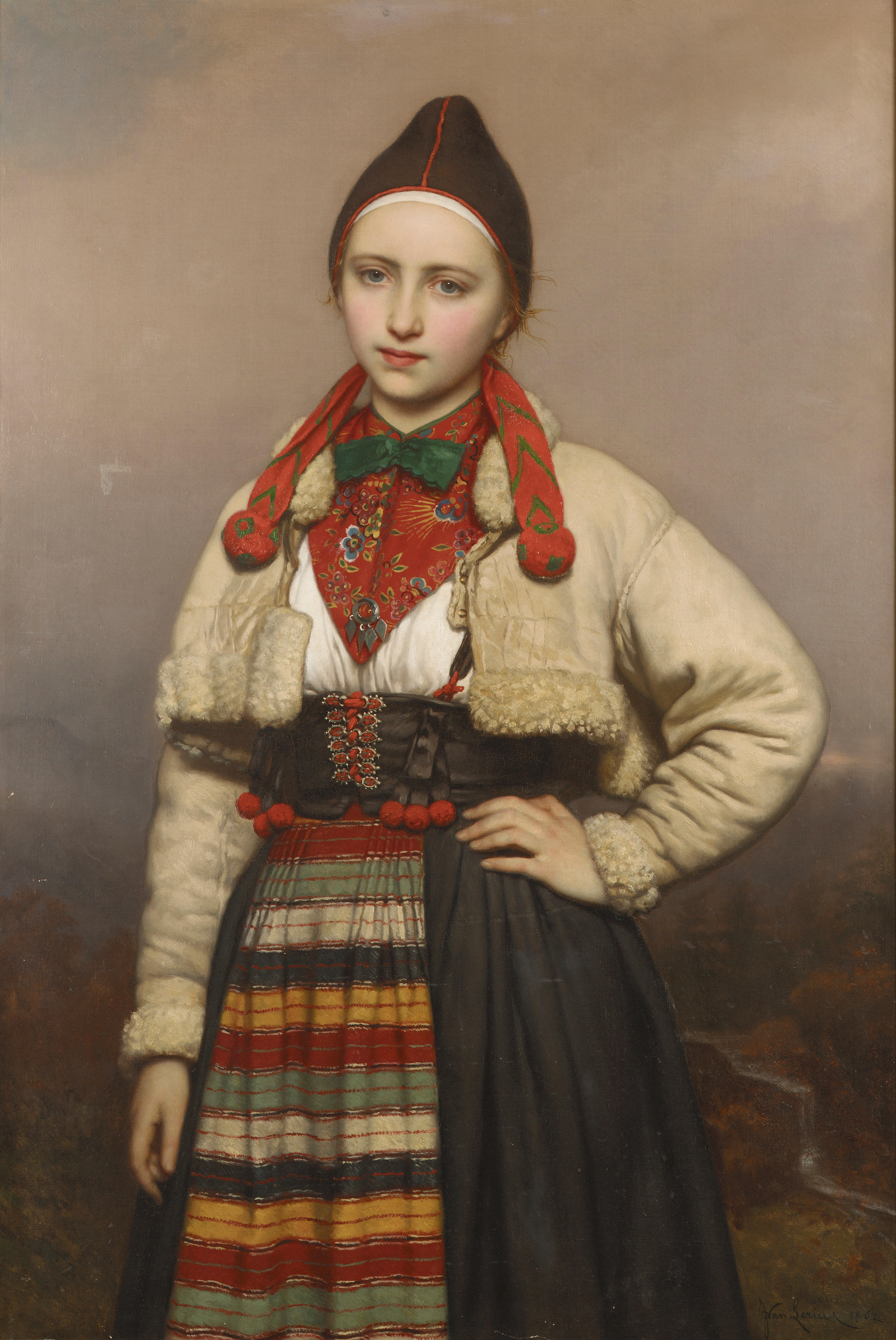
Jeune fille de la paroisse de Rattvik dans Dalarne, Suède (1862)

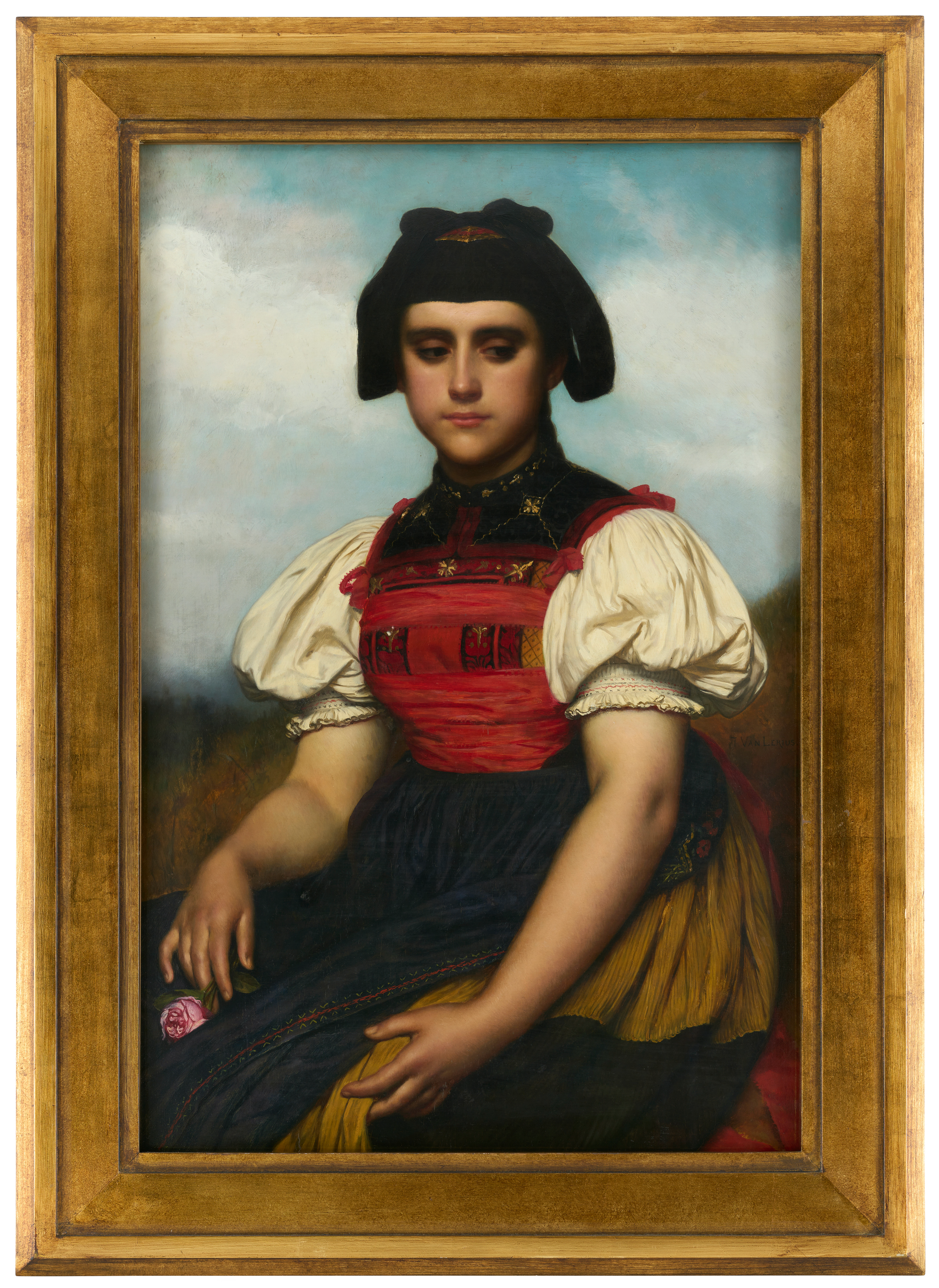
Young Girl from the Hotzenwald (1852)

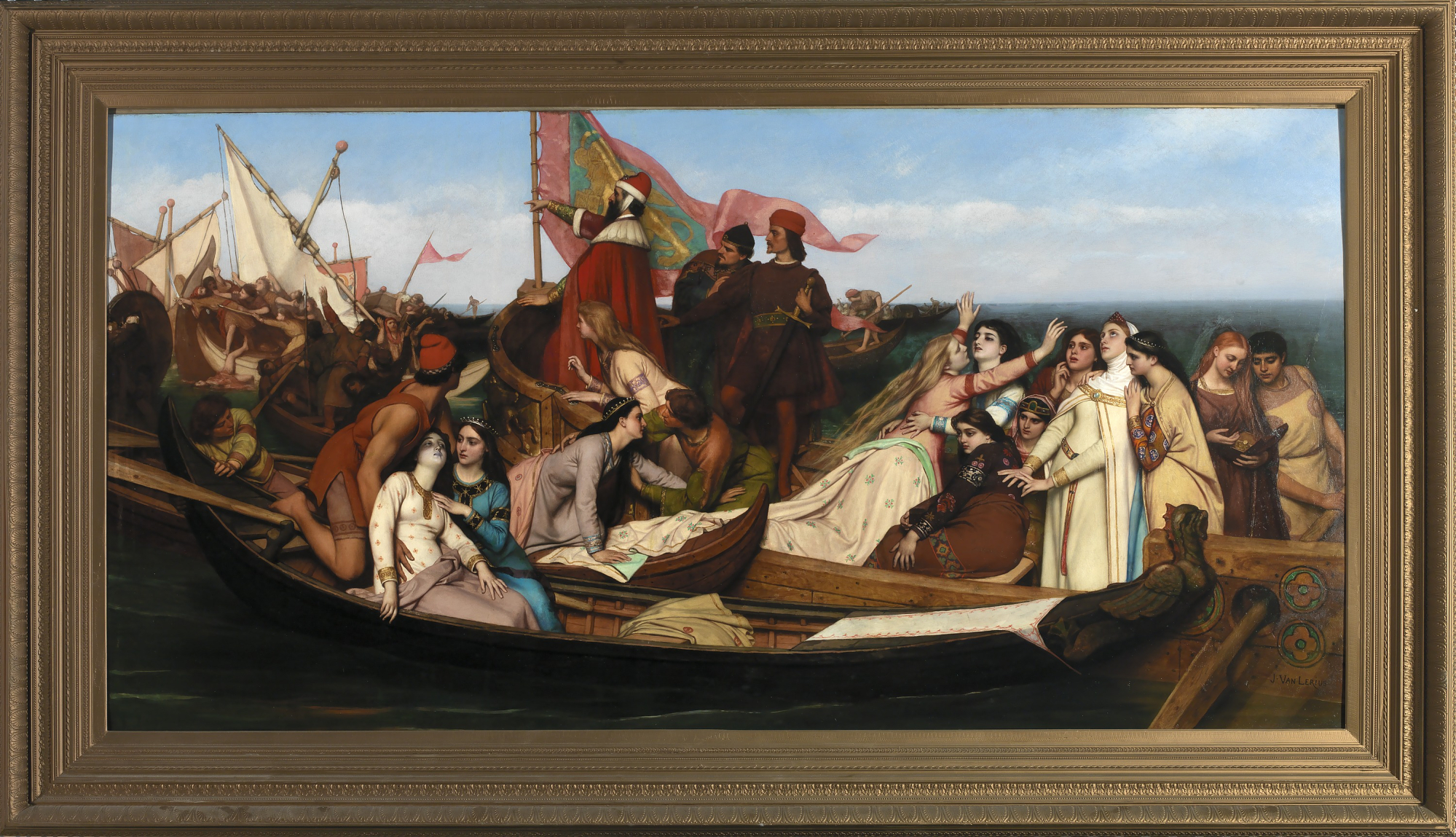
Brides of Venice (1871)

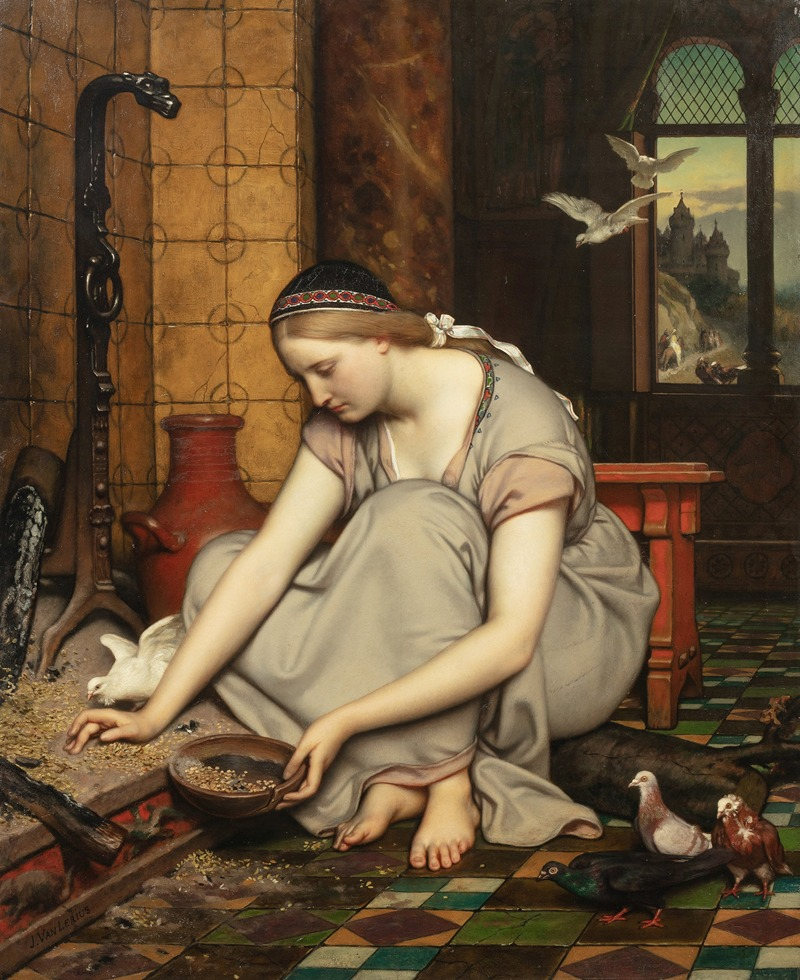
Cinderella

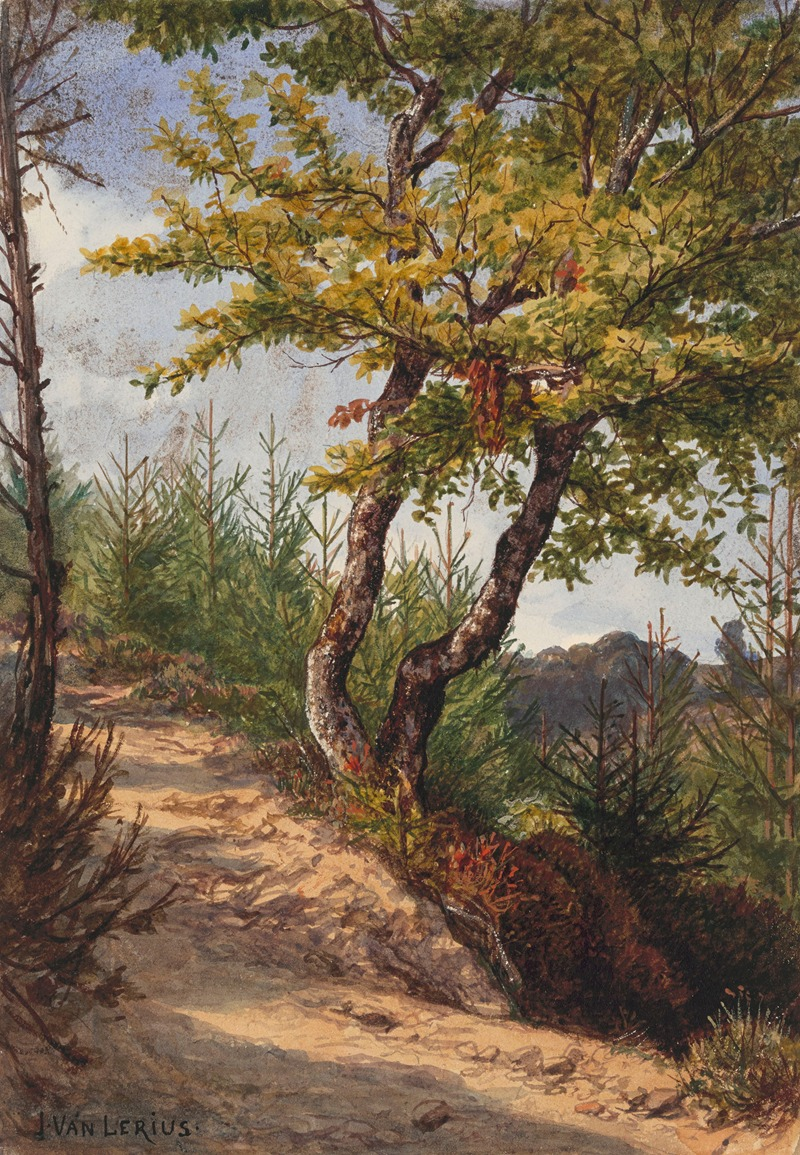
Schwalbach Nassau (1868)

== See also ==
- Felix Moscheles

== Sources ==
- Biographie Nationale de Belgique, Vol.IX.
- A. Brokken, I. Machielsen and B. Fornari, Femme fatale tussen liefde & dood (exhibition catalog), Sint-Niklaas, 1992.
