= Brussels International Exposition (1910) =

World's fair in Brussels, Belgium

1910 Brussels
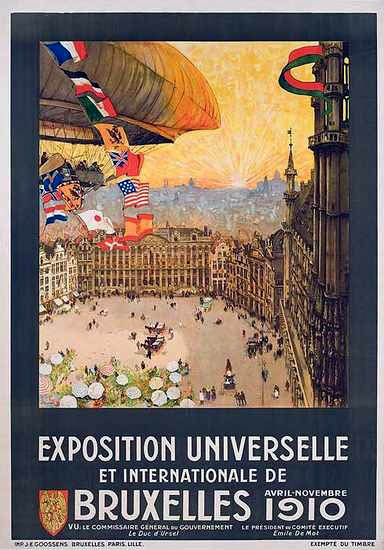
- Poster for the 1910 Brussels World's Fair

Overview
- BIE-class: Universal exposition
- Category: Historical Expo
- Name: Exposition universelle et internationale de Bruxelles
- Area: 88 hectares (220 acres)
- Visitors: 13,000,000

Participant(s)
- Countries: 26

Location
- Country: Belgium
- City: Brussels
- Venue: Solbosch/Solbos; Cinquantenaire/Jubelpark; Tervuren
- Coordinates: 50°48′46.4″N 4°22′49.8″E

Timeline
- Opening: 23 April 1910
- Closure: 7 November 1910

Universal expositions
- Previous: Milan International (1906) in Milan
- Next: Esposizione internazionale dell'industria e del lavoro in Turin

The Brussels International Exposition (French: Exposition universelle et internationale de Bruxelles; Dutch: Wereldtentoonstelling van Brussel) of 1910 was a world's fair held in Brussels, Belgium, from 23 April to 7 November 1910. This was just thirteen years after Brussels' previous world's fair. It received 13 million visitors, covered 88 hectares (220 acres) and lost 100,000 Belgian francs.

== Location ==
The grounds and buildings were partly located around the Solbosch/Solbos district (in the City of Brussels' southern extension), and partly in the Parc du Cinquantenaire/Jubelpark (a remainder of the 1897 World's Fair), where the fine art's exhibition took place. The colonial exhibition was hosted in the newly built Palace of the Colonies, today's Royal Museum for Central Africa, in the suburb of Tervuren. Another major site for the exhibition was the Mont des Arts/Kunstberg in central Brussels, although this site was largely demolished during the post-war construction process of Brusselisation.

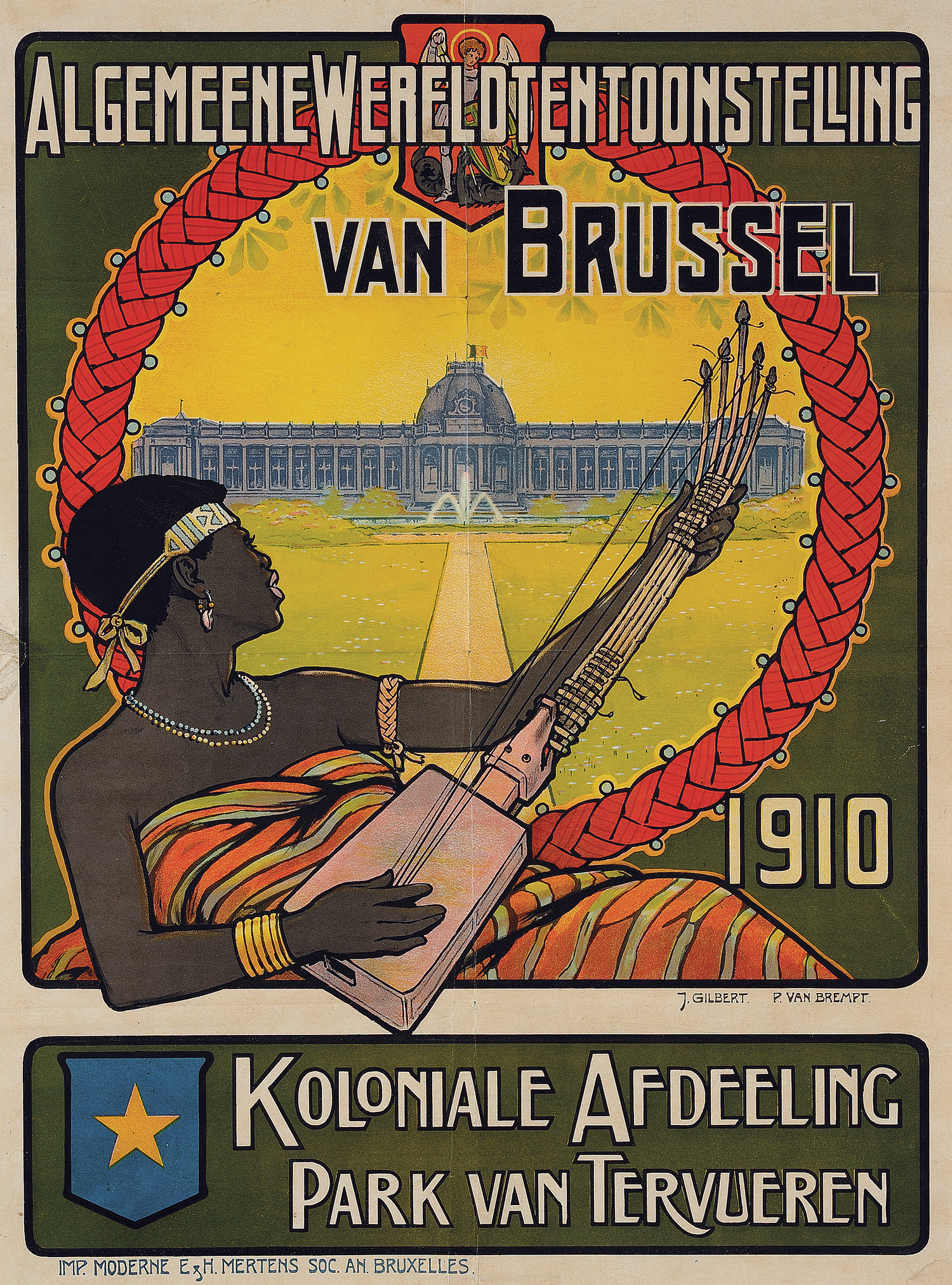
Poster for the colonial section of the Brussels International Exposition of 1910

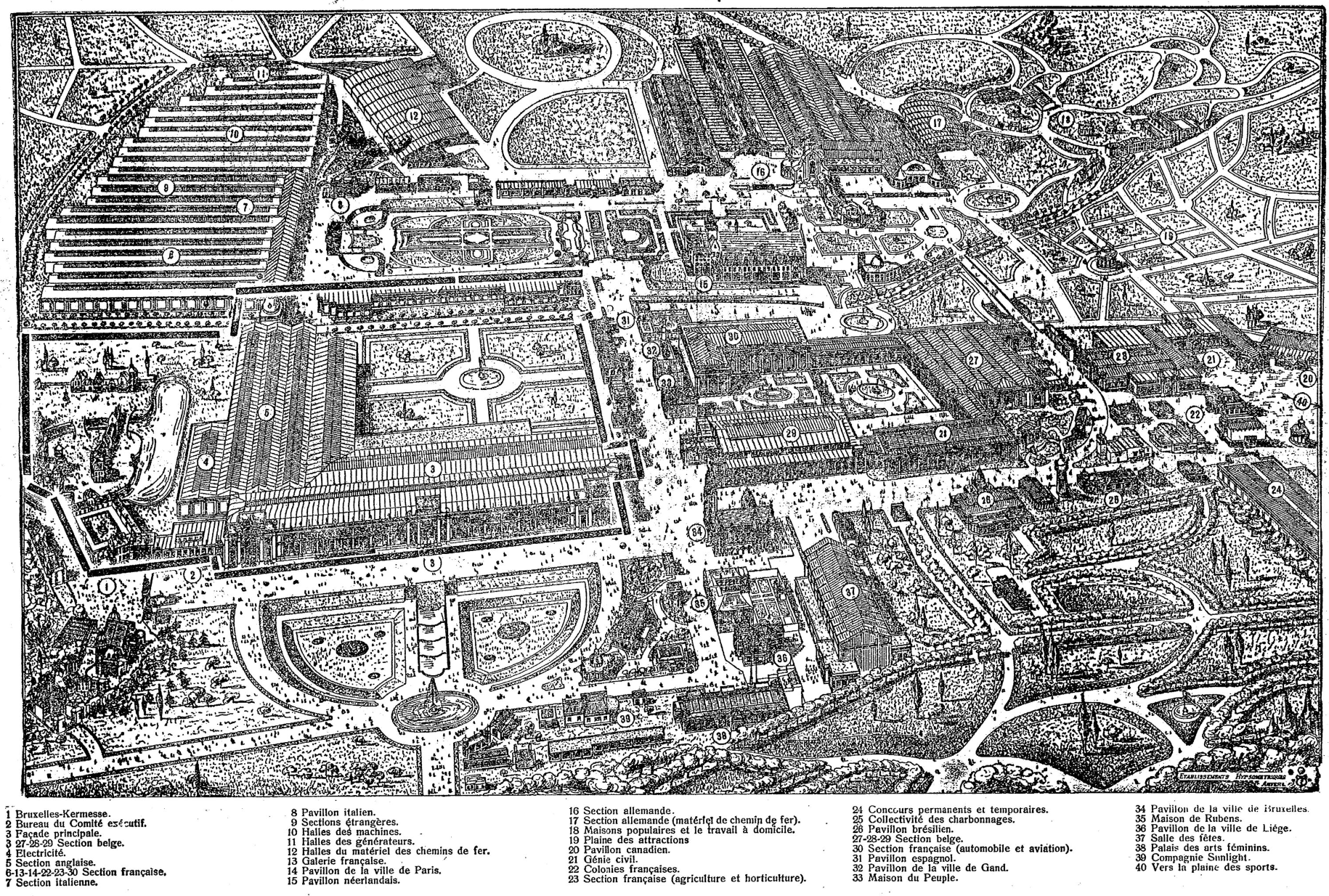
Map of the 1910 World's Fair in the Solbosch/Solbos district of Brussels

== Country participation ==
There were 26 participating countries: Brazil, Canada, China, Denmark, Dominican Republic, France, Germany (whose Attaché des Reichskommissars was Heinrich Albert), Great Britain, Greece, Guatemala, Haiti, Italy, Japan, Luxembourg, Monaco, Netherlands, Nicaragua, Persia, Peru, Russia, Spain, Switzerland, Turkey, United States and Uruguay.

The Dutch and German pavilions displayed the decorative arts and architecture of their home country. The Italian pavilion illustrated the Italian Renaissance. The Belgian pavilion was represented through the cities of Brussels, Ghent, Antwerp and Liège.

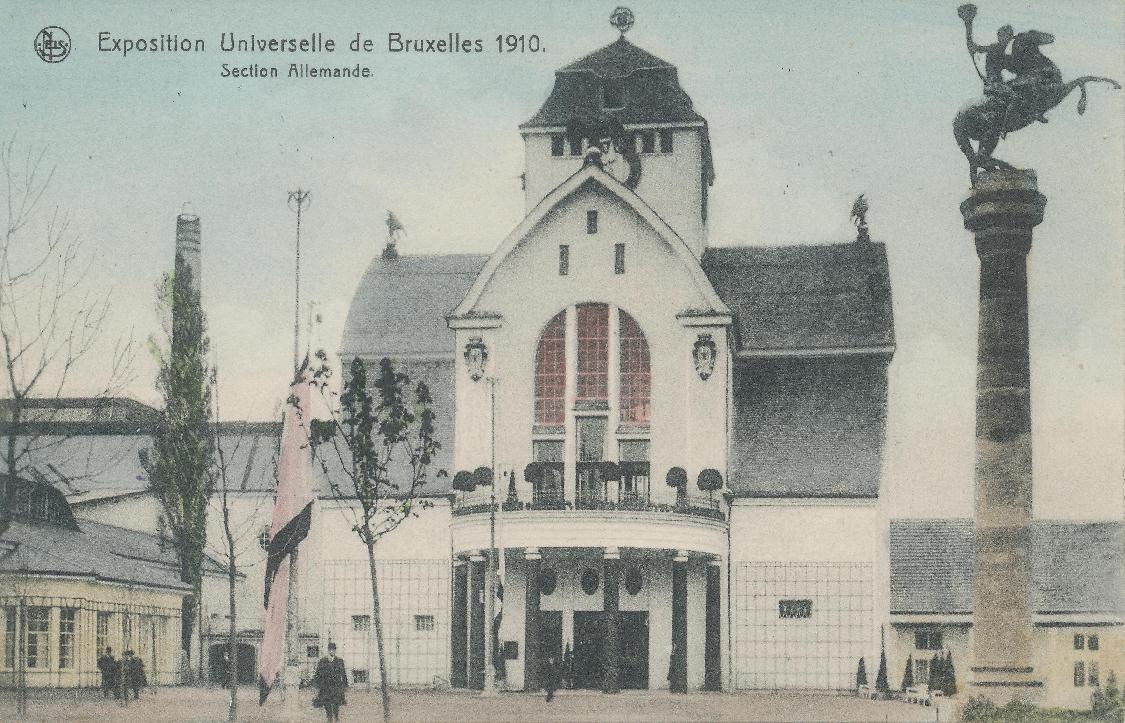
German pavilion

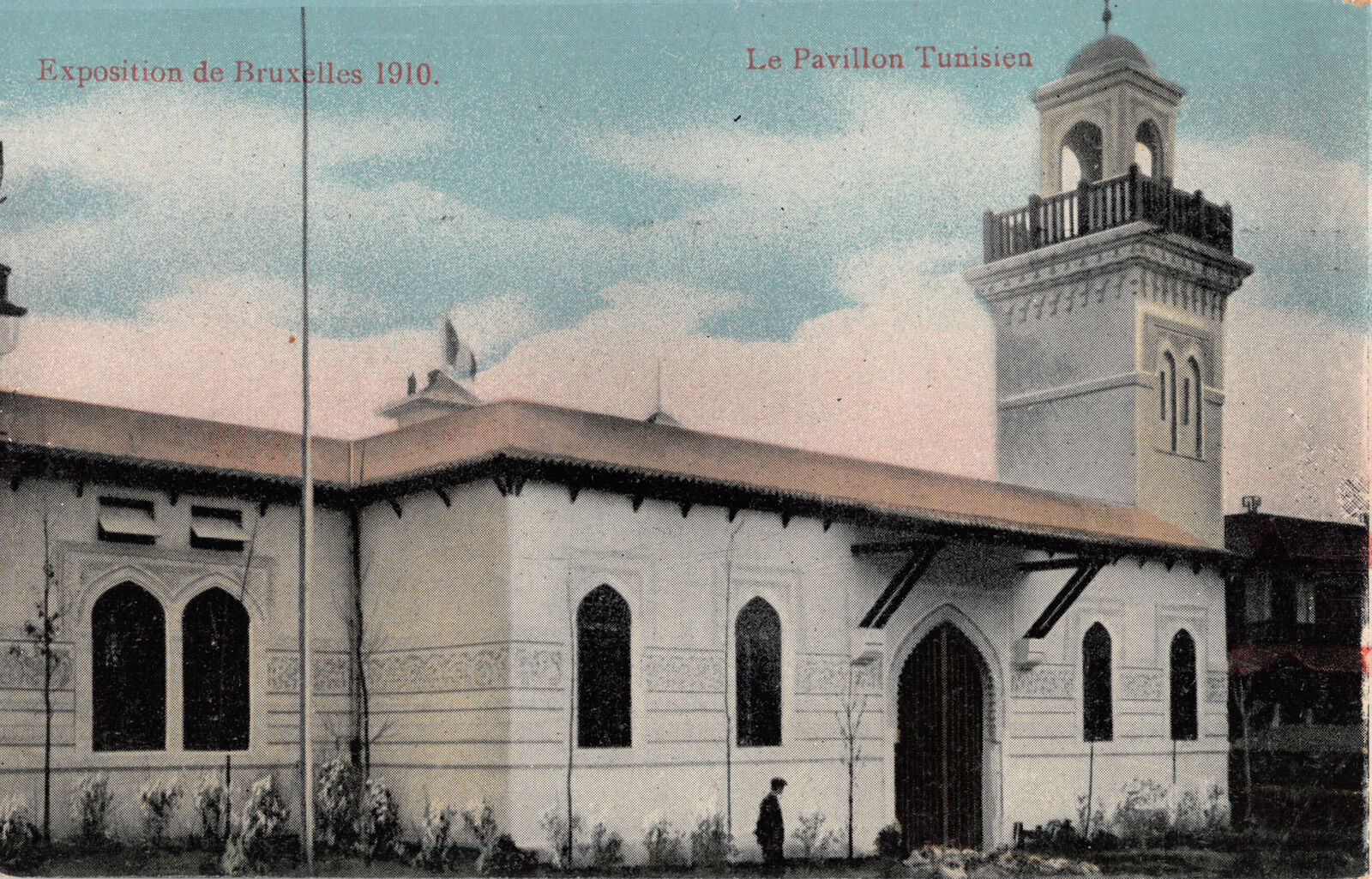
Tunisian pavilion

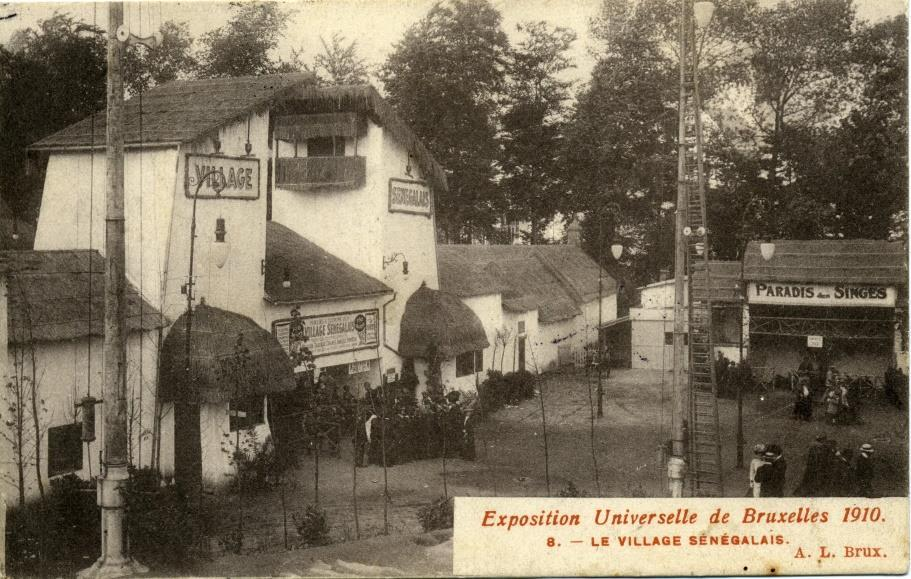
Entrance to the 'Senegalese Village'

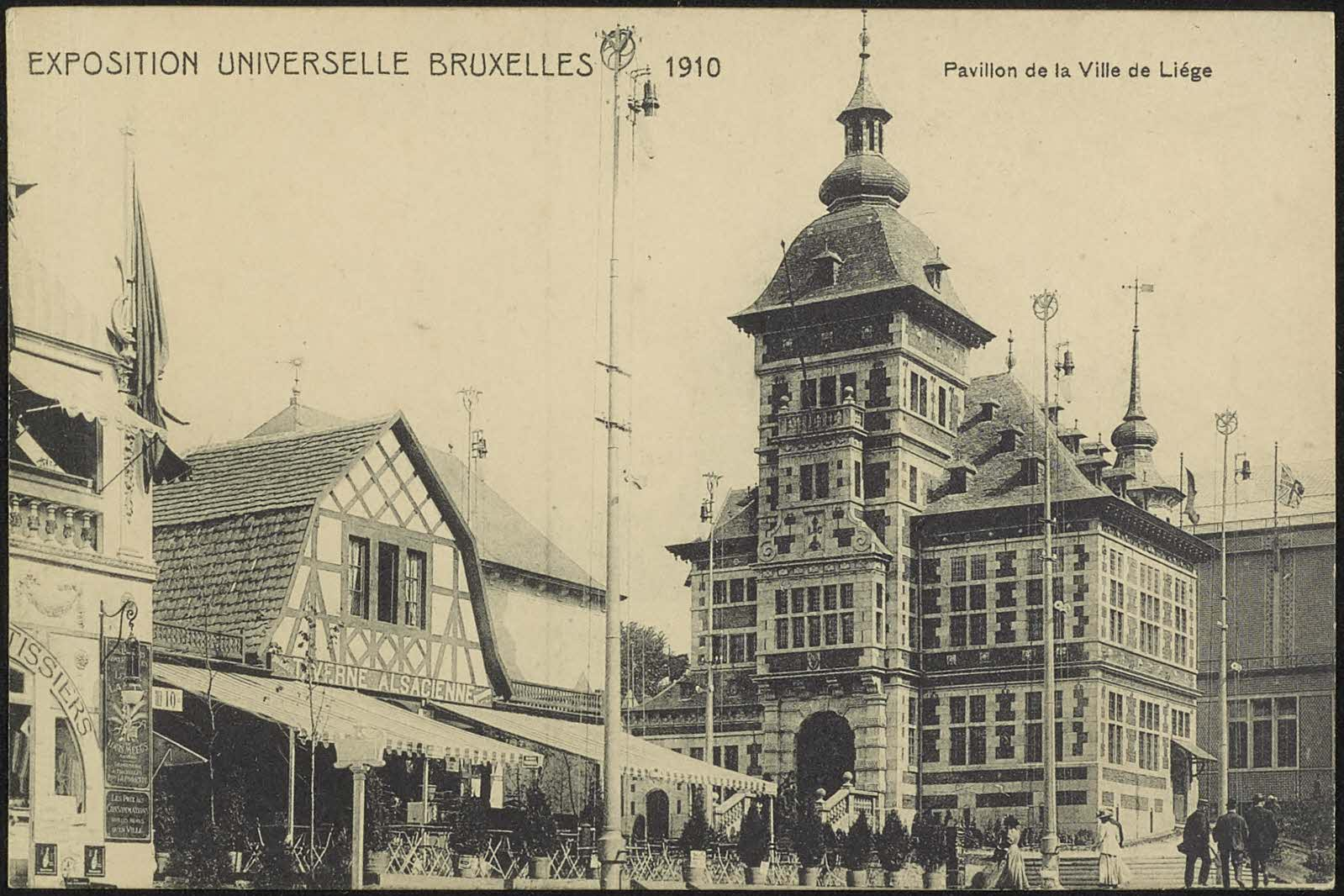
City of Liège pavilion

== Exhibits ==
The exhibition was dedicated to science, the arts, industry and trade. The fine art's section included modern art loaned by the French including three works each by Claude Monet, Auguste Rodin and Auguste Renoir, as well as two works by Henri Matisse. Painters who participated included the Belgian Aloïs Boudry who won a silver medal, and the French Adrien Karbowsky.

During the exhibition, the altarpiece of St. John Berchman's Church was presented. The Belgian engineer Jean-Baptiste Flamme also exhibited his new Type 10 pacific locomotive.

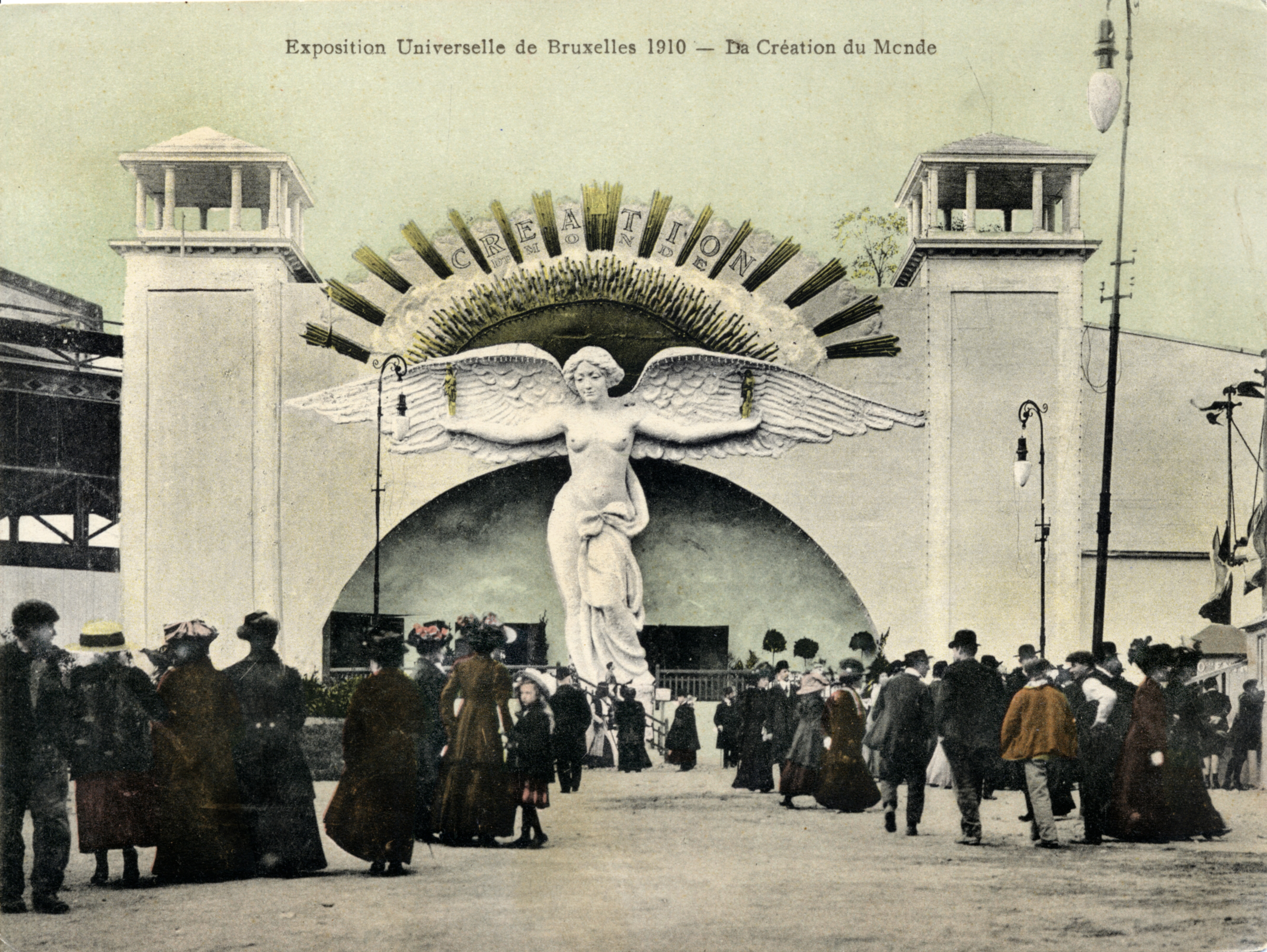
La création du monde pavilion

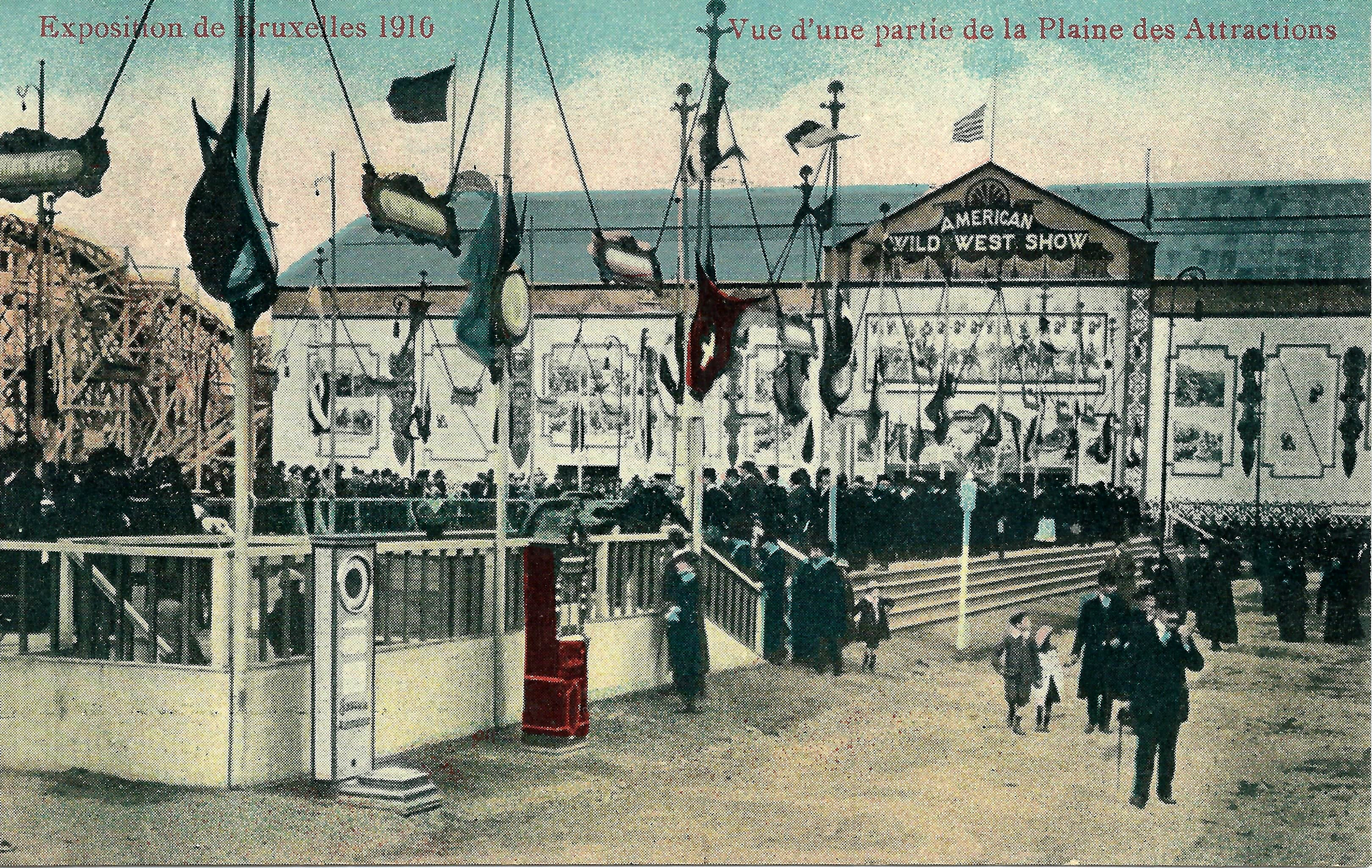
View of part of the attractions (American Wild West Show pictured)

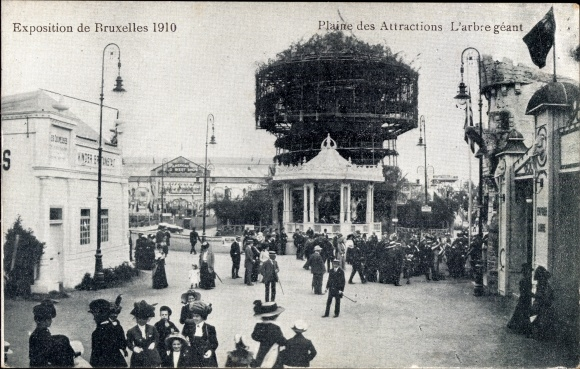
The giant tree

== Fire ==
There was a large fire on 14 and 15 August which gutted several pavilions in the Solbosch part of the exhibition. Part of the Belgian and French sections were destroyed, but the worst hit was the English section. After the fire, some destroyed parts were rebuilt at a rapid pace. This event attracted the attention of the public and the organisers were able to successfully use it for the promotion of the exhibition.

== Legacy ==
The Hotel Astoria was built for the fair, at 101–103, rue Royale/Koningsstraat, and is now a protected monument by the Monuments and Sites Directorate of the Brussels-Capital Region.

== See also ==
- Human zoo
- Brussels International Exposition (1935)
- Expo 58
