= Moszkowski =

Moszkowski, Moszkowsky, or Moszkowska may refer to:

- Alexander Moszkowski (1851–1934), Jewish Polish-German writer and satirist
- Moritz Moszkowski (1854–1925), Romantic-era composer and Alexander's brother
- Róża Etkin-Moszkowska (1908–1945), Polish pianist
- Anatolij Moszkowski (1925–2008), Soviet writer

== See also ==
- Moszkowicz
- Moskowitz
- Moscheles
- Moskovsky (disambiguation)
