= Margaret Moscheles =

British painter

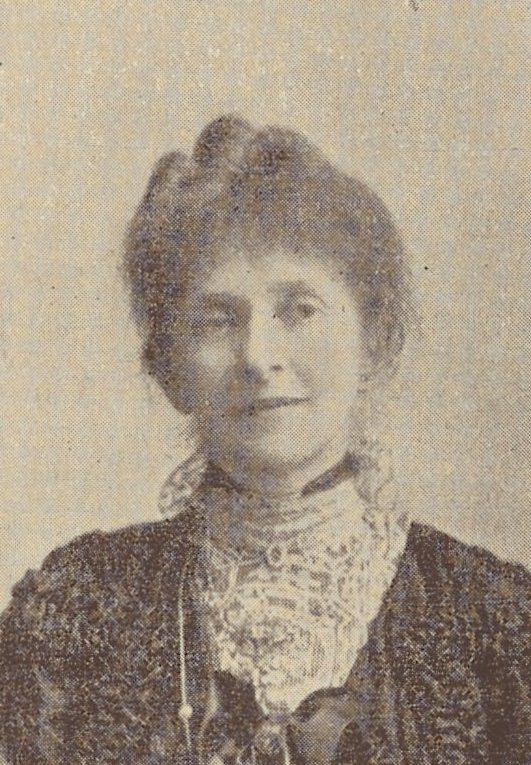
- Born: Margarethe Sobernheim; 1854; Berlin, Prussia
- Died: 1924 (aged 69–70)
- Other name: Grete Moscheles
- Known for: painting
- Spouse: Felix Moscheles

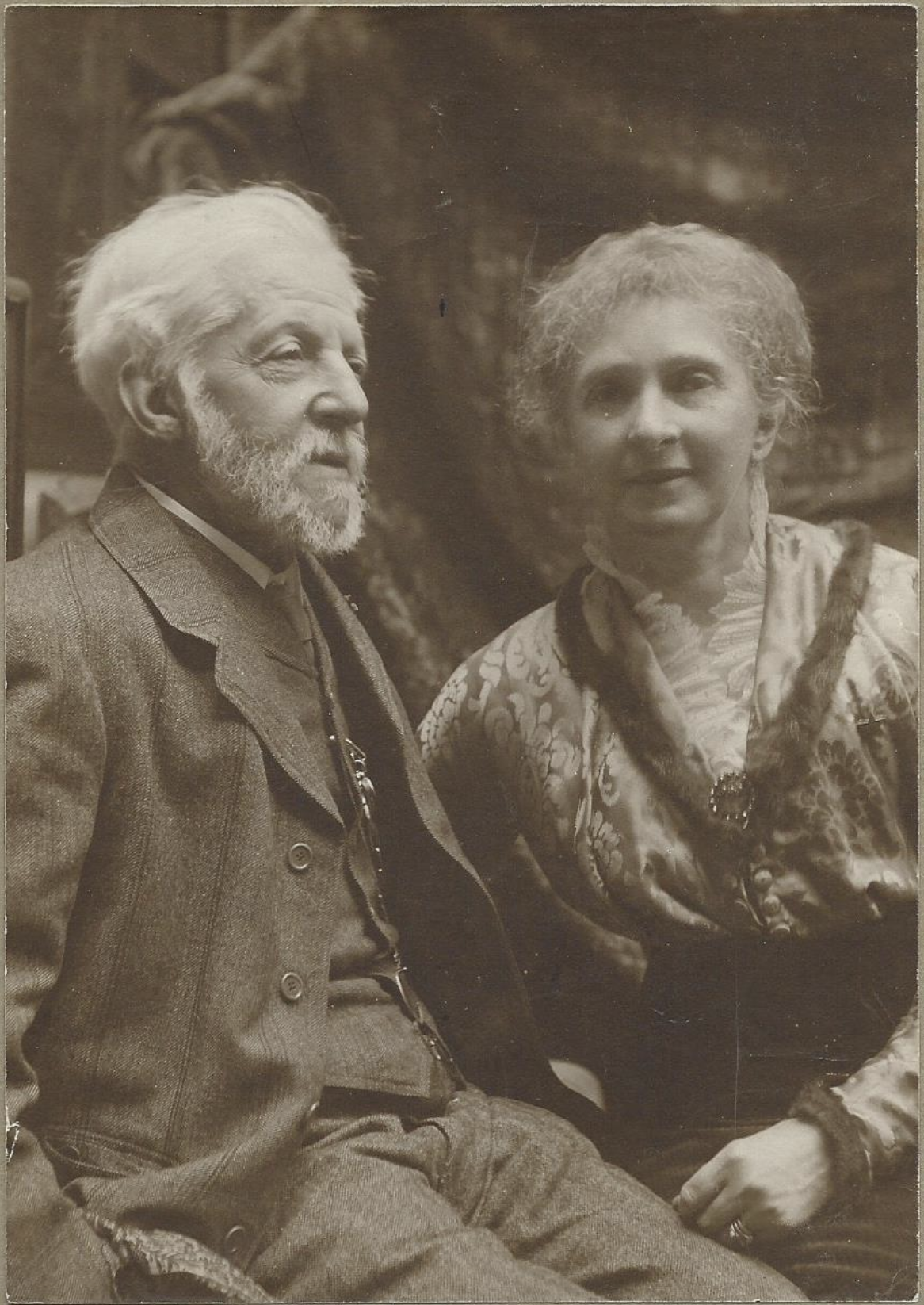
Felix and Margaret Moscheles

Margaret "Grete" Moscheles (née Margarethe Sobernheim; 1854–1924) was a British painter.

== Biography ==
She was born as Margarethe Sobernheim in 1854 in Berlin, Kingdom of Prussia. She was from a Jewish family. In 1875, she married painter Felix Moscheles in Germany, with whom she studied painting with. Margaret and her husband spent the winter of 1893 in traveling in North Africa, which inspired a body of artwork.

She showed her work at the Royal Academy of Arts in London in 1905 and 1912. In 1908, she had a group exhibition at the London Salon of the Allied Artists' Association in Royal Albert Hall.

Her work is included in various public museums including National Trust, Smallhythe Place; among others.
