= Felix Moscheles =

English painter (1833–1917)

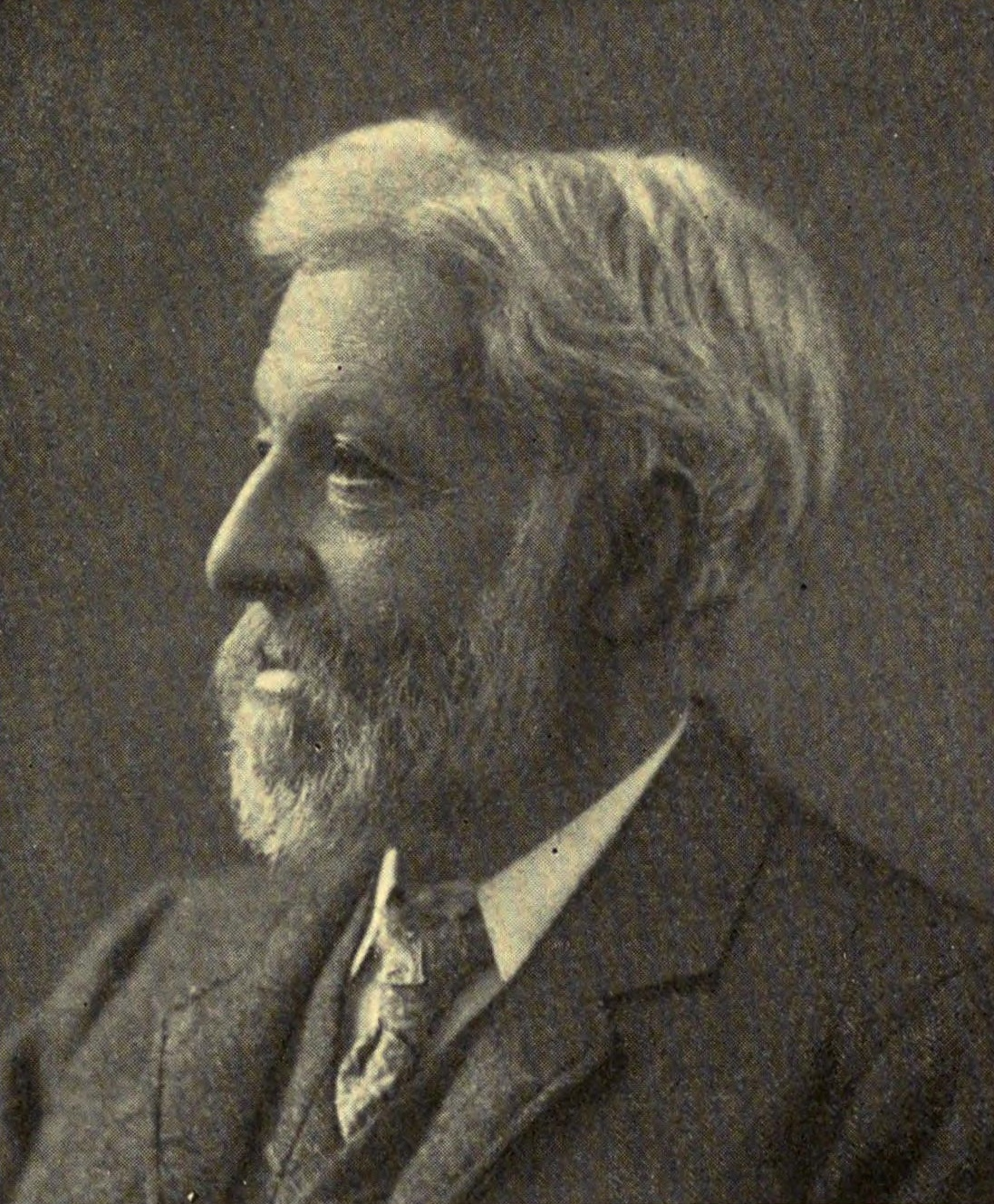
- Portrait of Felix Moscheles
- Born: Felix Stone Moscheles; 8 February 1833; London, England
- Died: 22 December 1917 (aged 84); Royal Tunbridge Wells, England
- Known for: painting
- Spouse: Margaret Moscheles
- Father: Ignaz Moscheles

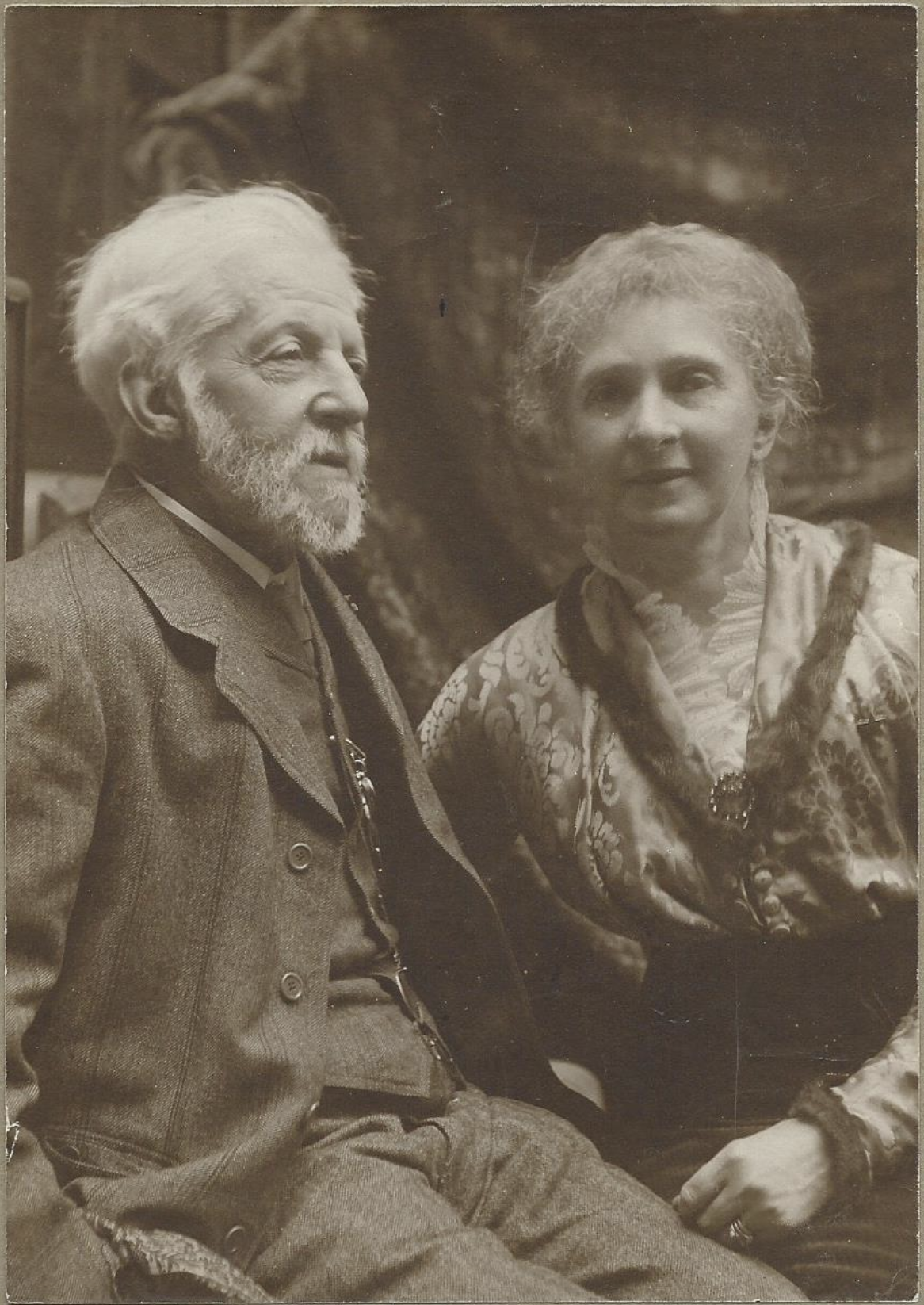
Felix and Margaret Moscheles

Felix Stone Moscheles (8 February 1833 – 22 December 1917) was an English painter, writer, peace activist and advocate of Esperanto. He frequently painted genre scenes and portraits.

== Biography ==
Born on 8 February 1833 in London to a German Jewish family, Felix Moscheles was the son of the well-known pianist and music teacher Ignaz Moscheles. The family settled in London during the early 1800s, where his father taught at the Royal Philharmonic Society. The family converted to Christianity after the move to England.

His godfather, after whom he was named, was the composer Felix Mendelssohn, who had been a pupil of his father. In the 1840s, Mendelssohn founded Leipzig Conservatory and Moscheles' father took on a teaching post there. Felix attended the St. Thomas School and went on to study art.

He married painter Margaret Moscheles (née Sobernheim) in 1875 in Germany. Together they spent the winter of 1893 in traveling in North Africa, which inspired a body of artwork. His paintings were exhibited in Paris, Antwerp and London. Felix Moscheles studied painting with Jozef Van Lerius.

In 1894, Moscheles returned to London, where he built a studio in Chelsea.

In 1903 Felix Moscheles became the first president of the London Esperanto Club. He was a pacifist and internationalist, and as such also served as president of the International Arbitration and Peace Association. He was involved in attempts to develop international dispute resolution protocols at the Hague.

He died on 22 December 1917 in Tunbridge Wells, Kent, England.

== Publications ==
- Patriotism as an Incentive to Warfare (1870; Wertheimer, London)
- In Bohemia with Du Maurier. No. 1 in a series "I Well Remember". With 63 original drawings by G. Du Maurier, illustrating the artist's life in the fifties (1896; T. Fisher Unwin, London)
- Fragments of an Autobiography (1899; James Nisbet, London)
