= Ghent =

Capital of East Flanders province, Belgium

Ghent: Gent (Dutch); Gand (French)
- City and municipality
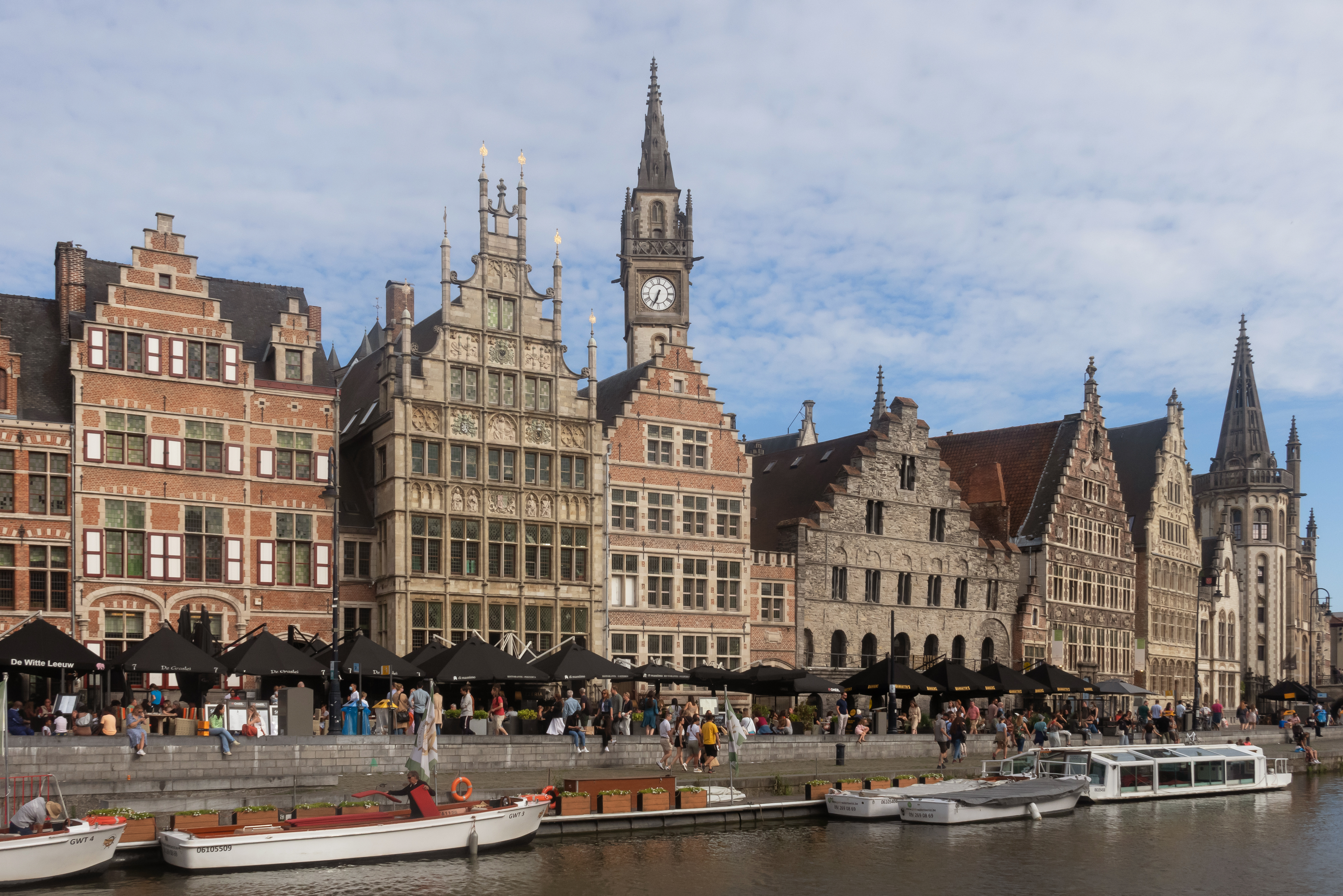
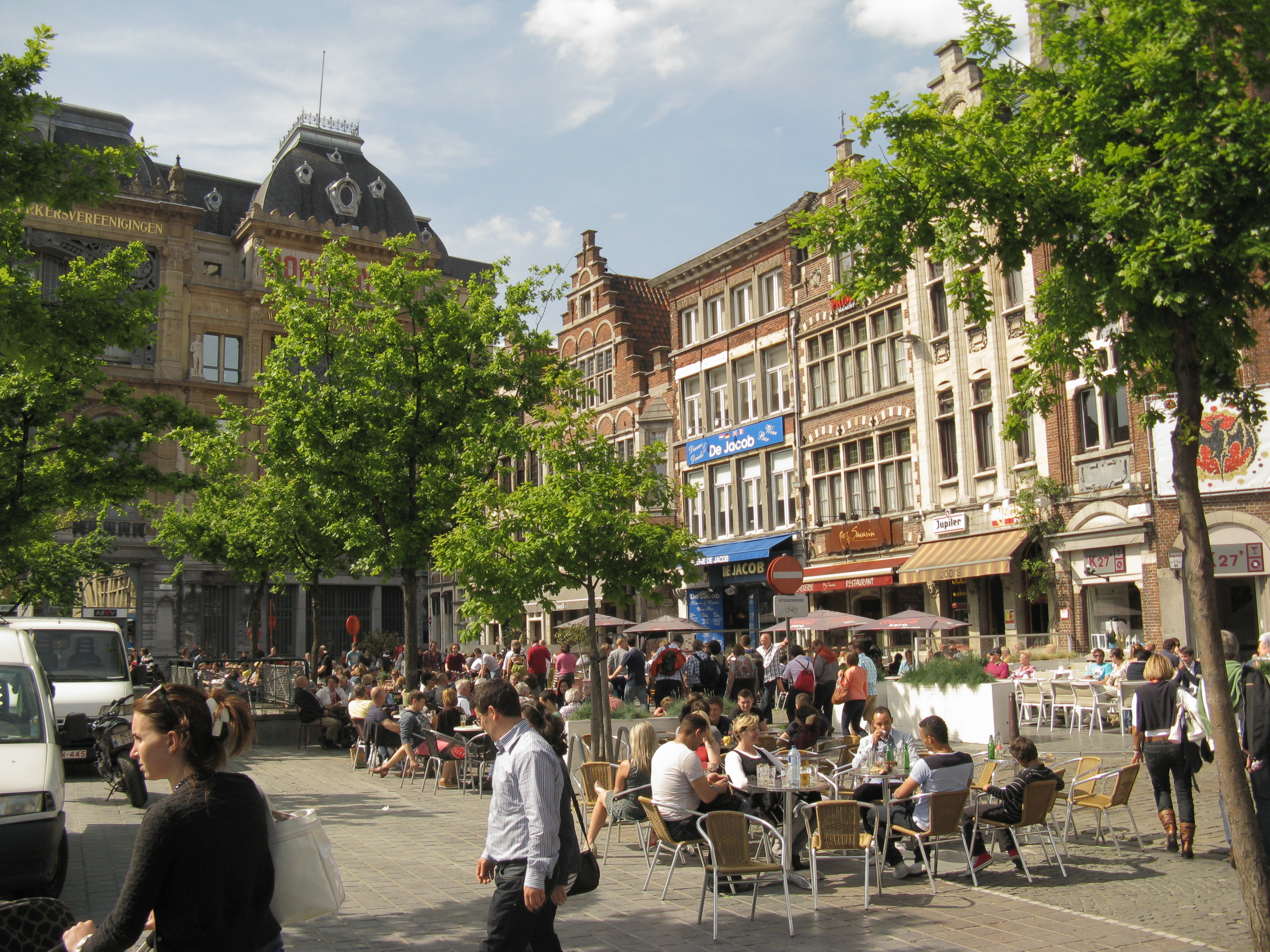
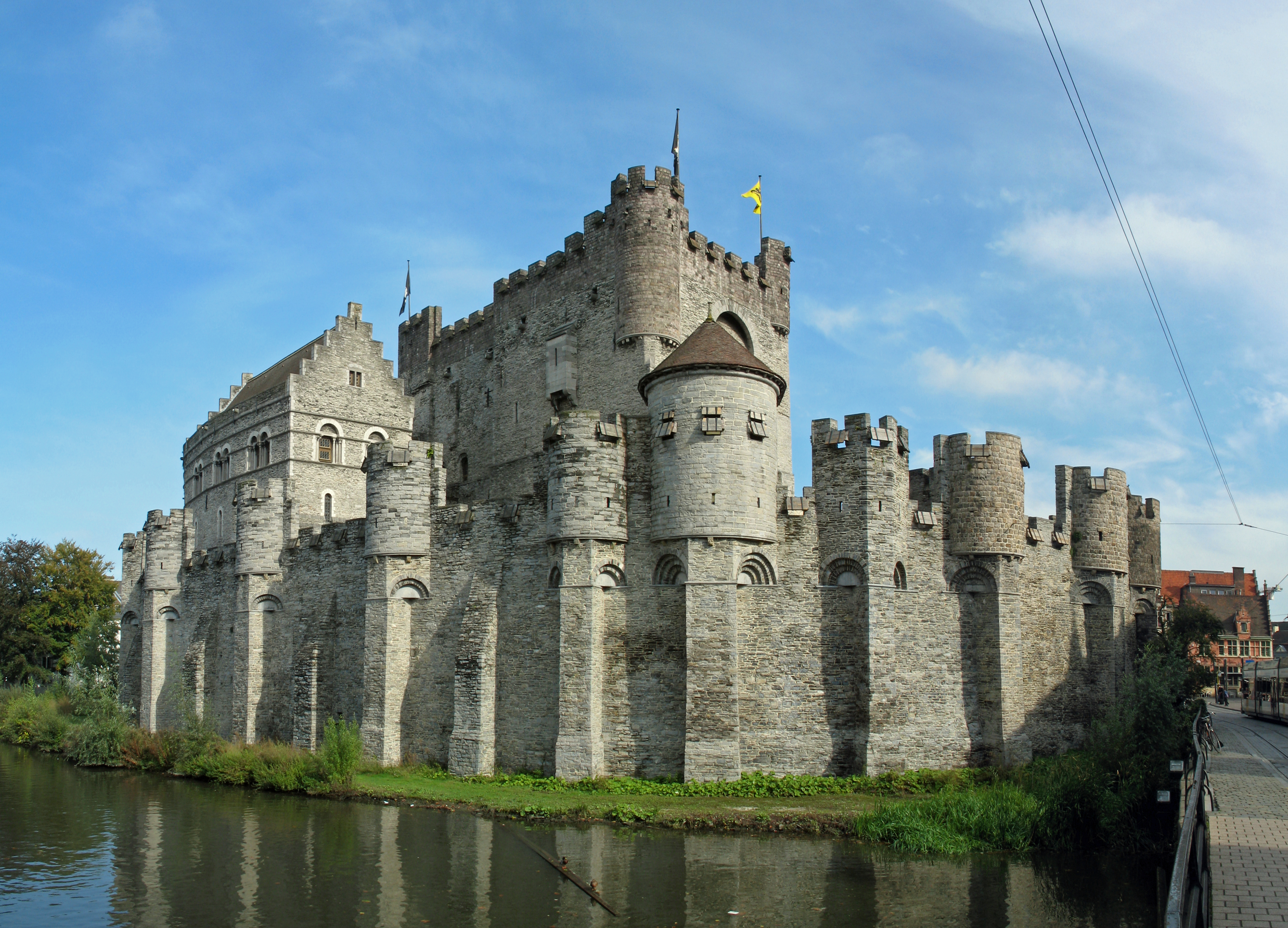
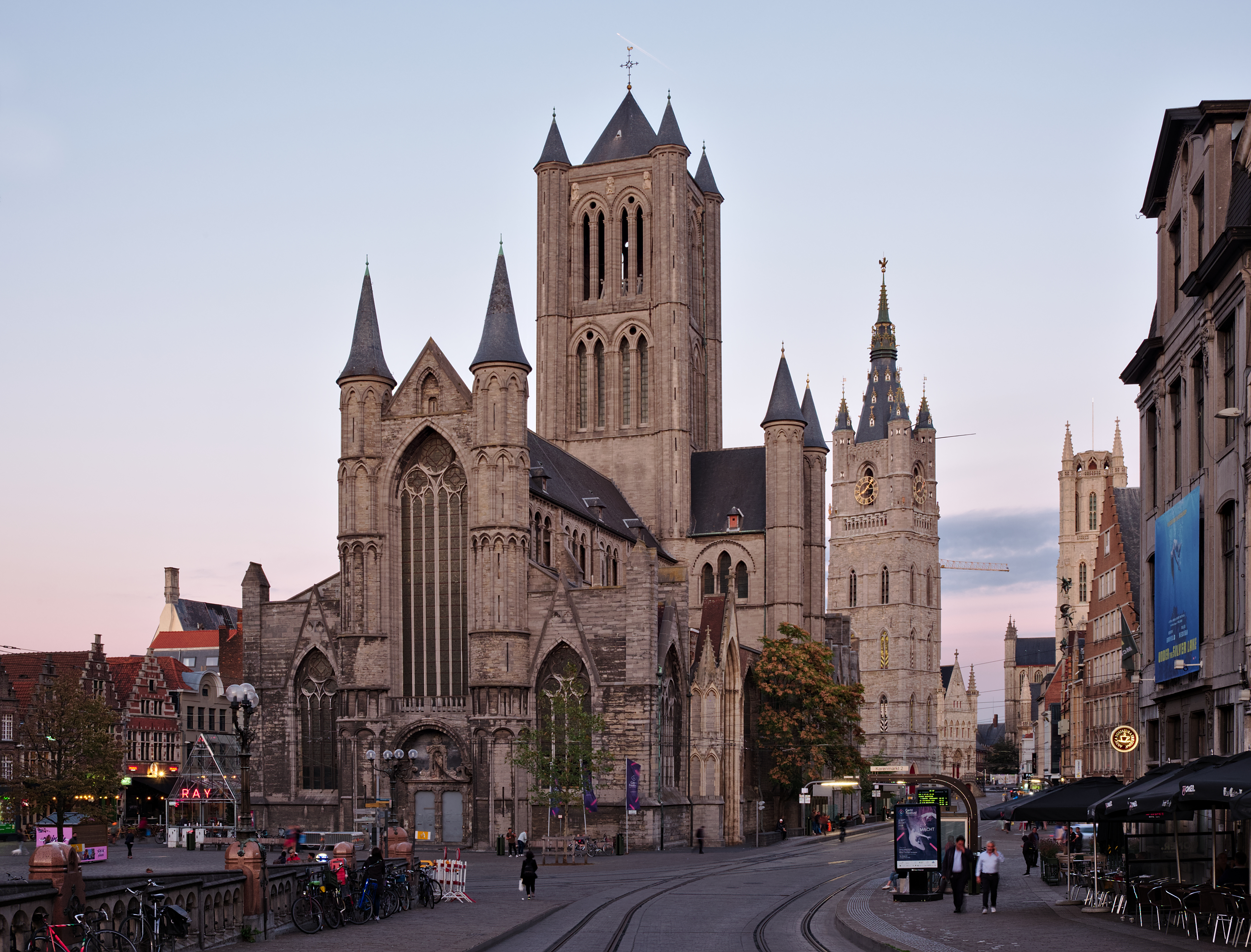
- Graslei Vrijdagmarkt Gravensteen Ghent Tower Row (St. Nicholas' Church, Belfry and St. Bavo's Cathedral)

- Flag Coat of arms

- Ghent in the province of East Flanders
- Interactive map of Ghent
- Location in Belgium
- Coordinates: 51°03′13″N 03°43′31″E
- Country: Belgium
- Community: Flemish Community
- Region: Flemish Region
- Province: East Flanders
- Arrondissement: Ghent

Government
  - Mayor (list): Mathias De Clercq Anders
  - Governing parties: Voor Gent (Vooruit, Anders) - Groen

Area
  - Total: 157.77 km^{2} (60.92 sq mi)

Population (2022-01-01)
  - Total: 265,086
  - Density: 1,680.2/km^{2} (4,351.7/sq mi)
- Postal codes: 9000–9052
- NIS code: 44021
- Area codes: 09
- Website: stad.gent
- Logo of Ghent

Ghent (Note: Dutch: Gent [ɣɛnt]; French: Gand [ɡɑ̃]; historically known as Gaunt in English.) is a city and a municipality in the East Flanders province of the Flemish Region of Belgium. It is the capital and largest city of the province and the third largest in the country, after Brussels and Antwerp. It is a port and university city.

The city originally started as a settlement at the confluence of the Rivers Scheldt and Leie. In the Late Middle Ages Ghent became one of the largest and richest cities of northern Europe, with some 50,000 people in 1300. After the late 16th century Ghent became a less important city, resulting in an extremely well-preserved historic centre, making Ghent a popular tourist destination.

The municipality comprises the city of Ghent proper and the surrounding suburbs of Afsnee, Desteldonk, Drongen, Gentbrugge, Ledeberg, Mariakerke, Mendonk, Oostakker, Sint-Amandsberg, Sint-Denijs-Westrem, Sint-Kruis-Winkel, Wondelgem and Zwijnaarde. With 270,473 inhabitants at the end of 2024, Ghent is Belgium's second largest municipality by number of inhabitants. The metropolitan area, including the outer commuter zone, covers an area of 1,205 km^{2} (465 sq mi) and had a total population of 560,522 as of 1 January 2018, which ranks it as the fourth most populous in Belgium. The current mayor of Ghent is Mathias De Clercq (Open Vld).

The ten-day-long Ghent Festival (Gentse Feesten) is held every year and attended by about 1–1.5 million visitors.

== History ==
Archaeological evidence shows human presence around the confluence of the Scheldt and the Leie going back as far as the Stone Age and the Iron Age.

Most historians believe that the older name for Ghent, 'Ganda', is derived from the Celtic word ganda, which means 'confluence', or 'river mouth', referring to the Leie river debouching into the Scheldt. Other sources connect its name with an obscure deity named Gontia.

There are no written records of the Roman period, but archaeological research confirms that the Ghent area continued to be inhabited.

When the Franks invaded the Roman territories from the end of the 4th century and well into the 5th century, they brought their language with them, and Celtic and Latin were replaced by Old Dutch.

=== Middle Ages ===
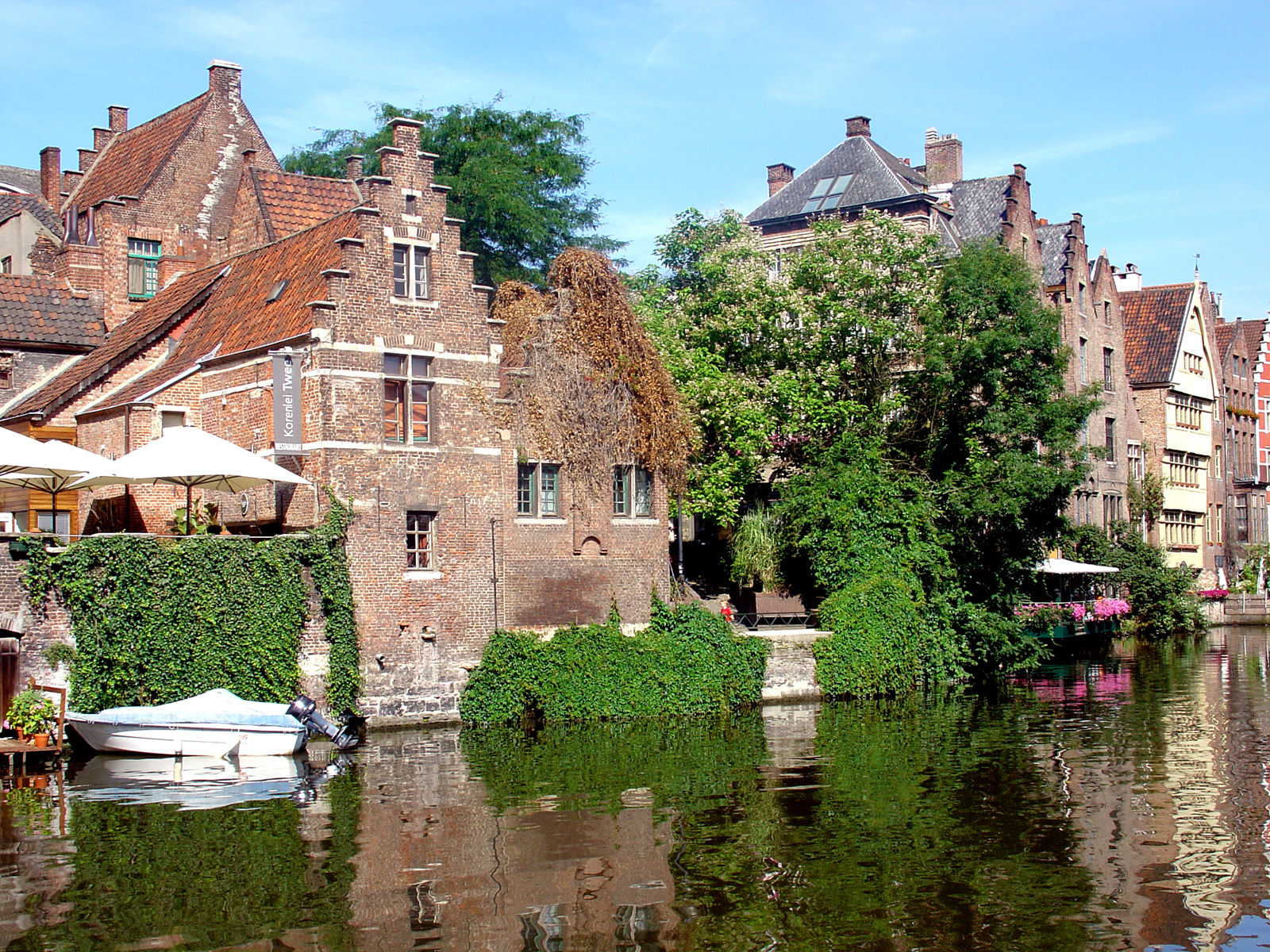
Buildings along the river Leie in Ghent

Around 650, Saint Amand founded two abbeys in Ghent: St. Peter's (Blandinium) and St. Bavo's Abbey. Around 800, Louis the Pious, son of Charlemagne, appointed Einhard, the biographer of Charlemagne, abbot of both abbeys. The city grew from several nuclei, the abbeys, and a commercial centre. However, in 851 and 879 the city was plundered by Vikings.

Under the protection of the County of Flanders the city recovered and flourished from the 11th century, growing to become a small city-state. By the 13th century, Ghent was the biggest city in Europe north of the Alps after Paris; it was bigger than Cologne or Moscow. Up to 65,000 people lived within the city walls. The belfry and the towers of the St. Bavo's Cathedral and St. Nicholas' Church are just a few examples of the skyline of the period.

The rivers flowed in an area where much land was periodically flooded. These rich grass 'meersen' ("water-meadows": a word related to the English 'marsh') were ideally suited for grazing sheep, the wool of which was used to make cloth.

By the 13th century, Ghent had become Europe's leading woollen cloth manufacturing centre. By the mid-century, the city's cloth industry employed 4,000 weavers and 1,200 fullers. Wool was imported from Scotland and England, although during the Hundred Years' War trade suffered significantly.

Ghent was the birthplace of John of Gaunt, Duke of Lancaster.

=== Early modern period ===
The city recovered in the 15th century when Flanders was united with neighbouring provinces under the Dukes of Burgundy. High taxes led to a rebellion and eventually to the Battle of Gavere in 1453, in which Ghent suffered a terrible defeat at the hands of Philip the Good. Around this time the centre of political and social importance in the Low Countries started to shift from Flanders (Bruges–Ghent) to Brabant (Antwerp–Brussels), although Ghent continued to play an important role. With Bruges, the city led two revolts against Maximilian of Austria, the first monarch of the House of Habsburg to rule Flanders.

View on the city of Ghent in 1540 by Lucas de Heere

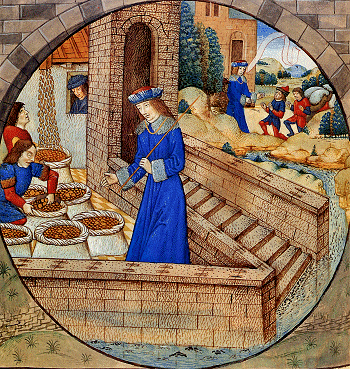
15th-century Ghent miniature of Joseph, showing daily life there

In 1500, Juana of Castile gave birth to Charles V, who became Holy Roman Emperor and King of Spain. Although native to Ghent, he punished the city after the 1539 Revolt of Ghent and obliged the city's nobles to walk in front of the Emperor barefoot with a noose (Dutch: "strop") around the neck; since this incident, the people of Ghent have been called "Stroppendragers" (noose bearers). St. Bavo's Abbey (not to be confused with the nearby St. Bavo's Cathedral) was abolished, torn down, and replaced with a fortress for Royal Spanish troops. Only a small portion of the abbey was spared demolition.

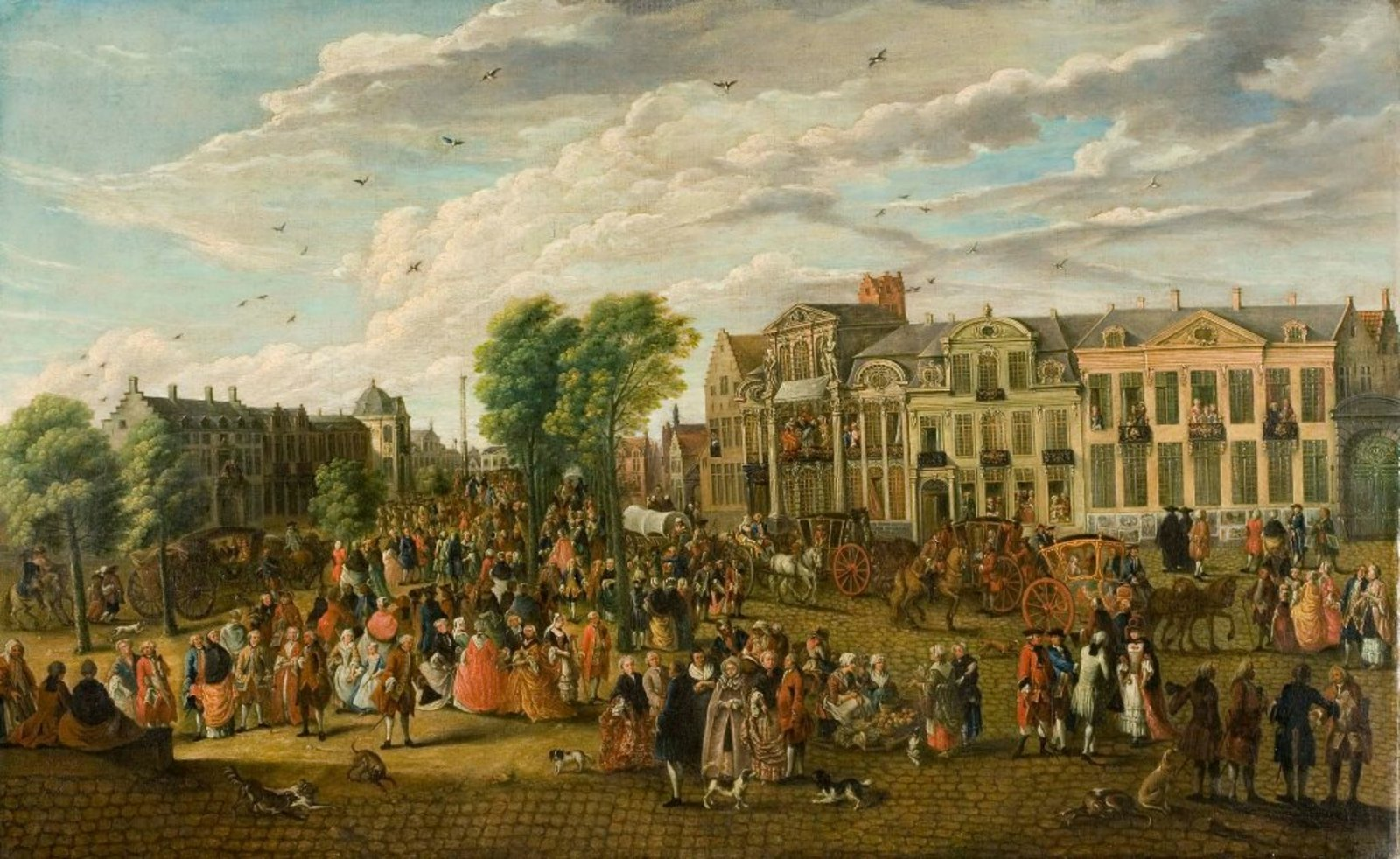
De Kouter in Ghent in 1763 by Engelbert van Siclers

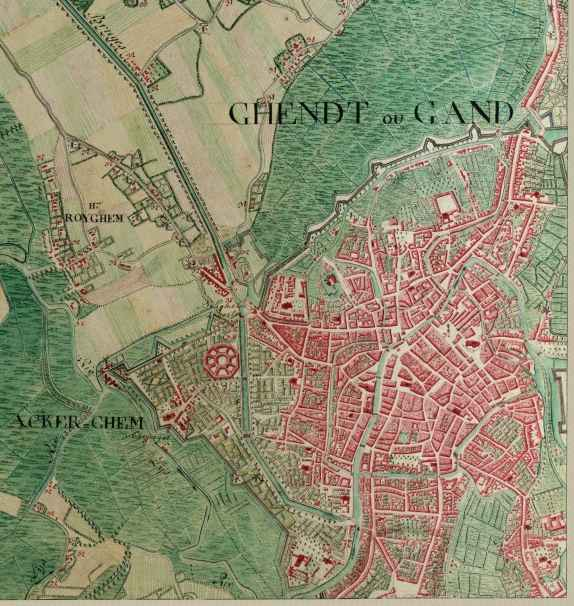
Ghent in 1775 on the Ferraris map

The late 16th and 17th centuries brought devastation because of the Eighty Years' War. The war ended the role of Ghent as a centre of international importance. In 1745, the city was captured by French forces during the War of the Austrian Succession before being returned to the Empire of Austria under the House of Habsburg following the Treaty of Aix-la-Chapelle in 1748. This part of Flanders became known as the Austrian Netherlands until the exile of the French Emperor Napoleon I, the end of the French Revolutionary and later Napoleonic Wars, and the peace treaties arrived at by the Congress of Vienna in 1815.

=== 19th century ===
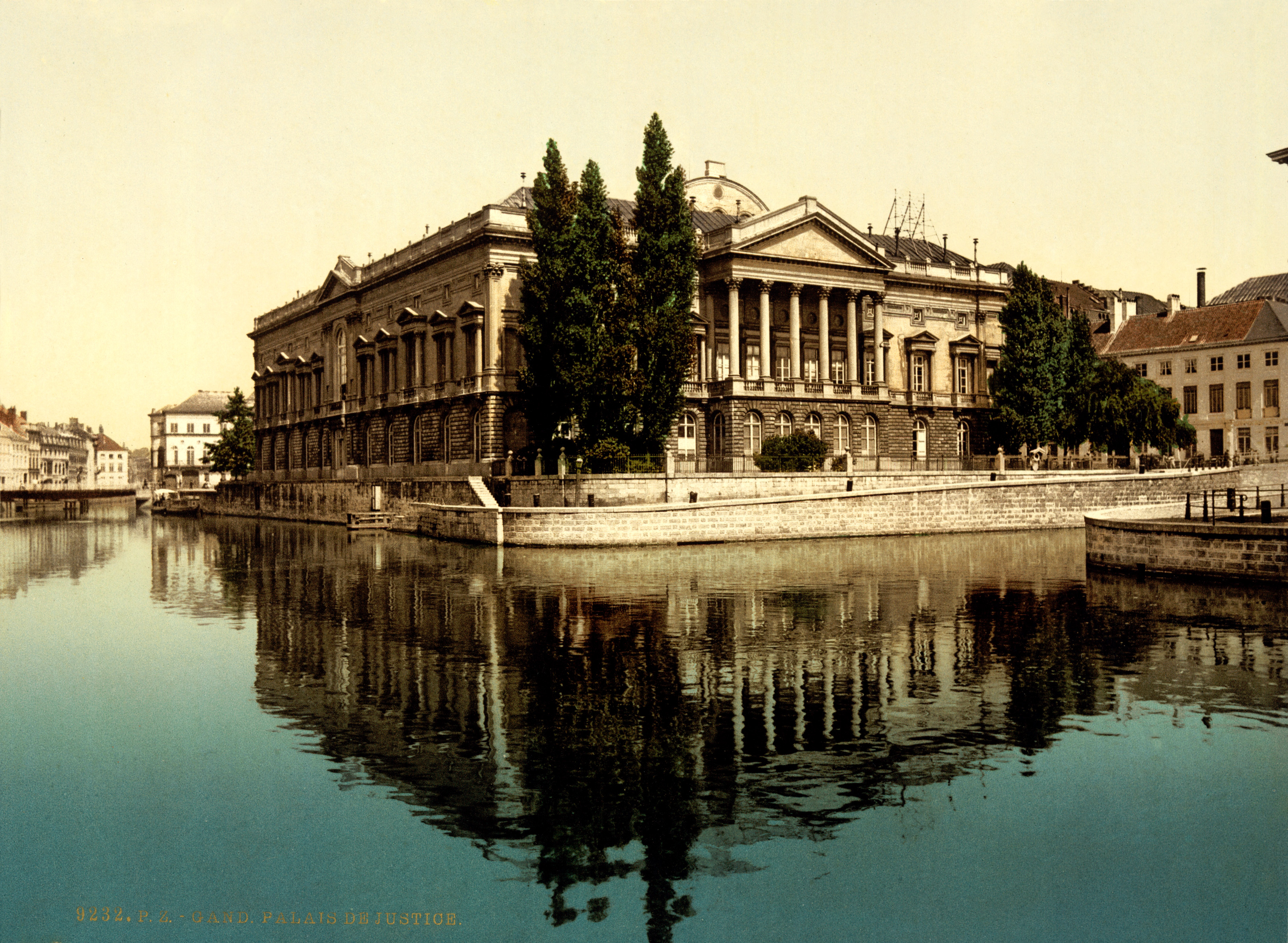
The Palace of Justice in Ghent, c. 1895

In the 18th and 19th centuries, Ghent's textile industry flourished again. Lieven Bauwens, having smuggled the industrial and factory machine plans out of England, introduced the first mechanical weaving machine on the European continent in 1800.

The Treaty of Ghent, negotiated here and adopted on Christmas Eve 1814, formally ended the War of 1812 between Great Britain and the United States (the North American phase of the Napoleonic Wars). After the Battle of Waterloo, Ghent and Flanders, previously ruled from the House of Habsburg in Vienna as the Austrian Netherlands, became a part of the United Kingdom of the Netherlands with the northern Dutch for 15 years. In this period, Ghent established its own university (1816) and a new connection to the sea (1824–27).

After the Belgian Revolution of 1830–31, with the loss of port access to the sea for more than a decade, the local economy collapsed, and the first Belgian trade union originated in Ghent. In 1913 there was a world exhibition in Ghent. As a preparation for these festivities, the Sint-Pieters railway station was completed in 1912.

=== 20th century ===
Ghent was occupied by the Germans in both world wars but escaped severe destruction. The life of the people and the German invaders in Ghent during World War I is described by H. Wandt in "etappenleven te Gent". In World War II the city was liberated by the British 7th "Desert Rats" Armoured Division and local Belgian fighters on 6 September 1944, with the northern suburbs and the industrial area cleared over the following days by the 15th (Scottish) Infantry Division.

== Geography ==
Municipalities

After the fusions of municipalities in 1965 and 1977, the city is made up of following sub-municipalities:

- I Ghent
- II Mariakerke
- III Drongen
- IV Wondelgem
- V Sint-Amandsberg
- VI Oostakker
- VII Desteldonk
- VIII Mendonk
- IX Sint-Kruis-Winkel
- X Ledeberg
- XI Gentbrugge
- XII Afsnee
- XIII Sint-Denijs-Westrem
- XIV Zwijnaarde

=== Neighbouring municipalities ===
- Wachtebeke
- Lochristi
- Destelbergen
- Melle
- Merelbeke
- De Pinte
- Sint-Martens-Latem
- Deinze
- Lievegem
- Evergem
- Zelzate

=== Climate ===
The climate in this area has mild differences between highs and lows, and there is adequate rainfall year-round. According to the Köppen climate classification system, Ghent has a marine west coast climate, abbreviated "Cfb" on climate maps.

Climate data for Ghent (1991–2020 normals)
| Month | Jan | Feb | Mar | Apr | May | Jun | Jul | Aug | Sep | Oct | Nov | Dec | Year |
|---|---|---|---|---|---|---|---|---|---|---|---|---|---|
| Mean daily maximum °C (°F) | 6.7 (44.1) | 7.6 (45.7) | 11.1 (52.0) | 15.1 (59.2) | 18.6 (65.5) | 21.3 (70.3) | 23.4 (74.1) | 23.4 (74.1) | 20.0 (68.0) | 15.4 (59.7) | 10.4 (50.7) | 7.1 (44.8) | 15.0 (59.0) |
| Daily mean °C (°F) | 3.9 (39.0) | 4.3 (39.7) | 7.0 (44.6) | 10.0 (50.0) | 13.6 (56.5) | 16.4 (61.5) | 18.4 (65.1) | 18.2 (64.8) | 15.1 (59.2) | 11.4 (52.5) | 7.4 (45.3) | 4.5 (40.1) | 10.9 (51.6) |
| Mean daily minimum °C (°F) | 1.1 (34.0) | 1.1 (34.0) | 2.8 (37.0) | 4.8 (40.6) | 8.6 (47.5) | 11.5 (52.7) | 13.4 (56.1) | 13.0 (55.4) | 10.2 (50.4) | 7.4 (45.3) | 4.3 (39.7) | 1.8 (35.2) | 6.7 (44.1) |
| Average precipitation mm (inches) | 72.7 (2.86) | 61.3 (2.41) | 56.2 (2.21) | 46.2 (1.82) | 62.7 (2.47) | 72.0 (2.83) | 81.7 (3.22) | 90.8 (3.57) | 75.8 (2.98) | 74.3 (2.93) | 88.6 (3.49) | 93.4 (3.68) | 875.6 (34.47) |
| Average precipitation days (≥ 1.0 mm) | 12.7 | 11.7 | 10.6 | 9.6 | 10.0 | 10.1 | 10.5 | 10.8 | 10.5 | 11.9 | 13.7 | 14.2 | 136.5 |
| Mean monthly sunshine hours | 65 | 82 | 139 | 191 | 219 | 217 | 224 | 210 | 164 | 121 | 71 | 55 | 1,757 |
Source: Royal Meteorological Institute

== Demographics ==
=== Nationalities ===
Ethnic background (2020)
| Belgian | 64.5% |
| Asian | 12.6% |
| Eastern European | 9.1% |
| Other Western European | 5.0% |
| North African | 3.4% |
| Sub-Saharan African | 3.3% |
| Other | 1.8% |
| Total non-Belgian | 35.5% |

Ghent is home to many people of foreign origin and immigrants. The 2020 census revealed that 35.5% of the inhabitants had roots outside of Belgium and 15.3% had a non-Belgian nationality. Many neighbourhoods already have a minority-majority population, primarily in the north, east, and west of the city and some pockets in the south. Some examples are Brugse Poort, Dampoort, Rabot, Ledeberg, Nieuw Gent/UZ and the area around Sleepstraat (known for its many Turkish restaurants).

| Group of origin | Year | |
| Group of origin | 2023 | |
| Group of origin | Number | % |
|---|---|---|
| Belgians with Belgian background | 165,164 | 61.6% |
| Belgians with foreign background | 56,990 | 21.26% |
| Neighboring country | 5,523 | 2.06% |
| EU27 (excluding neighboring country) | 5,354 | 2% |
| Outside EU 27 | 46,113 | 17.2% |
| Non-Belgians | 45,968 | 17.14% |
| Neighboring country | 4,691 | 1.75% |
| EU27 (excluding neighboring country) | 20,355 | 7.59% |
| Outside EU 27 | 20,922 | 7.8% |
| Total | 268,122 | 100% |

== Politics ==
The composition of the 2025–2031 city council:

| party | seats |
|---|---|
| Voor Gent* | 19 |
| Groen | 14 |
| N-VA | 10 |
| CD&V | 4 |
| PVDA | 3 |
| Vlaams Belang | 3 |

*The party 'Voor Gent' is a local coalition party of Vooruit and Open VLD.

== Culture and tourism ==
=== Architecture ===
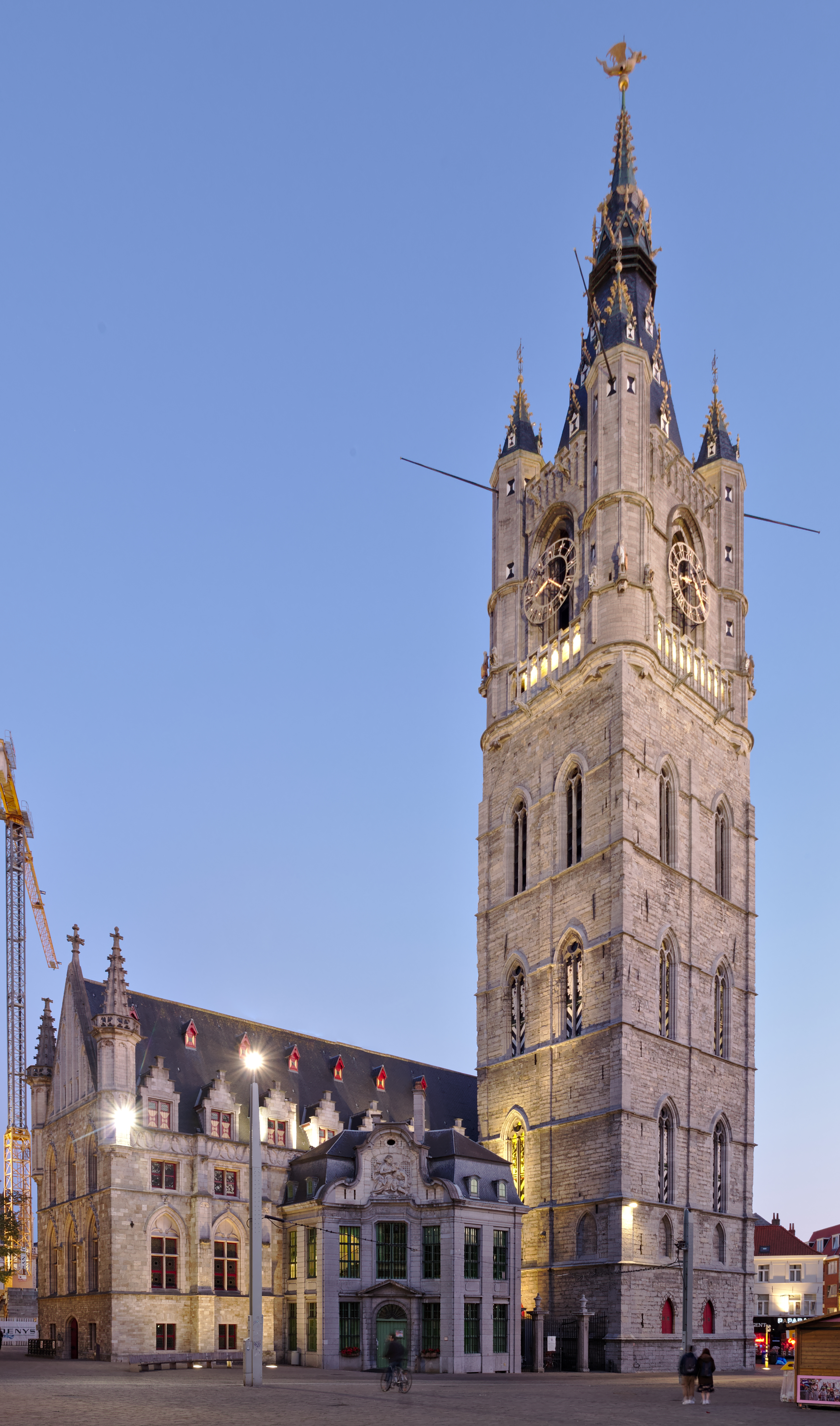
The Belfry of Ghent, a UNESCO World Heritage Site

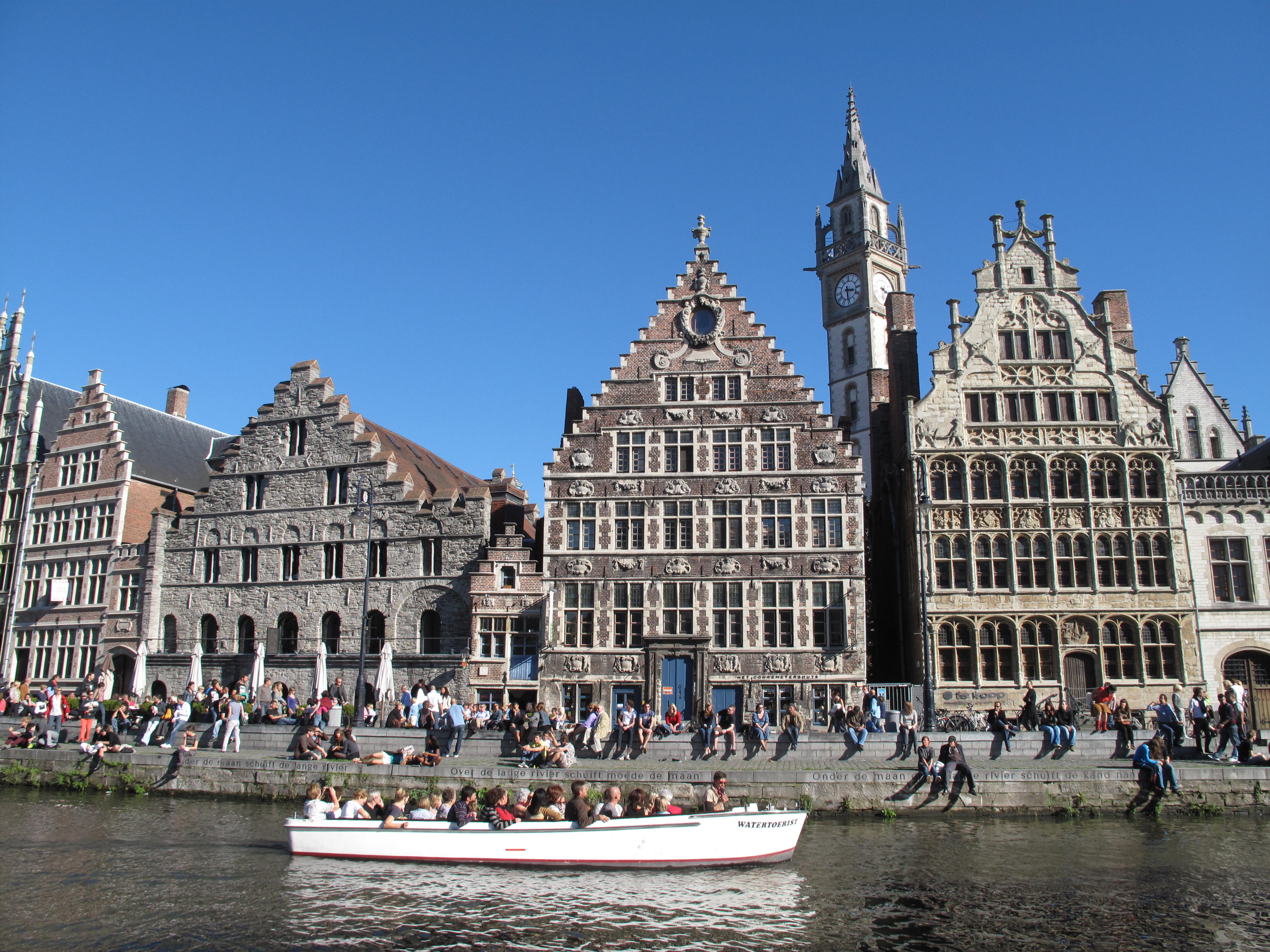
The Graslei, in the old city centre

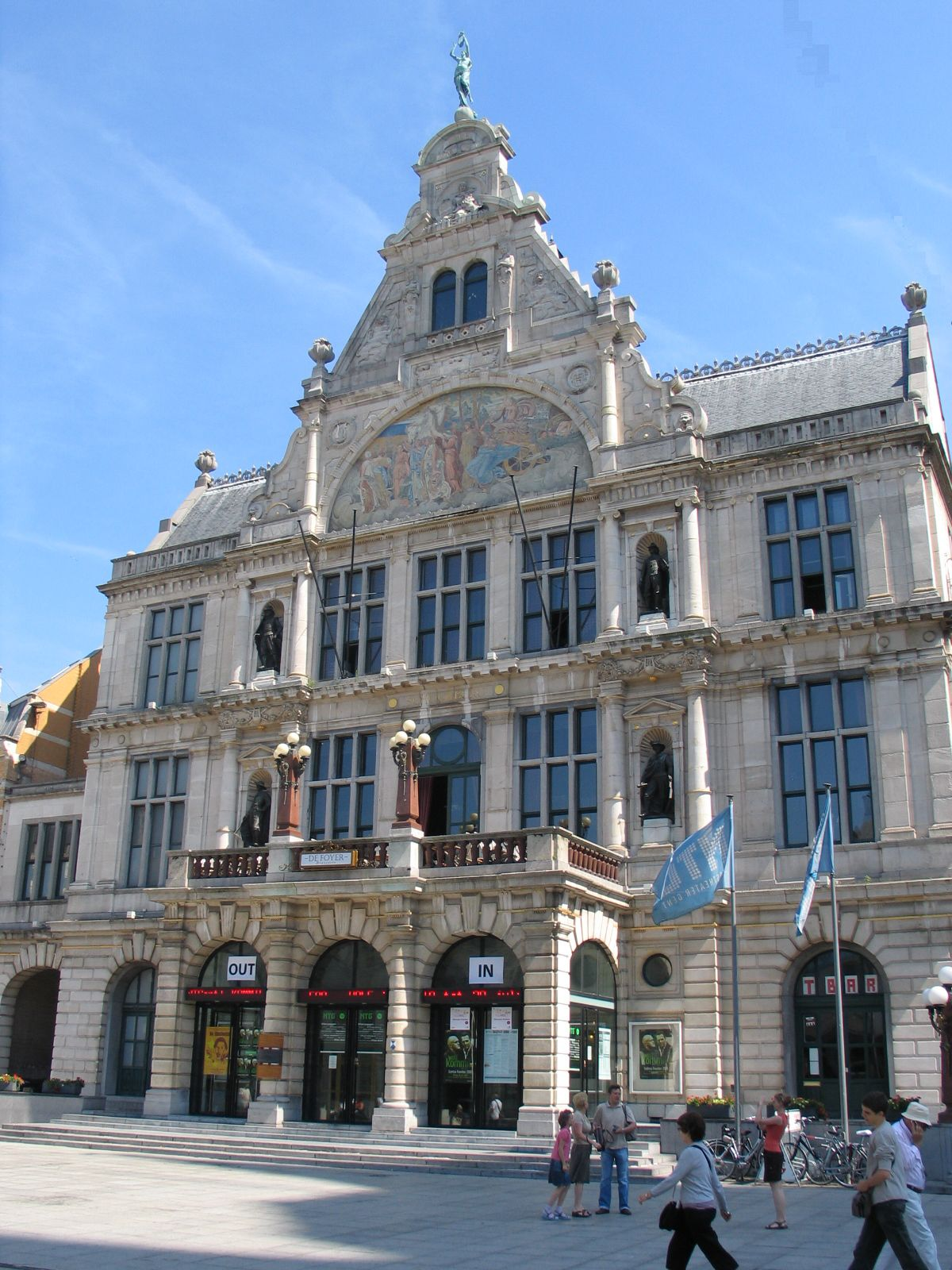
The Royal Dutch Theatre

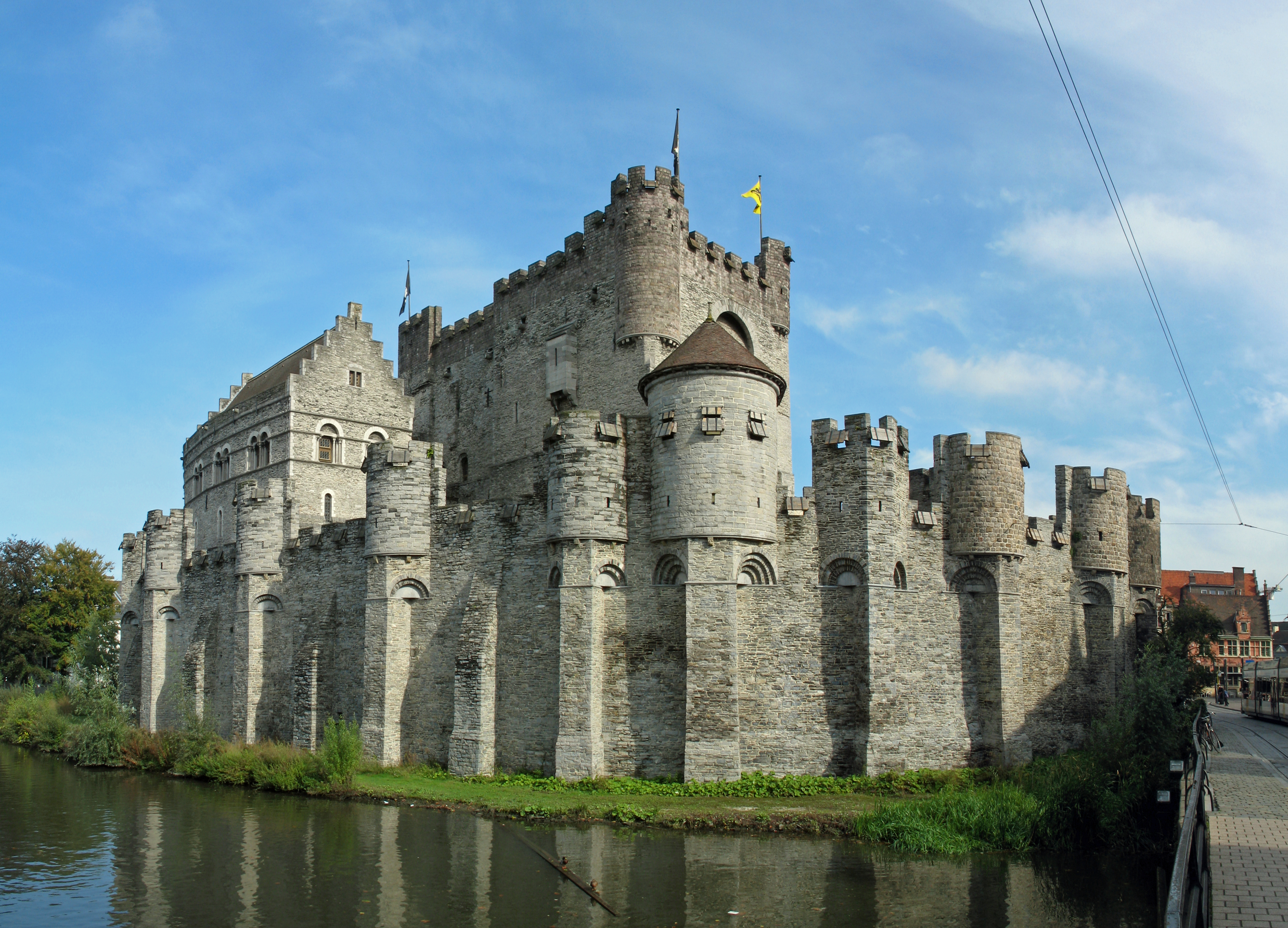
The Gravensteen

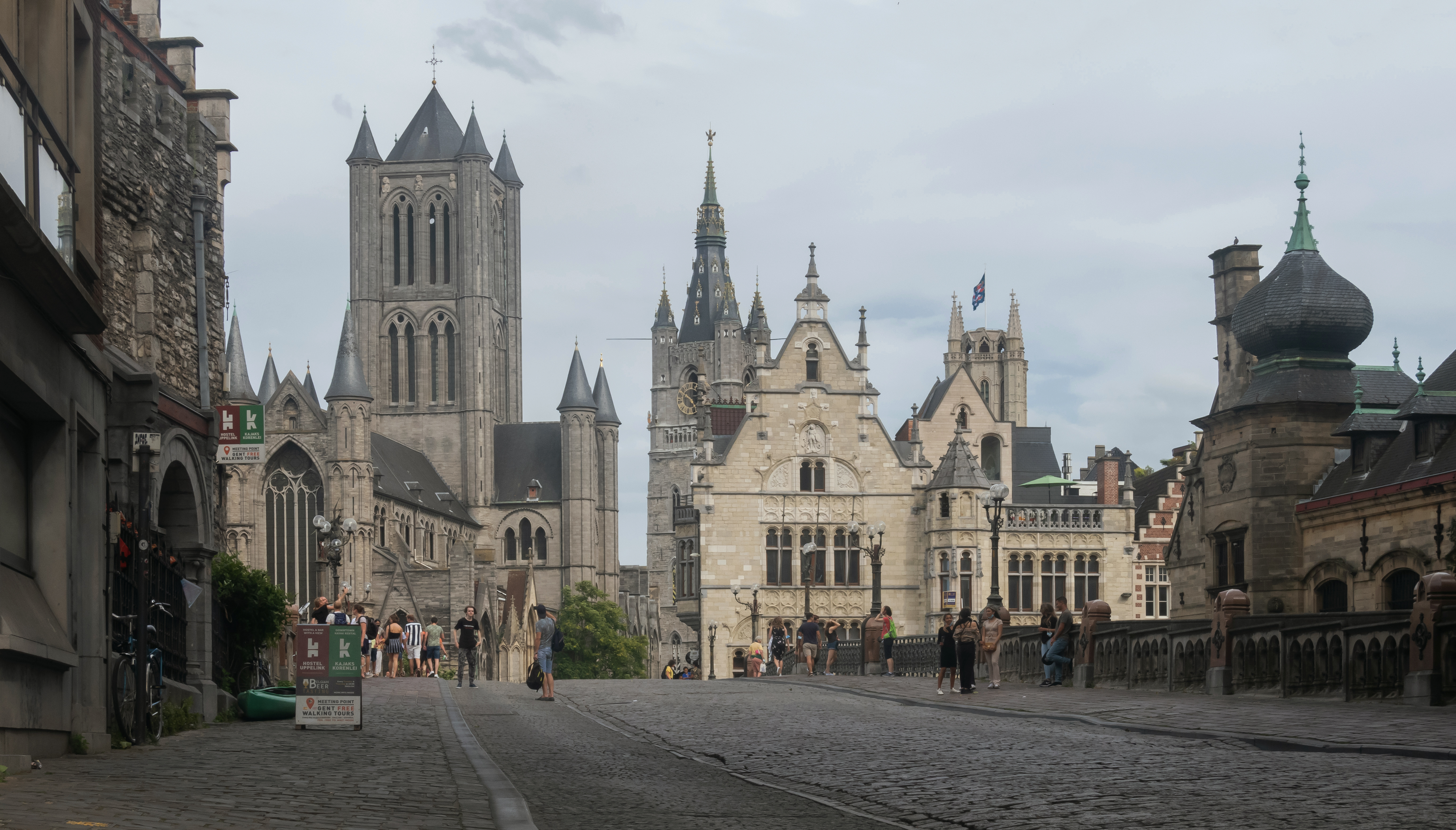
Historical centre of Ghent – from left to right: Old post office, St. Nicholas' Church, Belfry, and St. Bavo's Cathedral

(in background, with flag flying from the tower)

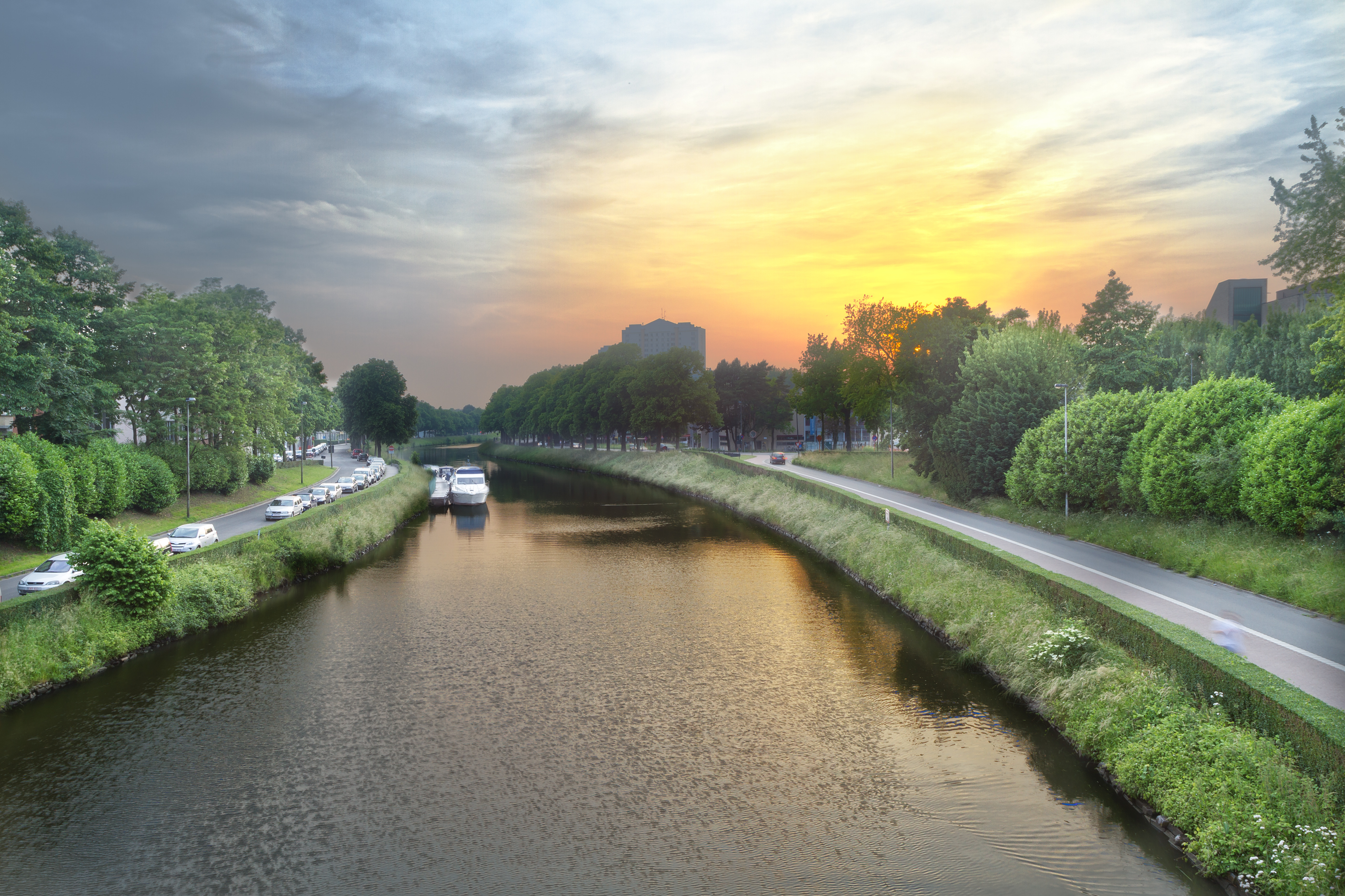
Sunset over the river Leie in Ghent

Much of the city's medieval architecture remains intact and is remarkably well preserved and restored. Its centre is a carfree area. Highlights are St. Bavo's Cathedral with the Ghent Altarpiece, the belfry, the Gravensteen castle, and the splendid architecture along the old Graslei harbour. Ghent has established a blend between comfort of living and history; it is not a city-museum. The city of Ghent also houses three béguinages and numerous churches including St. Jacob's Church, St. Nicholas' Church, St. Michael's Church and St. Stefanus' Church.

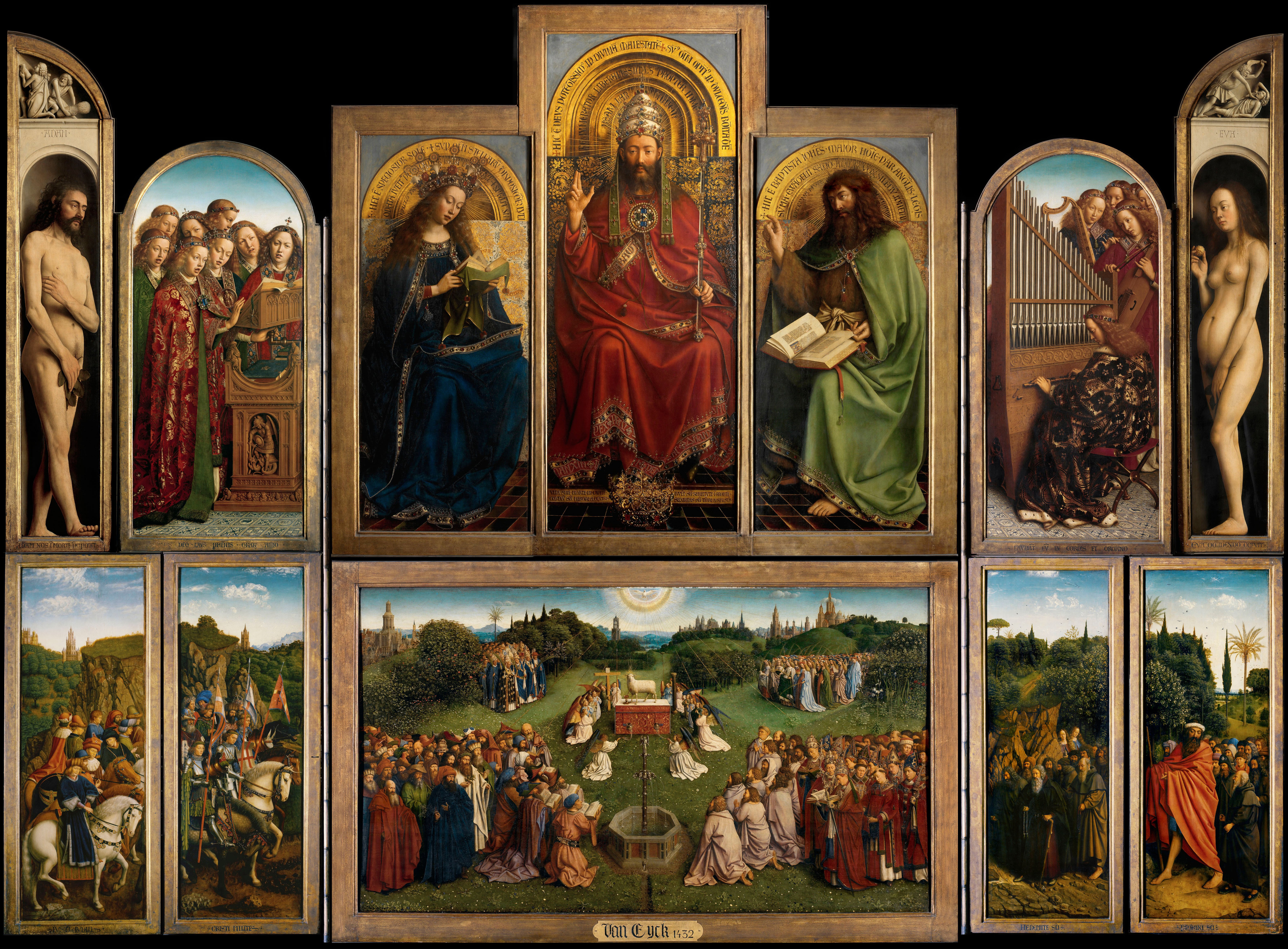
The well-known Ghent Altarpiece, a 15th-century painting by Hubert and Jan Van Eyck in St. Bavo's Cathedral.

In the 19th century Ghent's most famous architect, Louis Roelandt, built the university hall Aula, the opera house, and the main courthouse. Highlights of modern architecture are the university buildings (the Boekentoren or Book Tower) by Henry Van de Velde. There are also a few theatres from diverse periods.

The beguinages, as well as the belfry and adjacent cloth hall, were recognized by UNESCO as World Heritage Sites in 1998 and 1999.

The Zebrastraat, a social experiment in which an entirely renovated site unites living, economy, and culture, can also be found in Ghent.

Campo Santo is a famous Catholic burial site of the nobility and artists.

One of the more notable pieces of contemporary architecture in Ghent is De Krook, the new central library and media center, a collaboration between local firm Coussée and Goris and Catalan firm RCR Arquitectos.

=== Museums ===
Important museums in Ghent are the Museum voor Schone Kunsten (Museum of Fine Arts), with paintings by Hieronymus Bosch, Peter Paul Rubens, and many Flemish masters; the SMAK or Stedelijk Museum voor Actuele Kunst (City Museum for Contemporary Art), with works of the 20th century, including Joseph Beuys and Andy Warhol; and the Design Museum Gent with masterpieces of Victor Horta and Le Corbusier. The Huis van Alijn (House of the Alijn family) was originally a beguinage and is now a museum for folk art where theatre and puppet shows for children are presented. The Museum voor Industriële Archeologie en Textiel or MIAT displays the industrial strength of Ghent with recreations of workshops and stores from the 1800s and original spinning and weaving machines that remain from the time when the building was a weaving mill. The Ghent City Museum (Stadsmuseum, abbreviated STAM), is committed to recording and explaining the city's past and its inhabitants, and to preserving the present for future generations.

=== Theatre ===
NTGent is the city theatre of Ghent, a public institution known for its radical productions. The theatre company's home base is in the Royal Dutch Theatre (Koninklijke Nederlandse Schouwburg, or KNS), with a secondary location in the city at Minnemeers. The company also tours extensively.

=== Restaurants and culinary traditions ===
In Ghent and other regions of East Flanders, bakeries sell a donut-shaped bun called a "mastel" (plural "mastellen"), which is basically a bagel. "Mastellen" are also called "Saint Hubert bread", because, on the Saint's feast day, which is 3 November, the bakers bring their batches to the early Mass to be blessed. Traditionally, it was thought that blessed mastellen immunized against rabies.

The first location of what later became the Leonidas praline chocolate chain was in Ghent. Local delicacies include cuberdons (also known as 'neuzekes') ('noses'), which are cone-shaped purple jelly-filled candies (a four-year feud between two local vendors made international news), 'babelutten' ('babblers'), hard butterscotch candies and 'Tierenteyna', spicy local mustard similar to French 'Dijon' mustard.

Stoverij is a classic Flemish meat stew, preferably made with a generous addition of brown 'Trappist' (strong abbey beer) and served with French fries. 'Waterzooi' is a local stew originally made from freshwater fish caught in the rivers and creeks of Ghent, but nowadays often made with chicken instead of fish. It is usually served nouvelle-cuisine-style and supplemented by a large pot on the side.

The city promotes a meat-free day on Thursdays called Donderdag Veggiedag with vegetarian food being promoted in public canteens for civil servants and elected councillors, in all city-funded schools, and promotion of vegetarian eating options in town (through the distribution of "veggie street maps"). This campaign is linked to the recognition of the detrimental environmental effects of meat production, which the United Nations' Food and Agriculture Organization has established to represent nearly one-fifth of global greenhouse gas emissions.

Ghent has a very high number of vegetarian restaurants per capita.

=== Festivals and other events ===
The city is host to some big cultural events such as the Ghent Festival, the International Film Festival of Ghent (with the World Soundtrack Awards) and the Gent Festival van Vlaanderen. Also, every five years, lasting ten days in late April or early May, an extensive botanical exhibition (Gentse Floraliën) takes place in Flanders Expo in Ghent, attracting numerous visitors to the city.

The Ghent Festival (Gentse Feesten in Dutch) is an annual festival that lasts for ten days. It has been held for more than 50 years (since 1969) and is attended by about 1–1.5 million visitors. It did not take place in 2020 and 2021 due to the COVID-19 pandemic in Belgium, being held again in the summer of 2022, after a two-year break.

The Festival of Flanders had its 50th celebration in 2008. In Ghent, it opens with the OdeGand City festivities that take place on the second Saturday of September. Some 50 concerts take place in diverse locations throughout the medieval inner city and some 250 international artists perform.

Ghent has been chosen as the 2024 European Youth Capital by the European Youth Forum.

The Ghent Light Festival is a free, open-air festival of light art held in the city six times with attendance peaking at 835,000 in 2018.

=== Parks ===
The numerous parks in the city can also be considered tourist attractions. Most notably, Ghent boasts a nature reserve (Bourgoyen-Ossemeersen, 230 hectares (570 acres)) and a recreation park (Blaarmeersen, 87 hectares; 215 acres).

== Economy ==
The port of Ghent, in the north of the city, is the third-largest port of Belgium. It is accessed by the Ghent–Terneuzen Canal, which ends near the Dutch port of Terneuzen on the Western Scheldt. The port houses, among others, large companies like ArcelorMittal, Volvo Cars, Volvo Trucks, Volvo Parts, Honda, Yamaha Motor and Stora Enso.

Ghent University and several research-oriented companies, such as Ablynx, Innogenetics, Cropdesign, and Bayer Cropscience, are situated in the central and southern part of the city.

As the largest city in East Flanders, Ghent has four large hospitals, numerous schools, and shopping streets. Flanders Expo, the biggest event hall in Flanders and the second biggest in Belgium, is also located in Ghent. Tourism is becoming a major employer in the local area.

== Transport ==
As one of the largest cities in Belgium, Ghent has a highly developed transport system.

=== Road ===
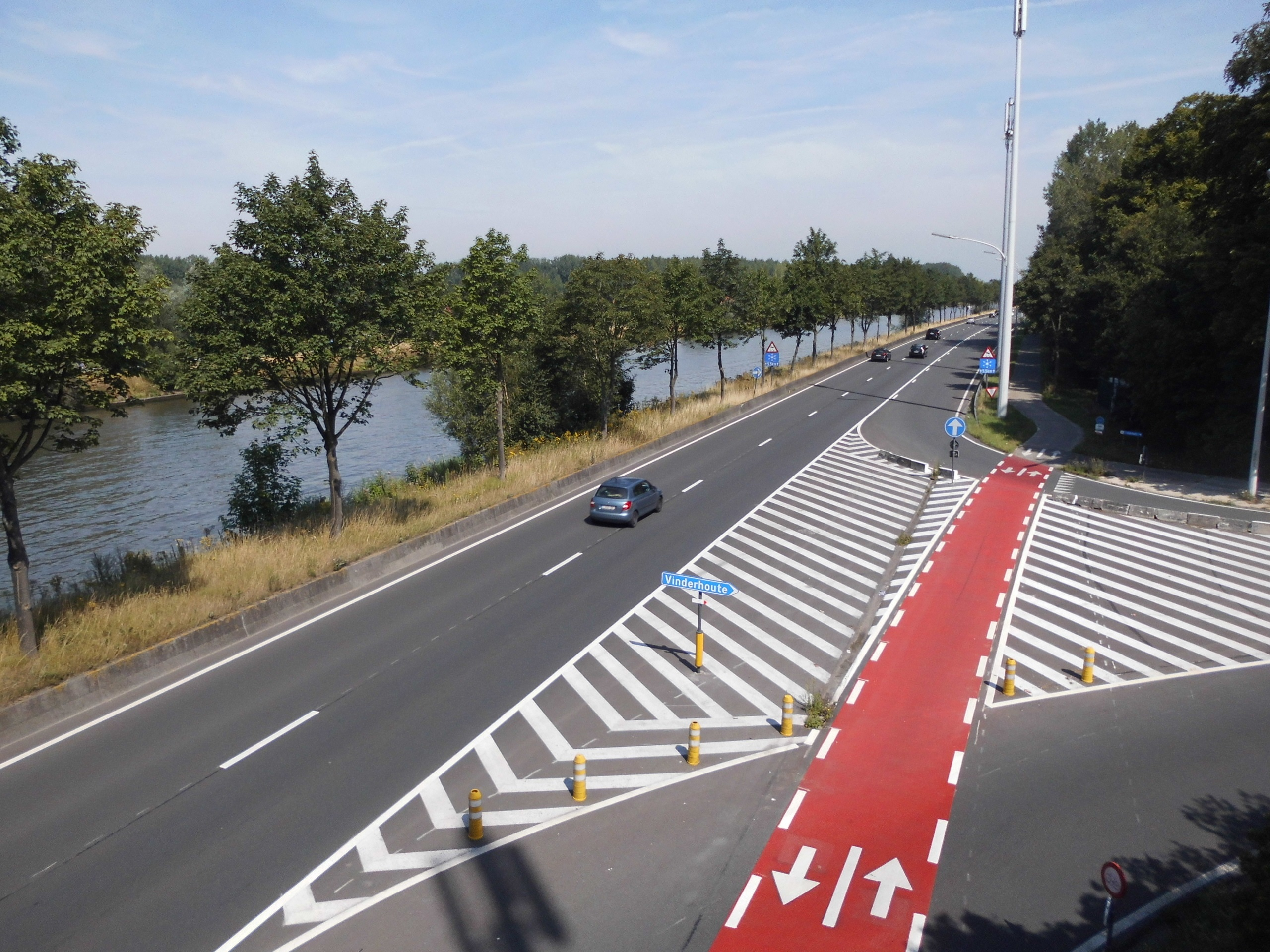
The R4 ringroad

By car the city is accessible via two motorways:

- The E40 connects Ghent with Bruges and Ostend to the west, and with Brussels, Leuven and Liège to the east.
- The E17 connects Ghent with Sint-Niklaas and Antwerp to the north, and with Kortrijk and Lille to the south.

In addition, Ghent also has two ringways:

- The R4 connects the outskirts of Ghent with each other and the surrounding villages, and also leads to the E40 and E17 roads.
- The R40 connects the different downtown quarters with each other and provides access to the main avenues.

=== Rail ===
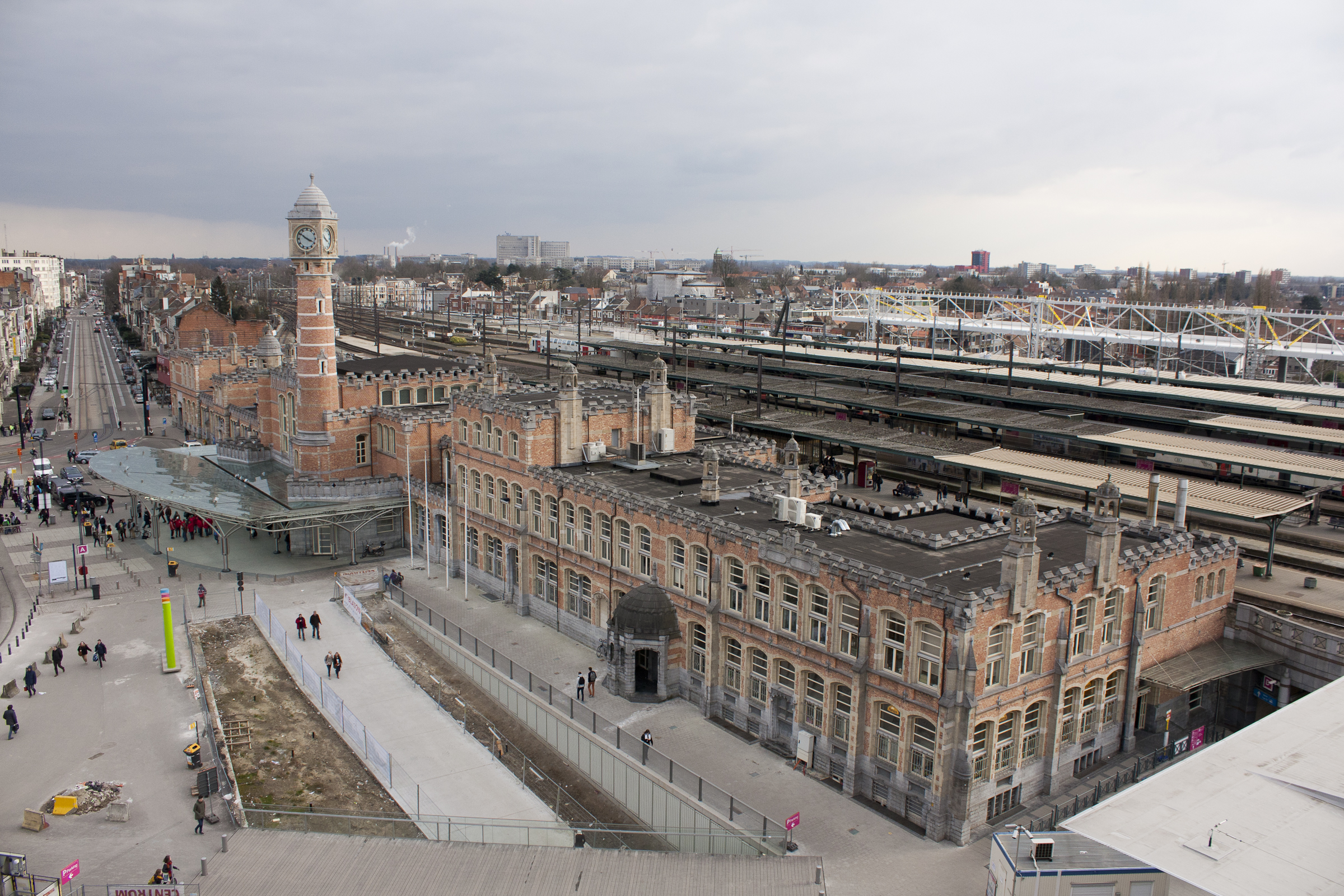
Gent-Sint-Pieters railway station, Ghent

Five railway stations can be found in the municipality of Ghent:

- Gent-Sint-Pieters Station: an international railway station with connections to Bruges, Brussels, Antwerp, Kortrijk, other Belgian towns, and Lille. The station also offers a direct connection to Brussels Airport.
- Gent-Dampoort Station: an intercity railway station with connections to Sint-Niklaas, Antwerp, Kortrijk and Eeklo.
- Gentbrugge Station: a regional railway station in between the two main railway stations, Sint-Pieters and Dampoort.
- Wondelgem Station: a regional railway station with connections to Eeklo once an hour.
- Drongen Station: a regional railway station in the village of Drongen with connections to Bruges once an hour.
- Gent-Zeehaven station: a regional railway station in the port of Ghent with connections to Gent-Sint-Pieters Station and the town of Terneuzen in The Netherlands.

=== Public transport ===
Ghent has an extensive network of public transport lines, operated by De Lijn.

==== Trams ====
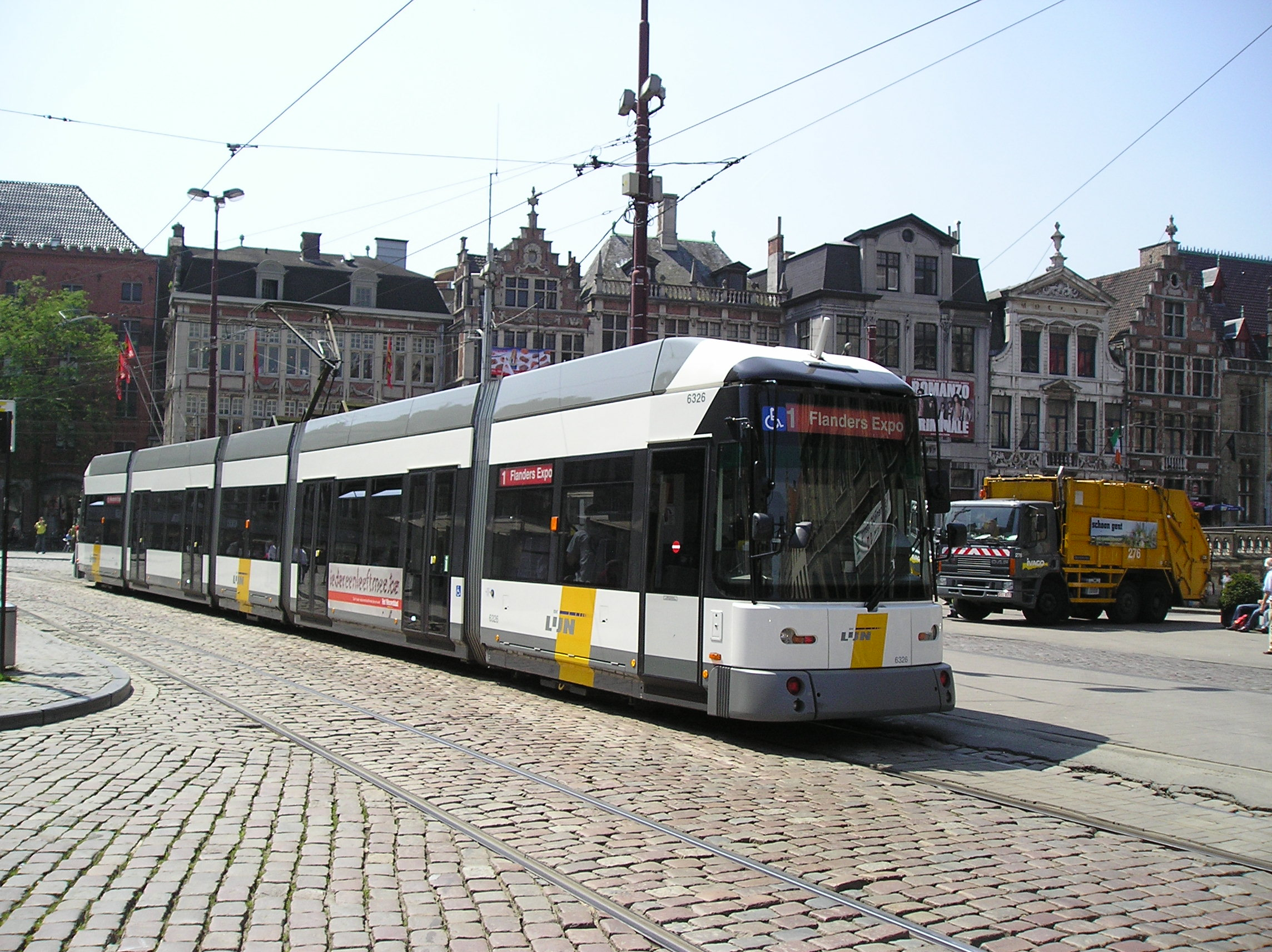
A HermeLijn low-floor tram in Ghent

Since 6/01/2024, the network contains 4 lines:

| Line | Route |
|---|---|
| T1 | Flanders Expo – Gent-Sint-Pieters railway station – Kouter – Zuid – Gentbrugge Stelplaats |
| T2 | Evergem;– Wondelgem – Korenmarkt – Zuid – Melle Leeuw |
| T3 | Zwijnaarde Bibliotheek – Gent-Sint-Pieters railway station – Kouter – Zuid – Moscou |
| T4 | Gent UZ – Gent-Sint-Pieters railway station – Rabot – Muide – Lange Steenstraat |

Before 6/01/2024, the network contained 3 lines:

- Line 1: Flanders Expo – Sint-Pieters-Station – Korenmarkt (city centre) – Wondelgem – Evergem
- Line 2: Zwijnaarde Bibliotheek – Sint-Pieters-Station – Zonnestraat (city centre) – Brabantdam – Zuid – Melle Leeuw (fuse of line 21 and 22 as of May 2017)
- Line 4: UZ – Sint-Pieters-Station – Muide – Korenmarkt (city centre) – Zuid – Moscou
- Line 21: Zwijnaarde Bibliotheek – Sint-Pieters-Station – Zonnestraat (city centre) – Zuid – Melle Leeuw (fused into line 2)
- Line 22: Kouter – Bijlokehof – Sint-Pieters-Station – Zonnestraat (city centre) – Zuid – Gentbrugge (fused into line 2)

==== Buses ====
Since 6/01/2024, the city bus network contains 11 lines:

- Line 5a: Nieuw Gent – Heuvelpoort - Zuid - Sint-Jacobs - Van Beverenplein - Wondelgem Station
- Line 5b: Nieuw Gent – Heuvelpoort - Zuid - Sint-Jacobs - Meulestede (- Wondelgem Station, not serviced until 2026 due to road works)
- Line 6: P+R Muide – Sint-Jacobs - Zuid
- Line 9a: Gentbrugge – Ledeberg - Sint-Pieters railway station - Malem - Mariakerke (Kolegem) - Wondelgem Station
- Line 9b: Gentbrugge – Ledeberg - Sint-Pieters railway station - Malem - Mariakerke (Center) - Wondelgem Station
- Line 10: Mariakerke – Korenmarkt - Sint-Jacobs - Dampoort - Snellaertplein
- Line 11: Gentbrugge - Dampoort - Sint-Jacobs - Korenmarkt - Blaarmeersen
- Line 12a: Achtendries - Dampoort - Sint-Jacobs - Korenmarkt - Drongen - Leerne
- Line 12b: Oostakker – Dampoort - Sint-Jacobs - Korenmarkt - Drongen Varendries
- Line 16: Zuid - Sint-Baafskouter
- Line 19: Arteveldestadion – Sint-Pieters railway station - Blaarmeersen

Before 6/01/2024, the city bus network contained 9 lines:

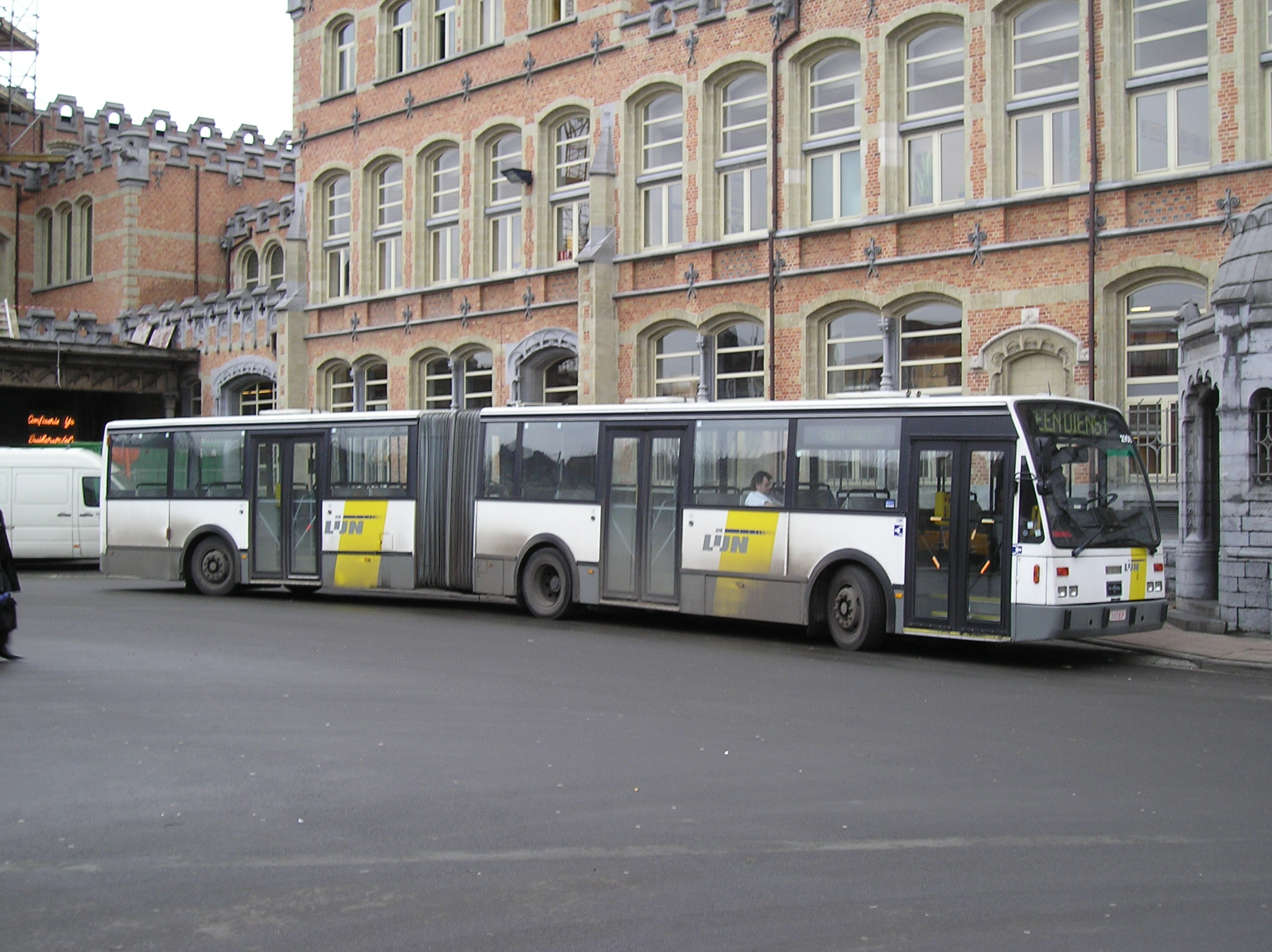
A Van Hool articulated bus in Ghent

- Line 3: Mariakerke – Korenmarkt (city centre) – Dampoort – Gentbrugge (formerly a trolleybus line; see picture below)
- Line 5: Van Beverenplein – Sint-Jacobs (city centre) – Zuid – Heuvelpoort – Nieuw-Gent
- Line 6: Watersportbaan – Zuid – Dampoort – Meulestede – Wondelgem – Mariakerke
- Line 8: AZ Sint-Lucas – Sint-Jacobs (city centre) – Zuid – Heuvelpoort – Arteveldepark
- Line 9: Mariakerke – Malem – Sint-Pieters-Station – Ledeberg – Gentbrugge
- Line 17/18: Drongen – Malem – Korenmarkt (city centre) – Dampoort – Oostakker
- Line 38/39: Blaarmeersen – Ekkergem – Korenmarkt (city centre) – Dampoort – Sint-Amandsberg

Apart from the city buses mentioned above, Ghent also has numerous regional bus lines connecting it to towns and villages across the province of East Flanders. All of these buses stop in at least one of the city's regional bus hubs at either Sint-Pieters Station, Dampoort Station, Zuid or Rabot.

International buses connecting Ghent to other European destinations are usually found at the Dampoort Station. A couple of private bus companies such as Eurolines, Megabus and Flixbus operate from the Dampoort bus hub.

Buses to and from Belgium's first (Brussels Airport) and second airport (Brussels South Charleroi Airport) are operated by Flibco, and can be found at the rear exit of the Sint-Pieters Station.

=== Cycling ===
Ghent has the largest designated cyclist area in Europe, with nearly 400 kilometres (250 mi) of cycle paths and more than 700 one-way streets, where bikes are allowed to go against the traffic. It also boasts Belgium's first bicycle boulevard, where cars are considered 'guests' and must stay behind cyclists. In 2013, it began doing on-street surveys of bicycles, adding bicycle parking racks in neighbourhoods where they were needed. In 2017, the city changed traffic circulation patterns to favour cycling. The switch was done over the course of a single weekend, changing traffic circulation on over 80 streets and 2500 road signs. It expanded the car-free zone in the historic city center more than twofold. It also put in radial barriers to car traffic, thus shifting it onto the inner ring road.

More cyclists means a higher demand for bicycle parking stations. In 2010, the plans to renovate Gent-Sint-Pieters railway station included 10,000 bicycle parking spots. In 2020, several sections of the underground parking facilities have been built, and the targets have been adjusted to a total of 17,000 parking spots.

== Sports ==
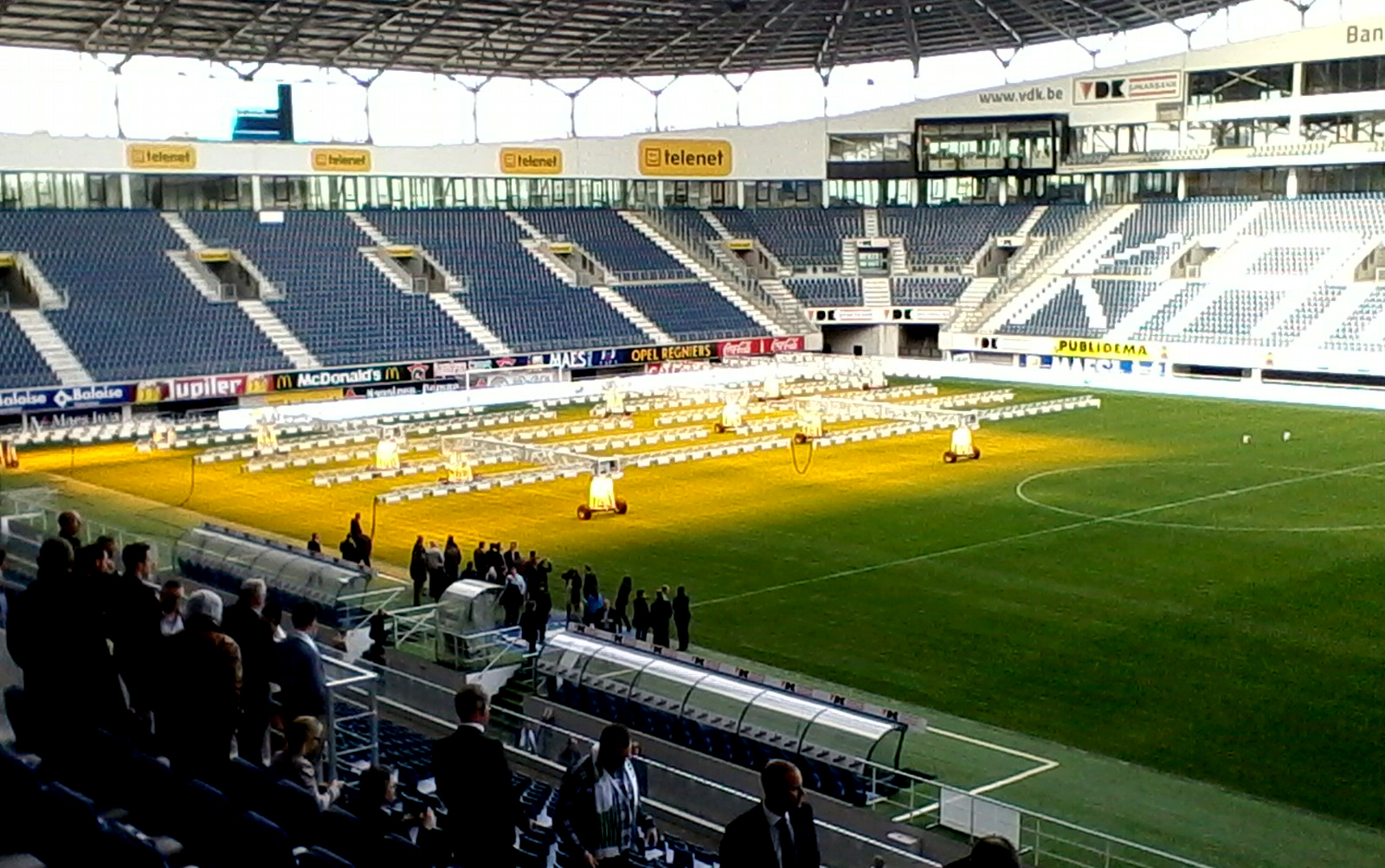
Planet Group Arena

In the Belgian first football division Ghent is represented by K.A.A. Gent, who became Belgian football champions for the first time in its history in 2015. Another Ghent football club is KRC Gent-Zeehaven, playing in the Belgian fourth division. A football match at the 1920 Summer Olympics was held in Ghent.

The Six Days of Ghent, a six-day track cycling race, is held annually, taking place in the Kuipke velodrome in Ghent. In road cycling, the city hosts the start and finish of the Omloop Het Nieuwsblad, the traditional opening race of the cobbled classics season. It also lends its name to another cobbled classic, Gent–Wevelgem, although the race now starts in the nearby city of Deinze.

The city hosts an annual athletics IAAF event in the Flanders Sports Arena: the Indoor Flanders meeting where two-time Olympic champion Hicham El Guerrouj set an indoor world record of 3:48.45 in the mile run in 1997.

The Flanders Sports Arena was host to the 2015 Davis Cup Final between Belgium and Great Britain.

In March, the city hosts the annual Ghent Marathon. The 2026 edition had 18,000 participants, between half marathon and marathon.

== Notable people ==
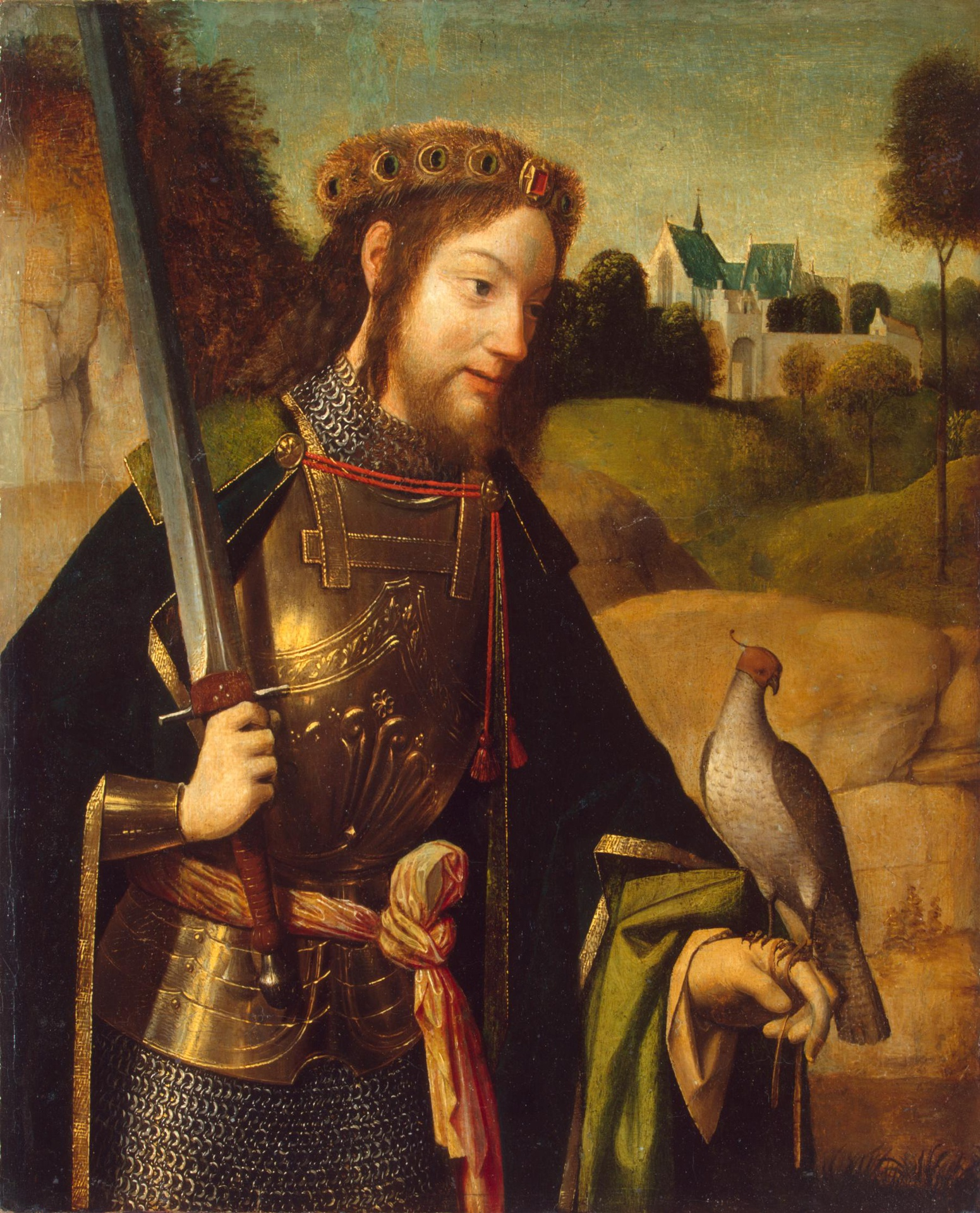
Saint Bavo, patron saint of Ghent

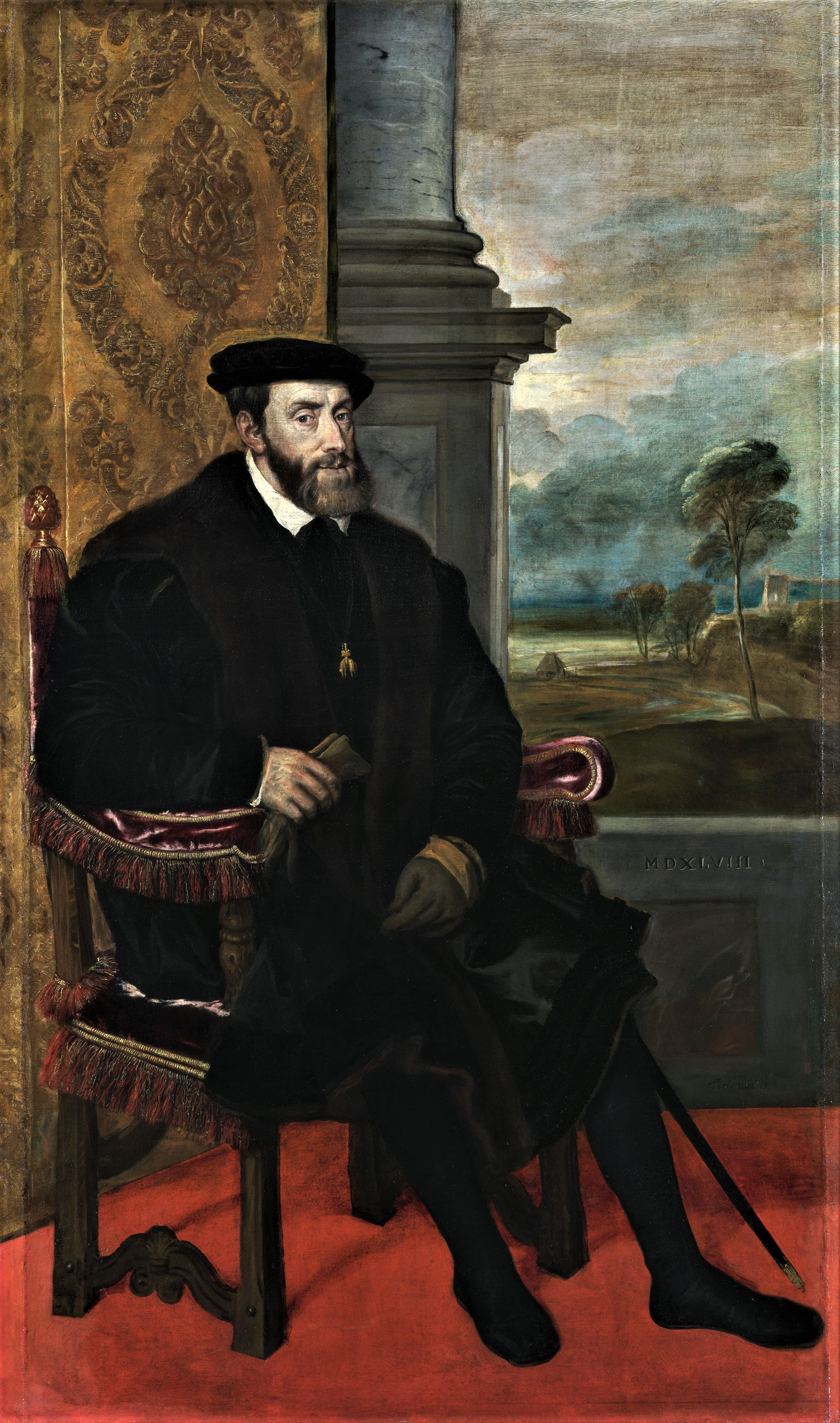
Emperor Charles V was born in Ghent in 1500

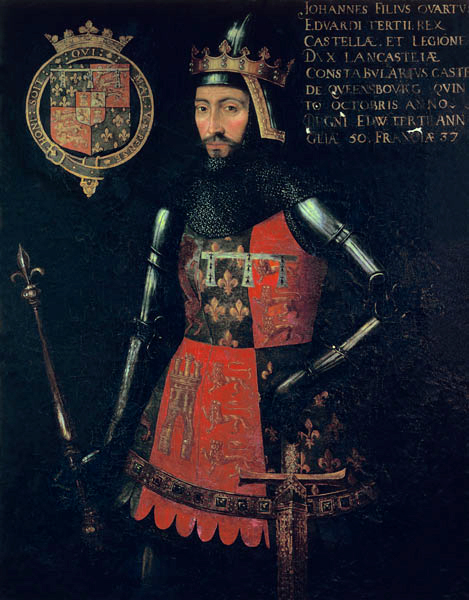
John of Gaunt, born in Ghent in 1340

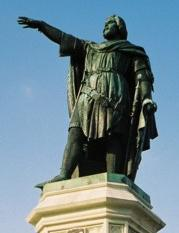
Statue of Jacob van Artevelde on the Vrijdagmarkt

- Frans Ackerman (c. 1330–1387), Flemish statesmen and military leader.
- Charles François Antoine Morren (c. 1807-1858), Belgian botanist and horticulturist
- Charlotte Adigéry (born c. 1995), Belgian-Caribbean musician
- Alexander Agricola (c. 1445–1506), Franco-Flemish composer of the Renaissance
- Leo Baekeland (1863–1944), chemist and inventor of Bakelite
- Saint Bavo (589–654), patron saint of Ghent
- Marthe Boël (1877–1956), feminist
- Josse Boutmy (1697–1779), composer, organist and harpsichordist
- Cornelius Canis (c. 1505–1562), composer, music director for the chapel of Charles V
- Charles V, Holy Roman Emperor (1500–1558), Karel V, Charles Quint.
- Willy De Clercq (1927–2011), liberal politician and European Commissioner
- Caspar de Crayer (1582–1669), painter
- Pedro de Gante (ca.1480–1572), Franciscan missionary in Mexico
- Frans de Potter (1834–1904), writer
- Emma De Vigne (1850–1898), painter
- Paul de Vigne (1843–1901), sculptor.
- De Vriendt brothers Juliaan Joseph (1842–1935), and Albrecht François Lieven (1843–1900), painters.
- Charlotte de Witte (born 1992), DJ and record producer
- Joseph Guislain (1797–1860), physician
- Daniel Heinsius (1580–1655), scholar of the Dutch Renaissance.
- Henry of Ghent (ca.1217–1293), scholastic philosopher.
- Corneille Jean François Heymans (1892–1968), physiologist and recipient of the Nobel Prize in Physiology or Medicine
- Victor Horta (1861–1947), Art Nouveau architect
- John of Gaunt (1340–1399), English royal prince, military leader and statesman.
- Suzanne Lilar (1901–1992), essayist, novelist, and playwright
- Saint Livinus of Ghent (580–657), saint and martyr
- Louis XVIII of France (1755–1824), was exiled in Ghent in 1815 during the Hundred Days.
- Pierre Louÿs (1870–1925), poet and romantic writer
- Maurice Maeterlinck (1862–1949), poet and playwright, won the Nobel Prize in Literature.
- Hippolyte Metdepenningen (1799–1881), lawyer and politician
- Gerard Mortier (born 1943), Belgian opera director
- Jacob Obrecht (ca.1457–1505), composer of the Renaissance
- Adolphe Quetelet (1796–1874), astronomer, mathematician, statistician and sociologist.
- Frans Rens (1805–1874), writer
- Gabriel Ríos (born 1978), musician
- Jacques Rogge, Belgian physician and eighth President of the International Olympic Committee, recipient of the UN Champions of the Earth Environmental Award
- Charles John Seghers (1839–1886), Jesuit clergyman and missionary
- Soulwax (formed 1995), electronic/rock band headed by David and Stephen Dewaele
- Jacob van Artevelde (ca.1290–1345), statesman and political leader.
- Gustave Van de Woestijne (1881–1947), painter
- Karel van de Woestijne (1878–1929), writer
- Hugo van der Goes (c. 1440–1482), painter.
- Théo van Rysselberghe (1862–1926), painter
- Geo Verbanck (1881–1961), sculptor
- Seppe Gebruers (born 1990), the first quartertone jazzpianist.
- Swen Vincke (born 1972), video game director and the head of Larian Studios.
- Jan Frans Willems (1793–1846), writer.

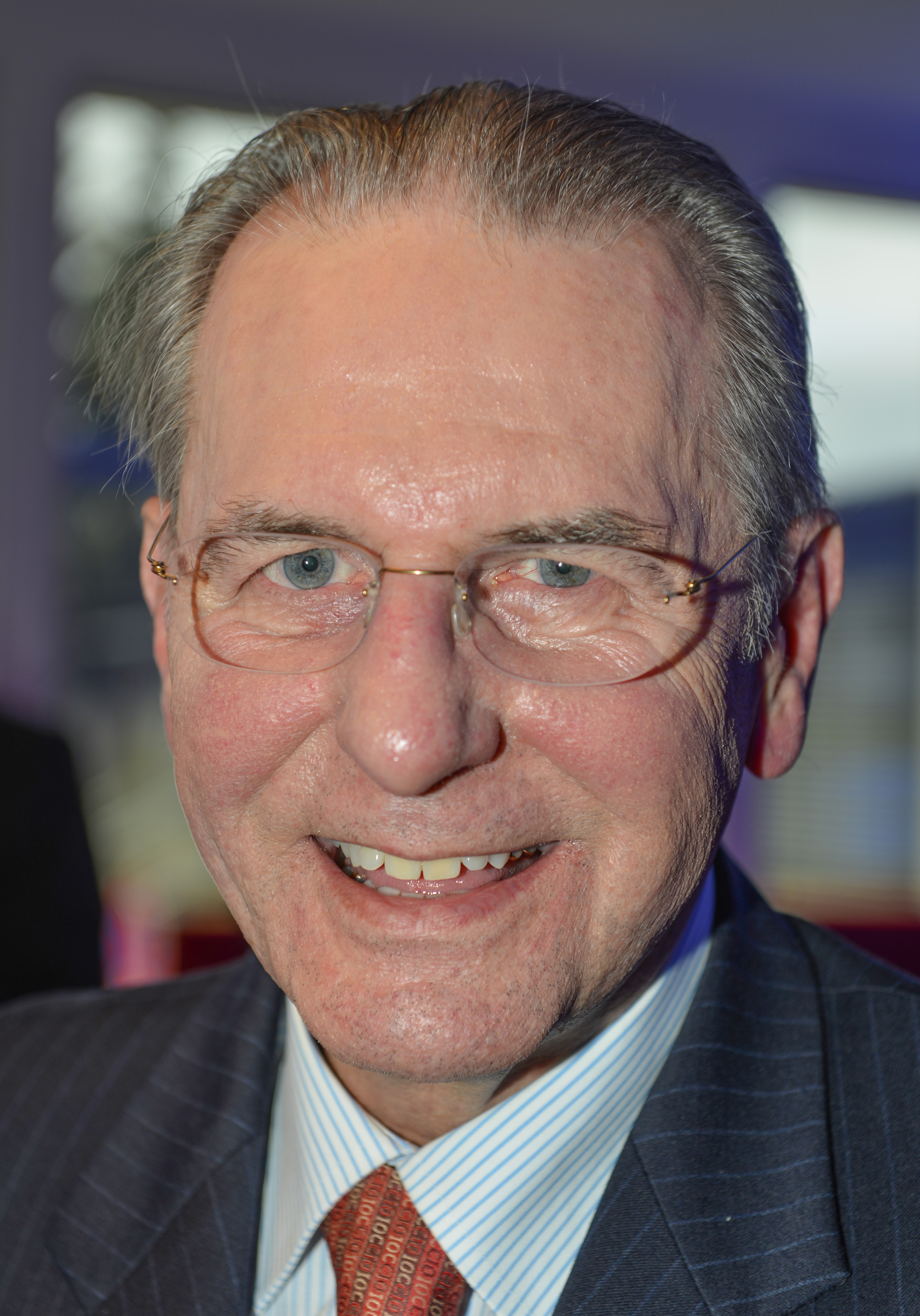
Jacques Rogge, 2014

=== Sport ===
- Tiesj Benoot (born 1994), cyclist
- Kevin De Bruyne (born 1991), professional footballer for SSC Napoli
- Xavier Henry (born 1991), shooting guard/small forward for the NBA's Los Angeles Lakers
- Gaelle Mys (born 1991), Olympic gymnast
- Jacques Rogge (1942–2021), former president of the IOC
- Patrick Sercu (1944–2019), Belgian track cyclist
- Cédric Van Branteghem (born 1979), athlete
- Bradley Wiggins (born 1980), British cyclist

== International relations ==
=== Twin towns – sister cities ===
Ghent was, up until 2021, twinned with 7 different cities (Saint-Raphaël in France, Wiesbaden and Melle in Germany, Kanazawa in Japan, Tallinn in Estonia, Mohammedia in Morocco and Nottingham in the United Kingdom), but decided to end its twinning with all of them with the exception of Kanazawa.

== Gallery ==
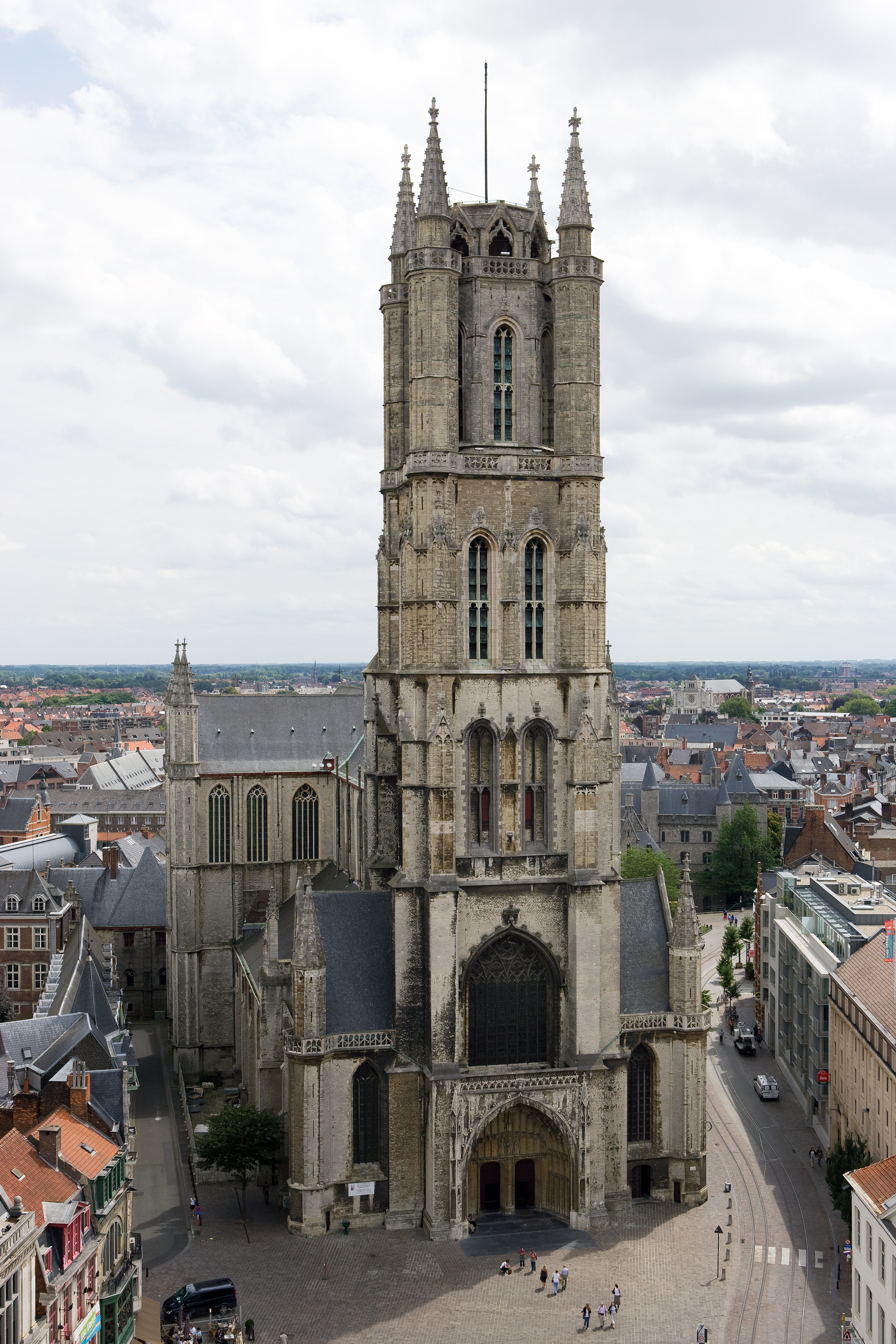
St. Bavo's Cathedral

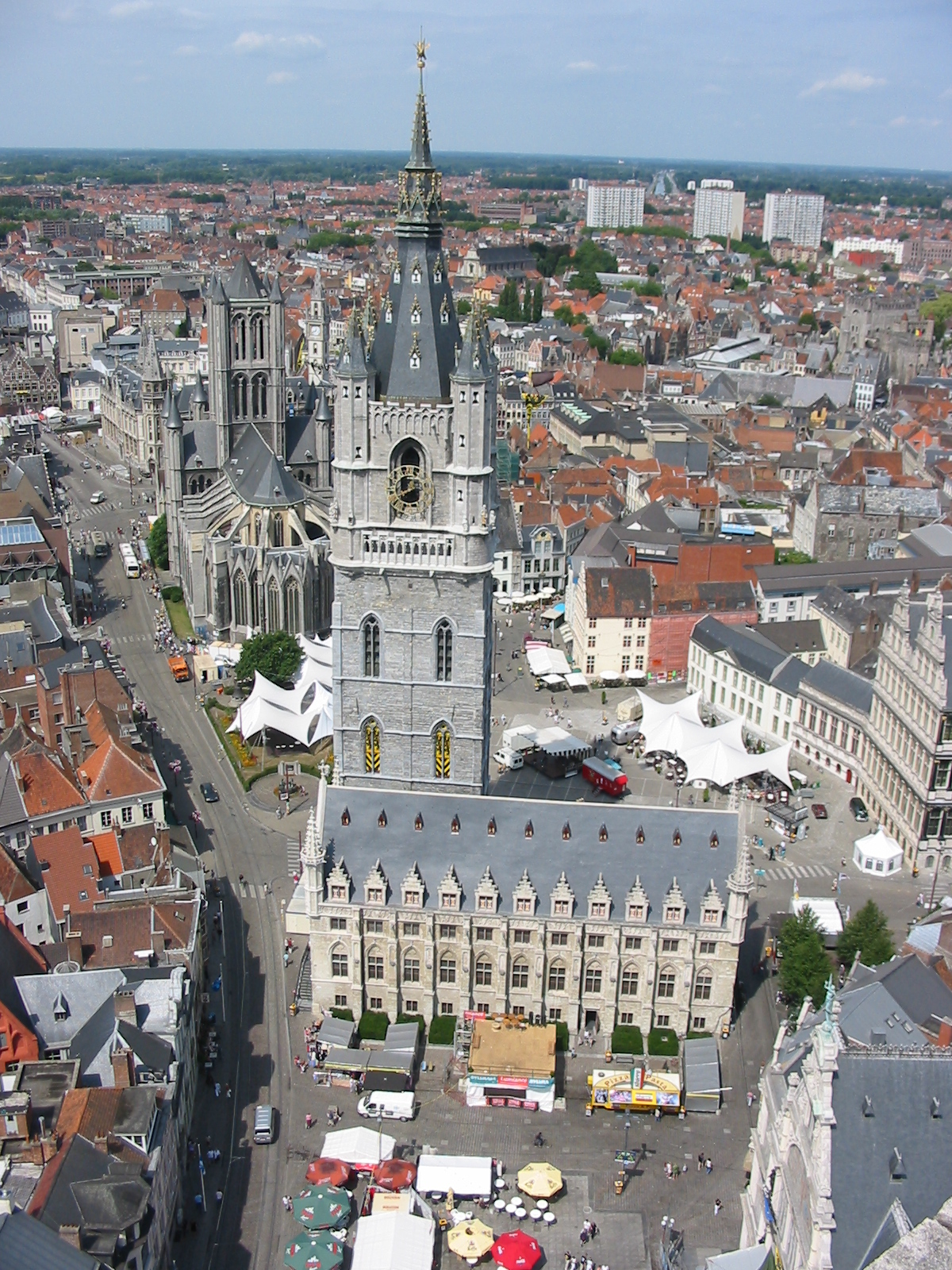
Belfry

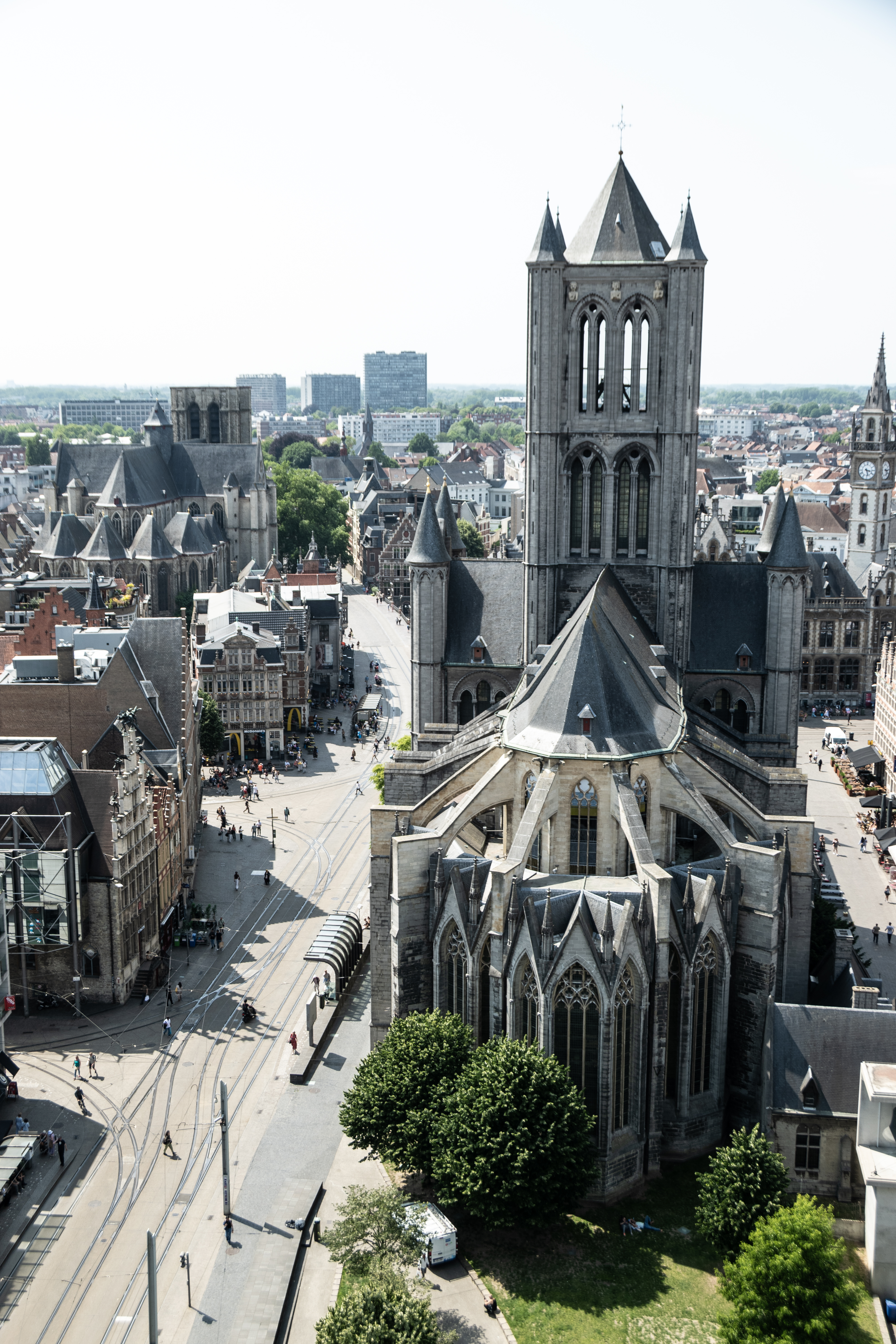
St. Nicholas Church

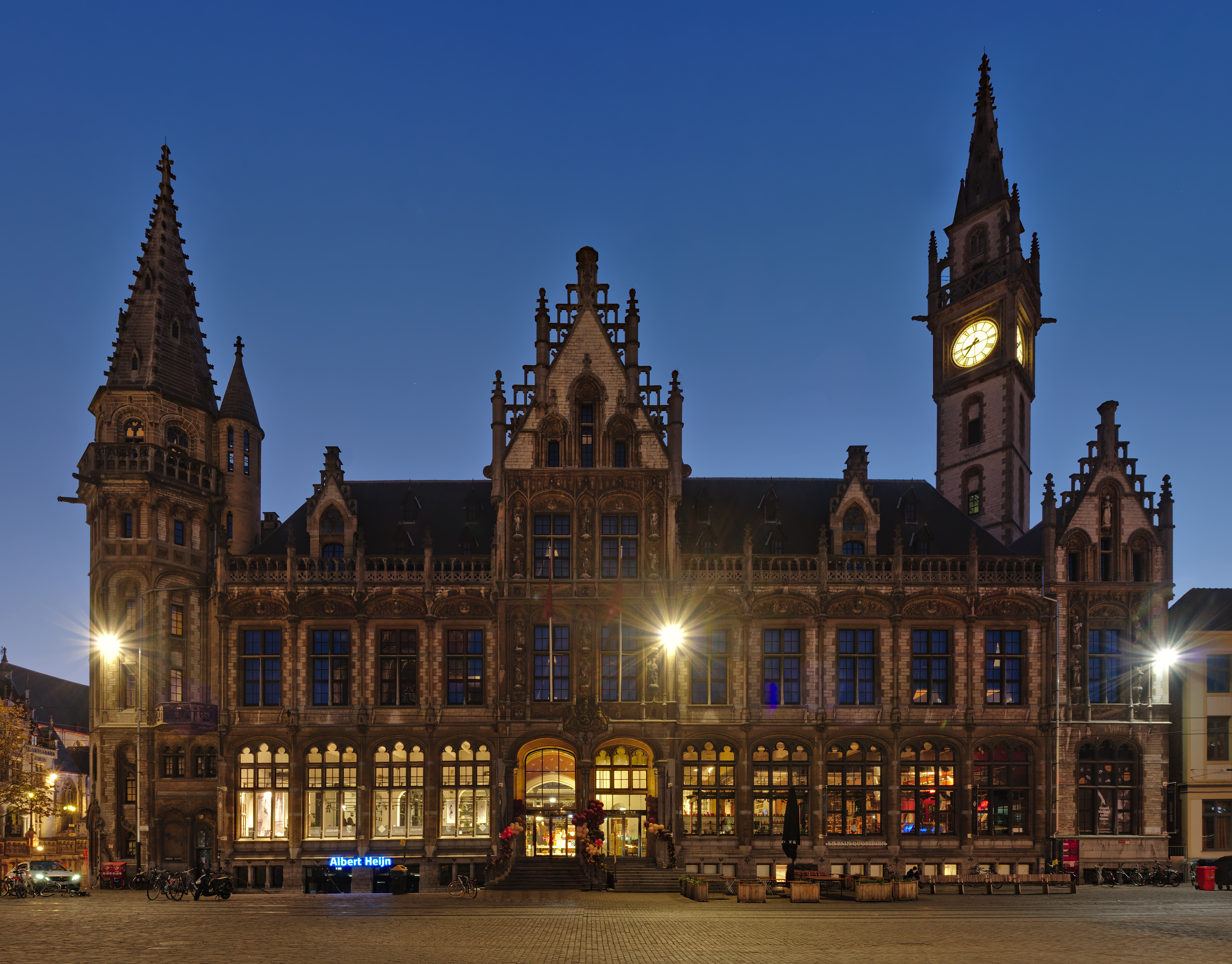
Old Post Office on the Korenmarkt

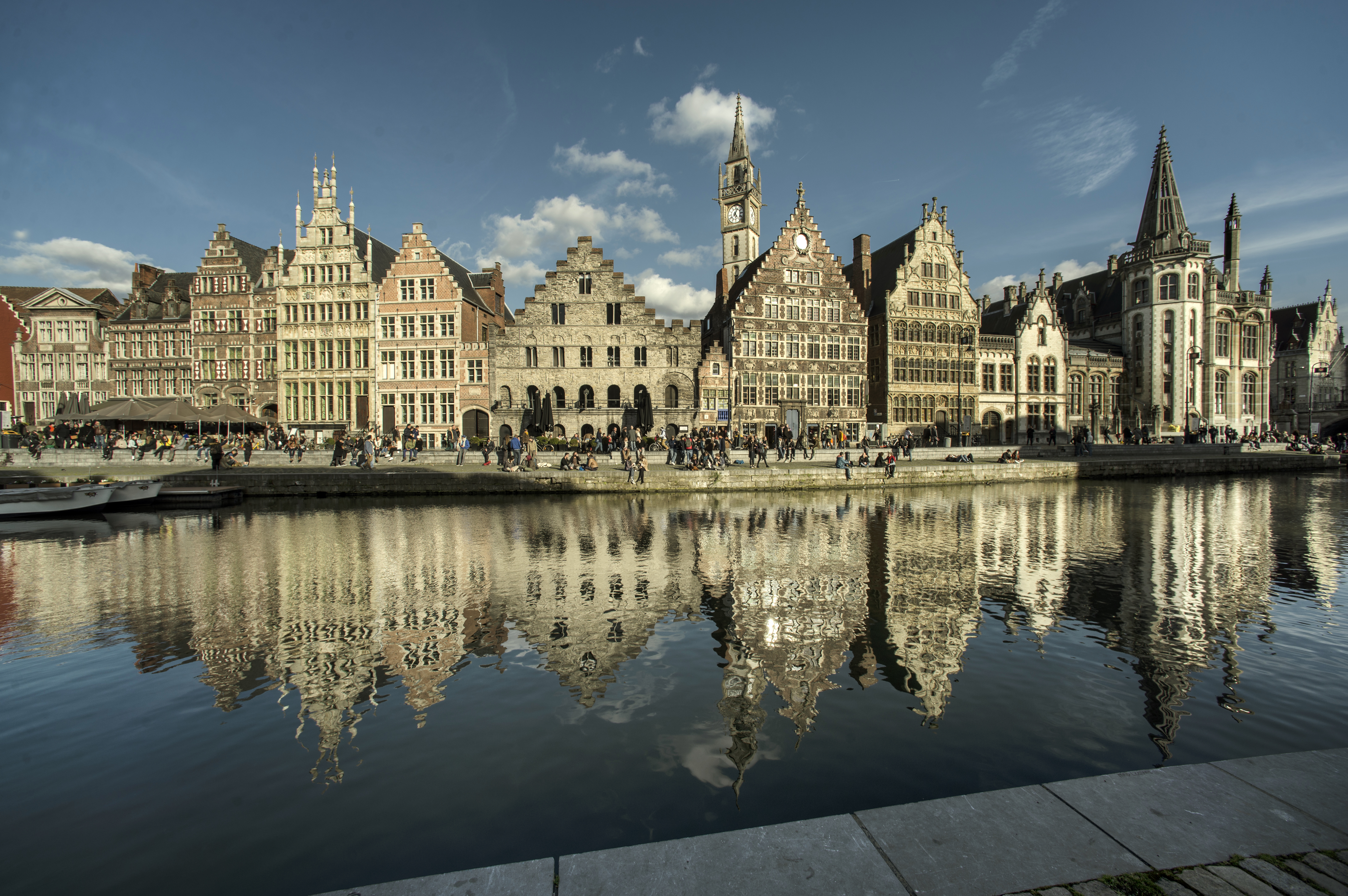
Graslei

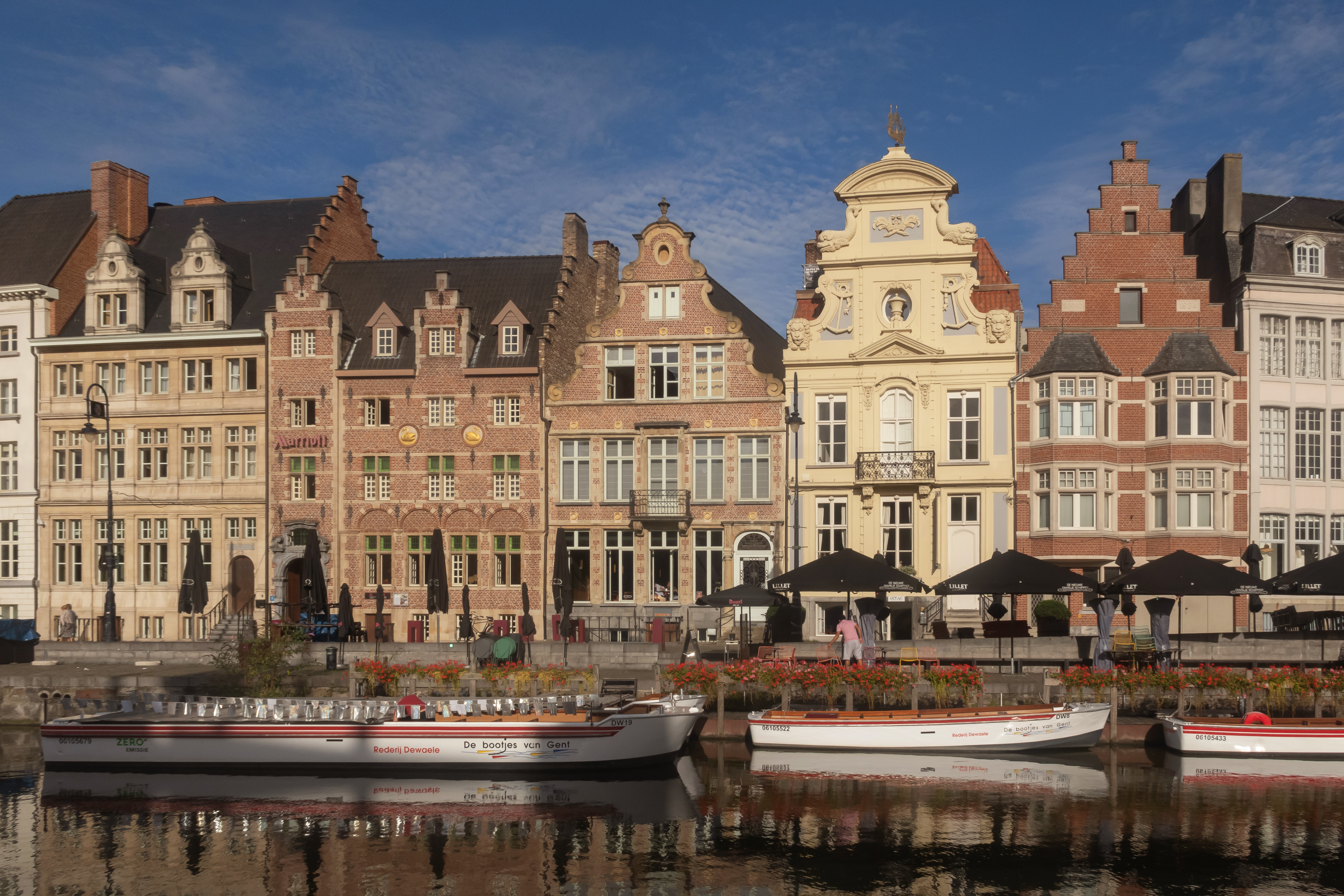
Korenlei

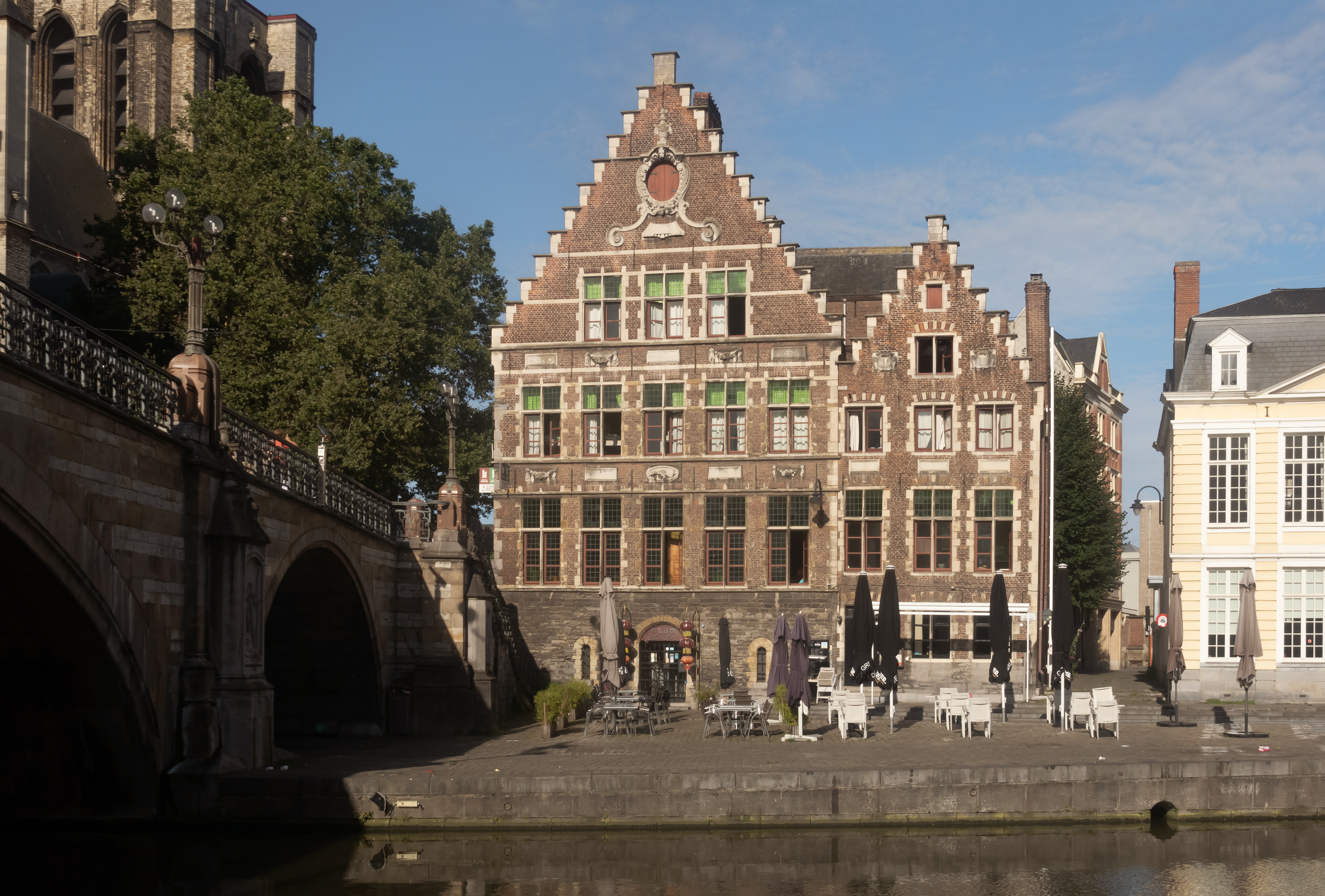
De Lingtworm en Krocht

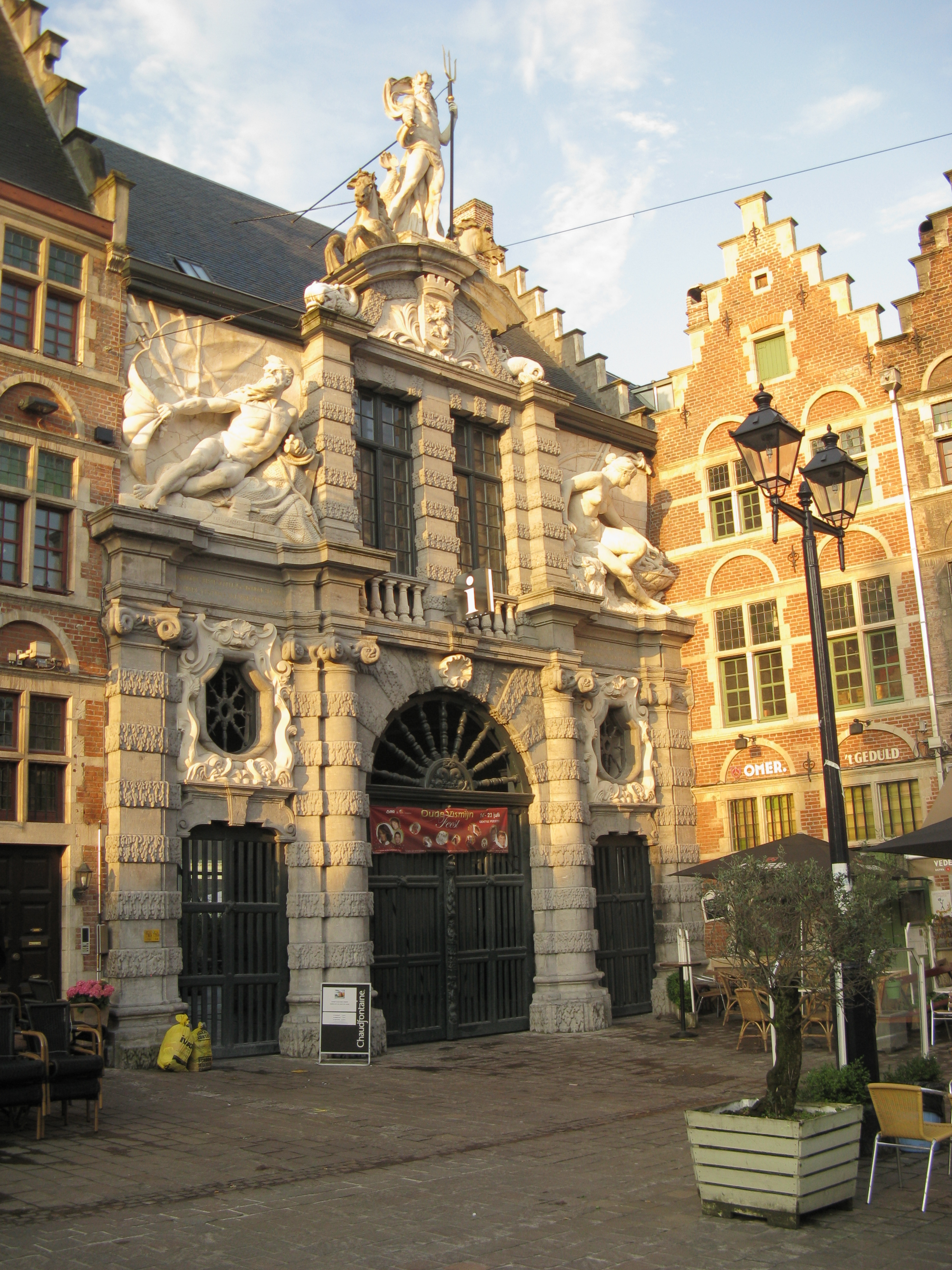
Entrance gate of Oude Vismijn ("Old Fish Market")

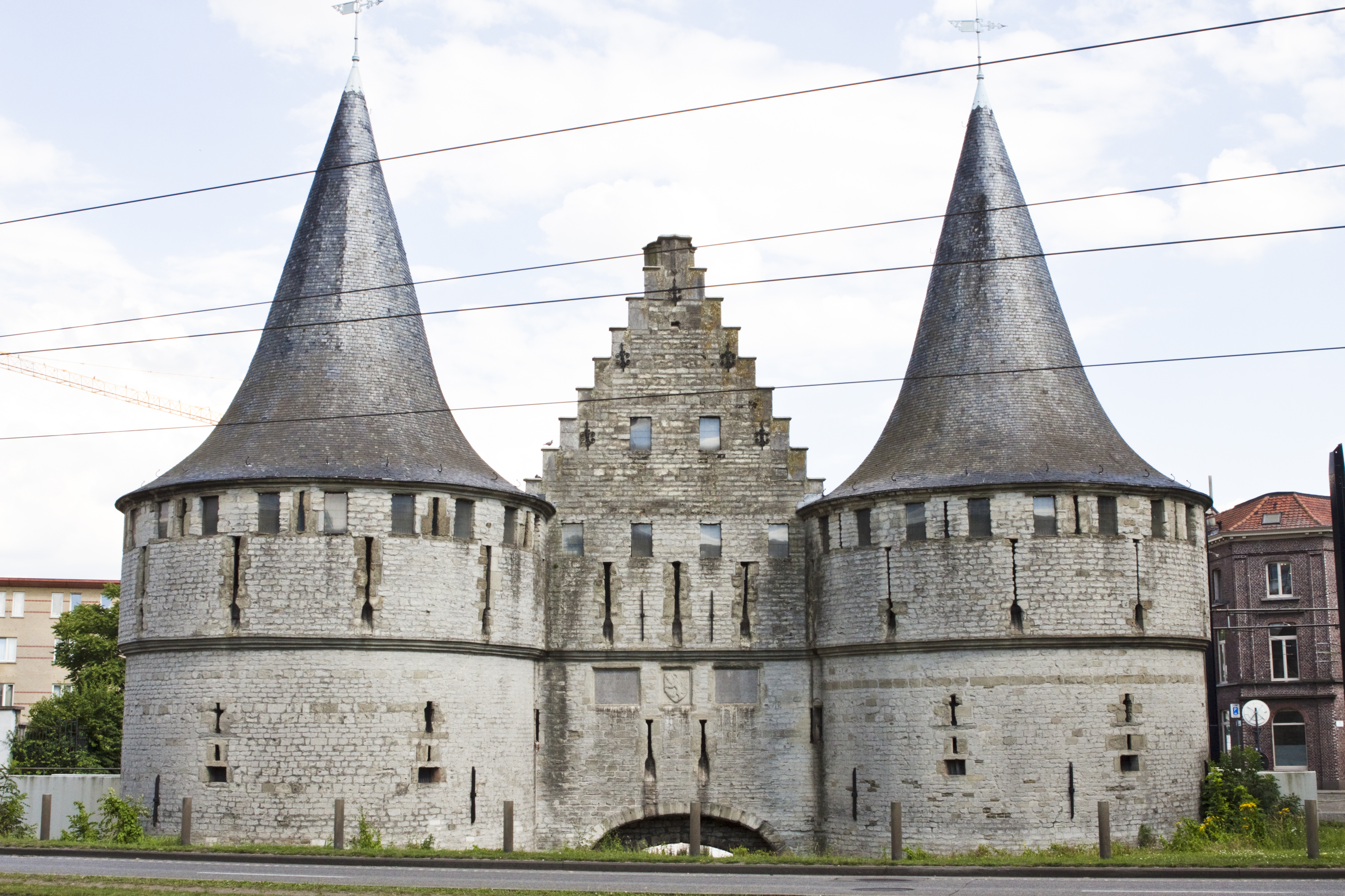
Rabot Gate

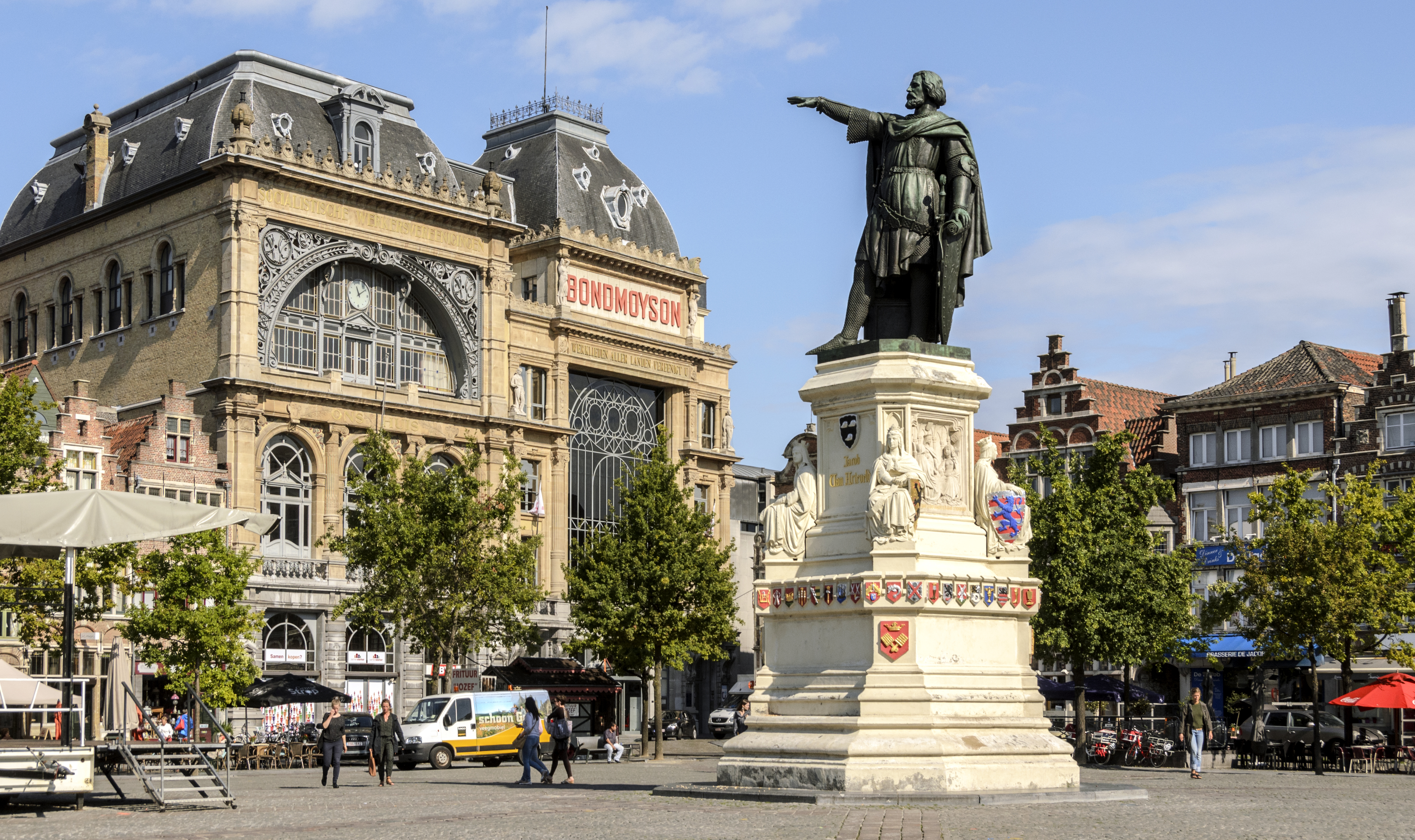
Vrijdagmarkt with statue of Jacob van Artevelde

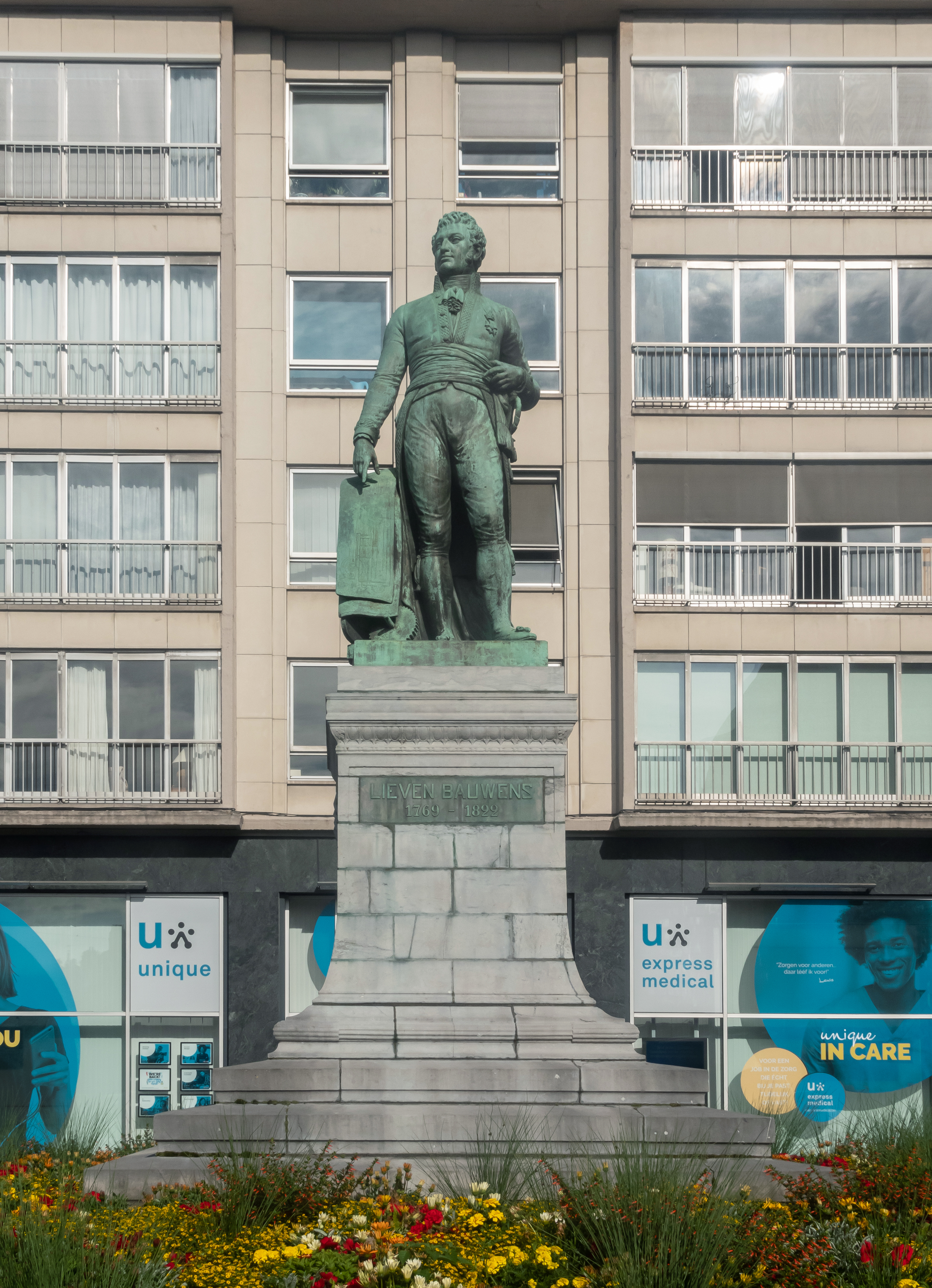
Statue Lieven Bauwens

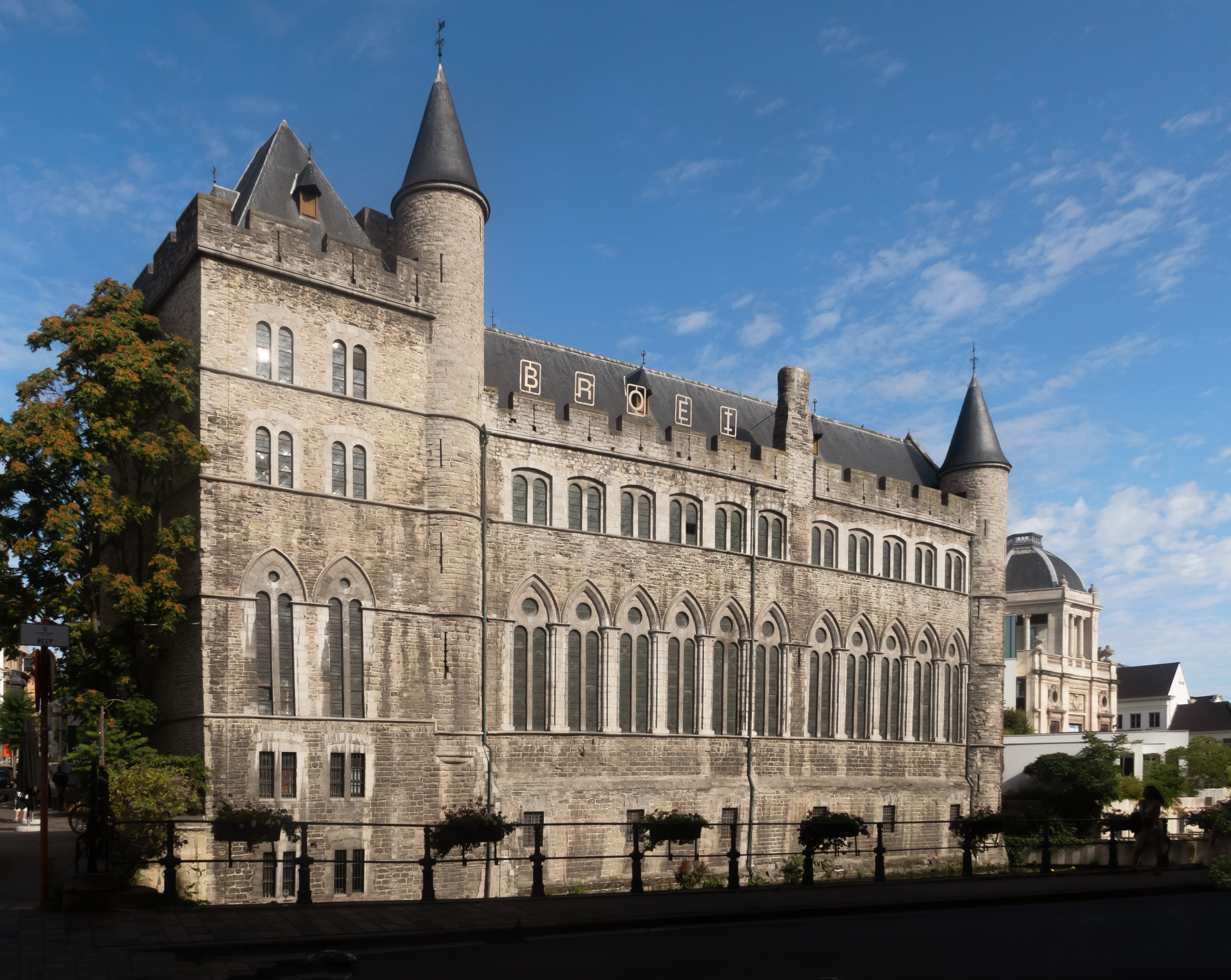
Geeraard de Duivelsteen

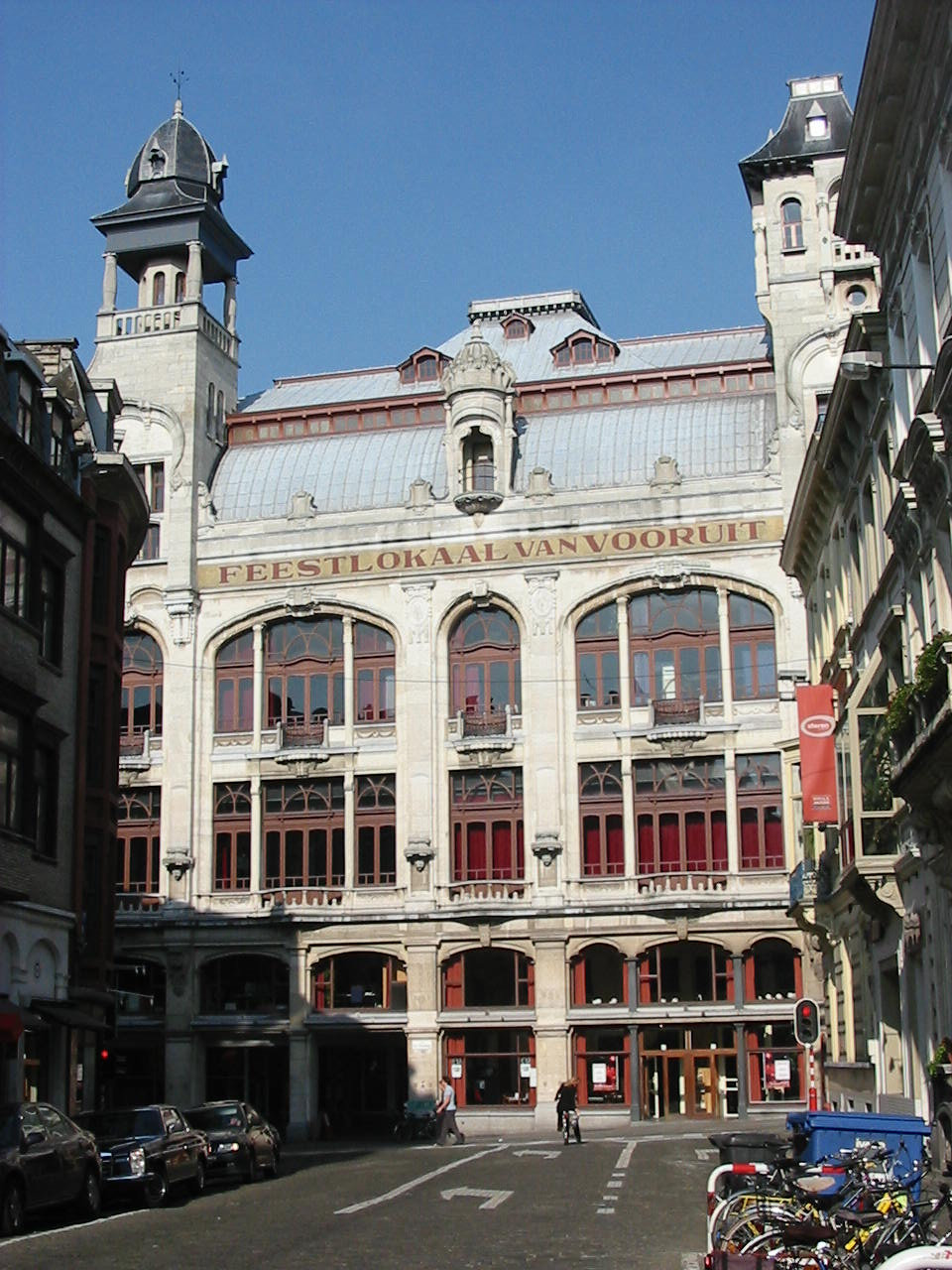
Vooruit Arts Center

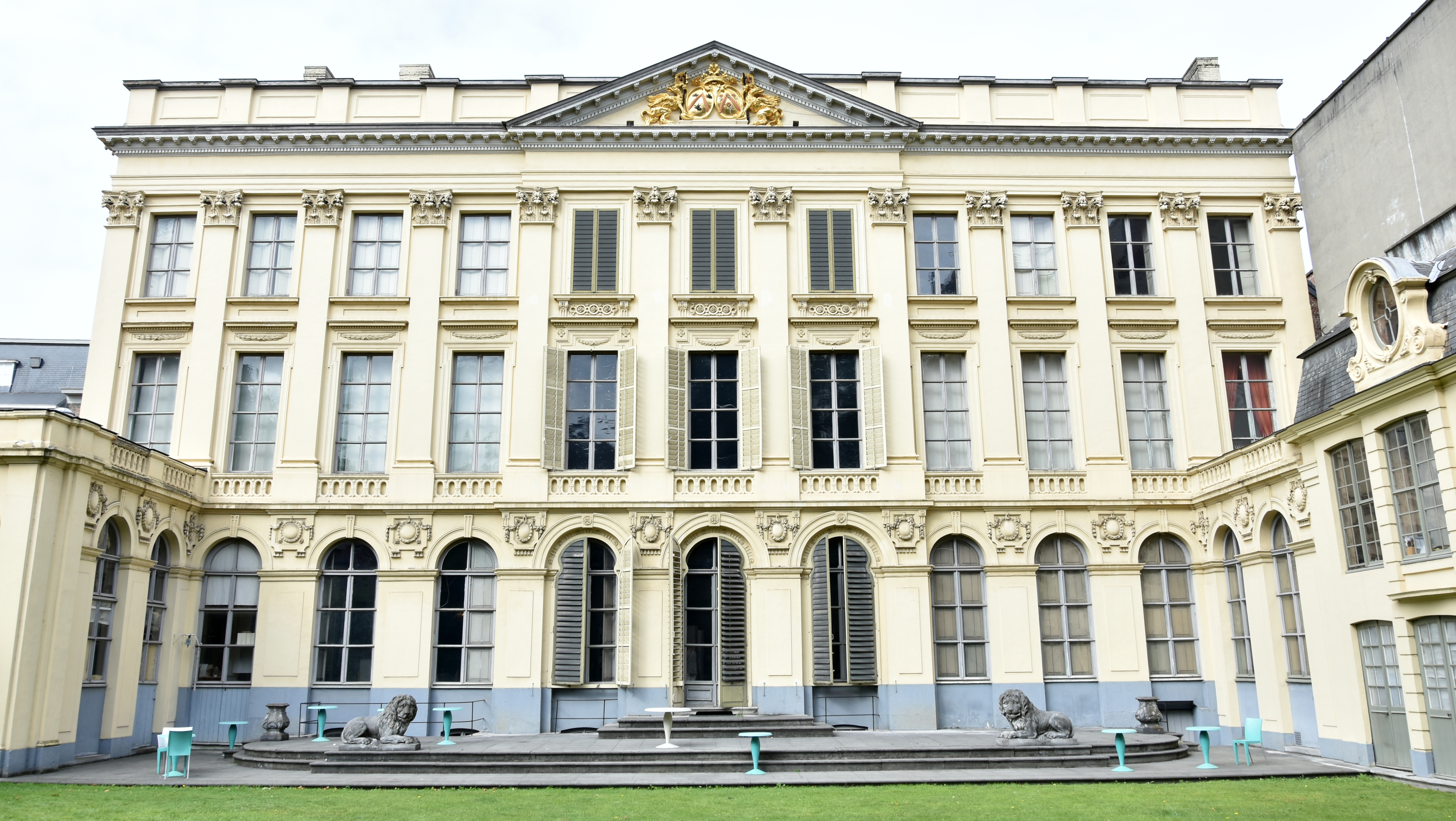
Hotel d'Hane-Steenhuyse

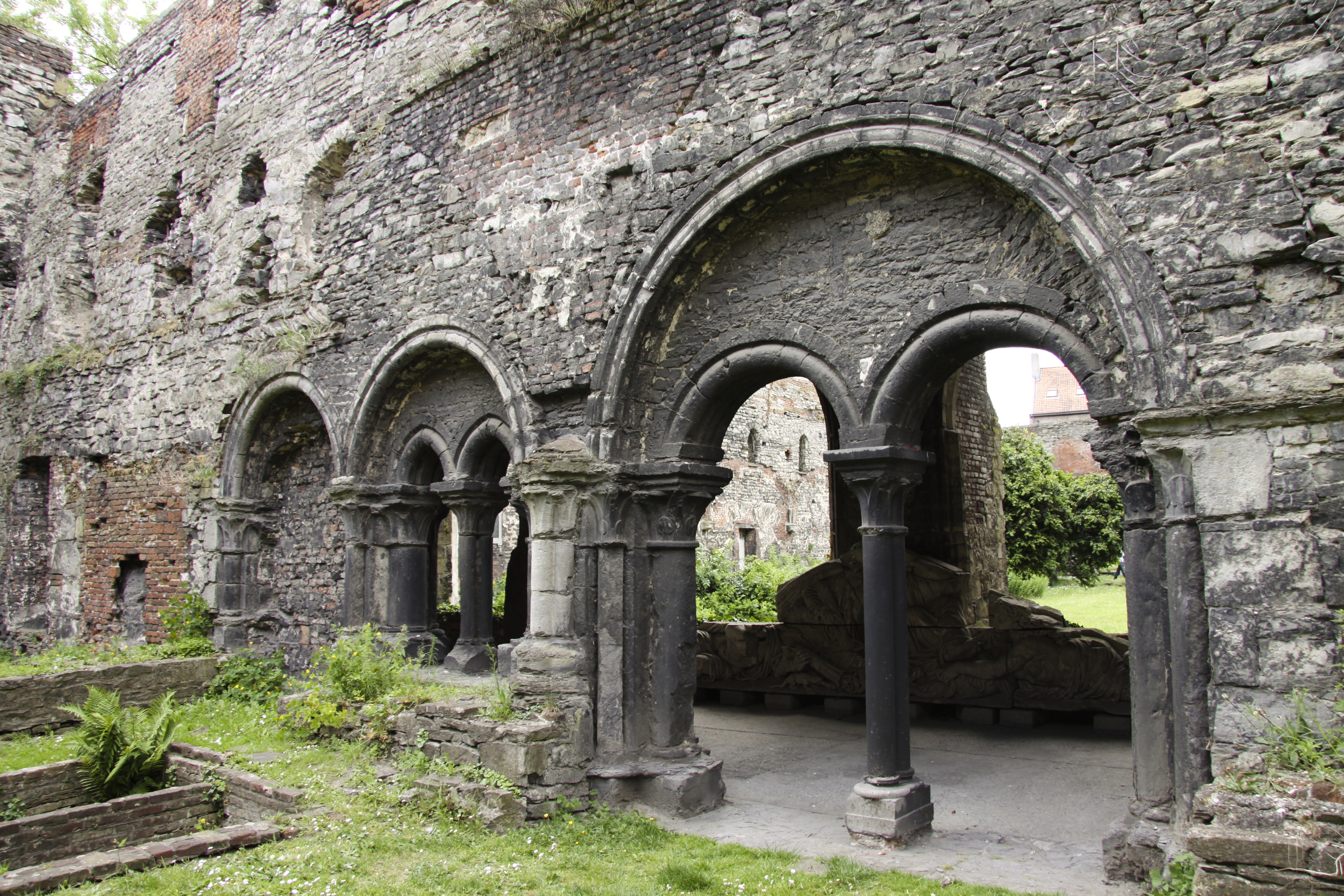
Ruins of St. Bavo's Abbey

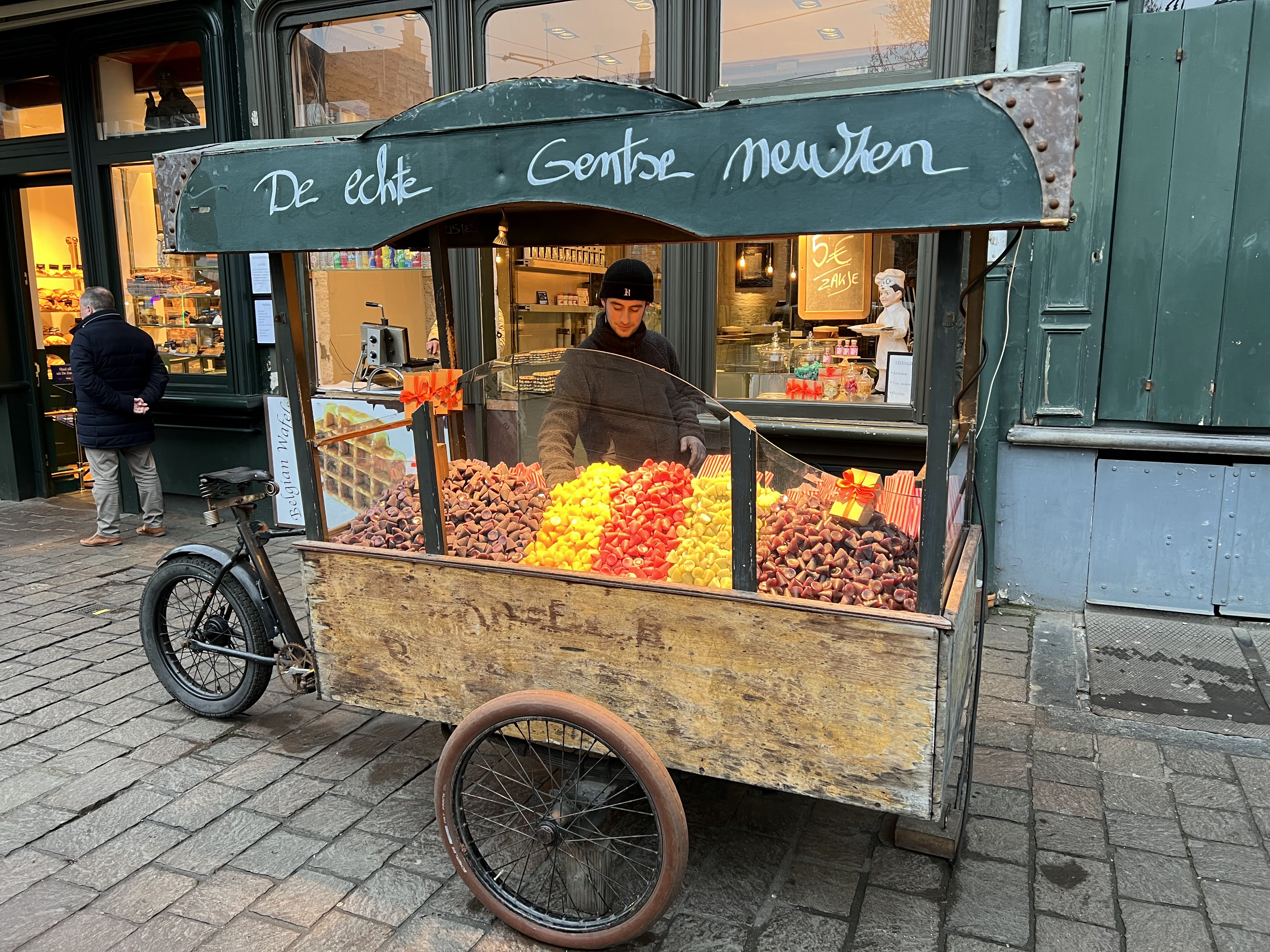
Cuberdon: A popular local delicacy

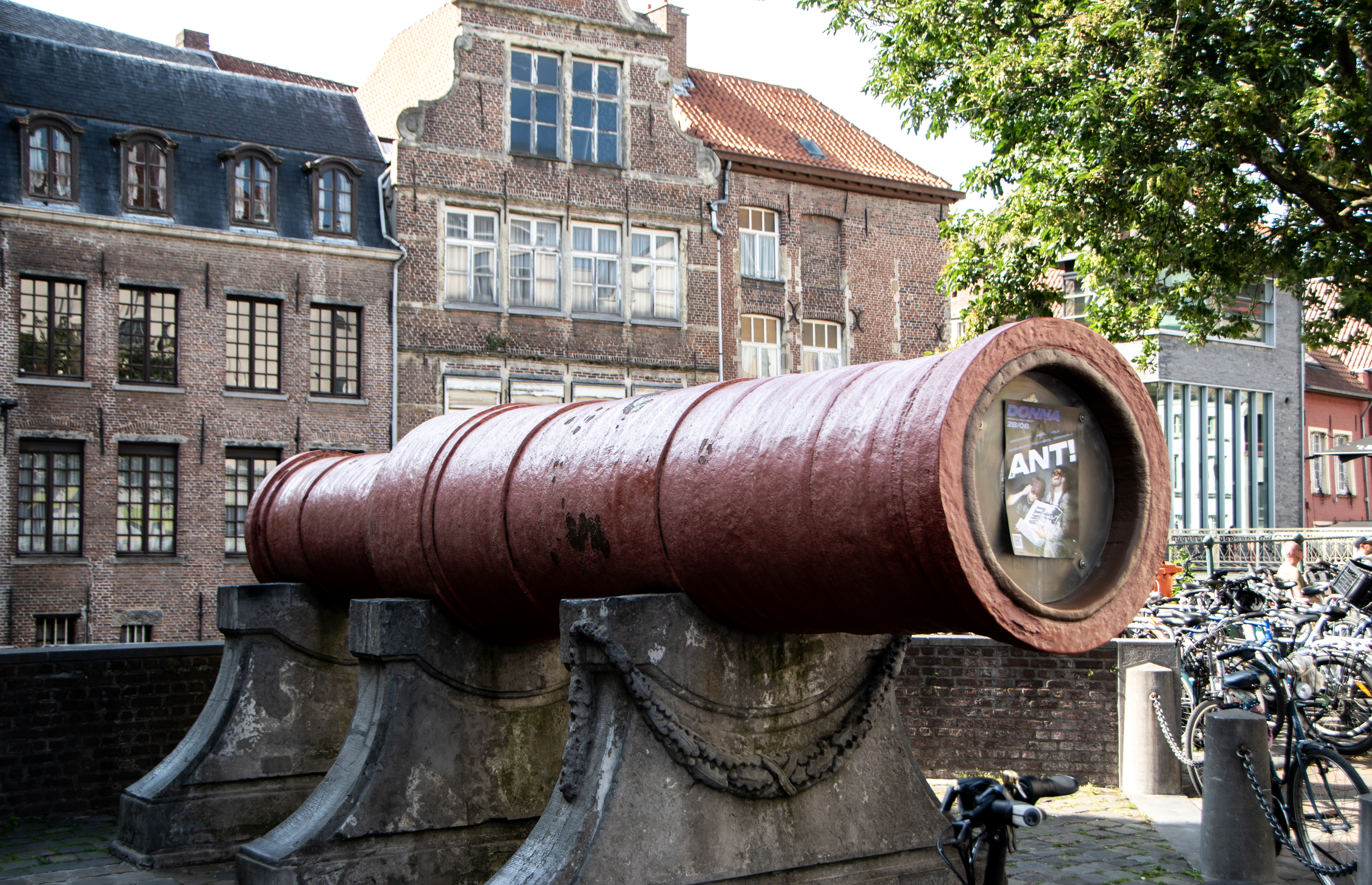
Dulle Griet, a notable medieval bombard

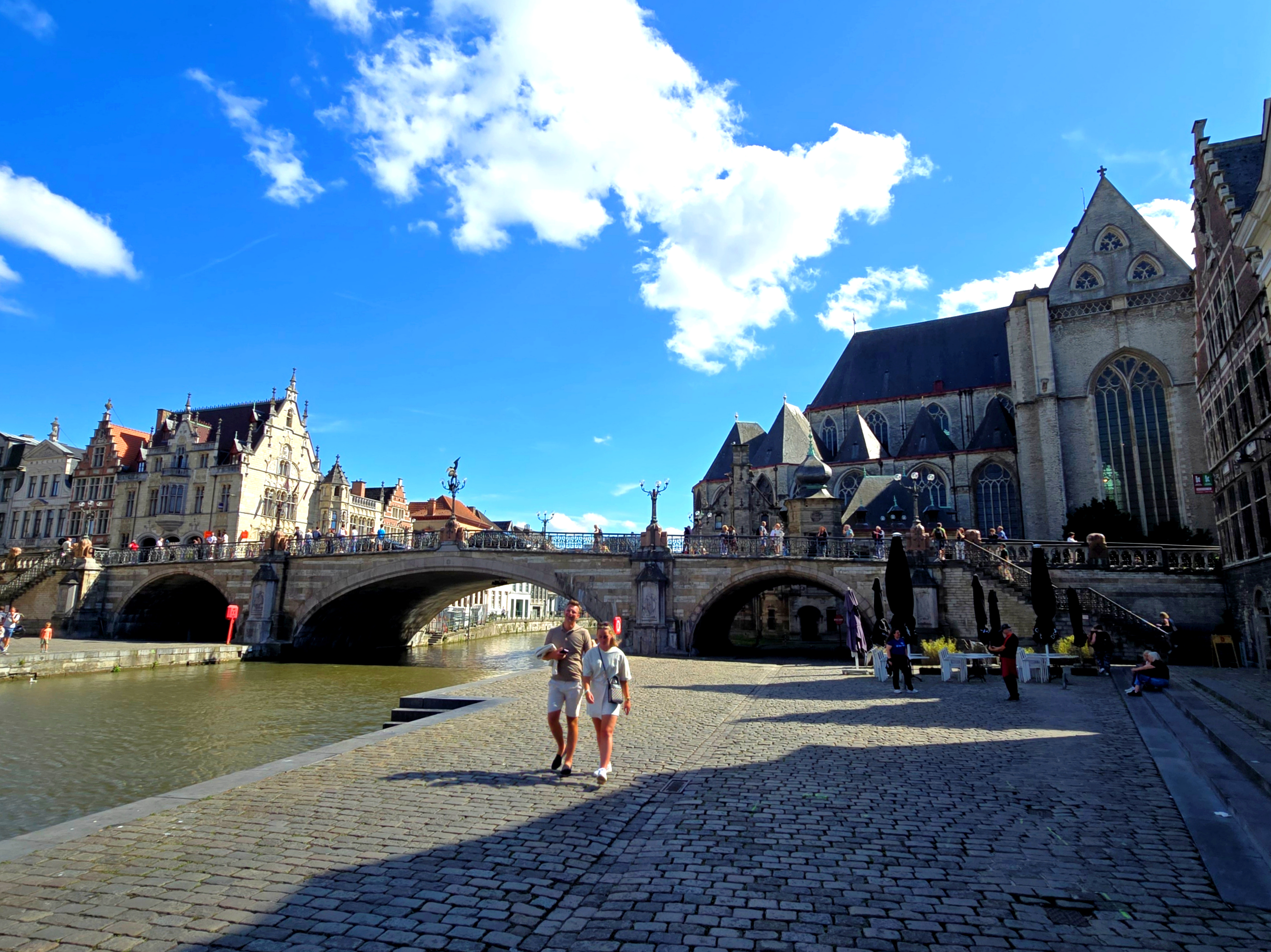
Saint Michael's bridge over the Lys (Leie) river and Saint Michael's church

== See also ==
- List of Mayors of Ghent
- Port of Ghent
