= Charlotte de Witte =

Belgian DJ and record producer

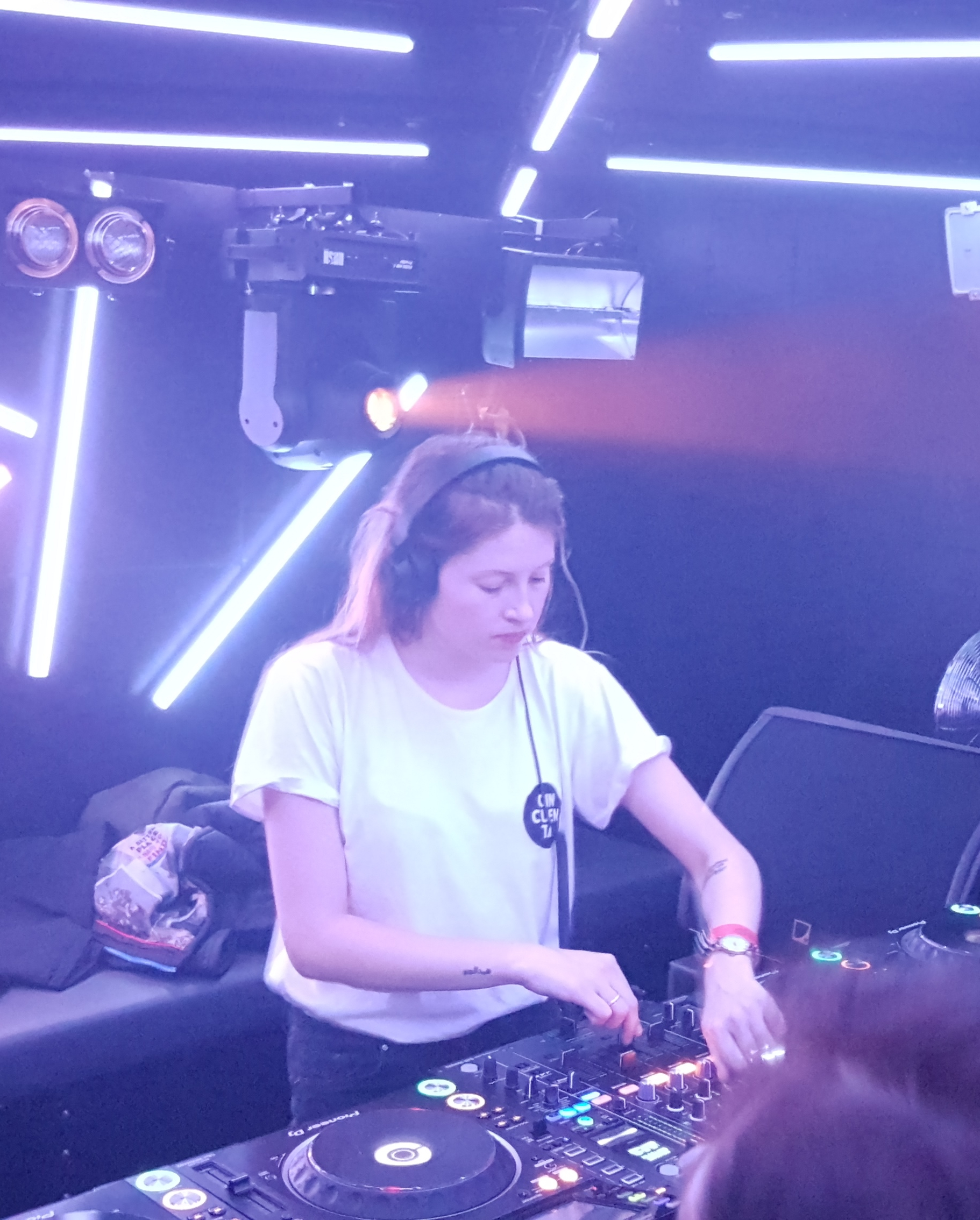
- de Witte in 2017

Background information
- Also known as: Charly; Raving George
- Born: Charlotte Aloïs de Witte; 21 July 1992 (age 34); Ghent, East Flanders, Belgium
- Genre: Techno
- Occupations: DJ; record producer; label owner
- Years active: 2010–present
- Labels: Bad Life; Crux; Turbo; Novamute; KNTXT; Époque
- Website: charlottedewittemusic.com

Charlotte Aloïs de Witte (Dutch: [ˈʃɑrlɔtə ˈalɔi̯s də ˈʋɪtə], French pronunciation: [ʃaʁlɔt alɔis də vit]; born 21 July 1992) is a Belgian DJ and record producer, best known for her "dark and stripped-back" brand of acid techno and minimal techno. She is the founder of the labels KNTXT and Époque. De Witte's music is known to embody raw and gritty elements which attract both techno purists and new listeners.

De Witte first charted in the DJ Mag Top 100 poll in 2019 at #74. She reached a career high of #6 in the latest 2026 ranking, marking the first time in her career she ranked within the top 10.

== History ==
De Witte was born in Ghent, Belgium on 21 July 1992.

Around 2009, she started to explore Ghent's underground nightclub scene, where she was drawn to electronic music. She started DJing in 2010, mainly playing electro music; her production work commenced about two years later. Winning a Studio Brussel DJ contest in 2011, she subsequently performed at the Tomorrowland festival. She adopted the alias Raving George to avoid negative preconceptions against female DJs, releasing her debut EP in 2013. Following the release of a string of EPs on Bad Life and Crux Records, her 2015 single "You're Mine", which featured Oscar and the Wolf, became a hit.

In 2015, de Witte dropped her alias and started using her real name. This was accompanied by a change in her music style from previously electro and electro house towards techno. She cites a set by German techno DJ Len Faki that she heard at a festival as the origin of this stylistic change. Her debut EP under her name, Weltschmerz, was released on the same year on Turbo Recordings. This was followed by a string of 2017 EPs, as well as 2018's Heart of Mine and The Healer EPs. de Witte has performed at various notable electronic music events, including Junction 2 Festival, Boiler Room and Printworks.

In 2019, she launched her own label, KNTXT. Artists such as Chris Liebing, Monoloc, or Alignment have released works under KNTXT. In the same year, she was voted the world's best techno DJ at the DJ Awards. Since 2019, she has advanced to one of the most acclaimed DJs in techno, winning notable awards in the industry and earning the nickname "techno queen".

On 5 February 2021, de Witte announced via social media her engagement to Italian techno DJ and producer Enrico Sangiuliano. Later that year, the couple released their first joint record: a remix of the 1990 Italian-Belgian trance song "The Age of Love". The remix became a hit, topping Beatport's 2021 techno bestsellers list and receiving a gold record in 2022 for over 500,000 units sold. The couple married in 2022.

In January 2024, de Witte launched the new label Époque, a platform for remixes of iconic tracks from Belgium. On 9 February 2024, de Witte opened a temporary KNTXT Store in Brussels, situated at Square Sainctelette 4. On 7 February 2025, de Witte played a free set at Stadshal, Ghent, in front of 12,500 fans. In 2025, de Witte was named the 9th best DJ in the world by DJ Mag's Top 100 DJs poll, marking the first time in her career she ranked within the top 10. On 11 April 2026, de Witte played a free set at Genoa's Piazza Matteotti, in front of 20,000 fans.

On 25 July 2026, de Witte announced the end of her six-year relationship with Enrico Sangiuliano via social media.

== Discography ==
Charlotte de Witte discography as adapted from Discogs:

DJ mixes

- Turbo Promo DJ Mix (2016)
- Connection (2017)
- Groove Podcast 163 (2018)
- SonneMondSterne XXII (2018)

Extended plays

- Monodon Monoceros (2013; as Raving George)
- Obverse EP (2013; as Raving George)
- Slaves / Alternate (2013; as Raving George)
- Weltschmerz (2015)
- Trip (2016)
- Sehnsucht (2016)
- Actually (2016)
- Brussels (2017)
- Voices of the Ancient (2017)
- Closer (2017)
- Our Journey (2017)
- Wisdom (2017)
- Heart of Mine (2018)
- The Healer (2018)
- Liquid Slow (2019; collaboration with Chris Liebing)
- Pressure (2019)
- Selected (2019)
- Vision (2020)
- Return to Nowhere (2020)
- Rave on Time (2020)
- Formula (2021)
- Asura (2021)
- Universal Consciousness (2022)
- Apollo (2022)
- Reflection (2023; collaboration with Enrico Sangiuliano)
- Overdrive (2023)
- Power of Thought (2023)
- Sanctum (2024)
- One Mind (2025; collaboration with Amelie Lens)
- A Prayer For The Dancefloor (2026)
- Amor (2026)
- The Resistance (2026)

Long plays

- Charlotte de Witte (2025)

Singles

- "You're Mine" featuring Oscar and the Wolf (2015; as Raving George)
- "The Age of Love" (2021; featuring Enrico Sangiuliano)
- "High Street" (2023)
- "Roar" (2024)
- "How You Move" (2024)
- "The Realm" (2025)
- "No Division" (2025)
- "The Heads that Know" (2025; featuring Comma Dee)

Remixes

- Jerome Isma-Ae – "Hold That Sucker Down (Trance & Rave remix)" (2020)
- Bob Moses & Zhu – "Desire" (2020)
- Universal Nation – "Push" (2024)
- Scoop – "Drop It" (2025)

== Awards and nominations ==
=== DJ Awards ===
Year	Nominee / Work	Category	Result	Ref.
2018	Charlotte de Witte	Best Techno Artist	Nominated	
2019	Charlotte de Witte	Techno Award	Won	

=== DJ Mag's top 100 DJs ===
Year	Position	Notes	Ref.
2019	74	▲74	
2020	32	▲42	
2021	23	▲9	
2022	14	▲8	
2023	18	▼4	
2024	16	▲2	
2025	9	▲7	
2026	6	▲3	

=== DJ Mag's Alternative top 100 DJs powered by Beatport ===
Year	Position	Notes	Ref.
2018	17	▲17	
2019	7	▲10	
2020	1	▲6	
2021	1	0	

=== DJ Mag's Techno top 100 DJs ===
Year	Position	Notes	Ref.
2022	1	0	
2023	1	0	
2024	1	0	
2025	1	0	
2026	1	0	

=== International Dance Music Awards ===
Year	Nominee / Work	Category	Result	Ref.
2019	Charlotte de Witte	Best Techno Artist (Female)	Won	
2020	Charlotte de Witte	Best Techno Artist (Female)	Won	
