= Stadshal, Ghent =

Large stand-alone canopy in Ghent, Belgium

Coordinates: 51°3′15″N 3°43′28″E

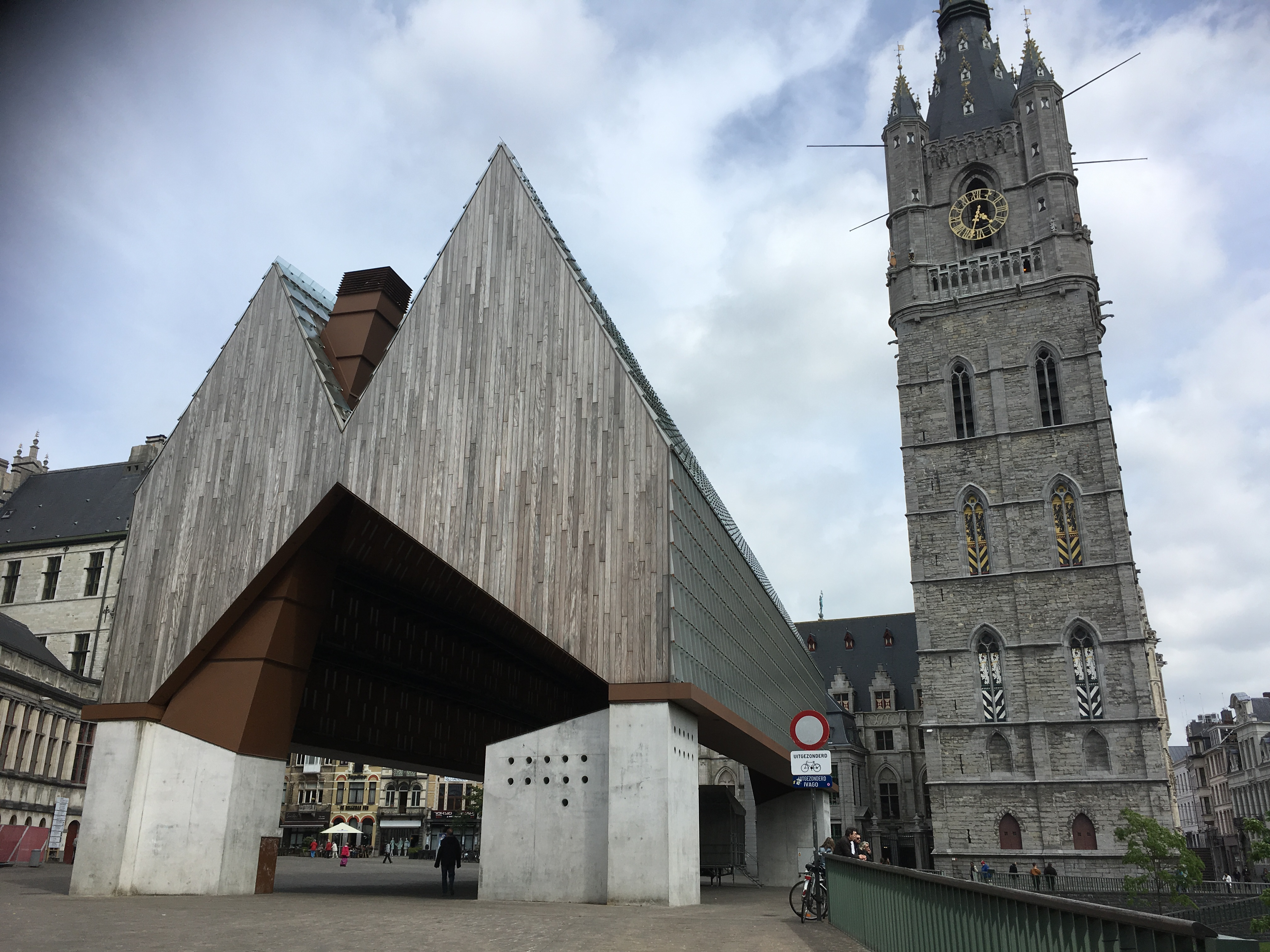
Stadshal (left) and Belfry of Ghent

The Stadshal (English: City Pavilion) is a large stand-alone canopy in the inner city of Ghent, Belgium. The construction was part of the city project to redevelop the squares and public spaces in Ghent's historic city centre.

The Stadshal, located on the square between the Belfry, the Renaissance Town Hall and St. Nicholas' Church, received criticism upon its construction in 2012, because of its size, height and use of modern materials in the historical surroundings.
