= Saint Nicholas Church, Ghent =

Saint Nicholas Church
- Sint-Niklaaskerk
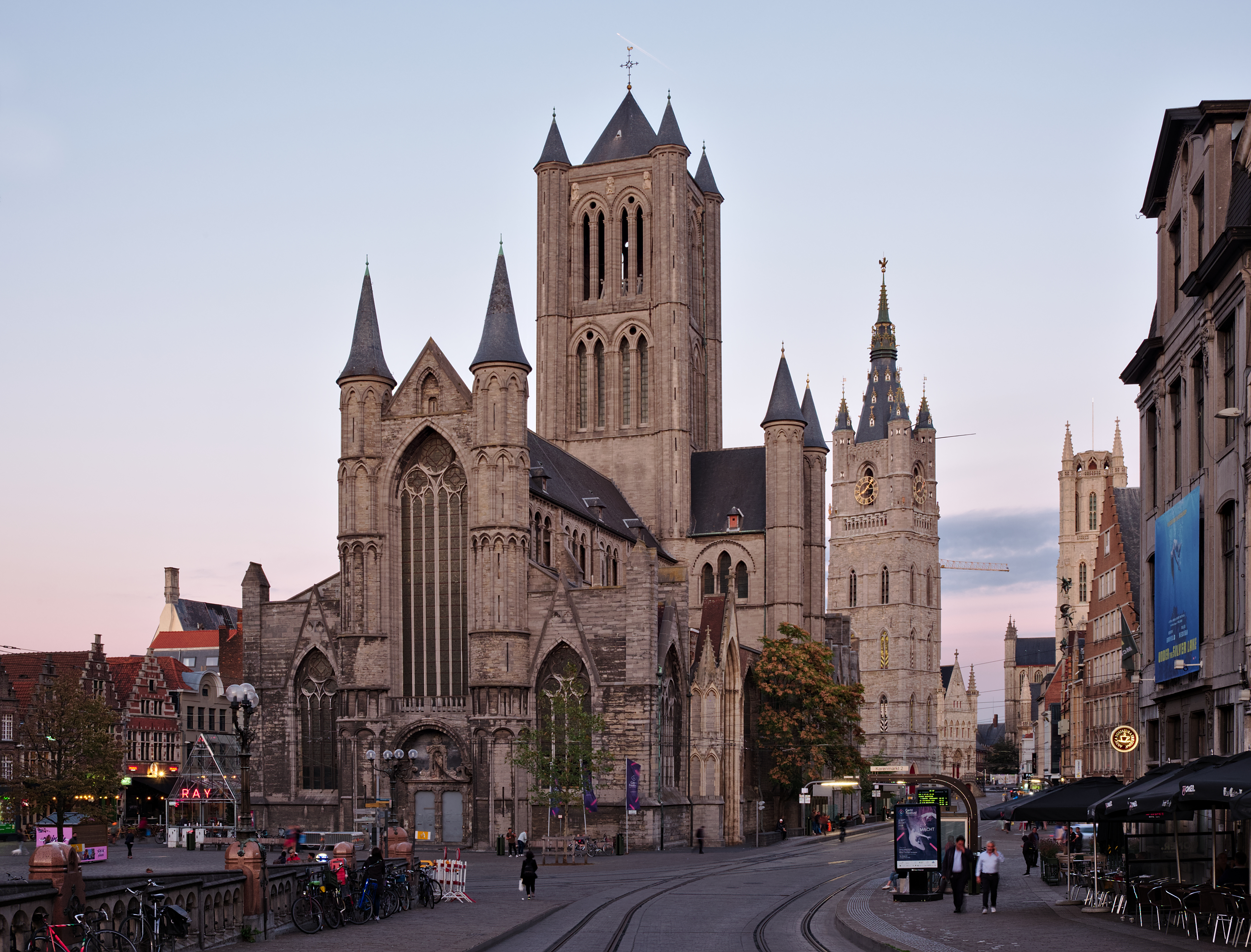
- St. Nicholas Church
- Saint Nicholas Church
- 51.0540°N 3.7229°E
- Location: Ghent
- Country: Belgium
- Denomination: Roman Catholic
- Website: www.sintniklaaskerk.be

Architecture
- Style: Scheldt Gothic
- Groundbreaking: 13th century

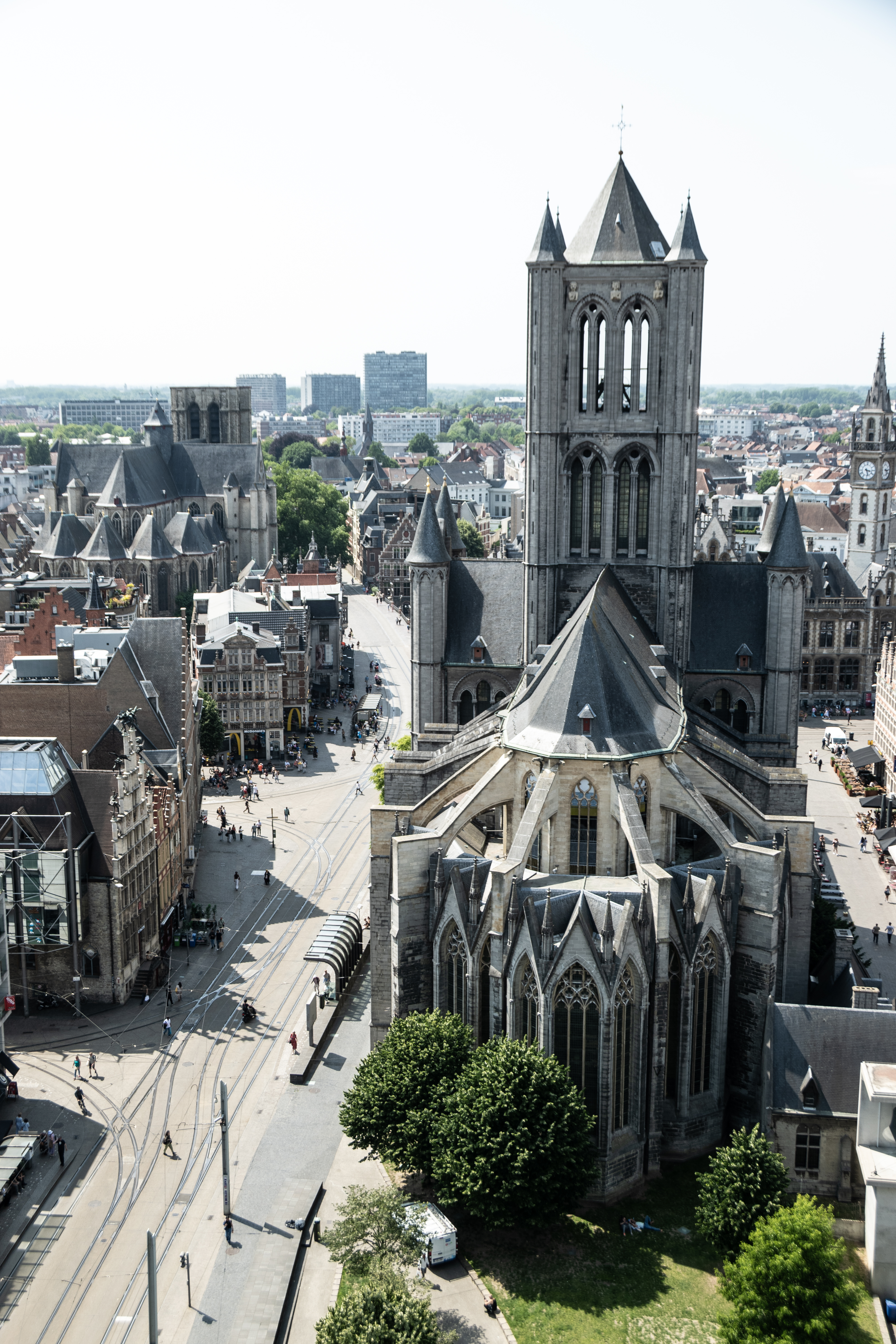
St. Nicholas Church in context, viewed from the Belfry of Ghent in 2025

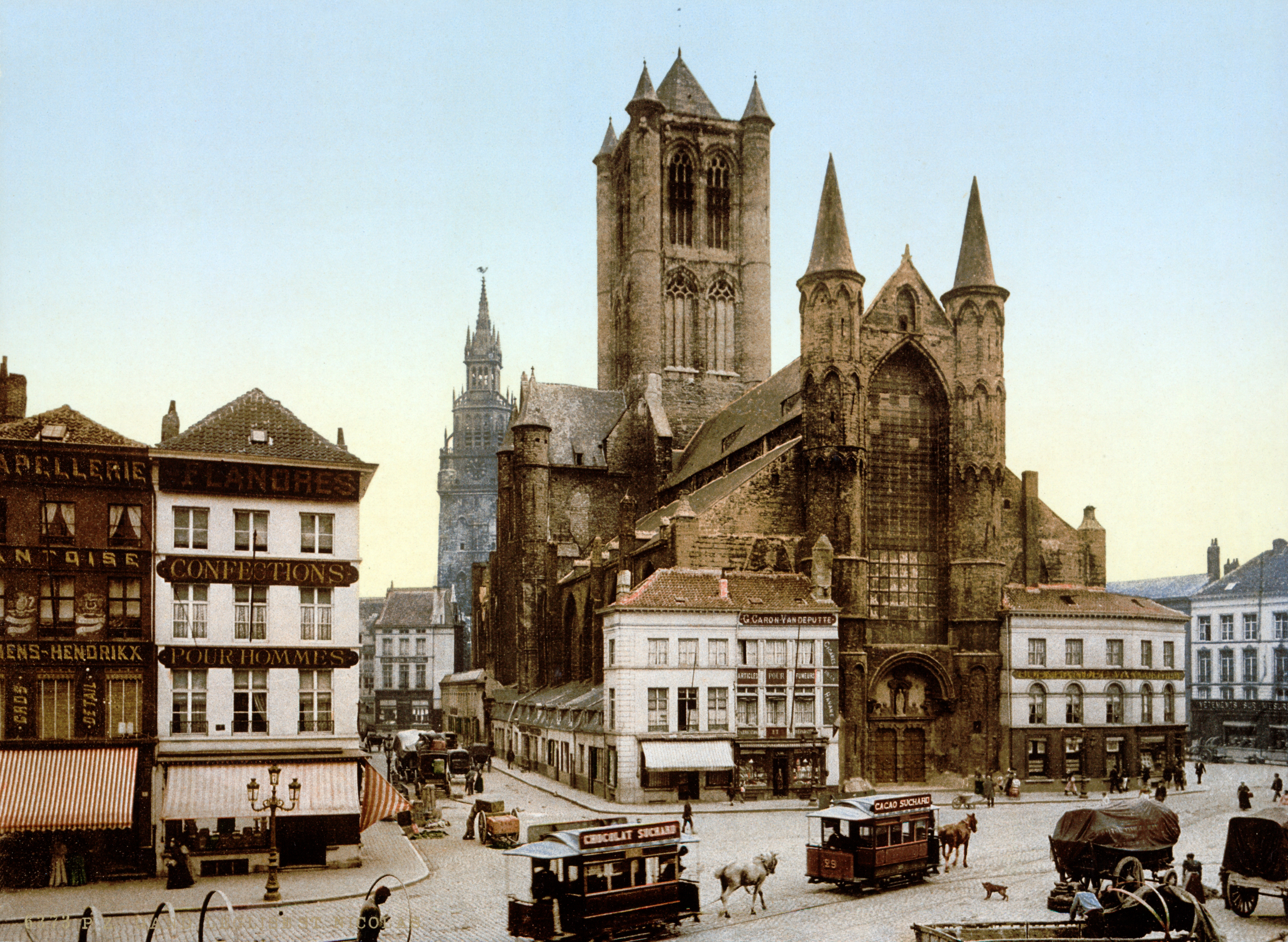
St. Nicholas Church, c. 1890–1900

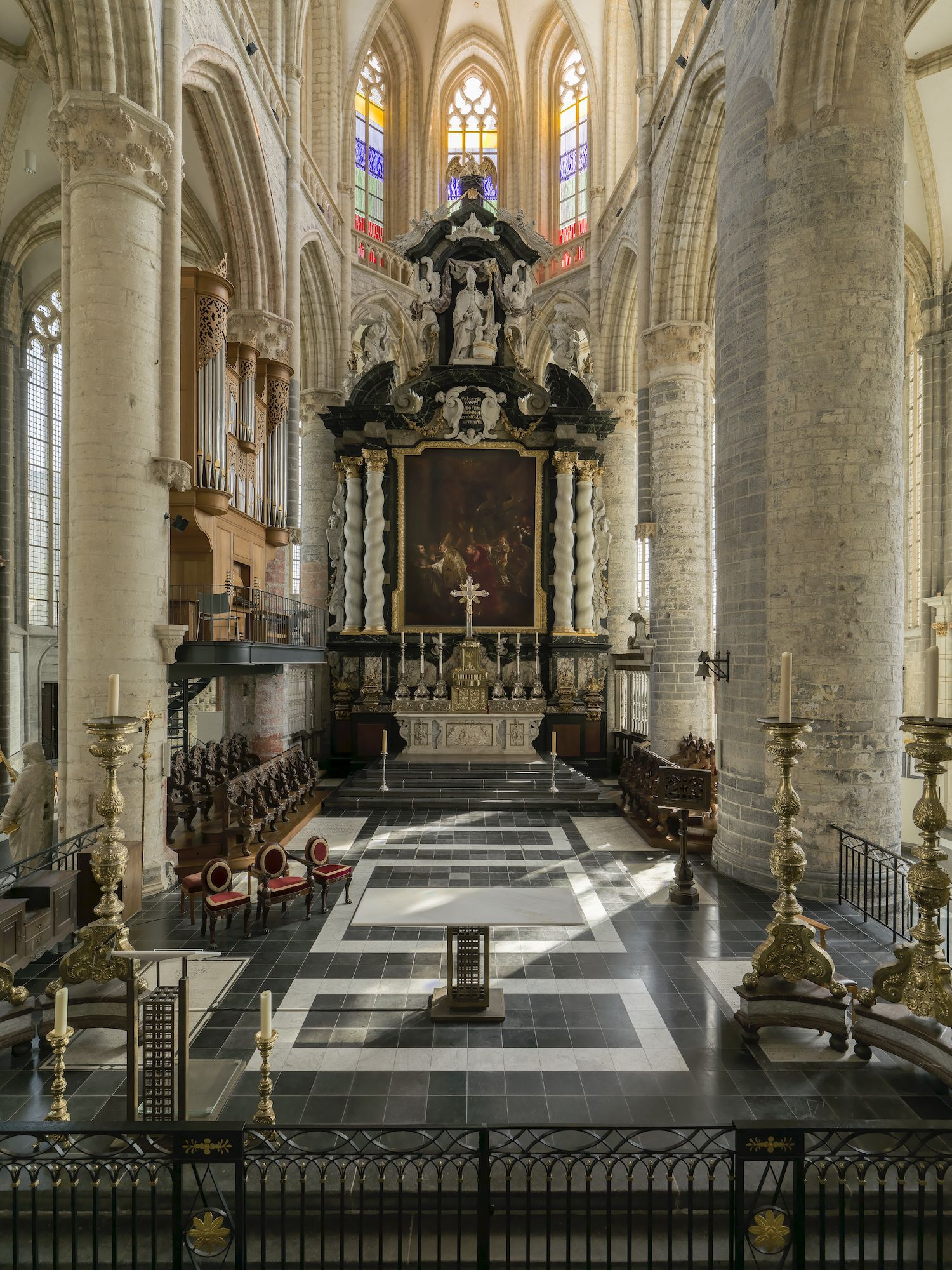
Choir and main altar

St. Nicholas Church (Dutch: Sint-Niklaaskerk) is a Roman Catholic church, as well as one of the oldest and most prominent landmarks in Ghent, Belgium. Begun in the early 13th century as a replacement for an earlier Romanesque church, construction continued through the rest of the century in the local Scheldt Gothic style (named after the nearby river). Typical of this style is the use of blue-gray stone from the Tournai area, the single large tower above the crossing, and the slender turrets at the building's corners.

Built in the old trade center of Ghent next to the bustling Korenmarkt (Wheat Market), St. Nicholas Church was popular with the guilds whose members carried out their business nearby. The guilds had their own chapels which were added to the sides of the church in the 14th and 15th centuries.

The central tower, which was funded in part by the city, served as an observation post and carried the town bells until the neighboring Belfry of Ghent was built. These two towers, along with St. Bavo's Cathedral, still define the skyline of the city center. One of the treasures of the church is its organ, produced by the famous French organ builder Aristide Cavaillé-Coll.

== Restoration ==
The building gradually deteriorated through the centuries, to a degree that threatened its stability. Cracks were overlaid with plaster, windows were bricked up to reinforce the walls, and in the 18th century, little houses and shops were built up against the dilapidated facades. Interest in the church as a historical monument arose around 1840, and at the turn of the 20th century major restoration plans emerged. The houses alongside the church were demolished and much renovation work has been carried out since then.

== Organ ==
The organ in St. Nicholas Church is one of the most important Romantic organs of Belgium. It was built by the noted French organ builder Aristide Cavaillé-Coll.

=== History ===
Before the Cavaillé-Coll organ, the church had an organ built in 1840 by the Flemish organ builder Pierre Van Pethegem.

In 1850, François-Joseph Fétis advocated the construction of a model organ in Belgium, he got support from dean Désiré Ignace Verduyn. They asked Cavaillé-Coll to make a proposal for a new organ, the first CC organ in Belgium.

In a first proposal of March, 1853, Aristide Cavaillé-Coll suggested a two-manual instrument, partially reusing material of the Van Peteghem organ. A second proposal also suggested a two-manual instrument with almost identical disposition.

The third proposal of September 3, 1853 describes the final three-manual organ in a new case with 16' pipes in the front (Grand Orgue dit de seize pieds en Monfre).

Construction of the organ began in 1853, it was completed in 1856. The inauguration concert was performed by Louis James Alfred Lefébure-Wély on March 11, 1856.

=== Organists ===
- 1856–1867: Auguste Strauven
- 1867–1901: Désiré Van Reysschoot.
- 1901–1946: Cyriel Van den Abeele

=== Restoration ===
During the restoration of the church, the organ was enclosed in a wooden case. The organ was last played in 1961. For half a century the organ could not be played nor seen.

In 2010 the wooden case was removed, the organ was cleaned and became visible again. It is not playable yet since the wind supply was removed and is currently in storage.

In 2013 the organ loft and the organ were hydraulically leveled as a first step in the restoration process.

In 2025, the organ was back in operation, with several organists playing throughout the week.

=== Disposition ===
Original disposition of March 11, 1856 (retaining the original French names):

(Positif)
I Positif C–g4
Jeux de fonds
Quintaton	16′
Flûte Harmonique	8′
Bourdon	8′
Viole de Gambe	8′
Dulciana	4′
Jeux de combinaison
Flûte octaviante	4′
Doublette	2′
Flageolet	1′
Trompette	8′
Cor anglais	8′

(Great)
II Grand Orgue C–g4
Jeux de fonds
Montre	16′
Montre	8′
Bourdon	16′
Flûte Traversière	8′
Bourdon	8′
Prestant	4′
Dulciana (1868: Unda Maris 8)	4′
Jeux de combinaison
Quinte	3′
Doublette	2′
Fourniture IV
Cymbale III
Bombarde	16′
Trompette	8′
Clairon	4′

(Swell)
III Récit expressif C–g4
Jeux de fonds
Flûte Harmonique	8′
Flûte Octaviante	4′
Viole de Gambe	8′
Voile d’Amour	4′
Voix Céleste	8′
Jeux de combinaison
Octavin	2′
Trompette	8′
Clairon	4′
Basson et Hautbois	8′
Voix Humaine	8′

(Pedal)
Pédale C–d2
Jeux de fonds
Contre Basse	16′
Basse	8′
Octave	4′
Jeux de combinaison
Bombarde	16′
Trompette	8′
Clairon	4′

- Couplers:
  - Orage
  - Cop. Pédale
  - Appel d'anches pédale
  - Octaves graves Pos., G.O., Réc.
  - Appel d'anches Pos., G.O., Réc.
  - Accoupl. Pos./G.O., Réc./G.O.
  - Trémolo voix humaine

== Gallery ==
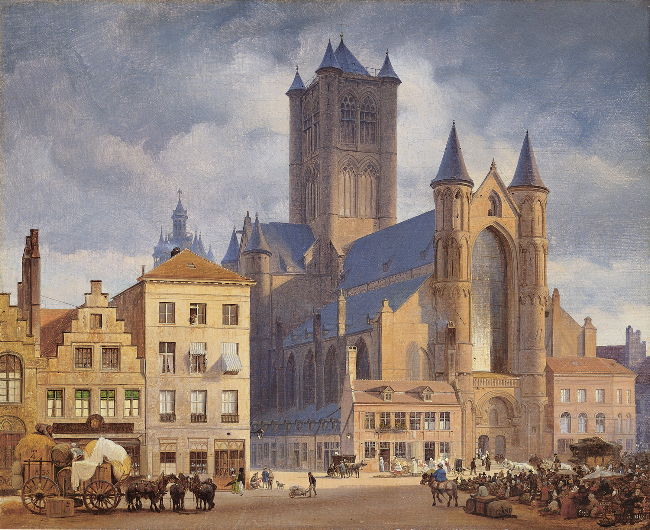
19th-century painting by Eduard Gaertner

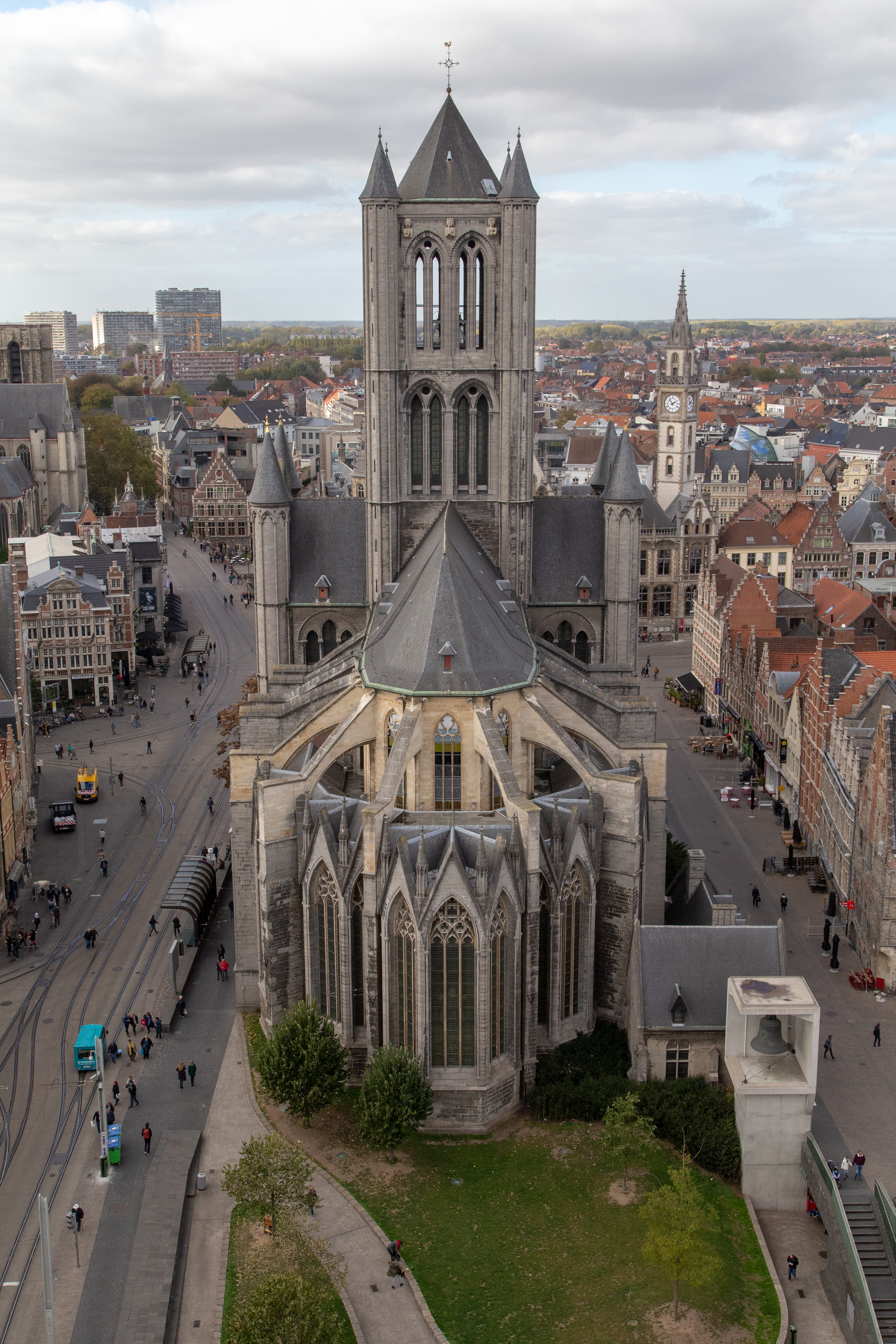
The east end, viewed from St. Bavo's Cathedral

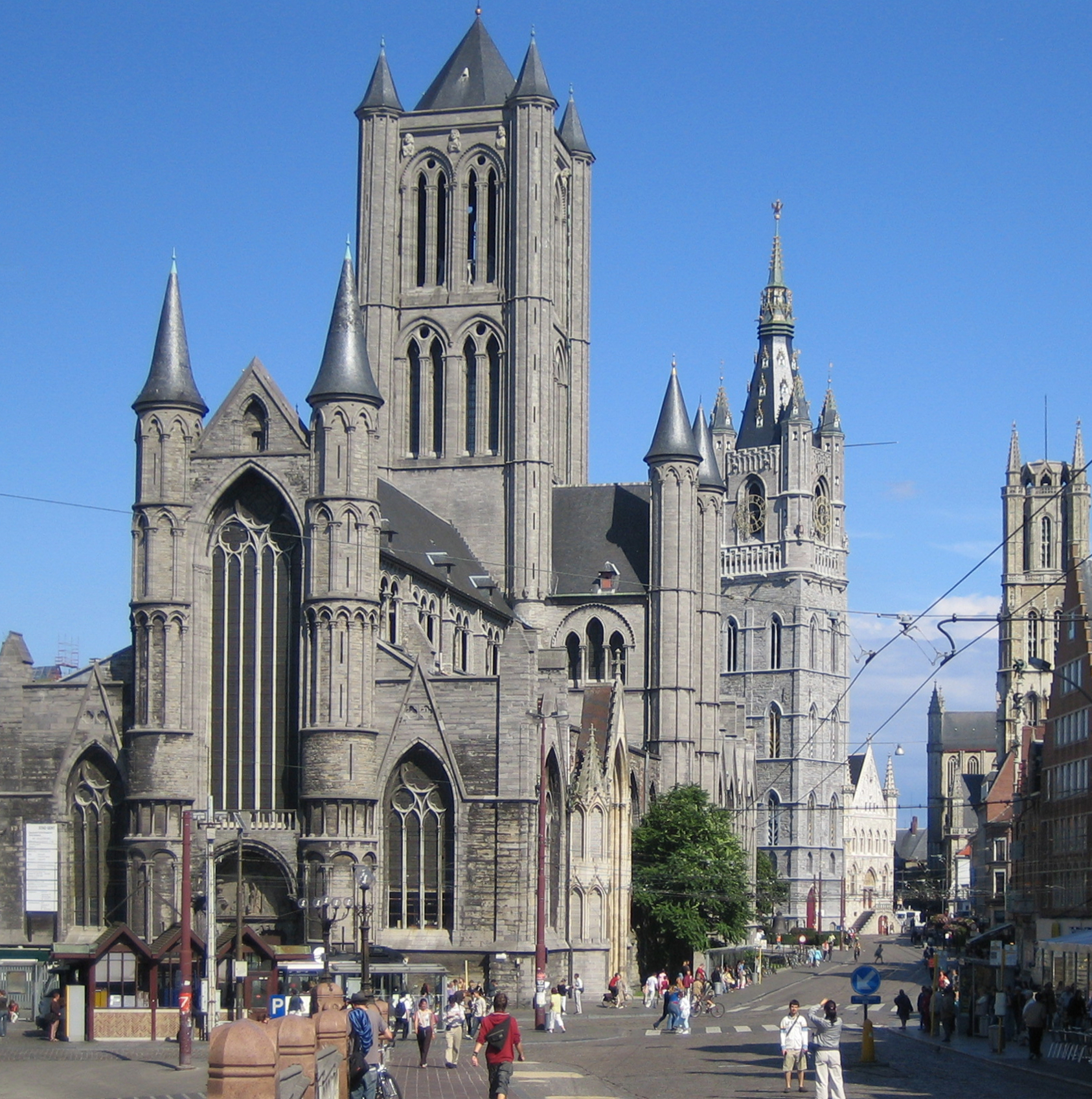
The west end, viewed from St. Michael's bridge

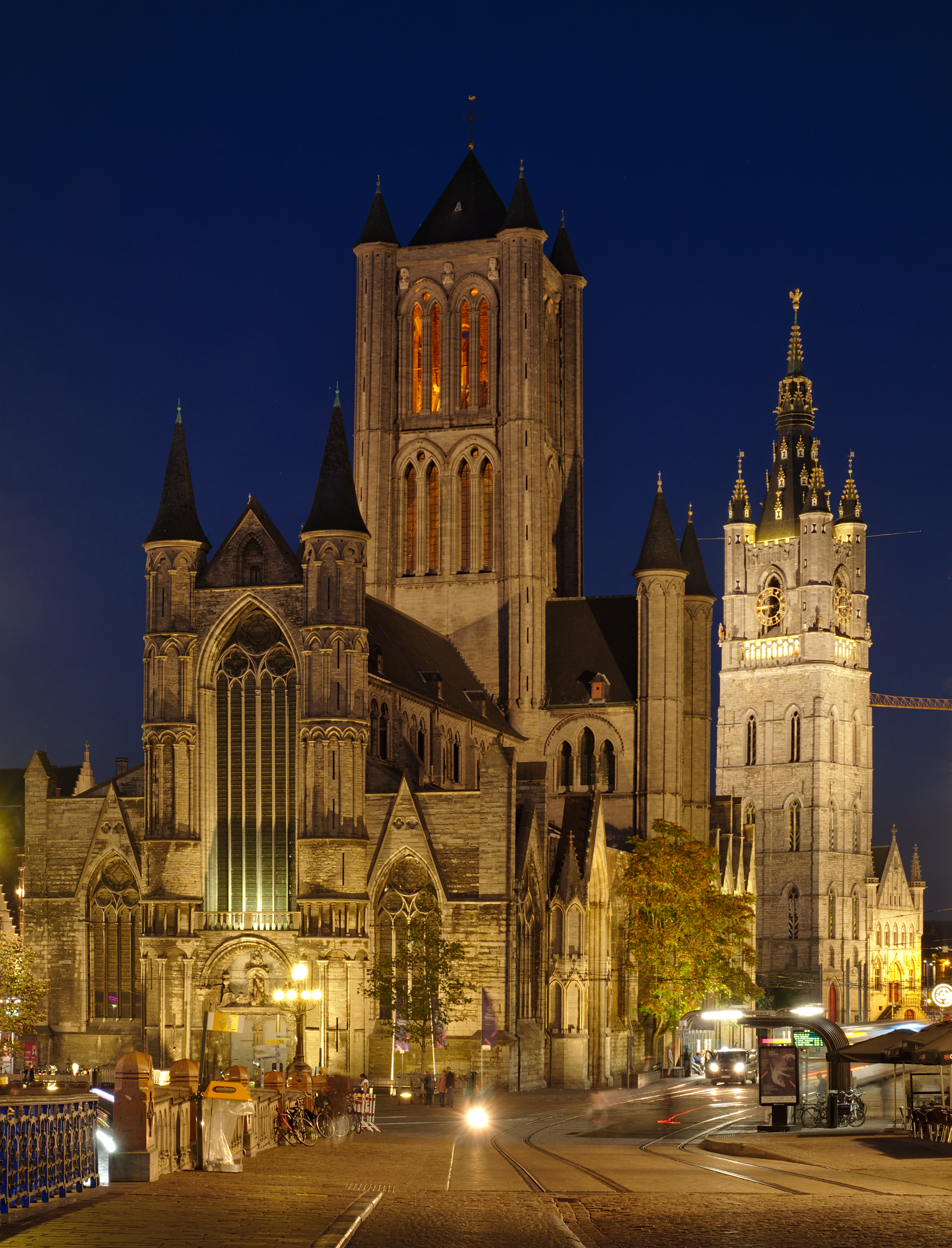
The church during nautical twilight

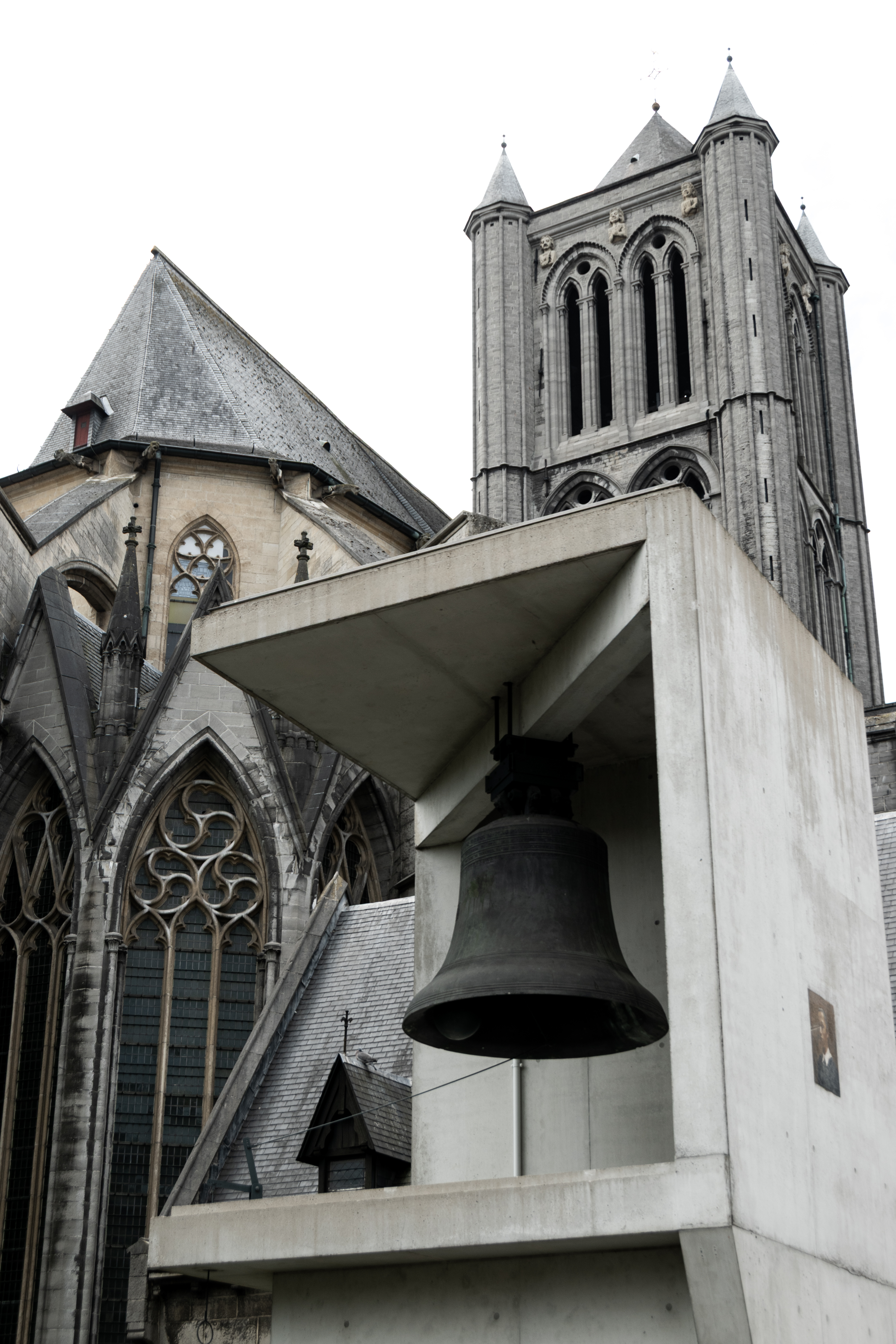
The Great Triumphant bell

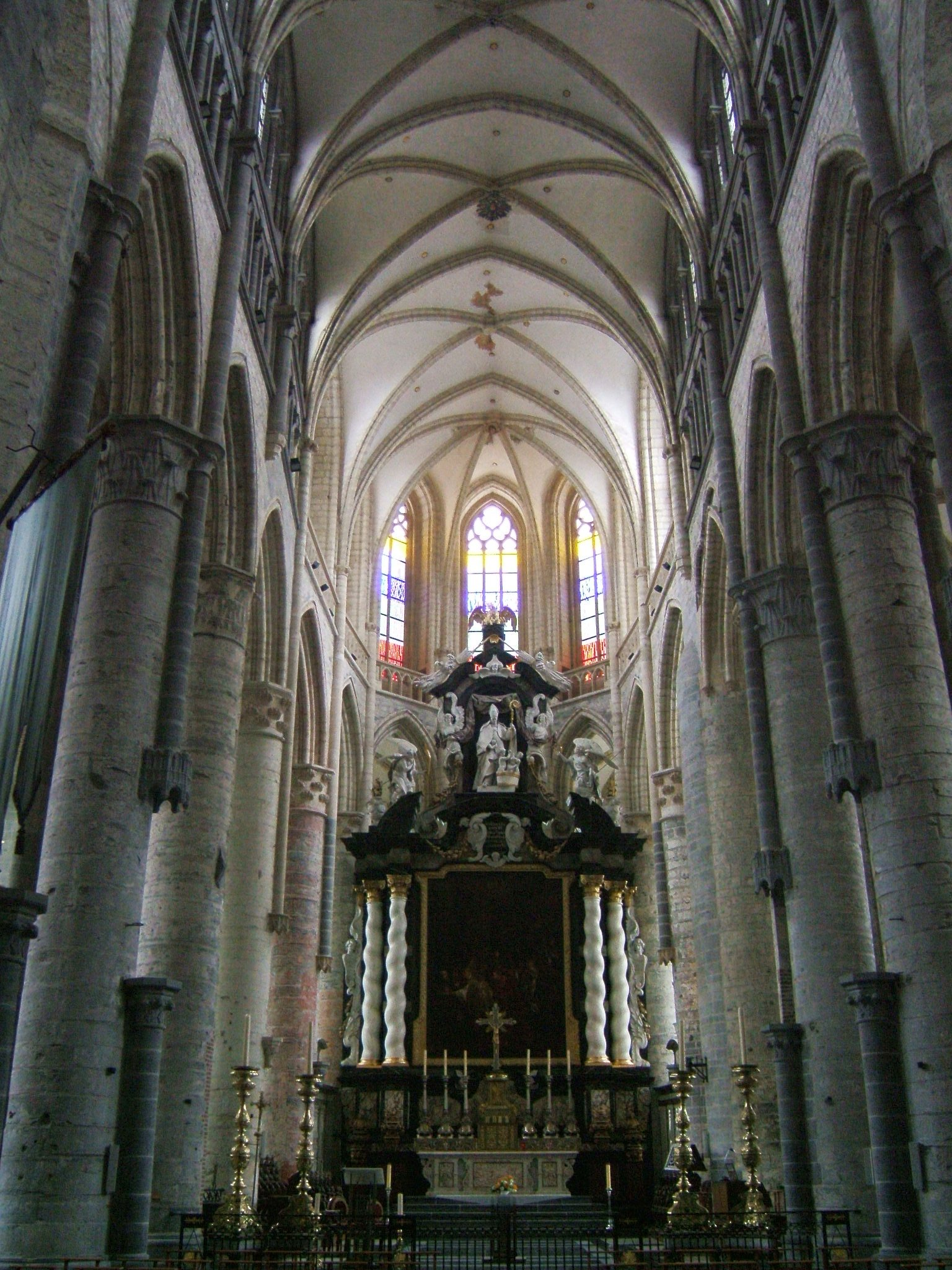
Interior view, toward altar

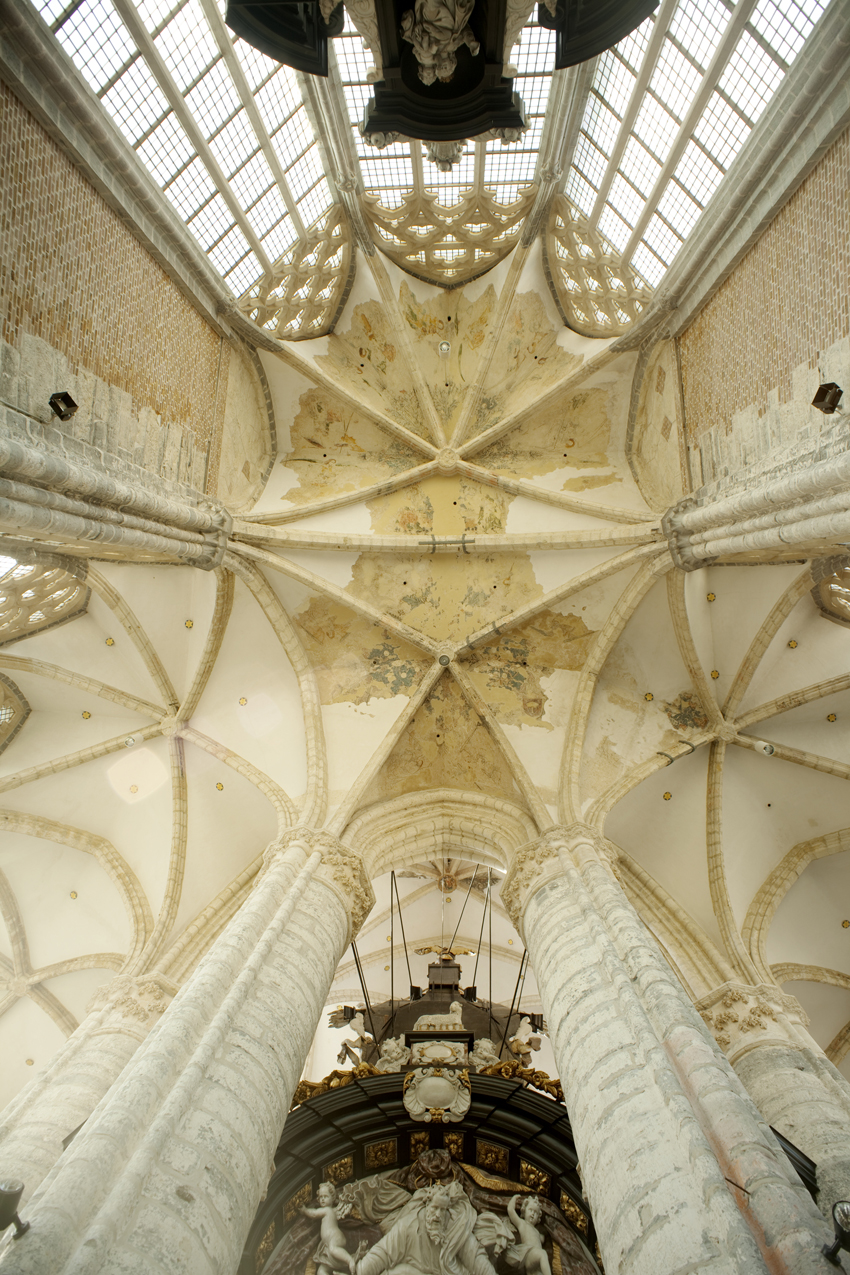
Vaulting of the church, with fresco fragments

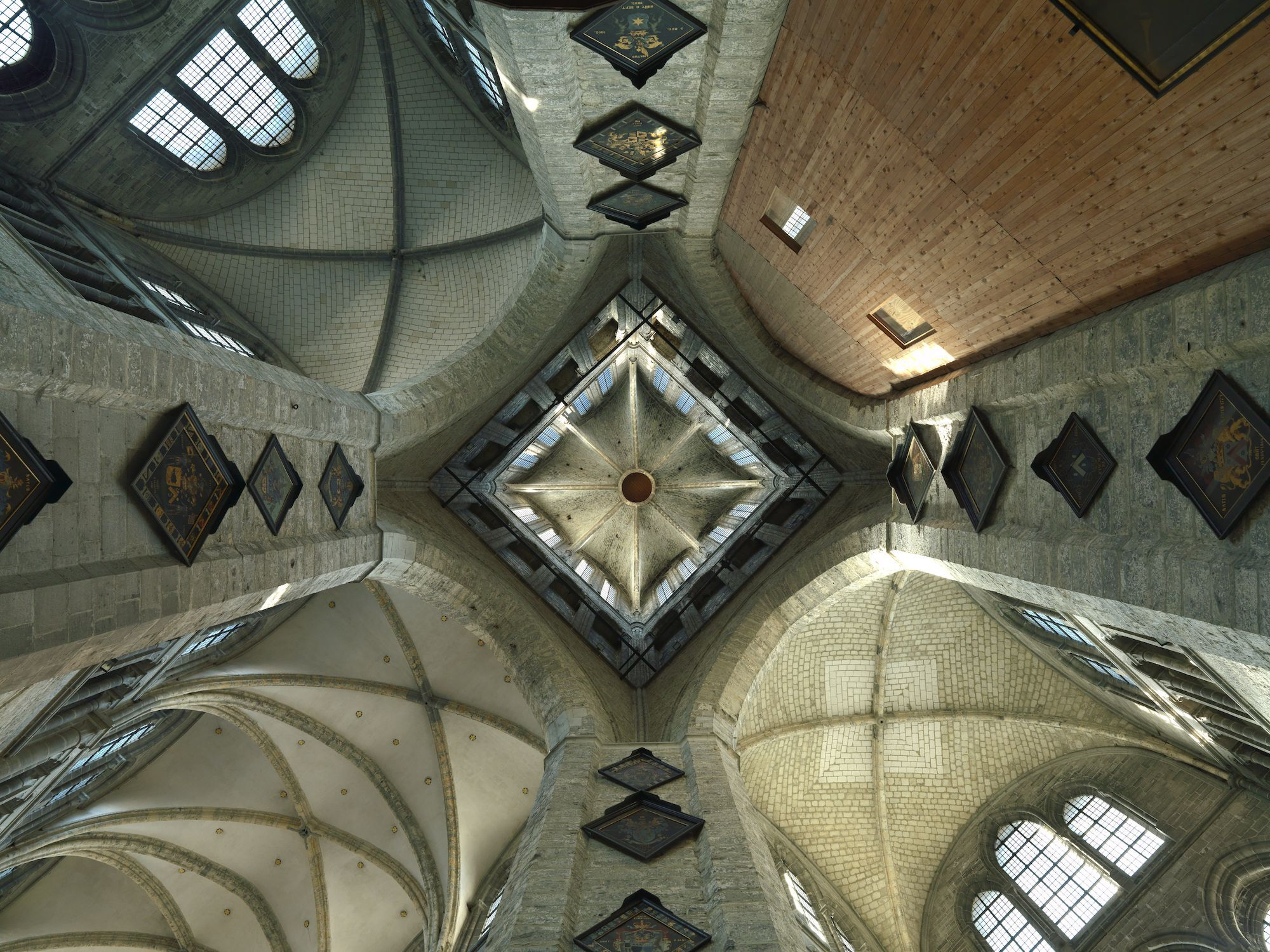
Transept lantern tower

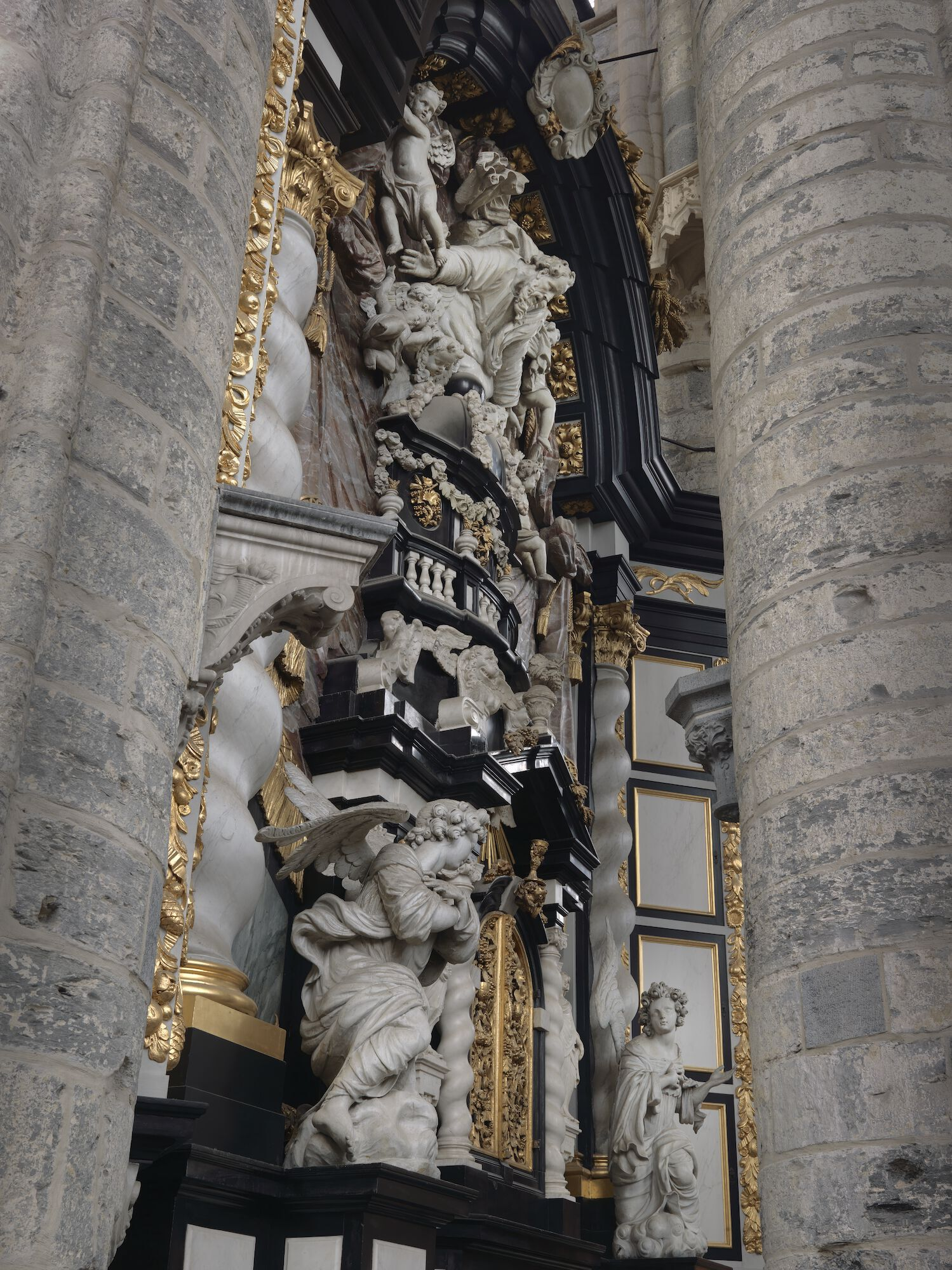
Rear of the main altar in the ambulatory

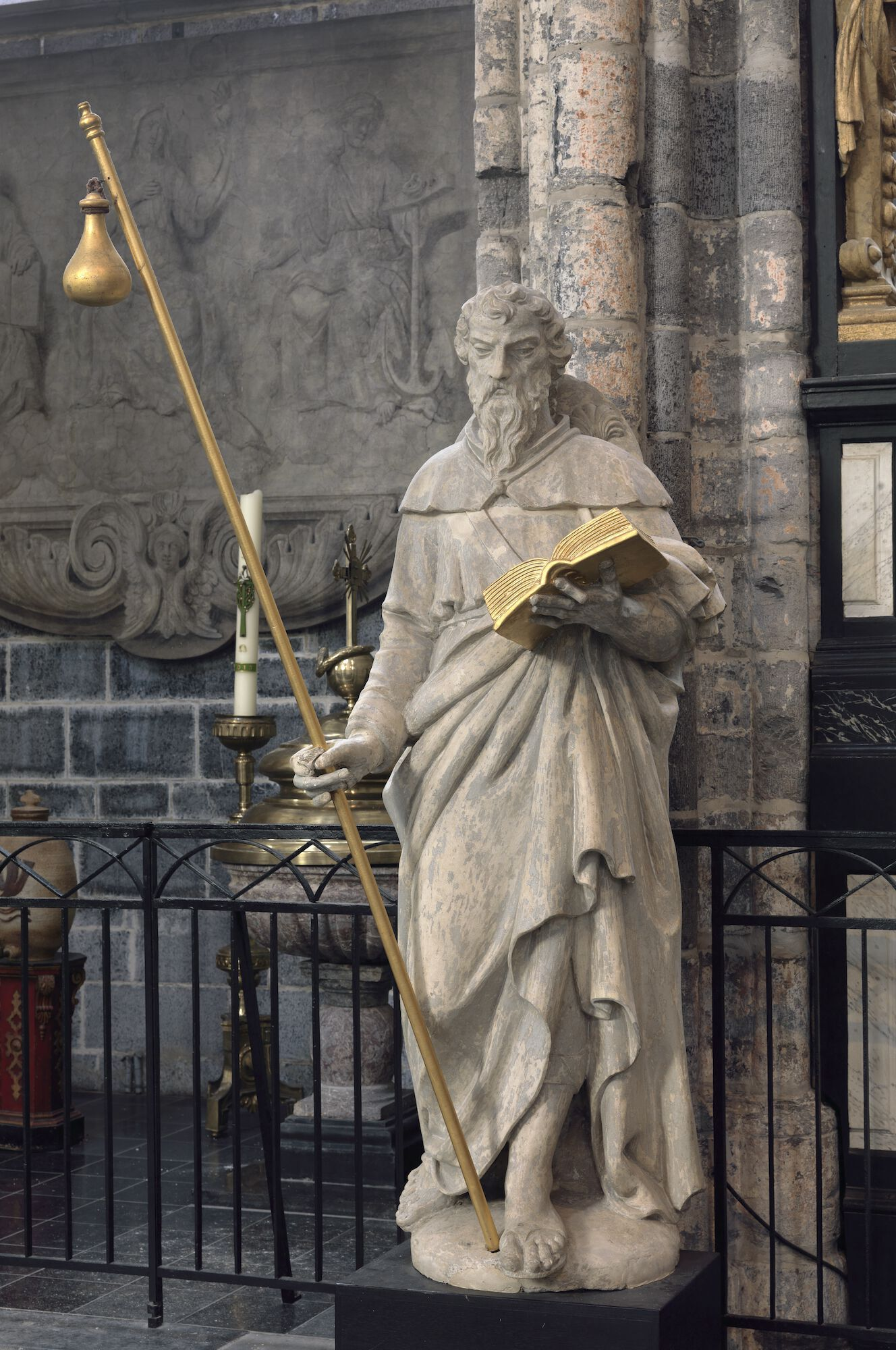
Apostle sculpture

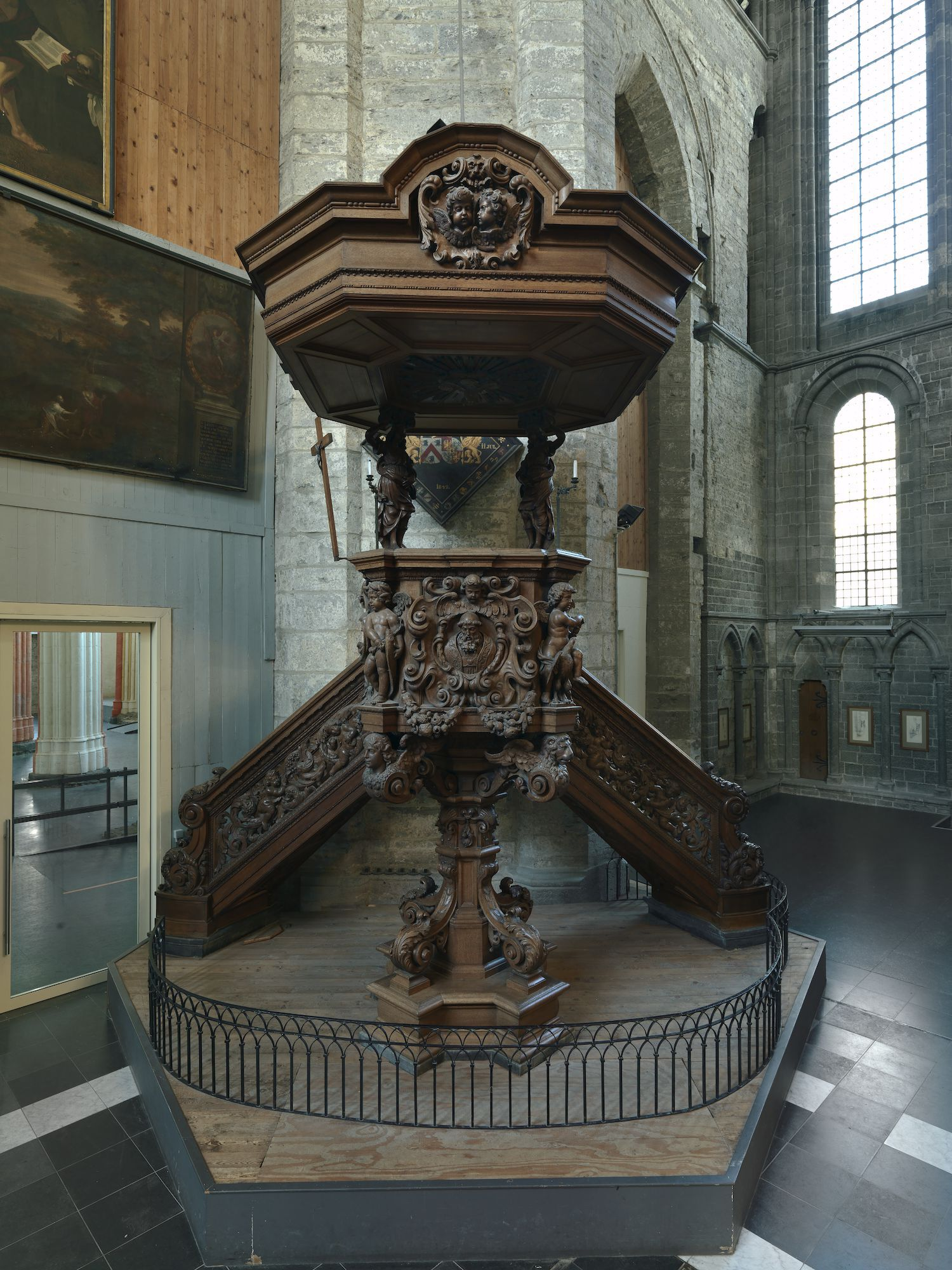
Pulpit by Norbert Sauvage

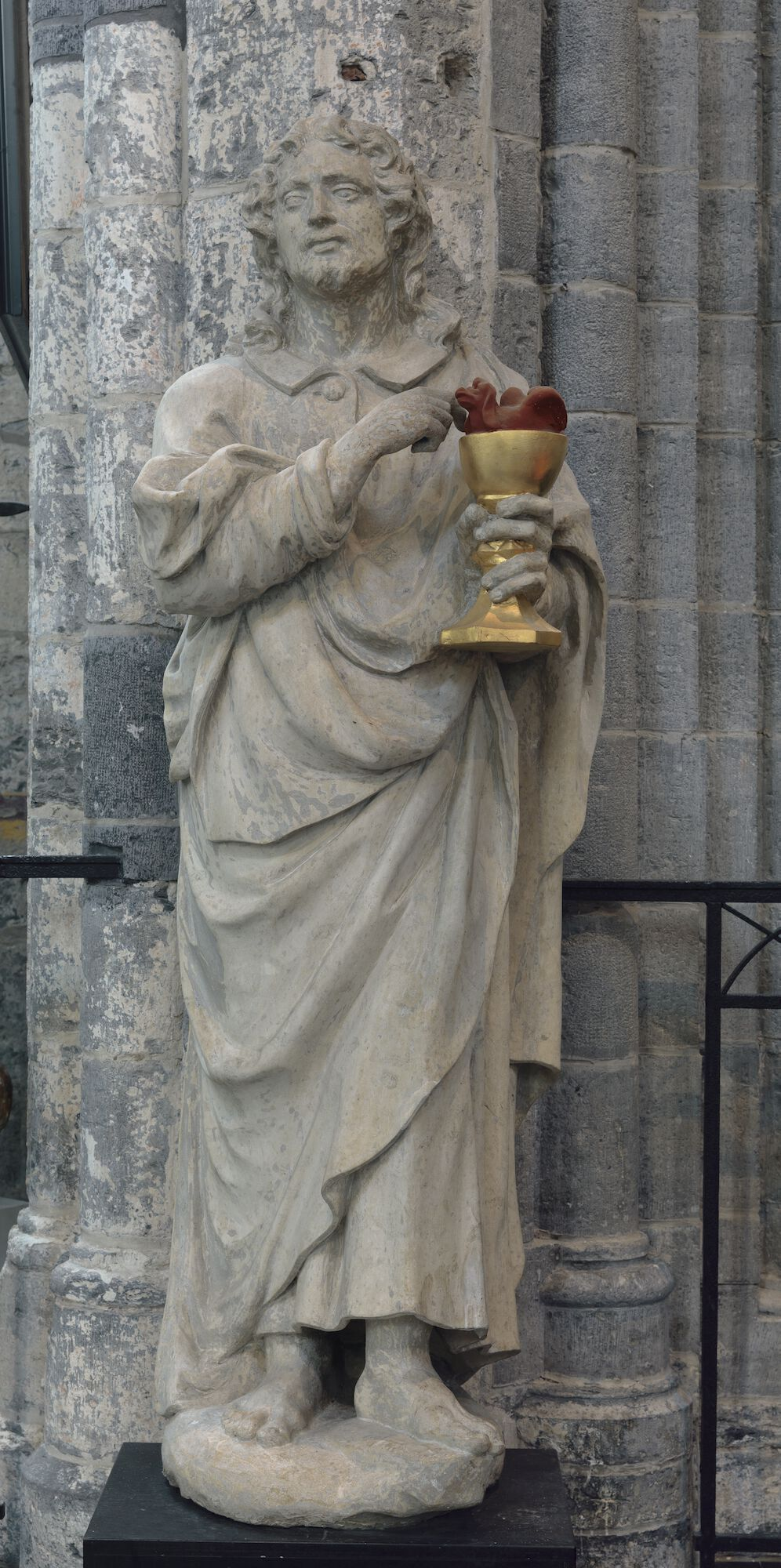
Apostles

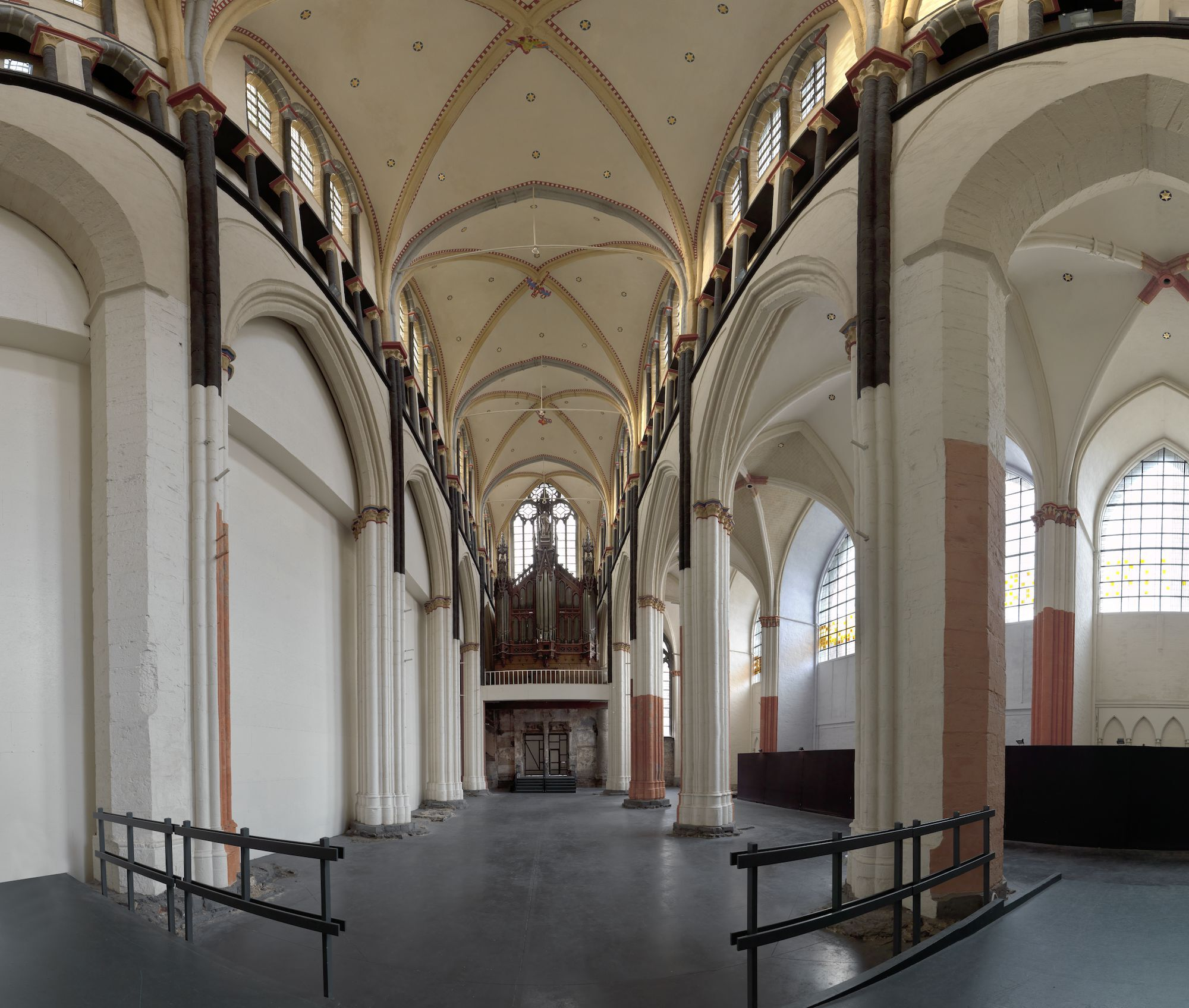
Interior view of the church

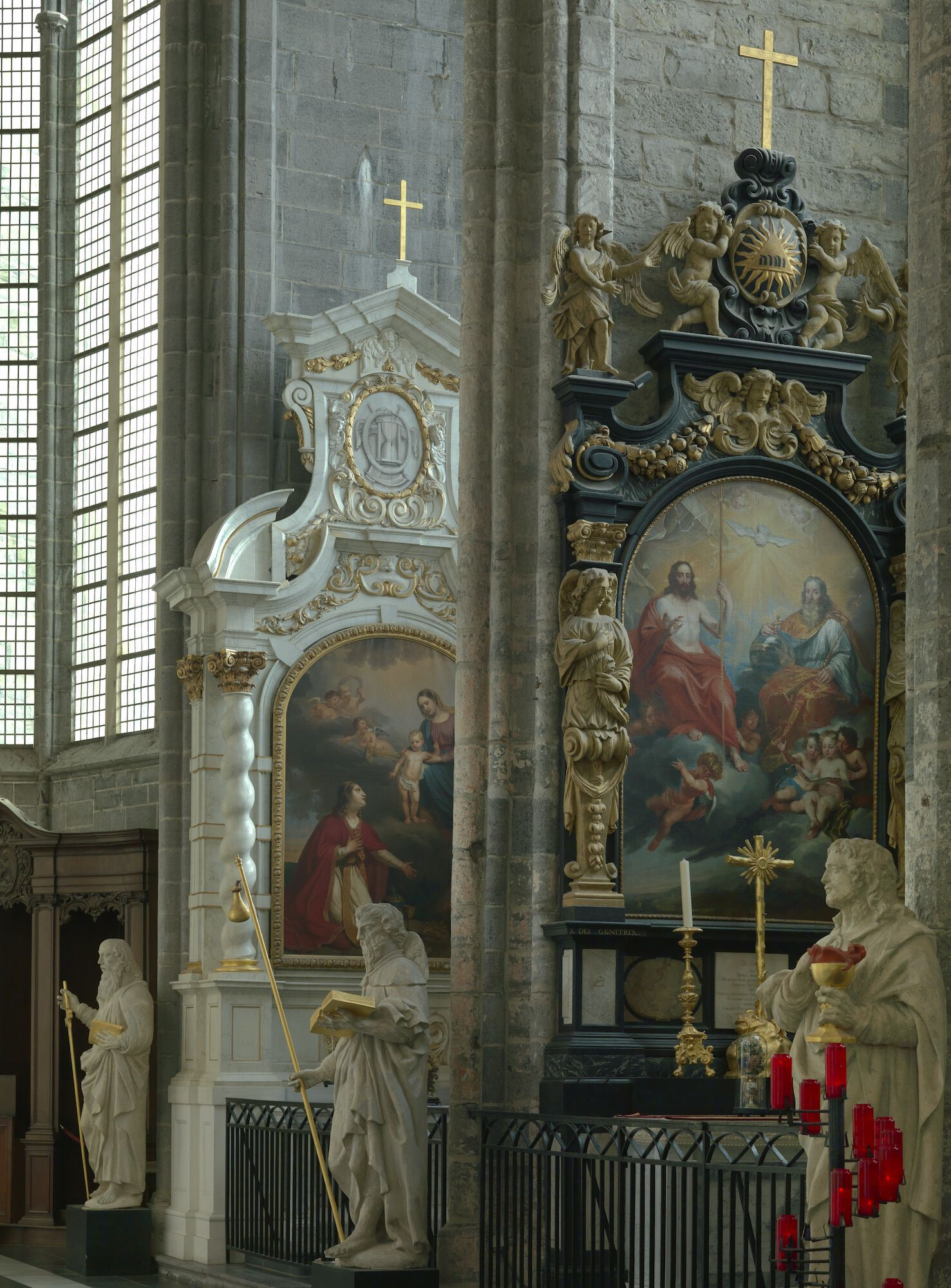
Side altars (Altar of the Holy Trinity and Altar of the Faithful Souls)-last quarter of the 17th century

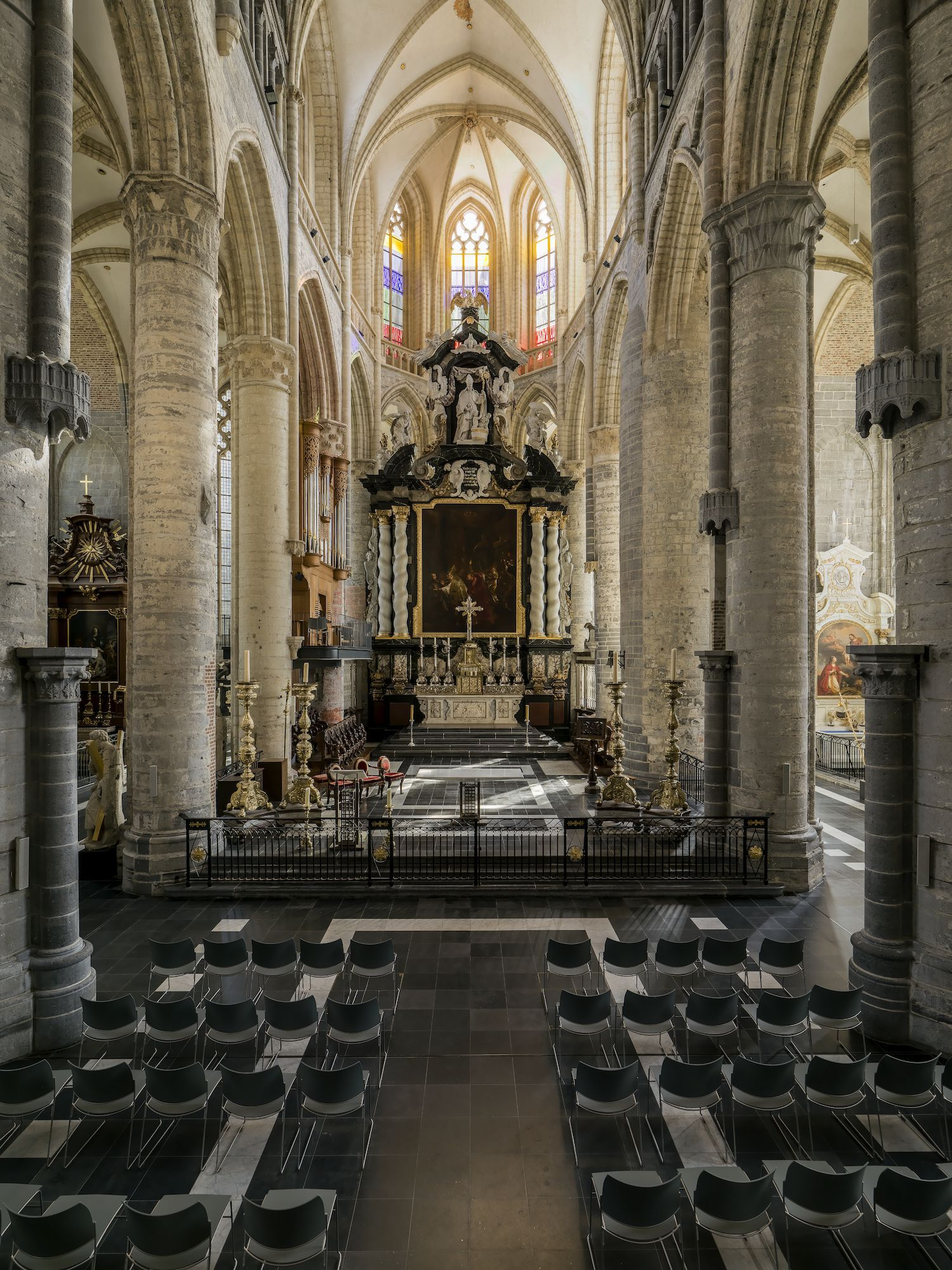
Central nave

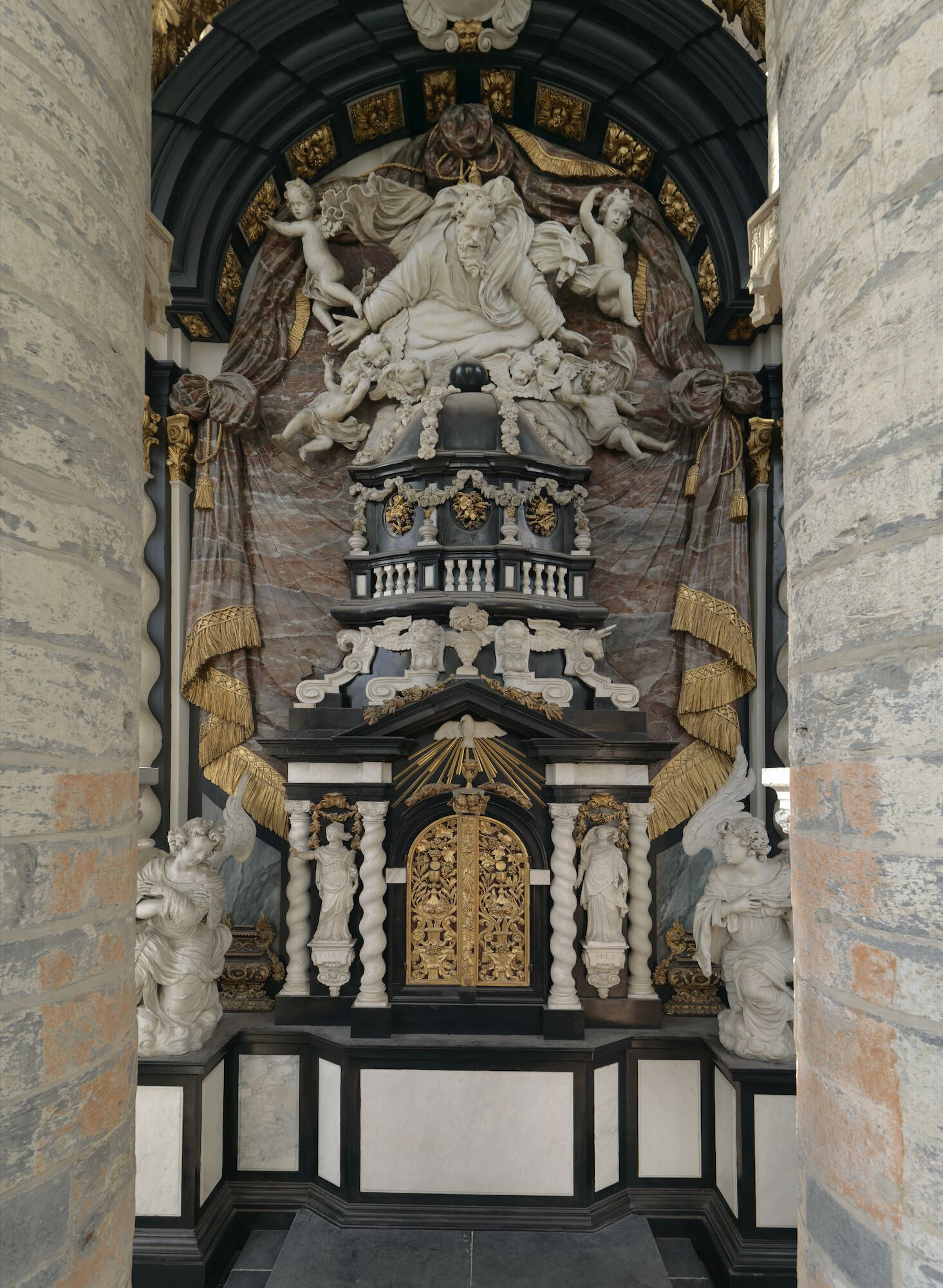
Rear of the main altar in the ambulatory

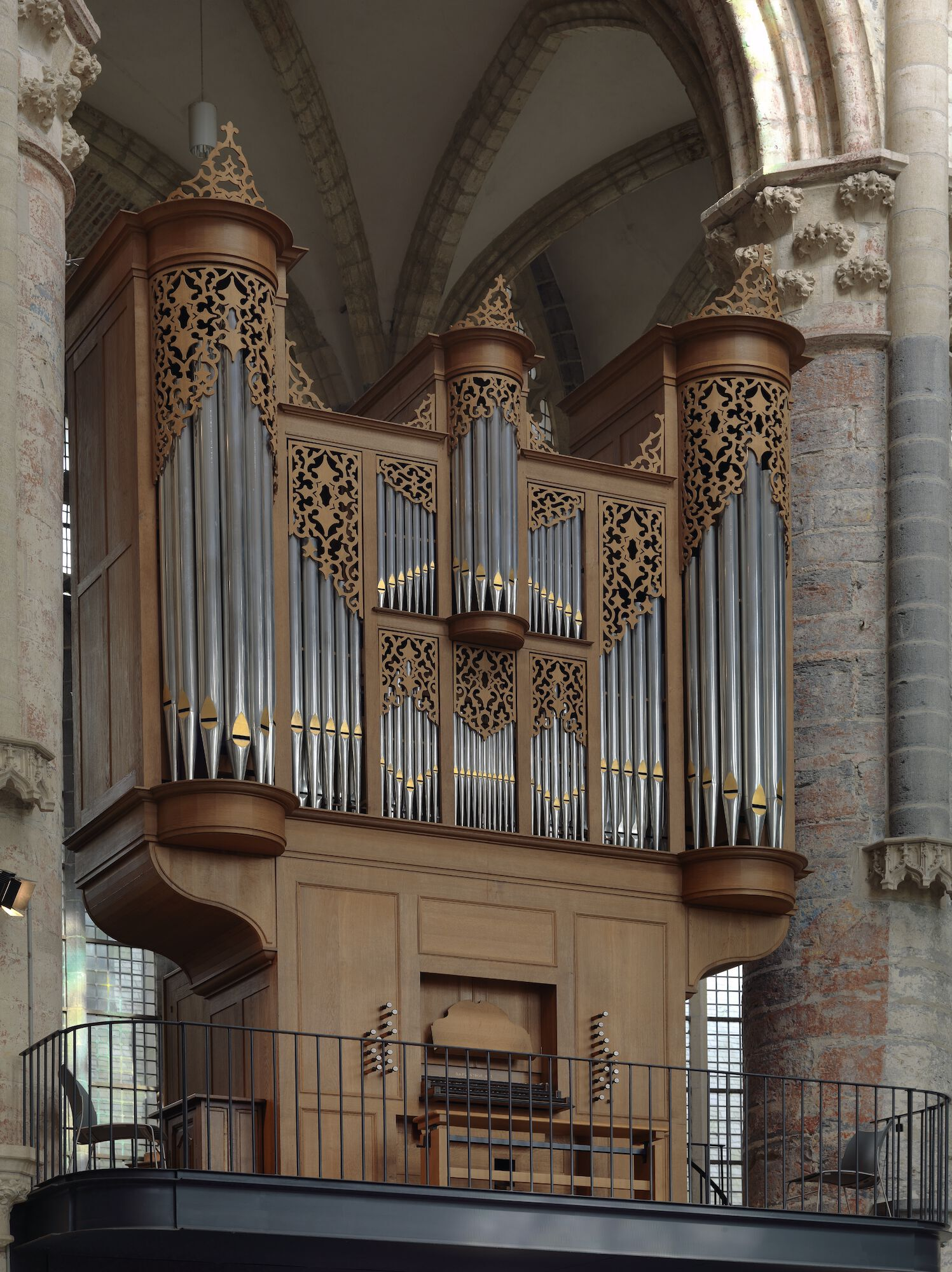
organ

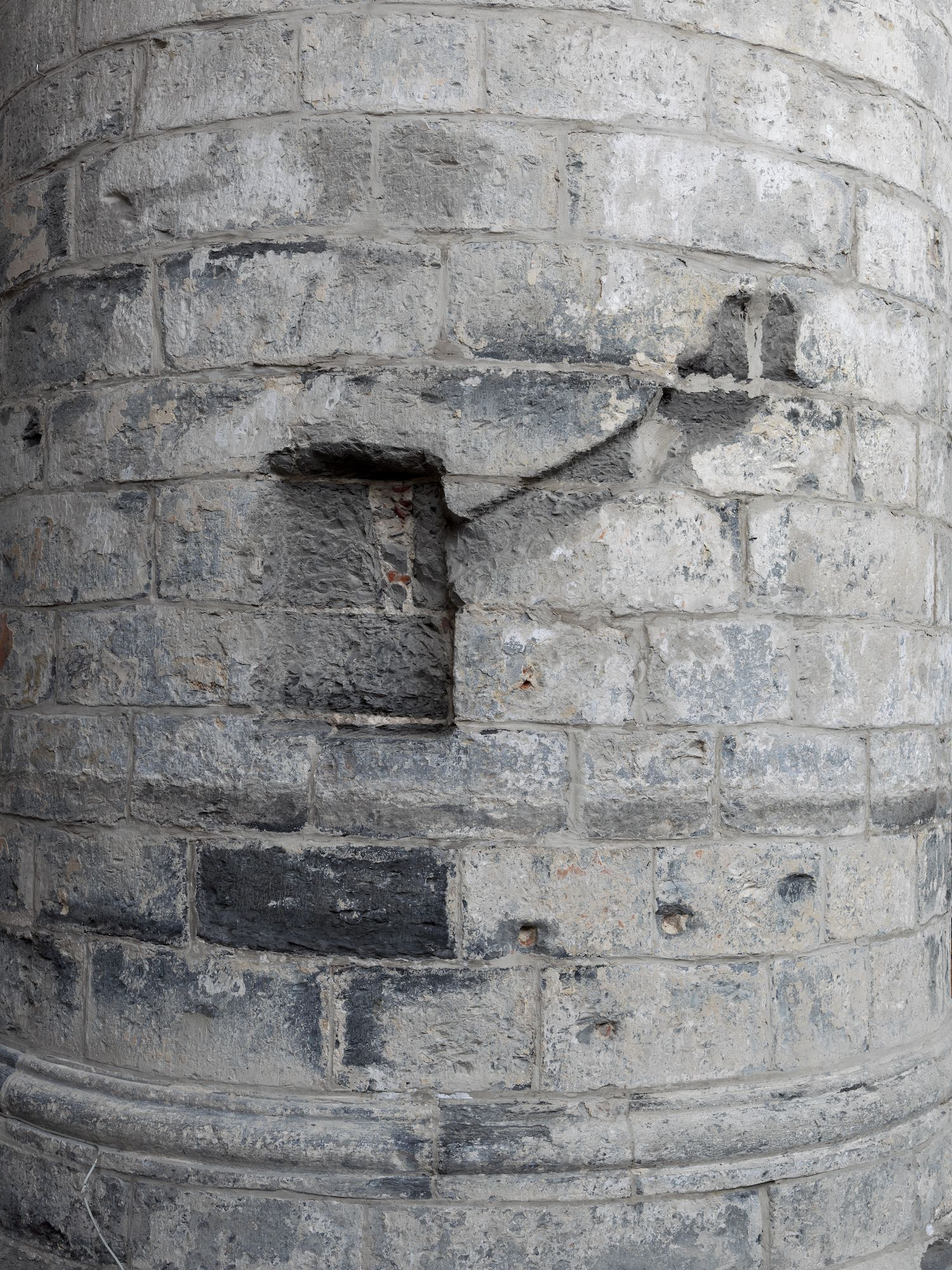
Interior

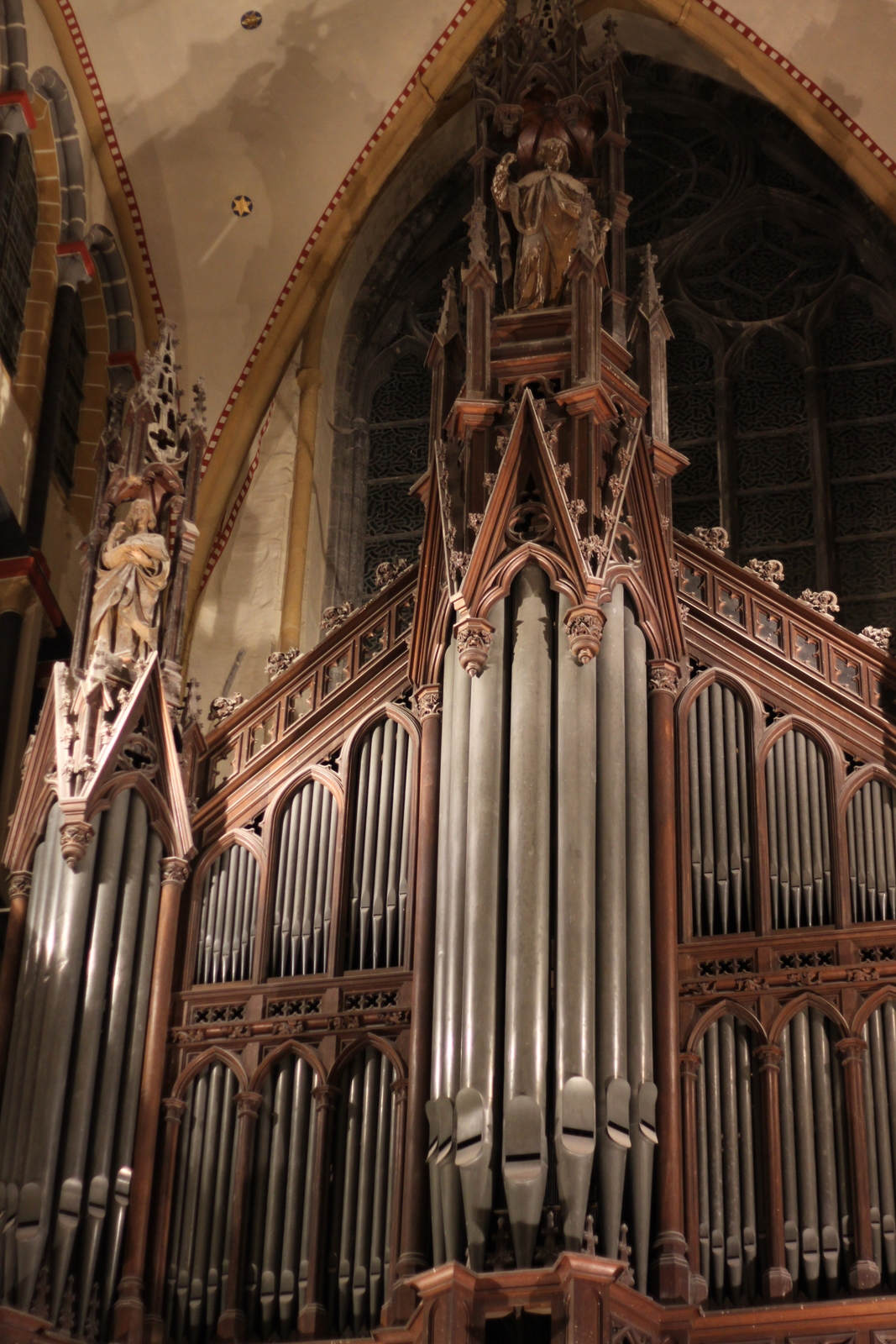
Cavaillé-Coll organ

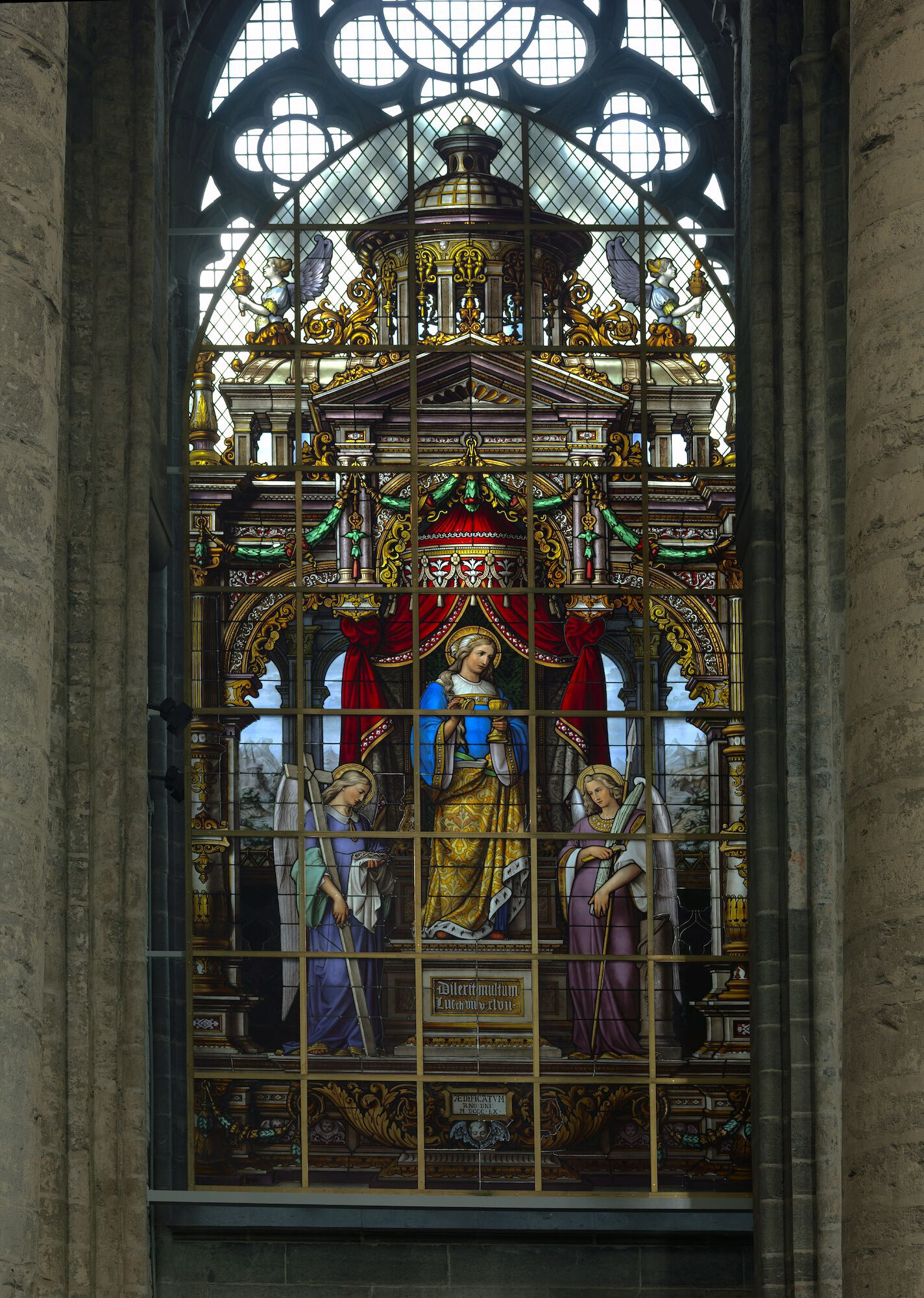
Stained glass window of the Allegory of the Passion of Jesus by Jean Baptiste Capronnier

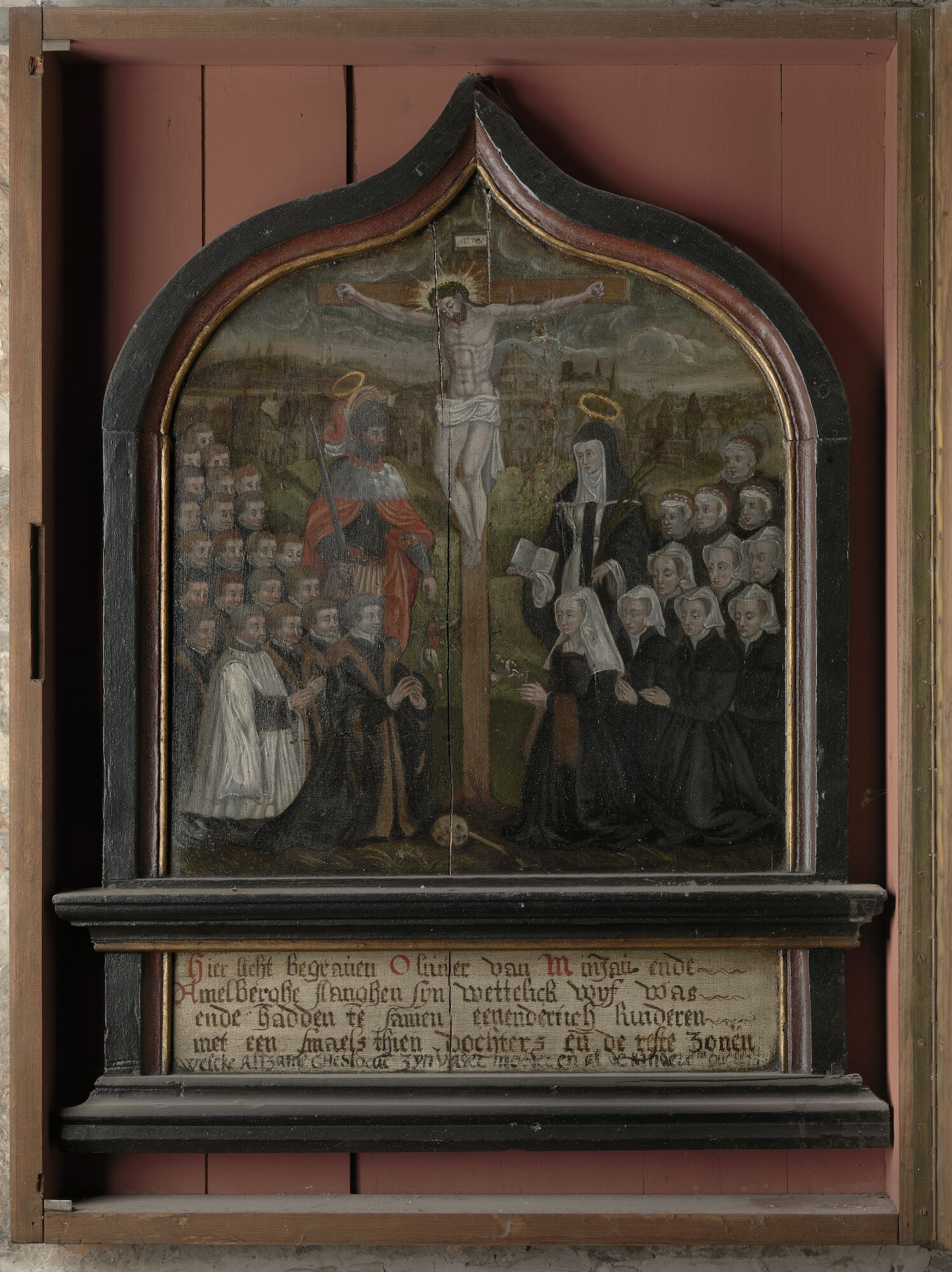
Epitaph of Olivier van Minjau and family

== See also ==
- List of tallest structures built before the 20th century
