= Belfry of Ghent =

Medieval bell tower and UNESCO World Heritage Site in Ghent, Belgium

UNESCO World Heritage Site
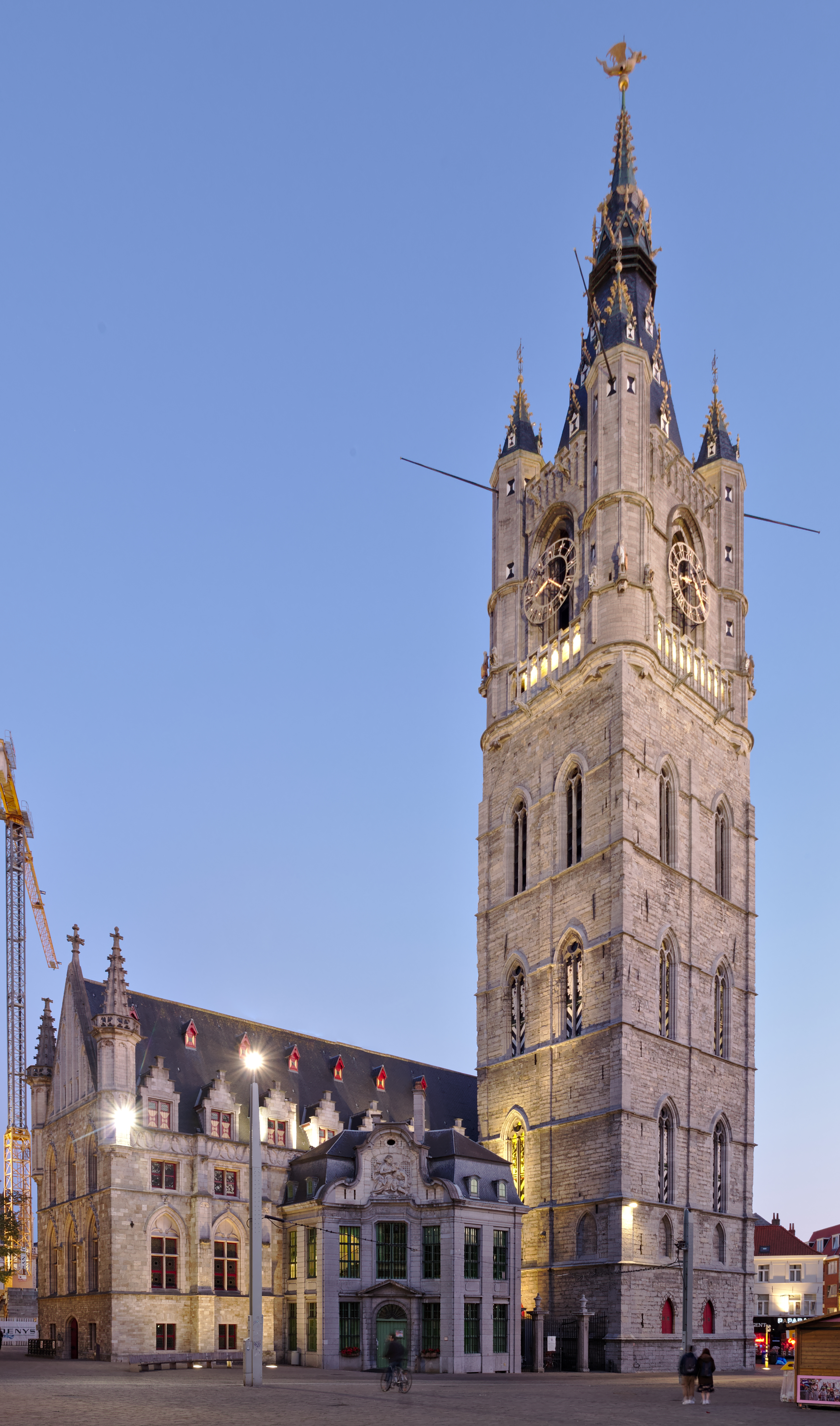
- Belfry of Ghent, beside cloth hall and (smaller) Mammelokker

- Location within Belgium
- Official name: Belfort, Lakenhal en Mammelokker (ancienne prison)
- Location: Ghent, East Flanders, Belgium
- Part of: Belfries of Belgium and France
- Criteria: Cultural: (ii), (iv)
- Reference: 943bis-008
- Inscription: 1999 (23rd Session)
- Extensions: 2005
- Area: 0.182 ha (0.45 acres)
- Buffer zone: 700 ha (1,700 acres)
- Coordinates: 51°3′14″N 3°43′31″E

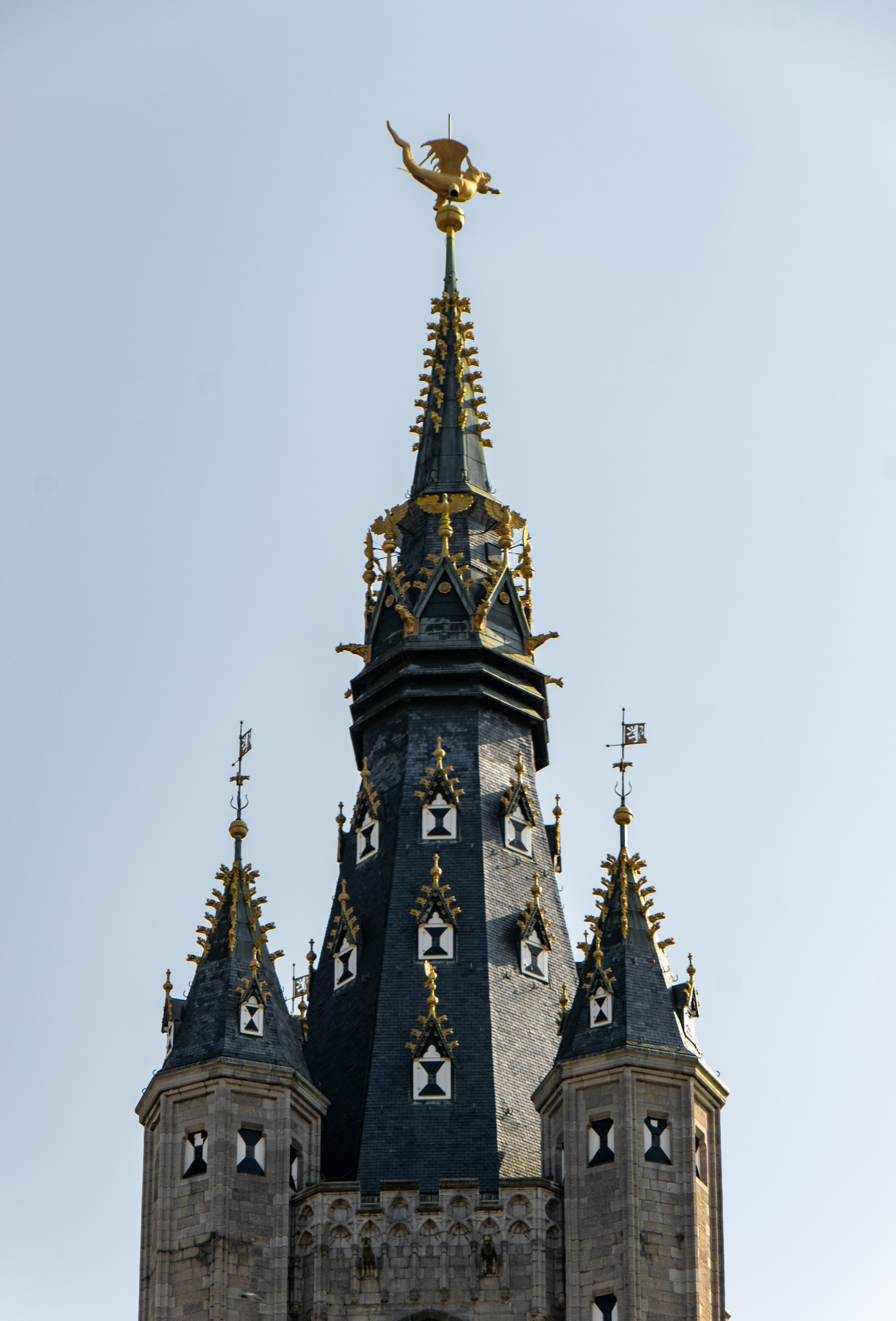
Spire topped with gilded dragon

The Belfry of Ghent (Dutch: Belfort van Gent) is one of three medieval towers that overlook the old city centre of Ghent, Belgium; the other two belonging to Saint Bavo's Cathedral and Saint Nicholas' Church. Its height of 91 metres (299 ft) makes it the tallest belfry in Belgium. The belfry of Ghent, together with its attached buildings, belongs to the set of Belfries of Belgium and France, a UNESCO World Heritage Site.

== Construction history ==
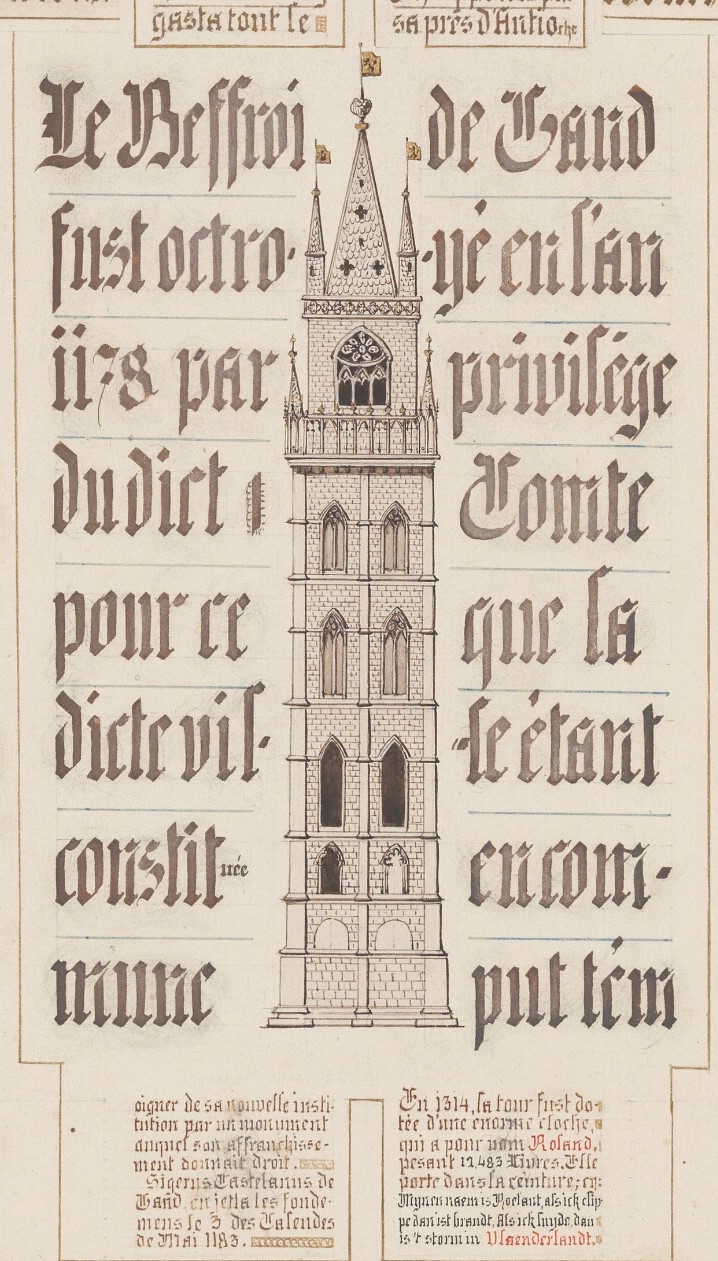
Miniature of the Belfry of Ghent in the 19th century. Excerpt from the manuscript Gand et Flandre by Bruno Christiaenssens, 1844, with chronicles, maps, miniatures and monuments

Construction of the tower began in 1313 after a design by master mason Jan van Haelst. His plans are still preserved in the Ghent City Museum. After continuing intermittently through wars, plagues and political turmoil, the work reached completion in 1380. It was near the end of this period that the gilded dragon, brought from Bruges (in fact the Dragon was made in Ghent and was placed on top of the tower in 1377), assumed its place atop the tower. The uppermost parts of the building have been rebuilt several times, in part to accommodate the growing number of bells.

The local architect Lieven Cruyl made a design for a Baroque spire in 1684. His design was not implemented and in 1771 the campanile was finished with a spire after a design by architect Louis 't Kindt. A neo-Gothic spire of cast iron was placed on the tower in 1851. This iron spire was demolished between 1911-1913 and replaced by the current stone spire. The works were carried out under the direction of Valentin Vaerewijck whose designs were inspired by the original design from the 14th century.

== Role ==
Through the centuries, the belfry served not only as a bell tower to announce the time and various warnings, but also as a fortified watchtower and the place where the documents evidencing the municipal privileges were kept.

The bells in the belfry originally only served a religious purpose. Gradually the bells got a secular role by regulating daily life in the growing medieval city. The alarm bell Roland (an Anglicization of the Dutch name Roeland), which was installed in the Belfry in 1325, was also used as the hourly bell from 1378 onwards. The hourly chime was preceded by warning signals on three smaller bells with various tones. This was the predecessor of the carillon. The carillon was built by the famous bellfounders Pieter and François Hemony in the 17th century and has a total weight of 30 tons. The carillon gradually expanded to 53 bells after its restoration in 1982. In 1993 another bell, called Robert, with a clear sound was added to the carillon.

The primary bell in the tower which is also the tower's bourdon bell is named Roland, it was also used to warn the citizens of Ghent of an approaching enemy or a battle won. After subduing Ghent, which had risen up against him, Charles V, Holy Roman Emperor ordered the removal of Roland. Henry Wadsworth Longfellow referred to Roland in his poem The Belfry of Bruges:

Till the bell of Ghent responded o'er lagoon and dike of sand,
I am Roland! I am Roland! there is victory in the land!

The bell is also the primary character in the city's anthem, in which the bell warns of fire or calls upon the citizens of Ghent to defend the land.

== Cloth hall and Mammelokker ==
The rectangular hall adjoining the belfry was built to headquarter the affairs of the cloth trade that made the city rich during the Middle Ages. Inside, woollens were officially inspected and measured; transactions were negotiated. As the cloth industry lost importance, the hall drew new occupants, including a militia guild and a fencing school. The cloth hall's construction started in 1425 and ended 20 years later, with only seven of eleven planned bays completed. In 1903, the structure was extended by four bays in accordance with the original plan.

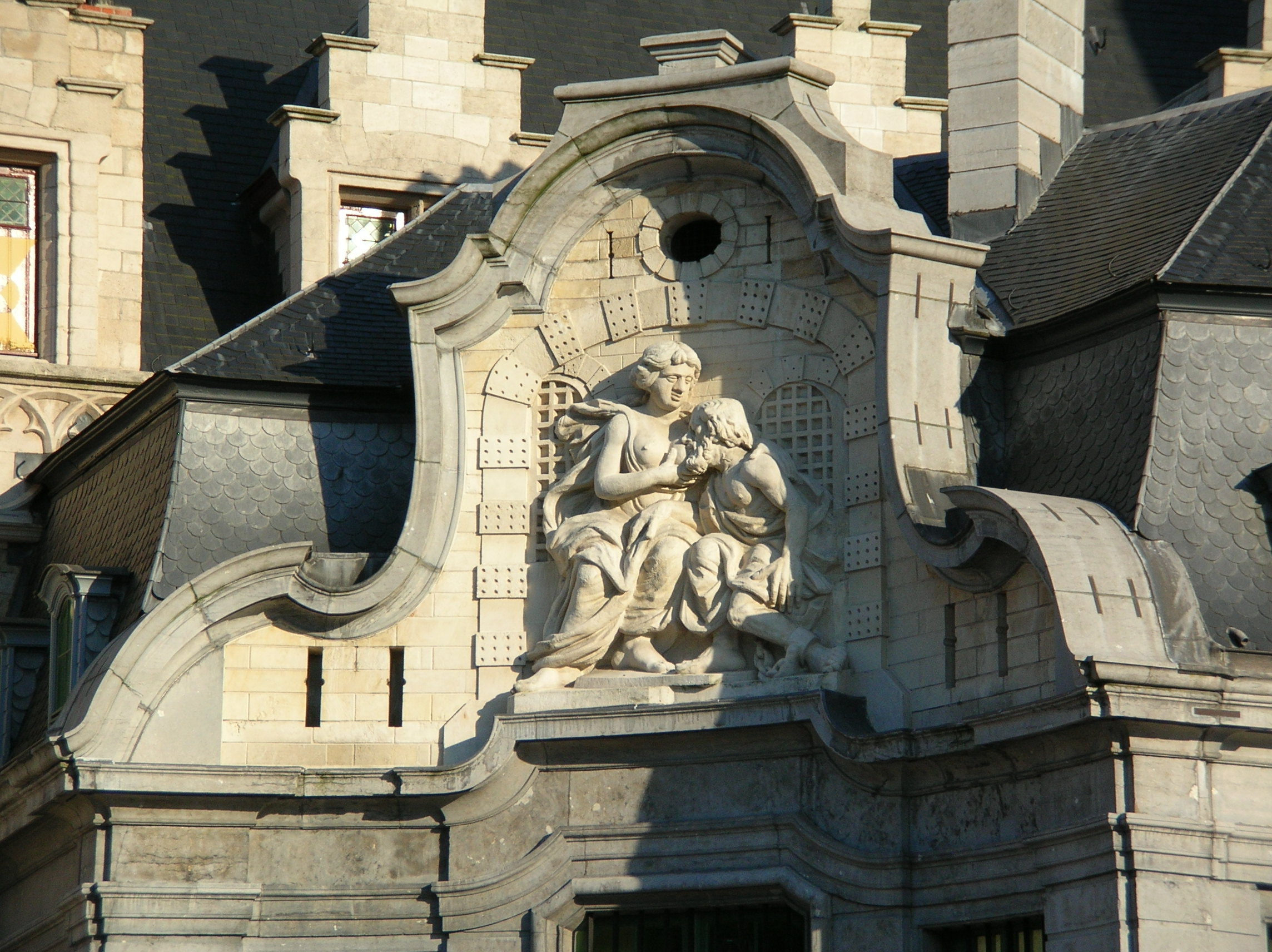
Statue depicting the Mammelokker legend

A small annex dating from 1741, called the Mammelokker, served as the entrance and guard's quarters of the city jail that occupied part of the old cloth hall from 1742 to 1902. The name refers to the sculpture of Roman Charity poised high above the front doorway. It depicts the Roman legend regarding a prisoner called Cimon. Cimon was sentenced to death by starvation, but survived and ultimately gained his freedom thanks to his daughter Pero, a wet nurse who secretly breastfed him during her visits. Her act of selflessness impressed officials and won her father's release. The term 'mammelokker' translates as 'breast sucker'.

== Gallery ==
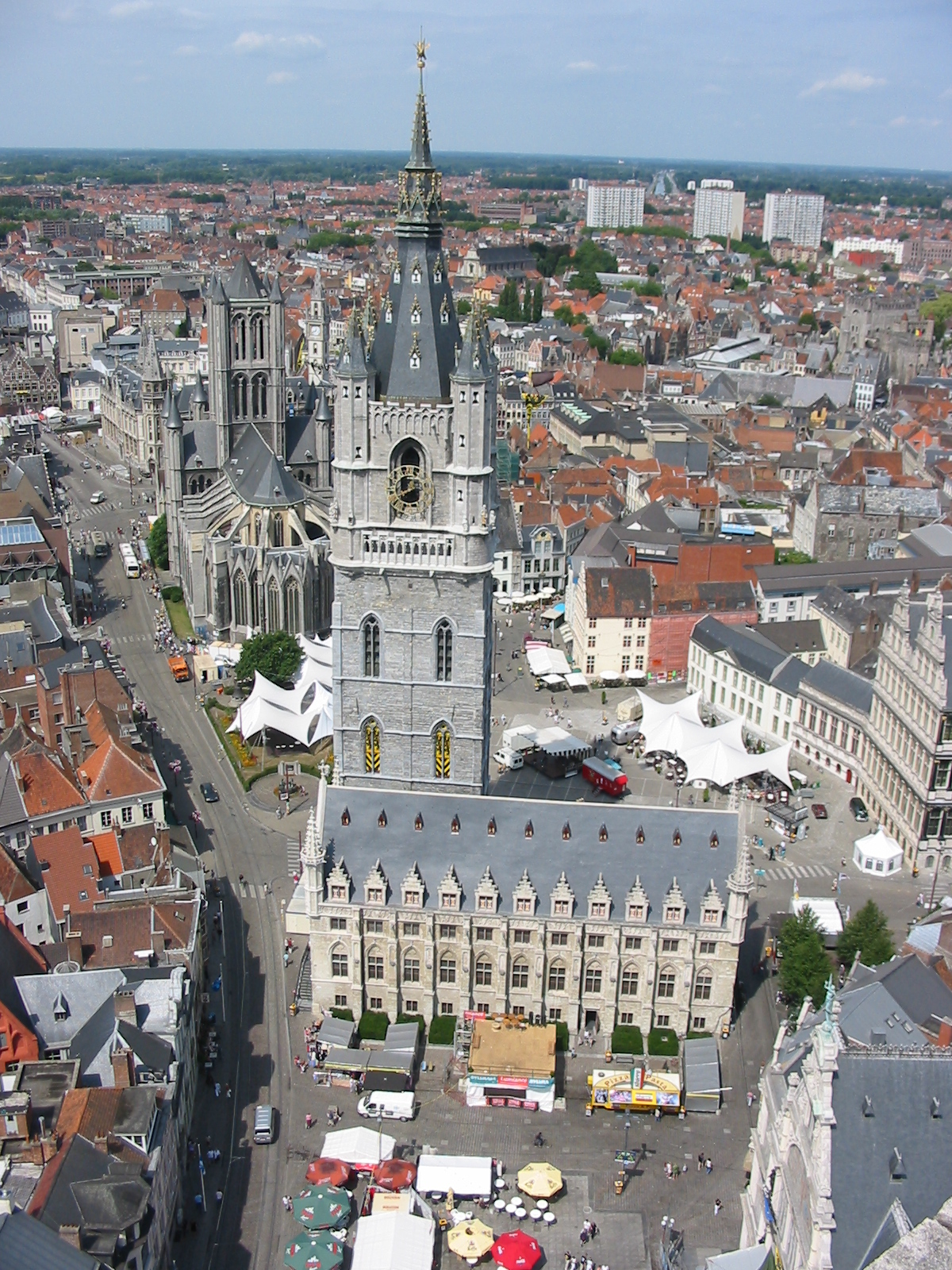
Belfry of Ghent, Saint Nicholas' Church in the background

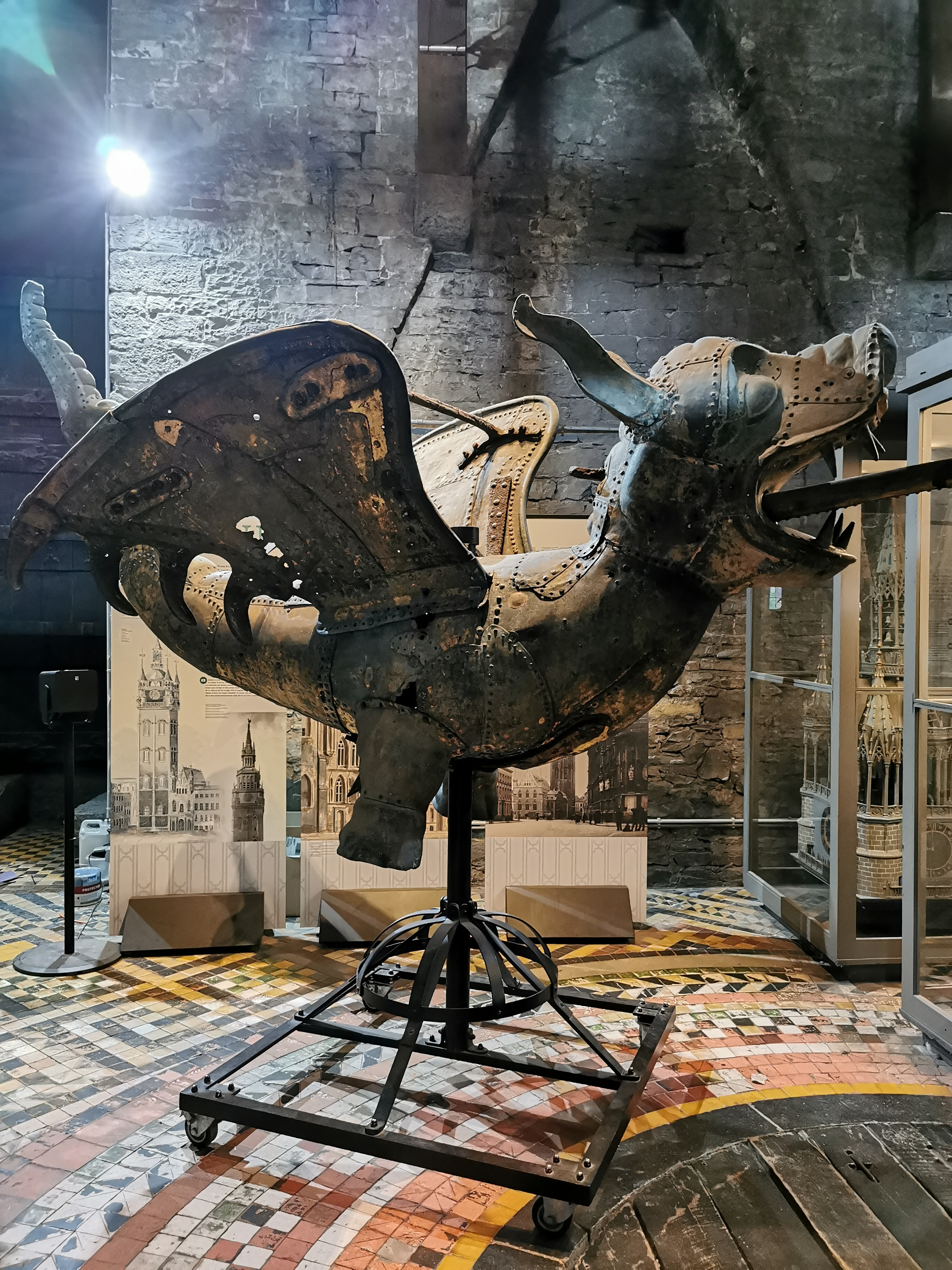
Gilded copper dragon inside the Belfry, constructed 1377–78

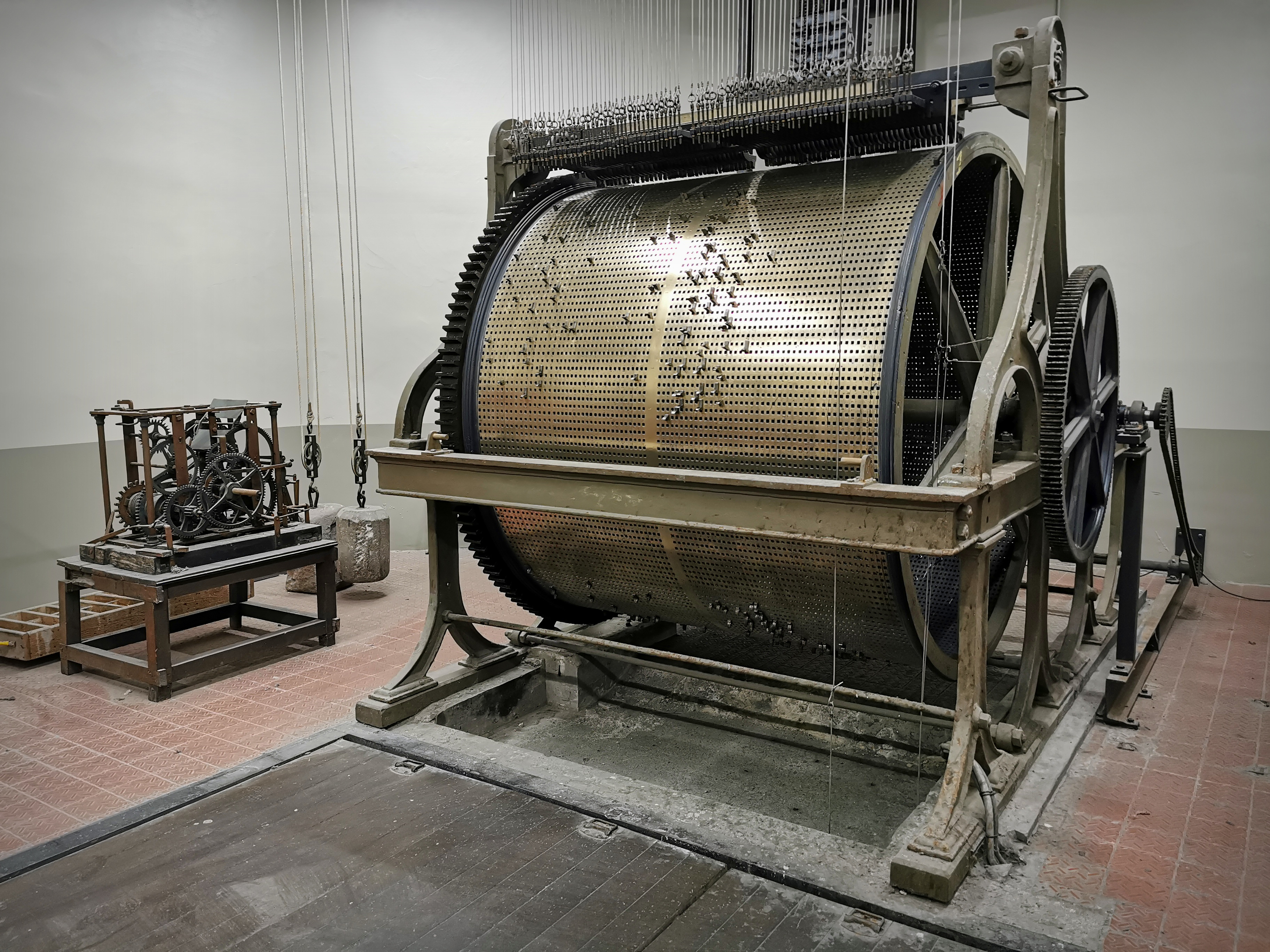
The "score" of the carillon inside the Belfry

== See also ==
- List of carillons in Belgium
- List of tallest structures built before the 20th century
