= Hotel d'Hane-Steenhuyse =

Grand townhouse in Belgium

Coordinates: 51°03′06″N 3°43′18″E

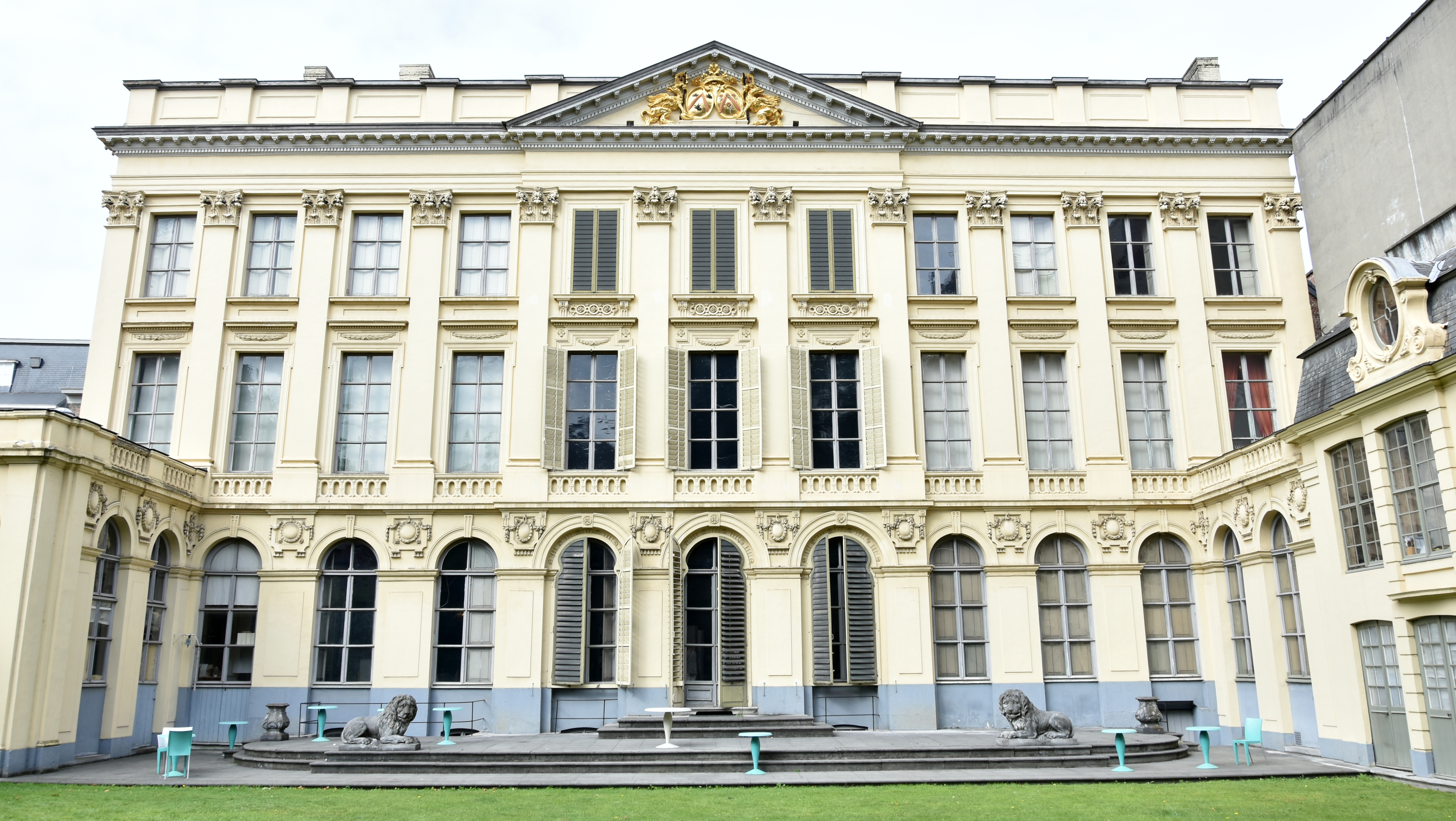
- Rear view of the Hotel d'Hane-Steenhuyse
- Interactive map of the Hotel d'Hane-Steenhuyse area

The Hotel d'Hane-Steenhuyse is an 18th-century hôtel particulier (grand townhouse) in the Belgian city of Ghent. It is located in the Veldstraat and was formerly owned by the D'Hane de Steenhuyse family.

== History ==
The building was built in 1768–1773 by Jan Baptist Simoens, who designed and built the rear facade and the salle à l'italienne. The facade may have been designed by David 't Kindt, but archival evidence of this has not been found. Around the beginning of the 19th century, the nobility used the building. In 1815, King Louis XVIII, in exile from France, resided in and held court from the hotel. Afterward he thanks his host with the gifts of a porcelain dessert service that is now kept in the Ghent City Museum ("STAM").

In the twentieth century the hotel fell into disuse. In 1949, it housed the unsuccessful Museum of the Hundred Days.

In 1981, the city of Ghent acquired the building, which it used first as an information center and later as the Monuments Management Service. In the 1990s, it underwent a thorough renovation, but public access remained limited. In 2015, the ground floor was opened for commercial activities. As of 2025, the building is open to the public on weekends as a house museum.

=== Owners ===
Three generations of the D'Hane de Steenhuyse family built the hotel:

- Count Emmanuel Ignace d'Hane (1702–1771): main building and facade
- Count Pierre Emmanuel d'Hane de Leeuwergem (1726–1786): extension and garden facade
- Count Jean-Baptiste d'Hane de Steenhuyse (1757–1826): decoration and interior decoration

After the extinction of the male line, the building passed into the hands of Valerie van Pottelsberghe de la Potterie.

=== Famous guests ===
Under Jean-Baptiste the building was visited by various famous European figures:

- 1803: Talleyrand, who accompanied first consul Bonaparte during his visit to the former Austrian Netherlands
- 1811: Jérôme Bonaparte, King of Westphalia
- 1814: Alexander I, tsar of Russia
- 1814: John Quincy Adams, at a dinner for the English and American delegations who had negotiated the Treaty of Ghent
- 1815: Louis XVIII, the French king fleeing from Napoleon during the Hundred Days
- 1815: François René de Châteaubriand, member of Louis XVIII's entourage
- 1815: the newly crowned King of the Netherlands, William I, and his wife Wilhelmina during their Joyous Entry in Ghent (September 5, 1815)
- 1818: Prince William II of the Netherlands

== Description ==
=== Floor plan ===
The building was constructed on the gradually acquired plots of older houses, with a goal of maximizing utilization of the available space, leading to the irregular shape and central protrusion of the facade.

The floor plan was also adjusted to fit between neighboring buildings. Most similar hotels featured a central entrance that provided access to the vestibule. The vestibule would be oriented perpendicular to the facade, and rooms would lead off it symmetrically to the left and right.

The Hotel d'Hane-Steenhuyse, abandons this symmetrical floor plan. The only access to the building is via a carriageway, which is located at one end of the facade (directly beside an adjacent building). This alley opens onto a garden-facing enfilade located behind the building. The vestibule door opens onto the carriageway, and the vestibule is oriented perpendicularly to the carriageway and parallel to the facade.

The rooms were not only accessible individually via the vestibule, they also shared doors with one another, forming an enfilade. There was also a system of hidden passageways, allowing staff discreet access to the rooms.

In addition, the building has a courtyard with a terrace. This was laid out in 1773 in pure Louis XVI style.

=== Facades ===
The building has two facades. The main facade in Louis XV style faces the "Veldstraat". It contains both baroque and rococo elements. The facade has a protruding middle part with Corinthian half-pilasters and a segment arch pediment.

The rear facade is in neoclassical Louis XVI style. Unlike the front facade, the rear facade has three horizontal sections. The bottom section is conceived as a pedestal. The facade has pilasters and a pediment. It is adjacent to the courtyard.

=== Rooms ===
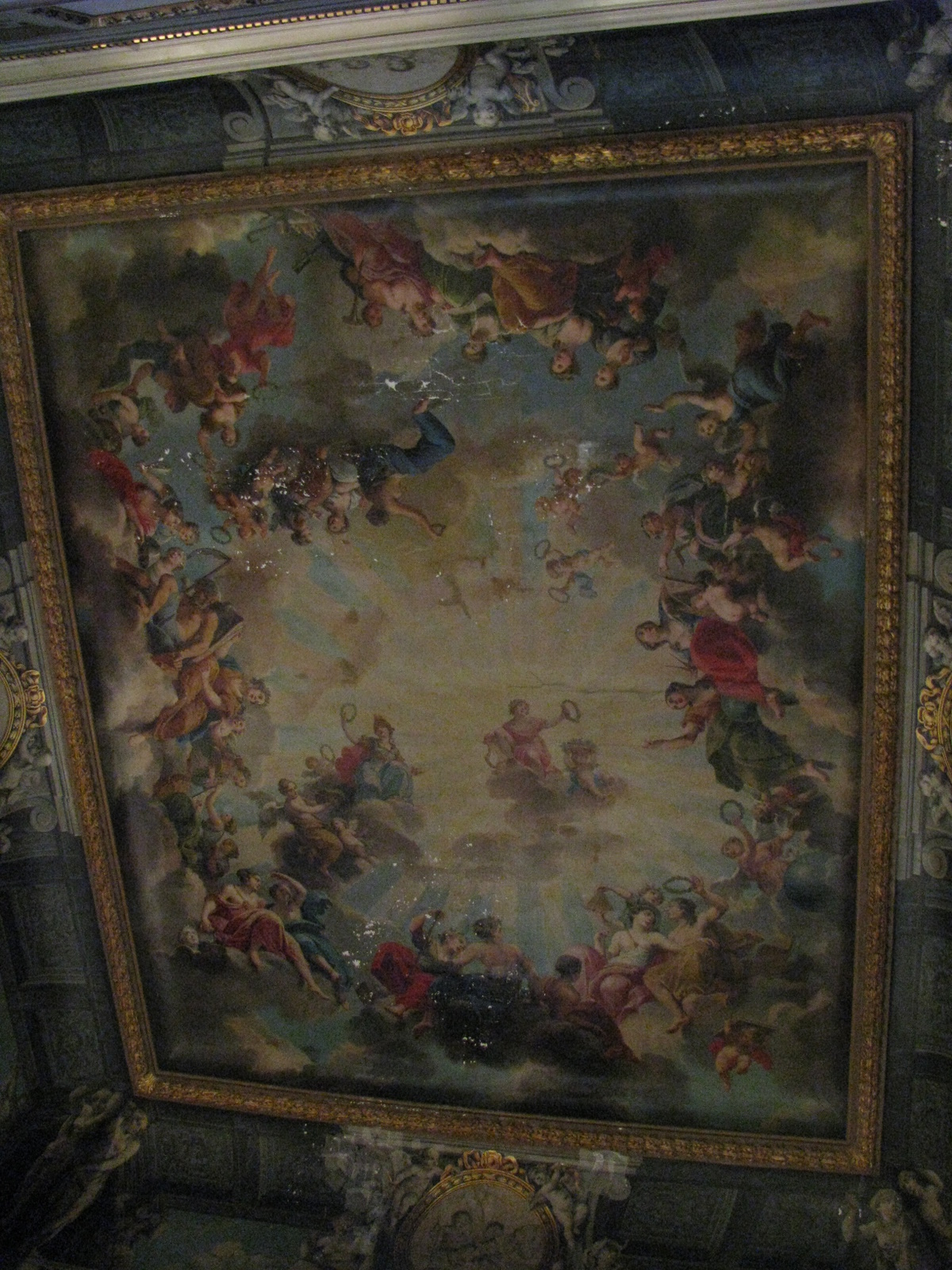
Mount Olympus, ceiling fresco by Petrus Norbertus van Reysschoot in the ballroom

The ground floor rooms were designed to be public-facing. They consist of salons and halls typical of the rich upper class society of the time. The high ballroom "à l'italienne" is particularly richly decorated, with painted ceilings, mirrors, an honorary staircase, and a parquet floor signed by Henri Feylt.

The rooms on the second floor were more modest. They include bedrooms for gentleman and the lady of the house (separate, as was common at the time), a library, a room for collections, and various other rooms. The cellars were used as service spaces. They are older than the hotel itself, and were adapted from the vaulted cellars of the houses previously occupying the site. The staff lived in unheated garret rooms.

The rooms were decorated with attention to symmetry and hierarchy. The walls were arranged as symmetrically as possible with wall panels, windows, wallpaper, and real and false doors. The wall with the chimney was considered the most important. Each room had its own color scheme. The names of the rooms, such as "boudoir", "cabinet", and the like, are heavily influenced by French terminology.

=== Art objects ===
The building is decorated with paintings by Petrus Norbertus van Reysschoot and Peter Paul Rubens, among others, as well as copies of works by Jan Brueghel the Elder.

== Sources ==
- Ed Taverne and Irmin Visser (eds.), Stedebouw: The history of the city in the Netherlands from 1500 to the present (Amsterdam: Uitgeverij SUN), 2004, ISBN 90 6168 401 3, pages 144–145
- Dirk Van de Perre and others, The architecture of lighting (Ghent, 2013)
- B. Baillieul and M. Daem (1985), The Hotel d'Hane-Steenhuyze in Ghent, in: Hand. MGOG, vol. XXXIX, pp. 173–201
- Johan Decavele (1984), French fringe to Ghent size. Civil art in Ghent in the 18th century (Ghent: Department of Cultural Affairs), 175 pages.
- The Hotel d'Hane-Steenhuyse in Ghent. Museum of the Hundred Days. Short guide (1965)
- G. Broget (1990), "About d'Hane Steenhuyse, Louis XVIII and Chateaubriand", in: Ghendtsche Tydinghen, no. XIX, pp. 238–259
- Regal acquisitions, stamgent.be, 24 March 2011 (visited 7 May 2015)
- Hotel d'Hane-Steenhuyse (ID: 25985), Inventory of the Architectural Heritage
- kikirpa.be
