= Anna-Maria van Reysschoot =

Flemish painter (1758–1850)

- Born: 17 February 1758; Ghent
- Died: 27 December 1850 (aged 92); Ghent
- Occupation: Painter
- Children: Nathalie Dignant
- Parent(s): Emanuel van Reysschoot
- Relatives: Petrus Norbertus van Reysschoot, Johannes Emanuel Van Reysschoot, Jean-Baptiste Van Reysschoot
- Family: Reysschoot family

Anna-Maria van Reysschoot (17 February 1758 – 27 December 1850) was a Flemish painter.

Anna-Maria van Reysschoot was born on 17 February 1758 in Ghent, the daughter of Emanuel Pieter Frans van Reysschoot. She came from a family of artists: her father, her brothers Petrus Norbertus van Reysschoot, Jean-Baptiste van Reysschoot, and Johannes Emanuel Van Reysschoot, and her uncle Petrus Johannes van Reysschoot were all painters.

She was trained by her brother Pieter and they and their father did decorative work for noble residences in Ghent. Her work includes mythological subjects, landscapes, and grisaille painting. From around 1792 to around 1834, she regularly exhibited at Ghent salons.

She married Egide Dignant and they had at least four children, including painter Nathalie Dignant. She spent the end of her life at the bejaartenhuis in Schreiboom. Anna-Maria van Reysschoot died on 27 December 1850 in Ghent.

== Gallery ==
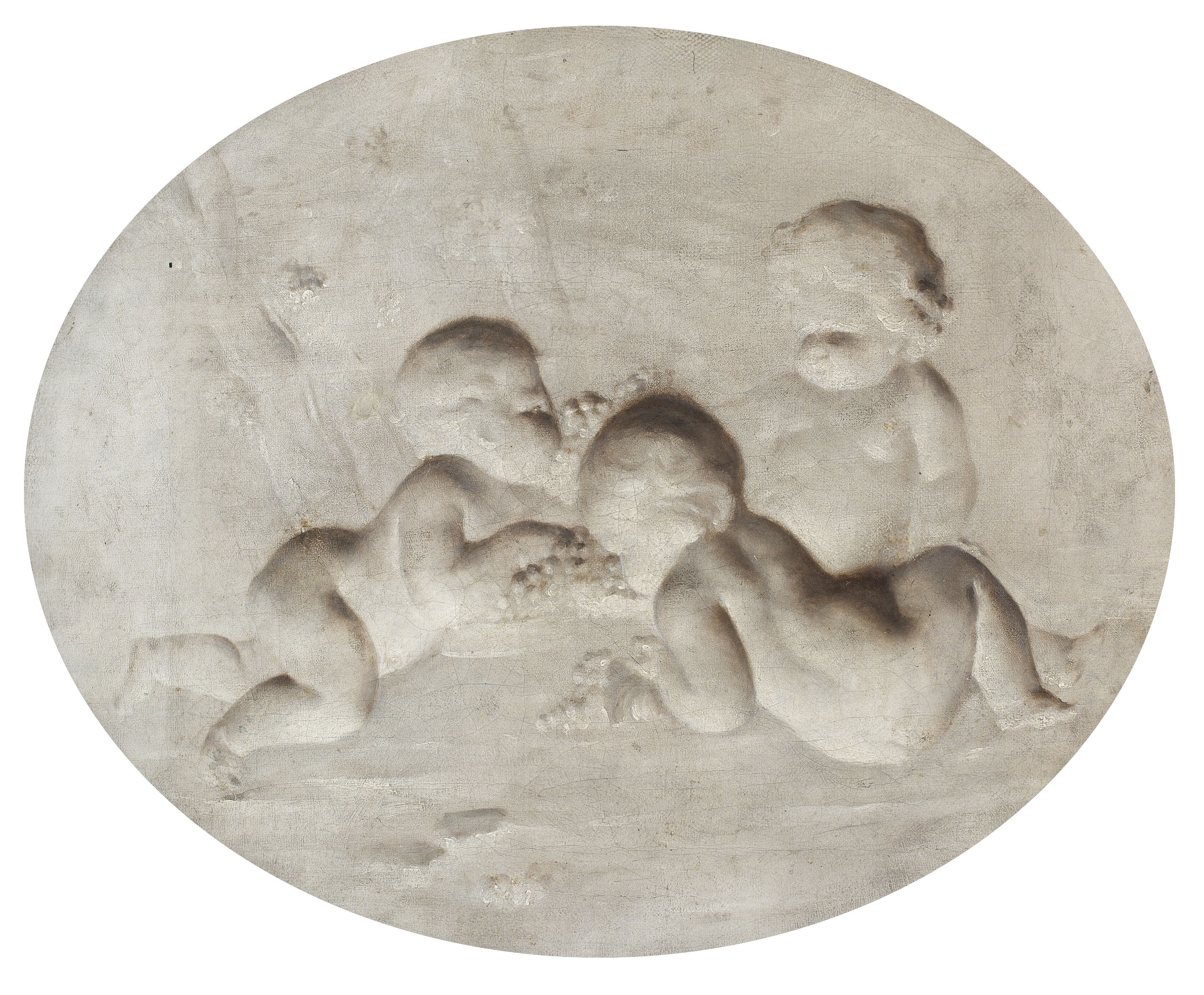
