= Bernard de Wilde =

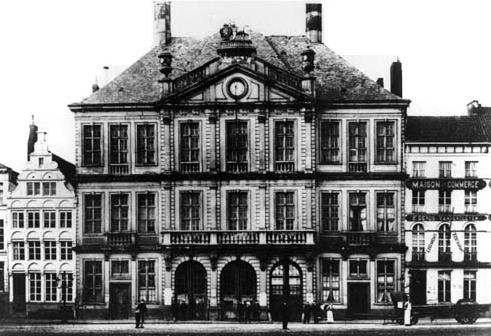
Former Pakhuis in Ghent, designed by de Wilde

Bernard de Wilde (1691 – 1772) was a Southern Netherlandish architect.

He carried out most of his work in Ghent. Together with David 't Kindt, he is the most important representative of Ghent Rococo. His works are marked by a strong French influence.

Some of his works include:

- Pakhuis on the Korenmarkt (Louis XIV style)
- Lakenmetershuis on the Vrijdagmarkt
- College building of the Augustinians, now Academy of Fine Arts
- Hotel Schamp (1721) (presumably after his design)
- Hotel Falligan on the Kouter (1755)
- Saint Sebastian Theater on the Kouter (1737)
