= Four Members =

14th-century league of Flemish cities

The Four Members (Dutch: Vier Leden) consisted of Bruges, Franc of Bruges, Ghent and Ypres gathered together in a medieval parliament. Together they exercised considerable power in Flanders.

During the Hundred Years' War, Jacob van Artevelde, a prominent merchant with business interests in the wool trade with England, led a revolt against Louis I, the Count of Flanders who had sided with the French. Originally, in 1339 he organised the towns of Bruges, Ghent and Ypres together as the Three Members (Dutch: Drie Leden). Then in 1386 under Philip the Bold, Franc of Bruges was added, turning the organisation into the Four Members.
