= Petrus Johannes van Reysschoot =

Flemish painter and printmaker

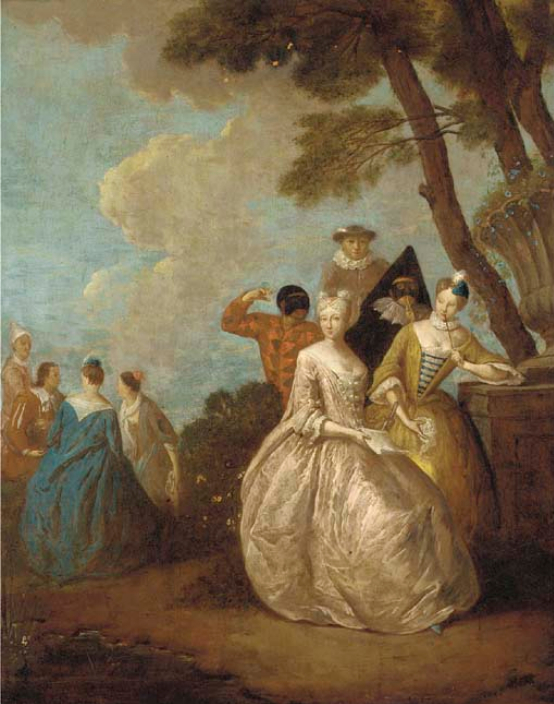
Fête champêtre with ladies seated by a tree and figures from the commedia dell'arte

Petrus Johannes van Reysschoot or Pieter van Reysschoot (Ghent, 18 January 1702 – Ghent, 22 or 24 February 1772) was a Flemish painter and printmaker who is known for his genre scenes, hunting scenes, landscapes, portraits and Christian religious subjects.

He spent a large part of his career in England, which earned him the nickname den Engelschman "the Englishman"). In England, he painted history and sporting (i.e., hunting) scenes and was a portrait painter working on commissions particularly from the Midlands gentry.

== Life ==
Petrus Johannes van Reysschoot was born in Ghent as the son of Frans and Amelberghe vanden Neste. He was the first painter in a family which would include a large number of painters in the 18th century. He studied in France where he was registered at the Académie Royale in Paris in 1730 and later won a prize.

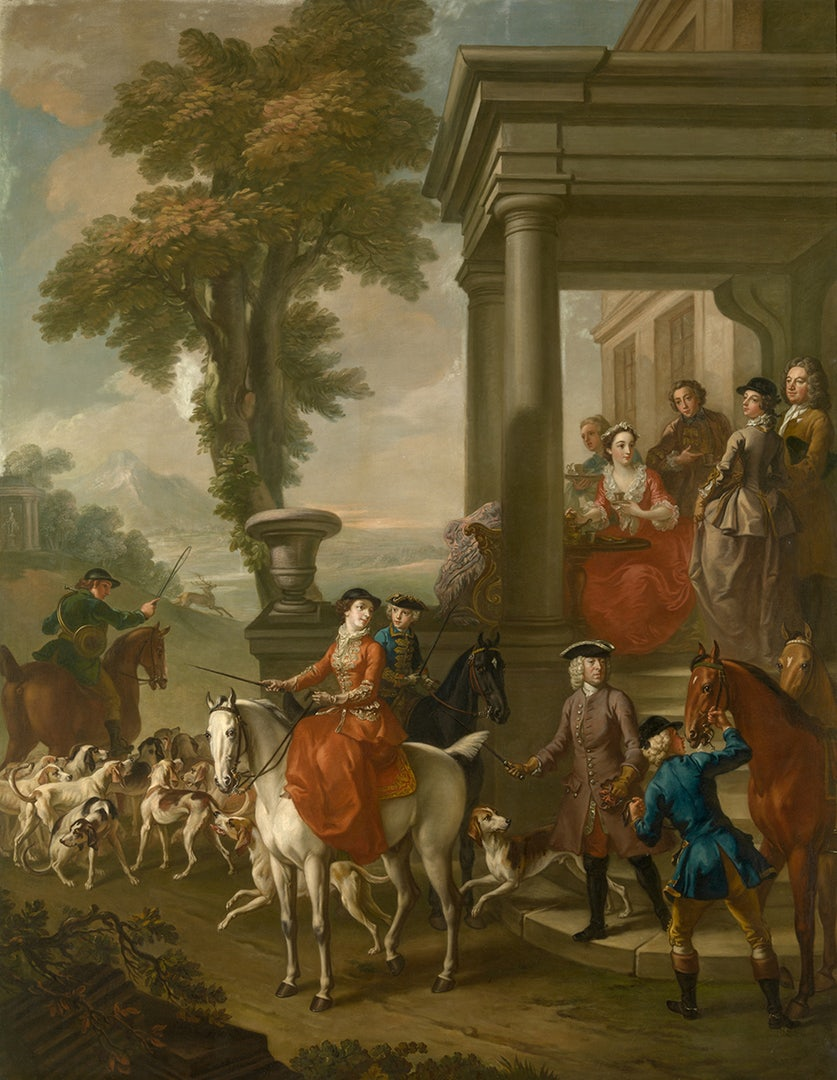
The Meet

Between circa 1736 and 1743, the artist resided and worked in England. In England, he painted history and sporting (i.e., hunting) scenes. He was also a portrait painter working on commissions, particularly from the Midlands gentry. He was later nicknamed "the Englishman" because of this long stay in England.

He returned to Ghent on the occasion of the death of his father on 27 February 1737. On 4 April of that year he attended, as godfather, the baptism of his nephew Petrus Norbertus van Reysschoot, who would become a prominent painter and art educator. By that time, he must have already have become wealthy as he bought from his seven co-heirs, for the sum of 550 livres, the paternal house called "de Maeght van Ghendt" in the Overpoortstraat, a property burdened with heavy debts.

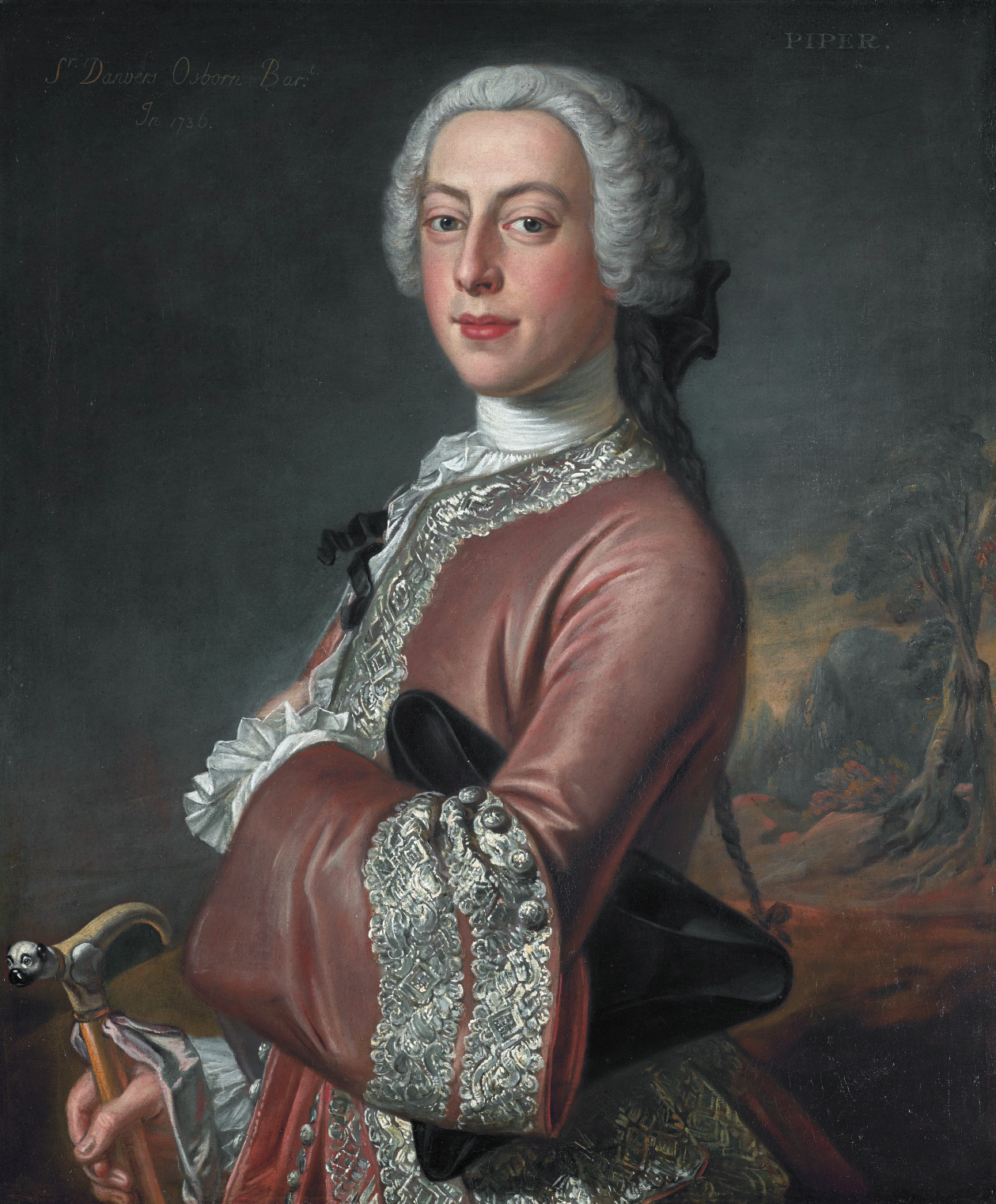
Danvers Osborn, Governor of New York

On the occasion of the installation of Maria Theresa as Countess of Flanders, the States of Flanders had decided to have four portraits of the sovereign painted which would be displayed under as many dais, two at the Ghent City Hall and in Bruges at the Brugse Vrije and the City Hall. Eleven portraits at three quarters size of these paintings were also made for the deputies of the States. By an act of the States dated 29 January 1744, the entire commission was awarded to Petrus Johannes van Reysschoot who at the time was still in London. Van Reysschoot was said to have promised to return soon to Ghent and begin the work within two months of the act.

After his return to Ghent around 1744, he became a sought after history and portrait painter. The governor of the Southern Netherlands, Prince Charles Alexander of Lorraine, visited Ghent in September 1752 and participated in the jay-shooting of the local crossbowmen's guild of Saint George. The Prince shot the jay just like his predecessor as governor Isabella had done at the jay-shooting in Brussels of 1615. Van Reysschoot was commissioned to paint a record of this feat that included portraits of the key members of the crossbowmen's guild. The painting was delivered in 1657 and placed with much pomp in the Guild Hall in November of that year. A small-scale version of the composition not including the portraits was created by the Ghent painter Filips Karel Marissal and also placed in the Guild Hall (both works are now in the Ghent City Museum).

Van Reysschoot was among the first protectors of the Ghent's Royal Academy of Fine Arts. His nephew, Petrus Norbertus van Reysschoot, became one of the most distinguished professors of this institution.

The artist died in the house on the Overpoortstraat, which had remained his property, and was buried by the care of the Alexian brothers on 26 February 1772. In the mortuary book held by the brothers, he is registered as an unmarried painter.

== Work ==
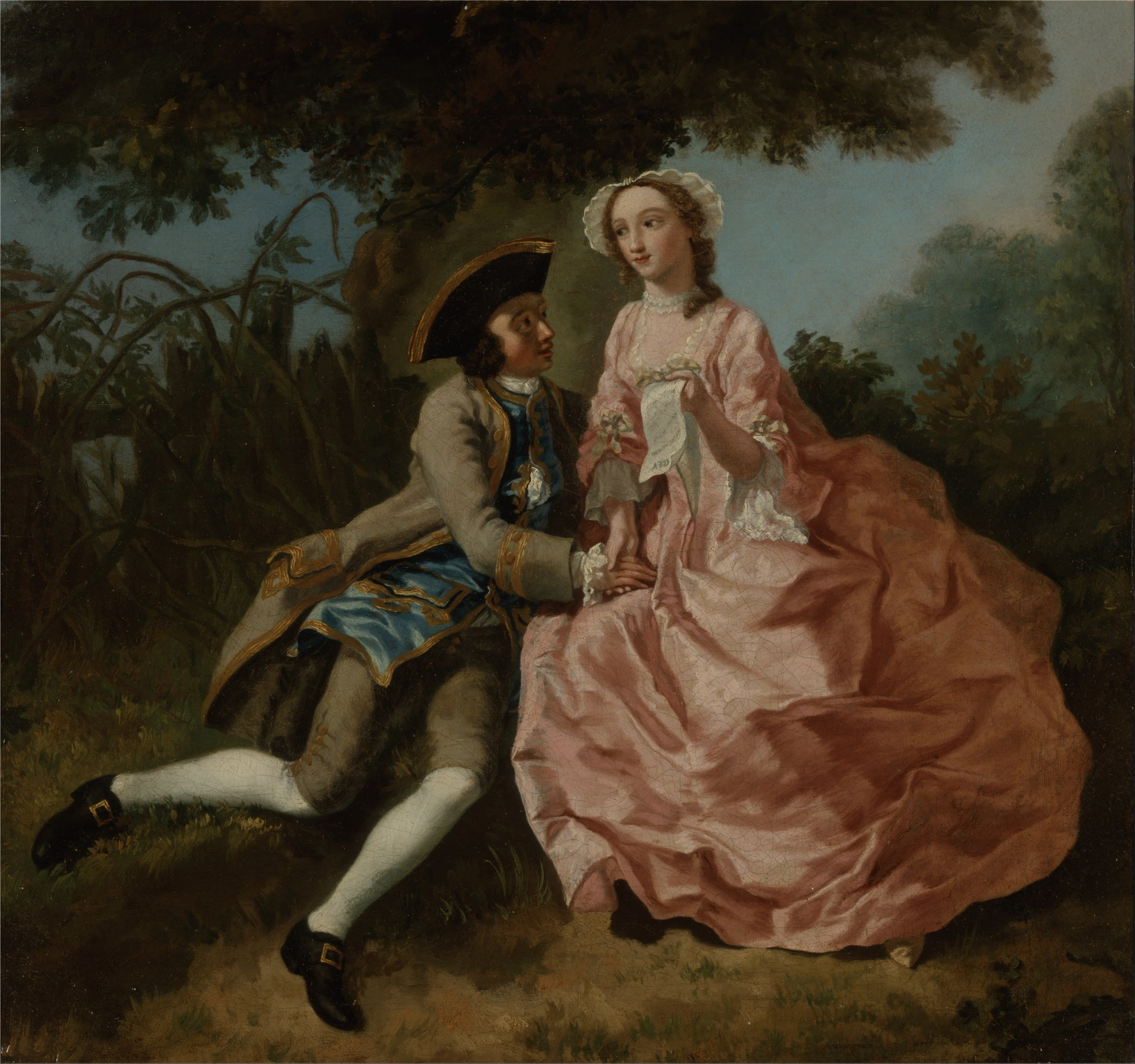
Lovers in a landscape

Petrus Johannes van Reysschoot was a prolific painter who painted genre scenes, sporting scenes, landscapes, portraits and Christian religious subjects.

He painted fête galantes and fête champêtres, which were inspired by the work of the French painter Jean-Antoine Watteau. These works typically featured figures in ball dress or masquerade costumes disporting themselves amorously in parkland settings. An example is the Fête champêtre with ladies seated by a tree and figures from the commedia dell'arte (Christie's London, South Kensington 30 October 2002 lot 86).

Van Reysschoot was much in demand for his sporting conversation pieces. This genre, which was originally introduced in England by the painter Peter Tillemans of Antwerp, had become popular with the English gentry in the 18th century. Examples are The Meet and The Kill (both in the Museum of Fine Arts, Ghent). They were painted for Sir John Frederick of Southwick Park in Hampshire. They show the lord and his party before and during a hunt at his Hascombe Estate in Surrey.
