= Jacob van Artevelde =

Flemish statesman and political leader (d. 1345)

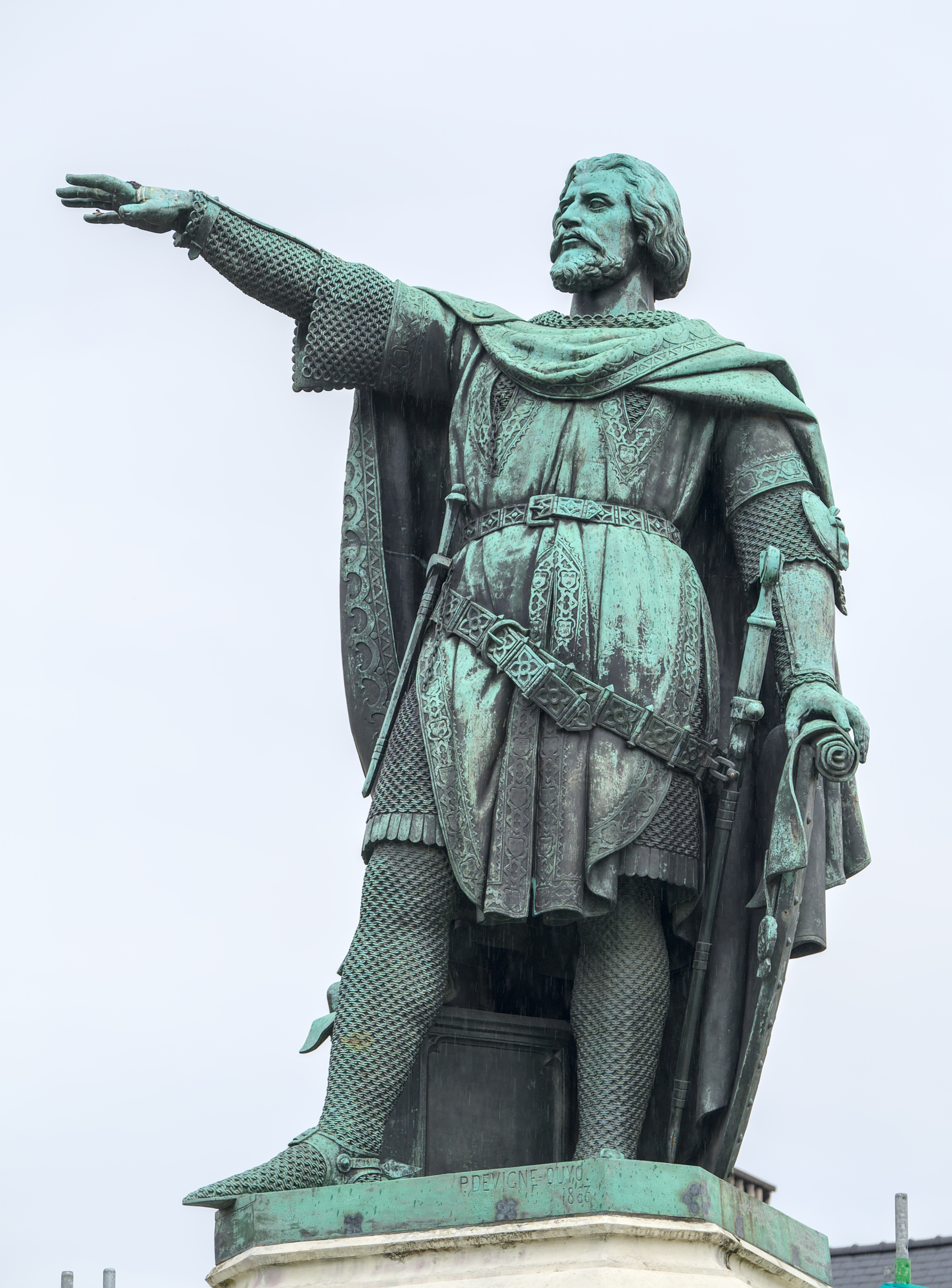
- Statue (DeVigne-Quyo, 1863) of Jacob of Artevelde on the Vrijdagmarkt in Ghent
- Born: c. 1290; Ghent
- Died: 24 July 1345; Ghent
- Occupations: weaver, political leader

Jacob van Artevelde (c. 1290 – 17 or 24 July 1345), sometimes written in English as James van Artevelde, also known as The Wise Man and the Brewer of Ghent, was a Flemish statesman and political leader.

== Biography ==
Jacob Van Artevelde was born in Ghent of a wealthy commercial family. He married twice and amassed a fortune in the weaving industry. He rose to prominence during the early stages of the Hundred Years' War. Fearful that hostilities between France and England would hurt the prosperity of Ghent, he entered political life in 1337. He set up an alliance with Bruges and Ypres (later the Four Members) in order to show neutrality. Van Artevelde gained control of the insurrection against Louis I, the Count of Flanders who had abandoned his father's anti-French policies. Louis I was forced to flee to France, while van Artevelde served as captain general of Ghent from that time until his death.

Flemish relations with England had traditionally been good, due to wool and textile trade. Neutrality was eventually broken, and the towns took the side of the English in 1340. In that year, van Artevelde persuaded the federation to recognise King Edward III of England as sovereign of France and overlord of Flanders.

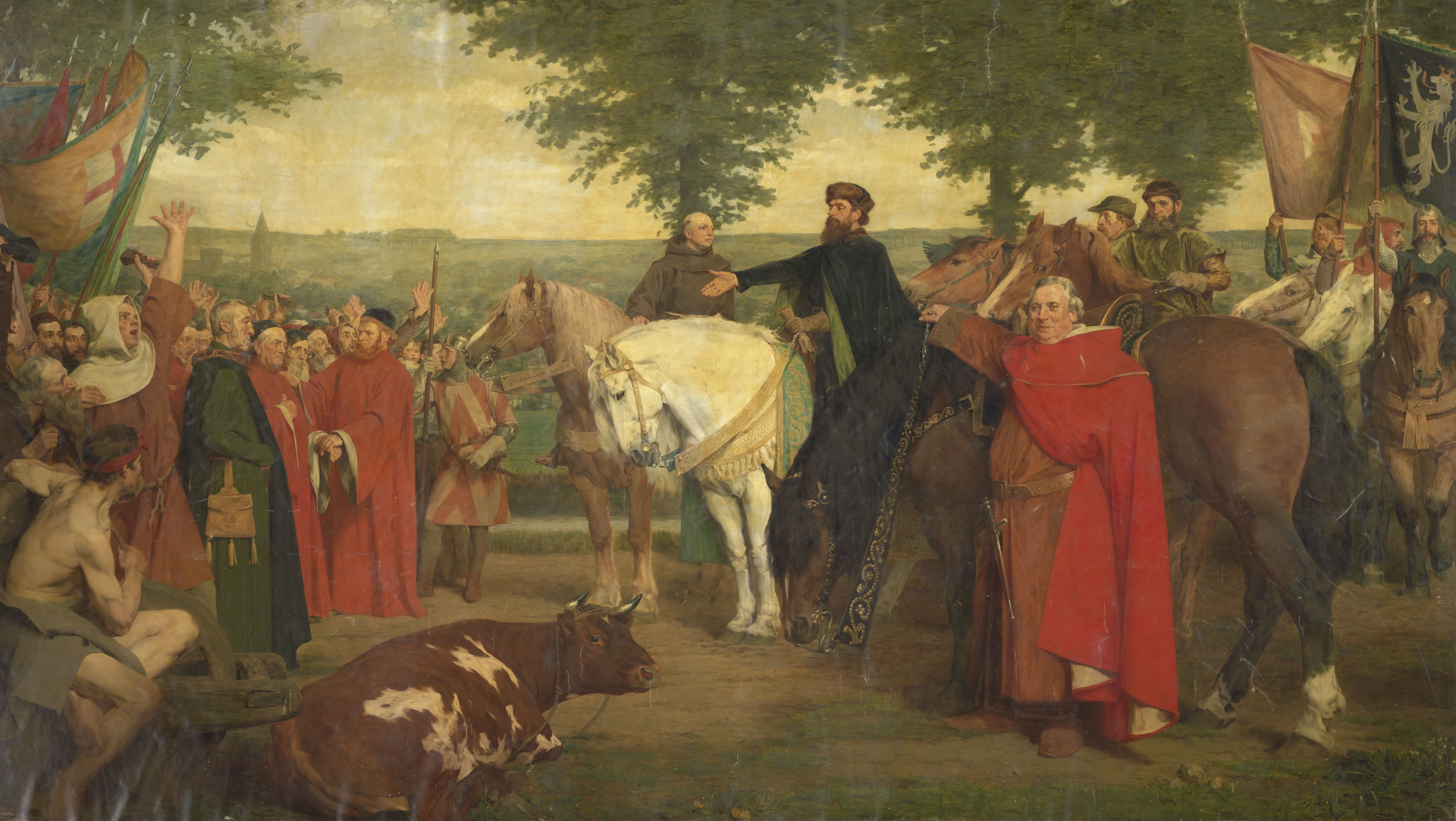
Jacob van Artevelde on horseback addressing a crowd of patricians and peasants by Gustave Vanaise

Flemish trade and industry flourished under van Artevelde's semi-dictatorial rule. In 1345, however, rumours that he planned to recognise the son of Edward III, the Black Prince, as count of Flanders, suspicion of embezzlement, and the excommunication by the Pope caused a popular uprising in Ghent, and van Artevelde was killed by an angry mob.

His son Philip van Artevelde later took up the Flemish cause and died in the Battle of Roosebeke in 1382.

== In fiction ==
Artevelde is a supporting character in Les Rois maudits (The Accursed Kings), a series of French historical novels by Maurice Druon. He was portrayed by Christian Barbier in the 1972 French miniseries adaptation of the series.
