= Petrus Norbertus van Reysschoot =

Flemish painter (1738–1795)

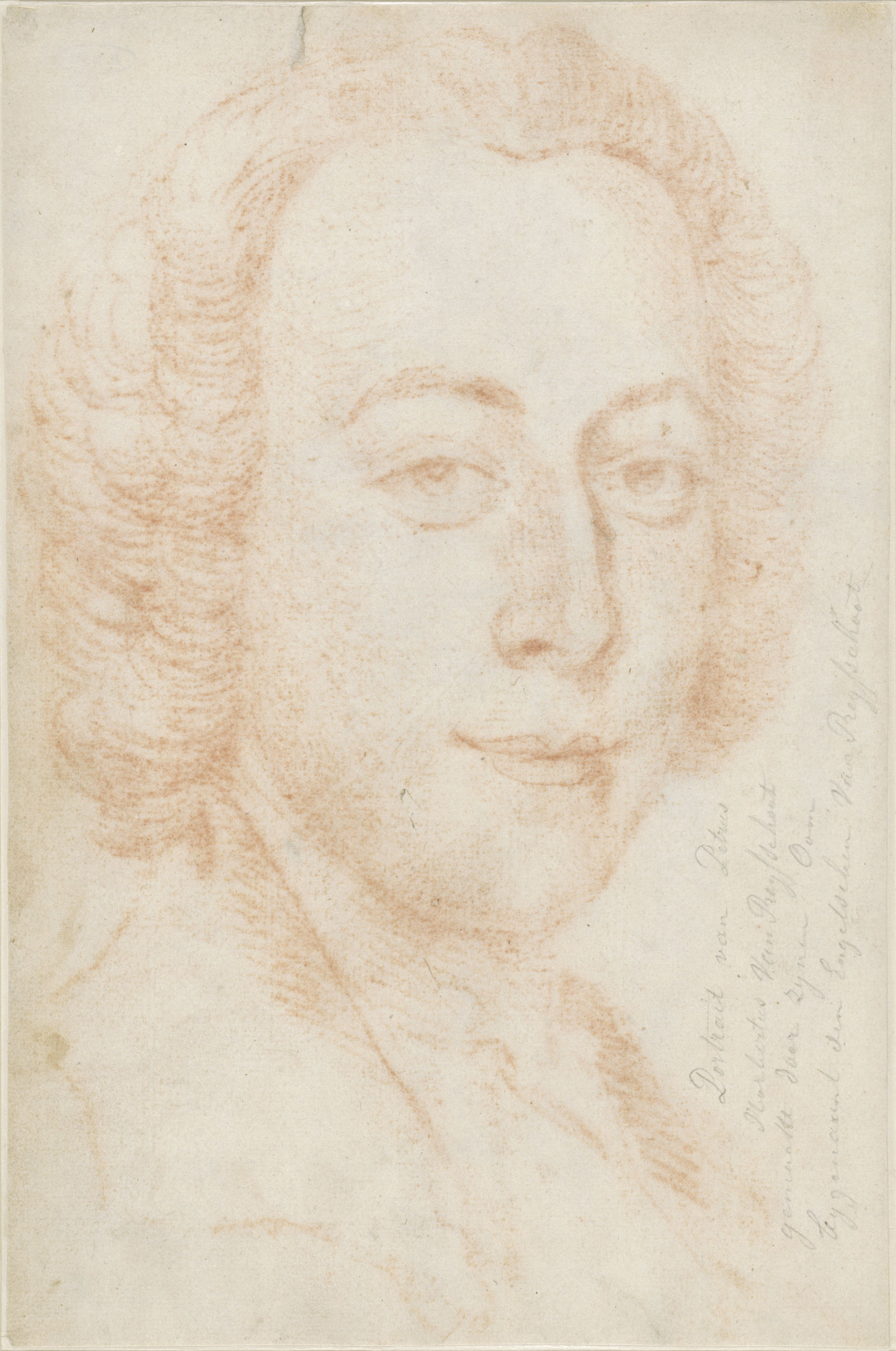
Portrait of Petrus Norbertus van Reysschoot by Petrus Johannes van Reysschoot

Petrus Norbertus van Reysschoot or Pieter Norbert van Reysschoot (4 April 1738, in Ghent – 12 February 1795, in Ghent) was a Flemish painter, draughtsman, educator and art collector.

He spent his career in Ghent. He is known for his projects decorating buildings such as local residences and churches and in particular his grisaille paintings. His subject matter ranged from landscapes, allegories, mythological and religious stories, genre scenes and trompe-l'œil still lifes.

== Family ==
Petrus Norbertus van Reysschoot was born in Ghent as the son of Emanuel Petrus Franciscus and Catherina du Bois. He was member of a family of artists which included a large number of painters in the 18th century.

The first artist of the family was Petrus Johannes van Reysschoot, a painter and printmaker who is known for his genre scenes, hunting scenes, landscapes, portraits and Christian religious subjects. Petrus Norbertus’s father was the brother of Petrus Johannes van Reysschoot and is known for his wide range of decorative work. Petrus Norbertus was the brother of Johannes Emanuel and Anna Maria van Reysschoot, who both became painters.

== Education and career ==
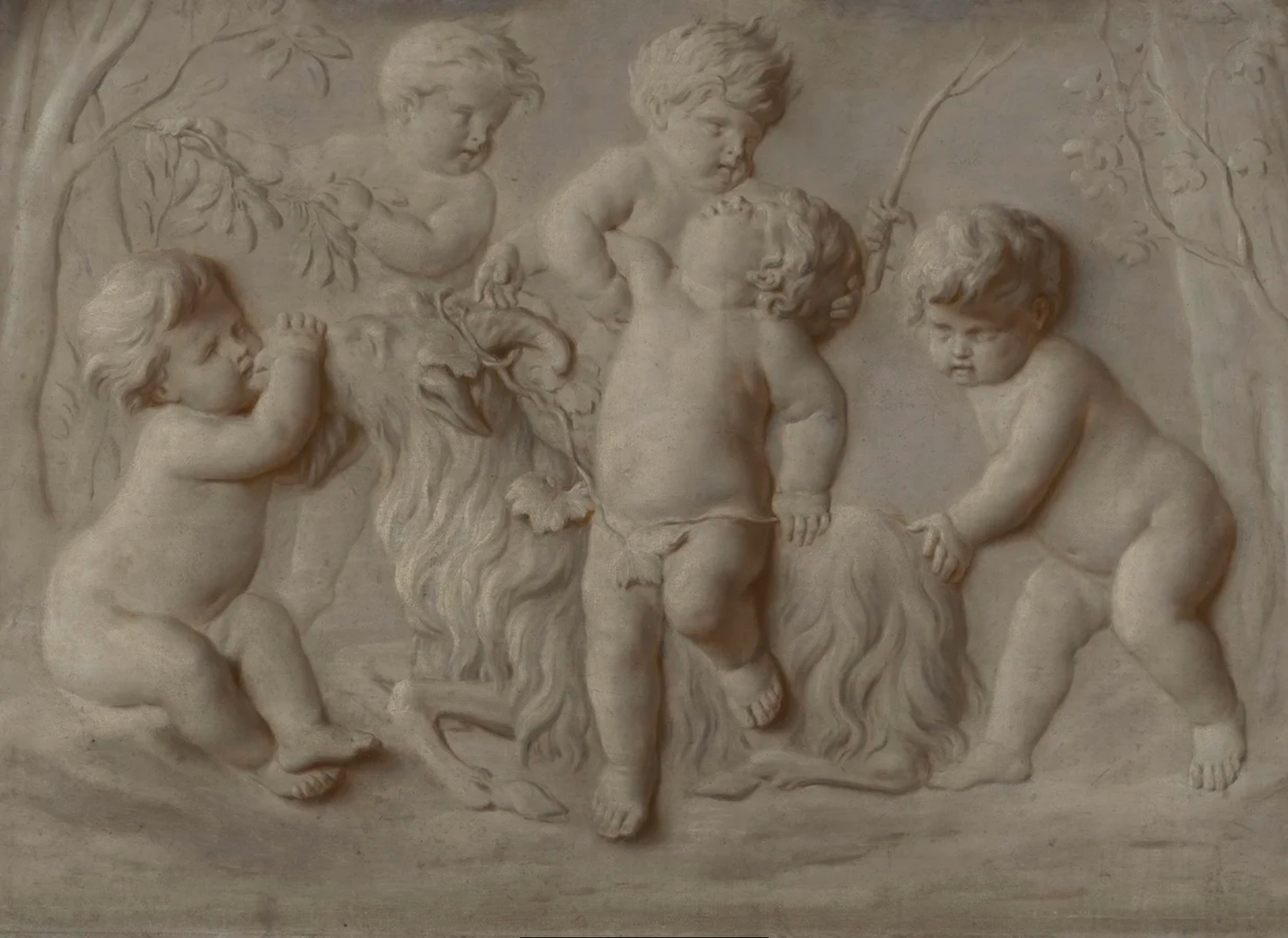
Putti Playing

Petrus Norbertus trained with his father and was admitted as a master in the Guild of Saint Luke of Ghent at the very young age of fifteen. He remained a member of the guild until it was abolished in 1773.

He became a successful artist who enjoyed the patronage of Ghent's well-off bourgeoisie. He also worked for religious institutions. In 1764, he received a commission from the Abbey of Boudelo for which he created some grisailles for the choir.

In 1770, he was appointed to the post of "first professor" of the Royal Academy of Fine Arts of Ghent. He taught dissection, architecture and perspective. In this role, he made a translation into Dutch of the architecture manual of the French architect Jean-François Blondel. It was published in 1792 by P. F. de Goes under the title Grondregelen der bouw-kunde, aengewezen in haere bezonderste deelen, zoo aengaende hunne proportien, vercierselen, als hun gebruyk.

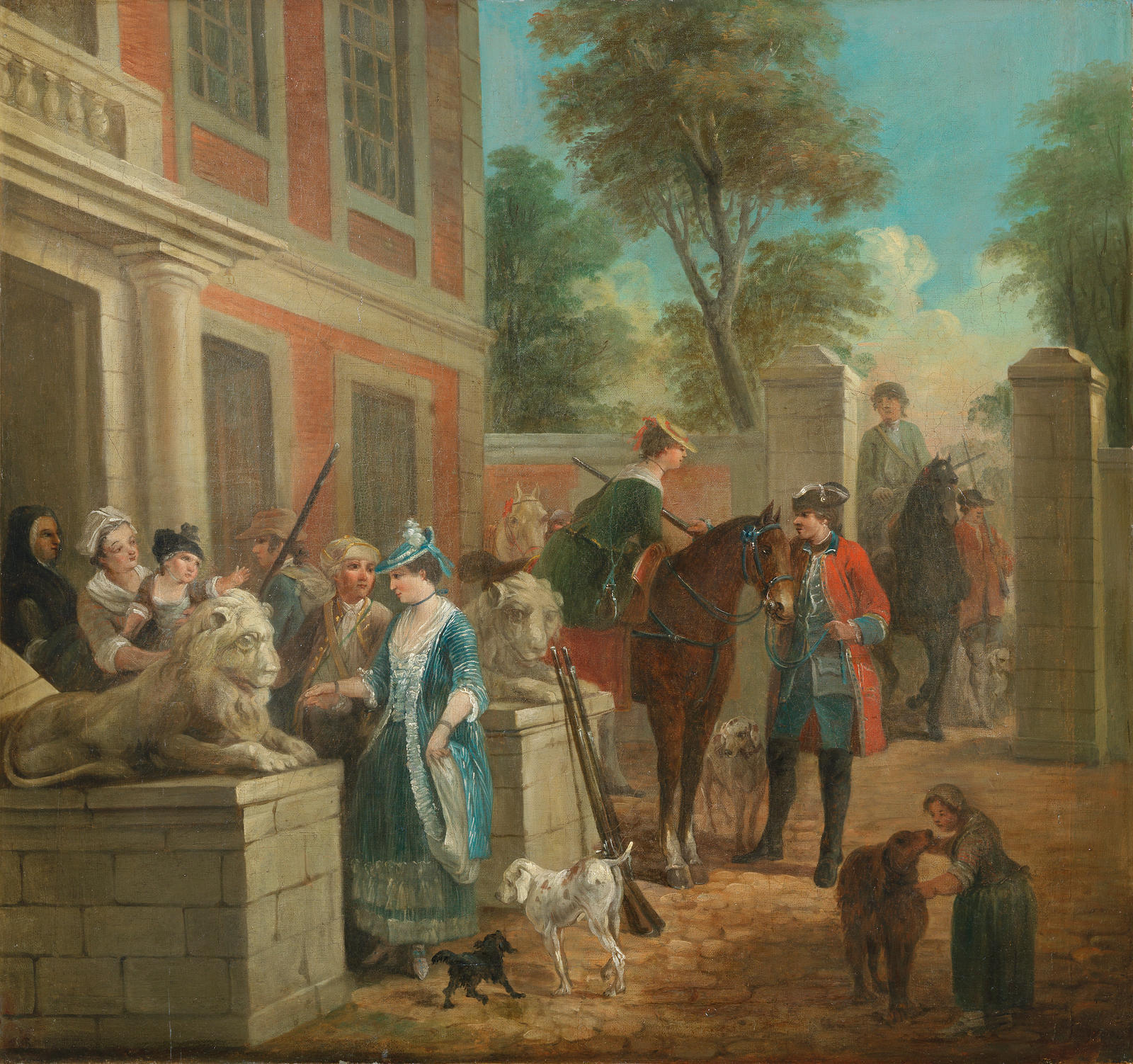
The departure for the hunt

He obtained, in 1773, the commission to illustrate the annual registers of the aldermen of Ghent, a task his recently deceased father had been in charge of before. In 1774, he obtained the commission to paint grisailles for Saint Bavo's Cathedral in Ghent.

For the 1781 Joyous Entry of Joseph II, Holy Roman Emperor into Ghent, the city built a temporary podium on the Vrijdagmarkt, a city square in the center of Ghent. Van Reysschoot was invited to provide the final decorations for the podium. He made a large painting that depicted the 'Loan Tribute of the States', of which two preliminary studies and three designs have survived.

Van Reysschoot participated in various competitions to secure commissions. When moving to the Pakhuis in 1785, the Chamber of Commerce of Ghent organized a competition to decorate its new premises, which was won by van Reysschoot. One of the paintings he created for the chamber is now in the Ghent City Hall. It represents an Allegory of the Ghent trade.

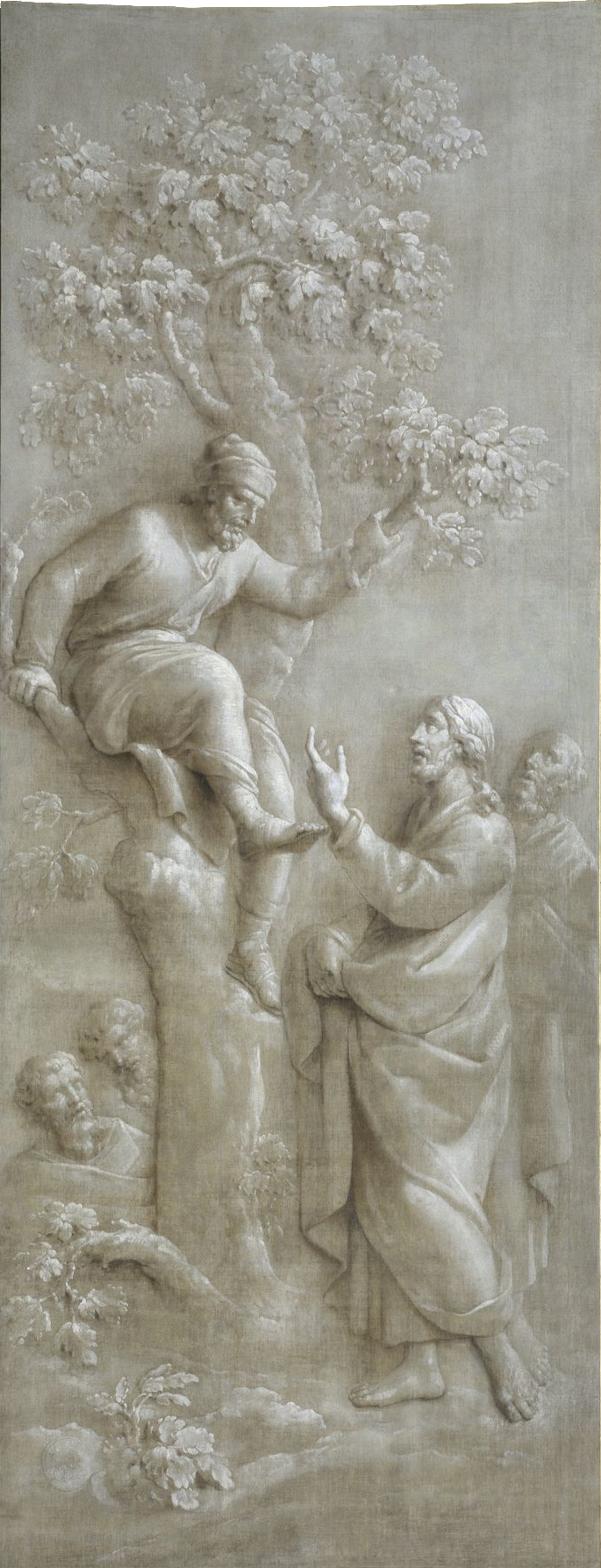
Zacchaeus in the fig tree, Saint Bavo's Cathedral, Ghent

Van Reysschoot received commissions to decorate many private residences. This includes the painting in the dining room of the van Goethem residence. In the Van den Bogaerde residence in the Nederpolder, he was responsible for the decoration of the dining room in which he was assisted by his sister Anna Maria.

At age fifty-two, he married Marie-Anne-Colette Janssens on 14 October 1790. Less than five years later, he died on 12 February 1795.

== Work ==
Van Reysschoot was a prolific painter who painted landscapes, allegories, mythological and religious stories, genre scenes, seascapes, landscapes, portraits and trompe-l'œil still lifes. He was mainly active as a decorative painter working on commissions for individuals and religious institutions. He also painted temporary decorations for theater performances, ceremonies and festivities. He further designed statues and architectural elements of buildings.

He applied himself especially to trompe-l'œil imitations of white marble bas-reliefs executed using the grisaille technique. Grisaille painting was at the time very much in fashion in the Austrian Netherlands and the Dutch Republic. Van Reysschoot gave the genre a new importance in the field of religious subjects.

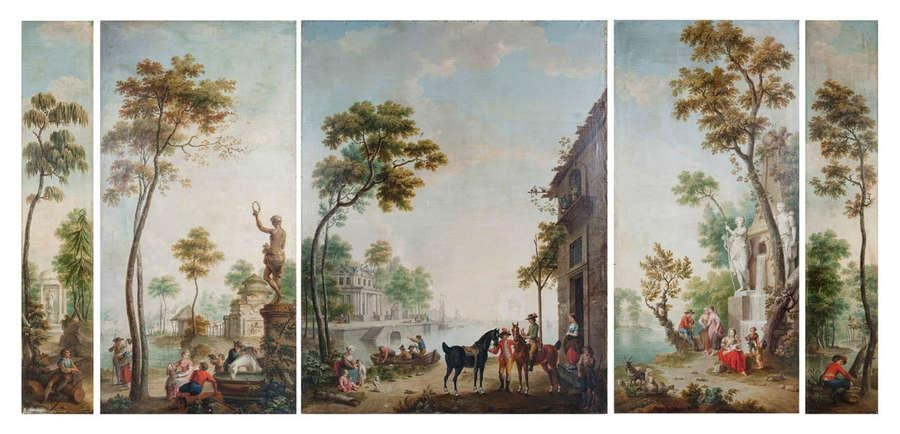
Animated park and harbour views

The principal work that contributed to his reputation is the series of 11 grisailles which decorate the choir of Saint Bavo's Cathedral in Ghent, above the stalls of the choir. Five of these panels represent scenes from the Old Testament, the other six, episodes borrowed from the Gospels. These paintings were placed in the church from 1789 to 1791. The panels joined the panels, Jesus and the Samaritan woman at the well and Noli me tangere, which he had already created for the cathedral in 1774.

Van Reysschoot did not limit himself to monochrome painting alone as he was also a good colorist. He sometimes worked in both genres simultaneously. This is obvious in the decoration of the Hotel d'Hane-Steenhuyse, the residence of the Counts of Hane-Steenhuyse, where he created works in grisaille along colored walls and ceilings. In the ballroom of Hotel d'Hane-Steenhuyse he painted a ceiling fresco representing Mount Olympus supported by the four continents. In the dining room he painted large panels depicting the four seasons, with contemporary members of the Ghent nobility acting as staffage.
