= Johan Decavele =

Belgian historian and archivist

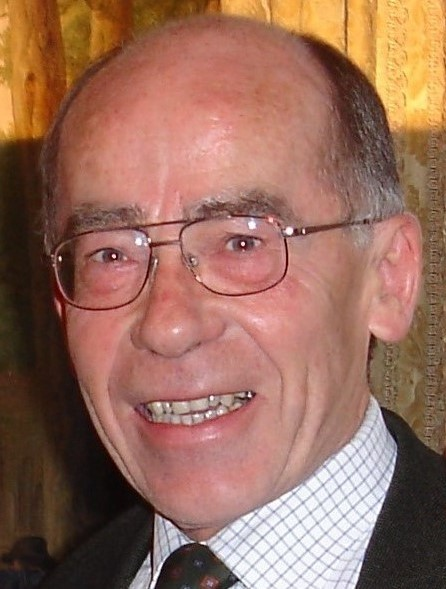
Johan Decavele

Johan Decavele (born Tielt, 1943) is a Belgian historian and archivist who worked as head of the Culture Department of the City of Ghent.

== Life ==
Johan Decavele studied history at the Catholic University of Leuven and continued his academic development at the Leibniz Institute for European History in Mainz. In 1971 he obtained his doctorate at KU Leuven with a thesis on the early Reformation in Flanders, entitled The Dawn of the Reformation in Flanders (De dageraad van de Reformatie in Vlaanderen). His dissertation earned an award from the Royal Flemish Academy of Belgium for Science and the Arts and was published in two volumes as De dageraad van de Reformatie in Vlaanderen (The dawn of the Reformation in Flanders). With its almost 850 pages, the dissertation is generally regarded as the foundational work for the history of the early Protestant Reformation in the Netherlands. This work was regarded by peers and cultural institutions as a standard reference and laid an important foundation for later research into the religious and social transformations in the Low Countries. Decavele extensively examines how political, social, and ecclesiastical structures influenced each other during the rise of reformative ideas and how this dynamic led to significant societal changes. This makes "The Dawn of the Reformation in Flanders". an essential reference for historians seeking to understand the complex interactions between church, state, and society in the sixteenth century. In addition to his direct contribution to knowledge about the early Reformation period, Decavele has also revived the debate about the separation between the South and North in the Low Countries. His findings show that religious dynamics and historical migration movements later played a role in the cultural and political differences that resonate to this day.

Johan Decavele in Ghent City Archive (1980)

During his career at the City of Ghent, which began in 1971 as city archivist and later transitioned into leading roles within cultural service, Decavele played a crucial role in safeguarding the urban and regional history. He was not only responsible for managing and making accessible the historical archive of Ghent, but also organised exhibitions, such as the successful Unity and Division in the Netherlands (Eenheid en Scheiding in de Nederlanden) in 1976. He also participated in gatherings and festivities – such as the pointed festive speech he gave on 11 July at the Town Hall of Ghent – in which he examined the Flemish identity and the uniqueness of the Ghent tradition. His sharp analyses and humorous observations resonated with both the heart of the audience and the academic world. On his 25th anniversary as the city's archivist, a liber amicorum was published in his honour, Qui valet ingenio, with contributions from 37 colleagues and friends. Beyond his archival and historical contributions, Decavele chaired the Gentse Straatnaamgeving Commission, which played a pivotal role in renaming approximately 600 streets after the 1977 merger. Despite his busy ministry, he continued his scholarly work and became an authority on the Reformation. A chapter from his 2004 book was called by reviewer Henk van Nierop "one of the clearest overview articles of early Dutch Protestantism that I know of". He gave numerous lectures in Flanders and the Netherlands.

After a career of nearly 35 years in the cultural organisation of Ghent, Decavele officially retired in 2006. However, his legacy remains visible in the numerous publications and initiatives that keep the history and identity of Ghent alive. At his farewell he was honoured by family, colleagues and friends, the city council and the entire Ghent cultural sector.

During his pension, he continued to publish. In addition to the Reformation, he took back his series of lectures, including six afternoons of courses for the history department of HOVO University Leiden.

== Selected works ==
- "Katharina van Boetzelaer, een merkwaardige figuur van het protestants verzet tijdens het 'wonderjaar'", Annalen (van de) Vereniging voor de Geschiedenis van het Belgisch Protestantisme, reeks V/5 (Brussels, 1969), pp. 151–171.
- "Histoire religieuse", in Un quart de siècle de recherche historique, edited by J.A. Van Houtte (Nationaal Belgisch Comité voor Geschiedkundige Wetenschappen, 1970), pp. 387–403.
- De dageraad van de Reformatie in Vlaanderen (1520-1565), Verhandelingen van de Koninklijke Academie voor Wetenschappen, Letteren en Schone Kunsten van België. Klasse der Letteren, XXXVII, 76, dissertation, 1975. Vol. 1: Text, Vol.2: Indices and appendices.
- Eenheid en Scheiding in de Nederlanden 1555-1585 (with introductions by R.C. Van Caenegem and I. Schöffer), exhibition catalogue, 1976.
- "Reformatie en begin katholieke restauratie 1555-1586", in: Algemene Geschiedenis der Nederlanden, vol. 6 (1979), pp. 166–185, 435-437.
- "Gand. La ville. Les communautés religieuses", in Dictionnaire d'Histoire et de Géographie ecclésiastiques, vol. 19 (1981), col. 1005-1014, 1026-1058.
- "Het herstel van het calvinisme in Vlaanderen 1577-1579", in Brugge in de Geuzentijd (1982), pp. 9–33.
- "Historiografie van het zestiende-eeuws protestantisme in België", Nederlands Archief voor Kerkgeschiedenis, 62 (1982), pp. 1–27.
- Het eind van een rebelse droom. Opstellen over het calvinistisch bewind te Gent (1577-1584) en de terugkeer van de stad onder de gehoorzaamheid van de koning van Spanje (17 september 1584) (with Dirk Coigneau, Herman Vanderlinden, Werner Waterschoot), 1984.
- "Gent, calvinistisch en republikeins strijdcentrum in de Nederlandse Opstand", in Willem van Oranje 1584-1984 (Koninklijke Academiën van België, 1985), pp. 65–86.
- Ghent: In Defence of a Rebellious City. History, Art, Culture, editor (Antwerp, Mercatorfonds, 1989): a standard work on the history of Ghent.
- "Jan Utenhove en de opvoering van het zinnespel te Roborst in 1543", Jaarboek "De Fonteine", 39-40 (1990), pp. 101–116.
- "Vroege reformatorische bedrijvigheid in de grote Nederlandse steden: Claes van der Elst te Brussel, Antwerpen, Amsterdam, Leiden (1524-1528)", Nederlands Archief voor Kerkgeschiedenis, 70:1 (1990), pp. 13–29.
- "Brugse en Gentse Mendicanten op de brandstapel in 1578", in Beleid en bestuur. Liber Amicorum Prof. dr. Michel Baelde (1993), pp. 73–93.
- "Ketters en papisten in het Kortrijkse stadsbestuur (1561-1580)", Handelingen van de Maatschappij voor Geschiedenis en Oudheidkunde te Gent, new series 49 (1995), pp. 223–252.
- "The Torn Netherlands", in The Golden Delta of the Low Countries, edited by H.C.C. de Schepper et al. (Antwerp, 1996), pp. 139–163, 172-179.
- "Cassander, Joris"; "Dathenus, Petrus"; "Ghent"; "Heyden, Gaspar van der"; "Titelmans, Pieter"; "Utenhove, Jan", in The Oxford Encyclopedia of the Reformation, vols. 1-4 (1996).
- De eerste protestanten in de Lage Landen. Geloof en Heldenmoed (Leuven, Davidsfonds, 2004).
- "Kerk en geloofsbeleving in Vlaanderen onder druk aan de vooravond van de Reformatietijd (ca. 1500-1566)", Handelingen van het Genootschap voor Geschiedenis te Brugge, 146 (2009), pp. 3–92. (comments on J. Toussaert, Le sentiment religieux en Flandre à la fin du moyen age).
- De Pacificatie van Gent her(be)dacht, 26e Pacificatielezing in Breda, 2009.
- "De leenbanken in Gent en andere Vlaamse steden in de zestiende eeuw: een heikele kwestie", in Geschiedenis: zijn werk, zijn leven. Huldeboek René De Herdt, edited by Ann Van Nieuwenhuyse et al. (Ghent, MIAT, 2010), pp. 91–111.
- Het geheugen van Nederland in Gent (with Herman Balthazar), 2011.
- "Het waarheidsgehalte in de preken van Broeder Cornelis van Dordrecht in Brugge (1566-1569)", Handelingen van het Genootschap voor Geschiedenis te Brugge, 148 (2011), pp. 1–42; 149 (2012), pp. 363–393.
- "La place de Guy de Brès dans la Réforme de son époque", in The Belgic Confession at 450, special issue of Analecta Bruxellensia, 15 (2012), pp. 30–40.
- "Protestantse invloeden in Brugge in het midden van de 16de eeuw. Een internationaal netwerk", Tijdschrift voor Nederlandse Kerkgeschiedenis, 16 (2013), pp. 6–23.
- "Op de calvinistische toer. Het Land van Waas tijdens de overheersing van het revolutionaire Gent, 1578-1583", Handelingen der Maatschappij voor Geschiedenis en Oudheidkunde te Gent, new series 68 (2014), pp. 209–249.
- "Protestanten in het Land van Waas in de zestiende eeuw", Koninklijke Oudheidkundige Kring van het Land van Waas: Annalen, vol. 119 (2016), pp. 27–92.
- Jozef Scheerder, Het wonderjaar te Gent, 1566-1567, edited by Johan Decavele and Gustaaf Janssens (Ghent, Academia Press, 2016).
- Zevenhonderdvijftig jaar begijnenbeweging. Onze-Lieve-Vrouw ter Hoyen in Gent (2016).
- Selected works
- References
- External links (in Dutch): see Dutch version of the Wikipedia
