= David 't Kindt =

David 't Kindt (12 January 1699 – 15 July 1770) was a Flemish architect who practised in Ghent and worked in the Rococo style. He is recognised as "the central figure of Ghent Rococo".

== Biography ==
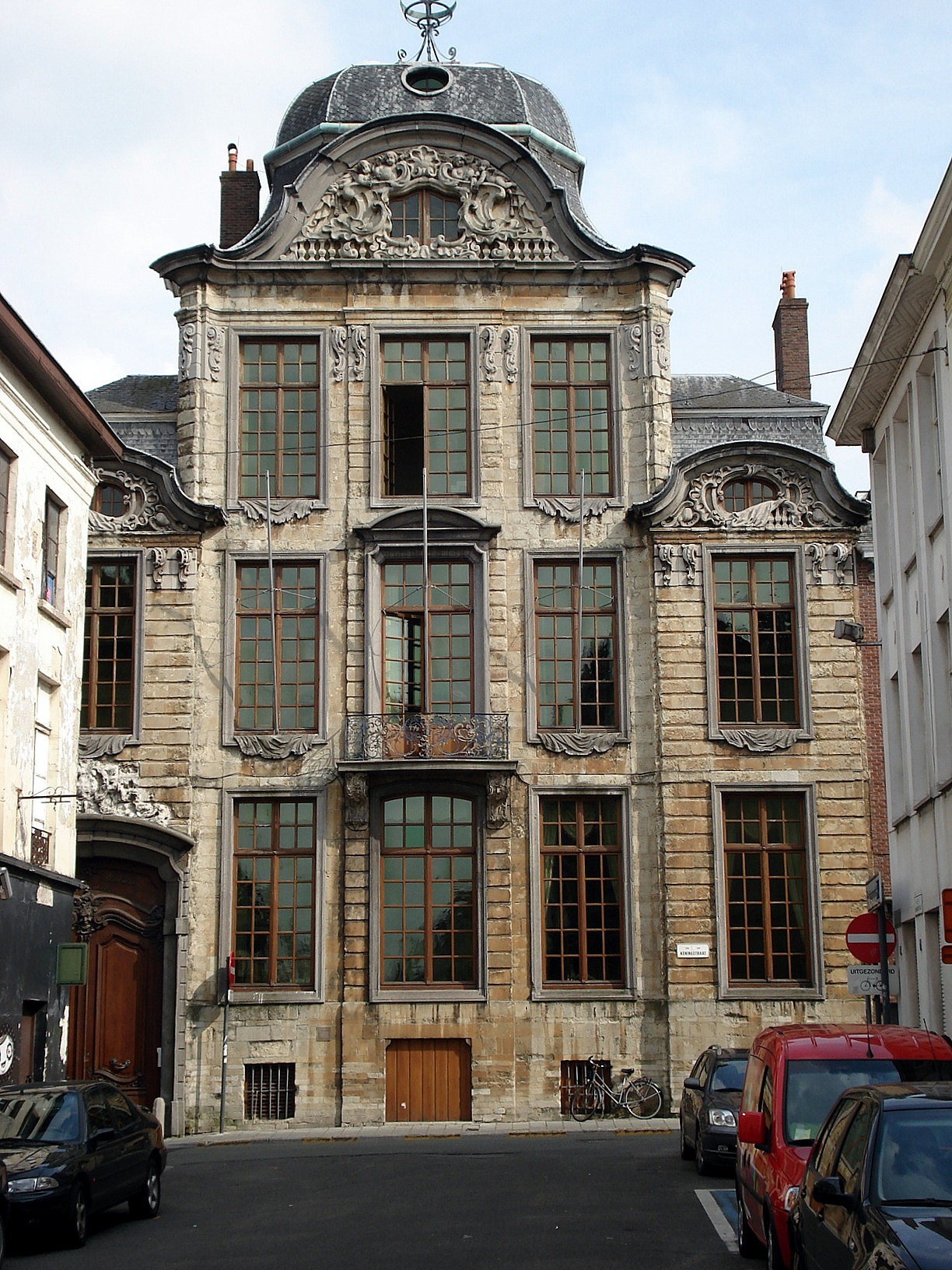
The Royal Academy of Dutch Language and Literature, Ghent

He was born in 1699 in Ghent (then in the Austrian Netherlands), where he joined the Carpenters' Guild in 1726, and continued to practise, being appointed municipal director of works for the city in 1755. At the end of his life, he served as the first director of the Académie Royale de Peinture, Dessin, Sculpture et Architecture.

His son Louis 't Kindt (1734 – c.1800) was also an architect. David 't Kindt died on 15 July 1770 in Ghent.

== Buildings ==
His work is mainly in the Rococo style, which he and Bernard de Wilde pioneered in Ghent. An example is the theatre on Vrijdagmarkt of 1744, which features a curved front; Marie Fredericq-Lilar describes its style in t' Kindt's Grove Art Online entry: "sinuous line prevails; every curve is answered by a counter-curve", with "bold" and "soft" elements in balance.

His works include (in Ghent unless otherwise noted):

- Hoofwacht or city guardhouse, Kouter (executing a design by de Wilde; 1738); this is recognised by Fredericq-Lilar as the earliest example of Ghent Rococo
- Mammelokker (1741), a small prison built on to the existing Gothic Cloth Hall
- Theatre on Vrijdagmarkt (1744)
- Hotel Oombergen (1746), originally built as a family house, now seat of the Royal Academy of Dutch Language and Literature (Koninklijke Academie voor Nederlandse Taal en Letterkunde)
- Hôtel Damman (1745)
- Hôtel van Goethem (1745)
- Hôtel Snoeck (1749)
- Hôtel Falligan (1755)
- Town Hall, Lokeren
- Hotel de Coninck
