= Vrijdagmarkt =

Square in Ghent, Belgium

Coordinates: 51°3′26″N 3°43′33″E

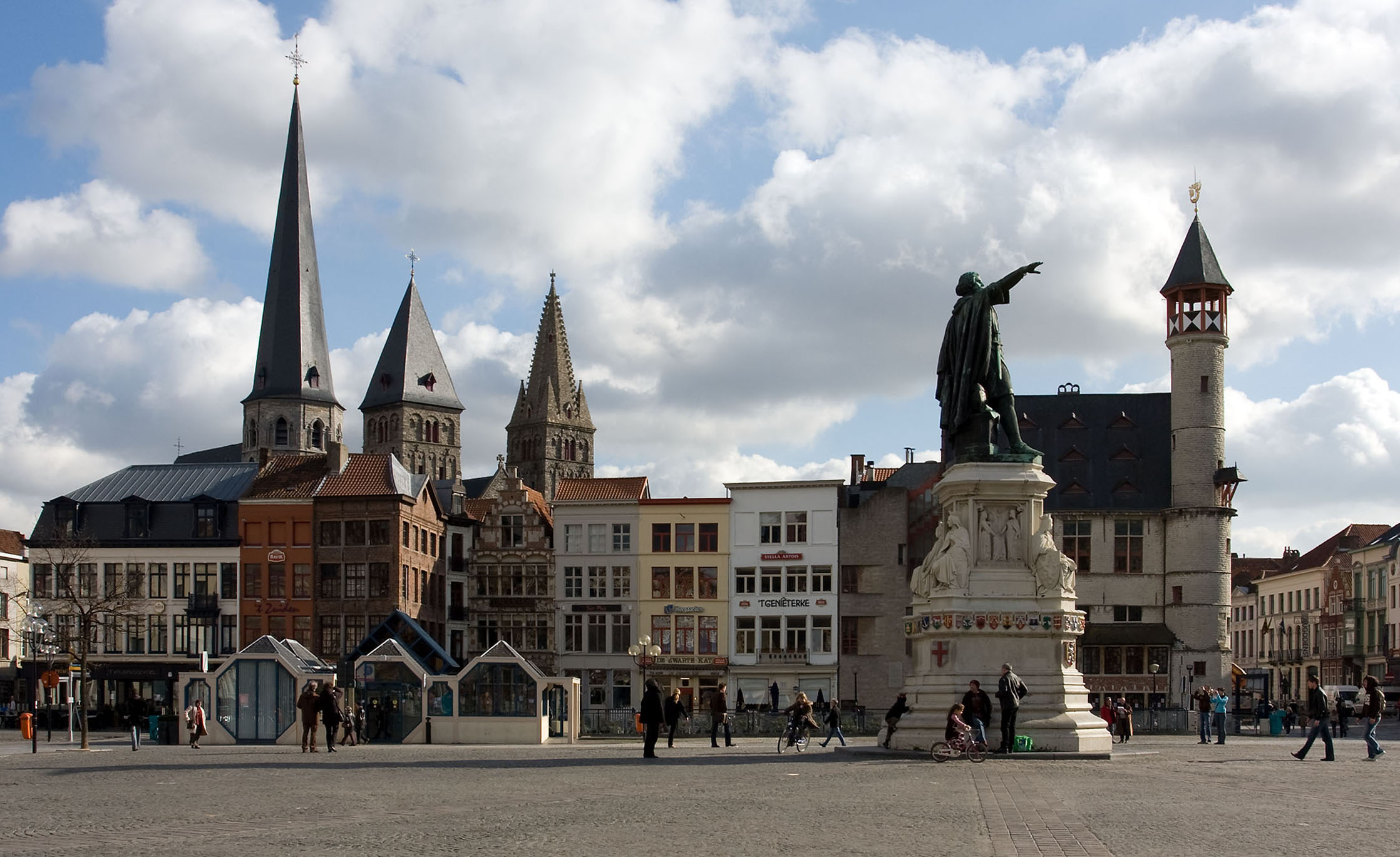
Statue of Jacob van Artevelde in the middle of the Vrijdagmarkt

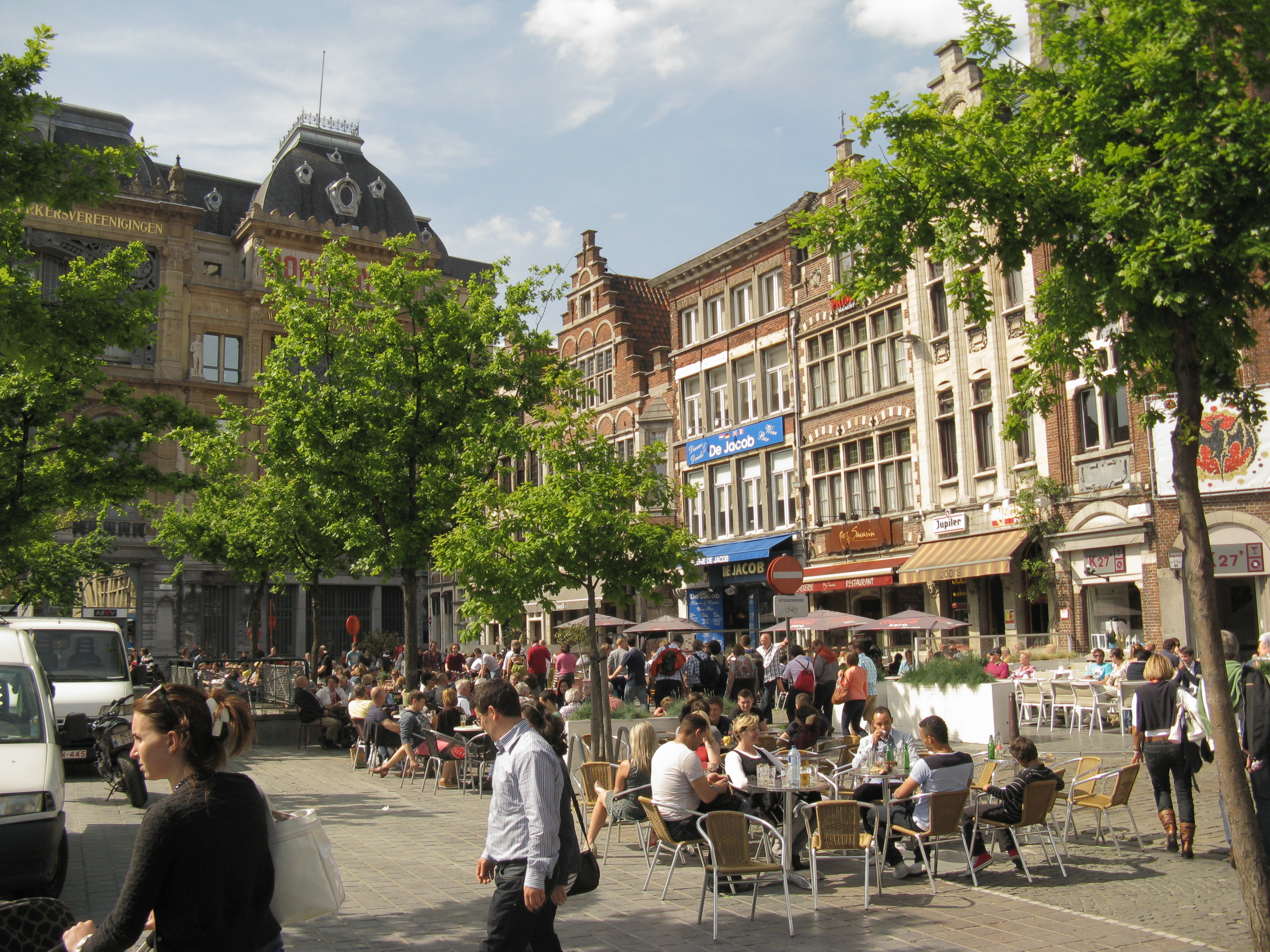
Terraces on the square during Summer

The Vrijdagmarkt (Dutch pronunciation: [ˈvrɛidɑxmɑr(ə)kt]; "Friday Market") is a city square in the historic centre of Ghent, East Flanders, Belgium. It is named after the weekly tradition to stage a market every Friday morning. As one of the oldest squares in Ghent, it played an important role in the city's history.

== History ==
The centerpiece of the plaza is the statue of Jacob van Artevelde, Ghent's wise man who sided with England during the Hundred Years' War and was murdered on the site in 1345. Van Artevelde had, on 26 January 1340, proclaimed in the Vrijdagmarkt Edward III of England as king of France. This was the first formal declaration of Edward's claim to the French crown at the beginning of the Hundred Years' War.

== Location ==
With its dimensions of roughly 100 by 100 metres, it is one of the largest public squares in Ghent. Every Friday morning, the square is filled with market stalls; a tradition dating back to 1199.

The square is surrounded with guildhalls, which currently house bars, restaurants and terraces. In the northerly corner, there are two monumental Art Nouveau buildings of the socialist movement, built at the turn of the 20th century, which currently house the socialist health insurance federation and the General Labour Federation of Belgium (ABVV/FGTB).

Underneath the square there is an underground multi-storey car park with a maximum capacity of 648 vehicles.

== Panoramic view ==
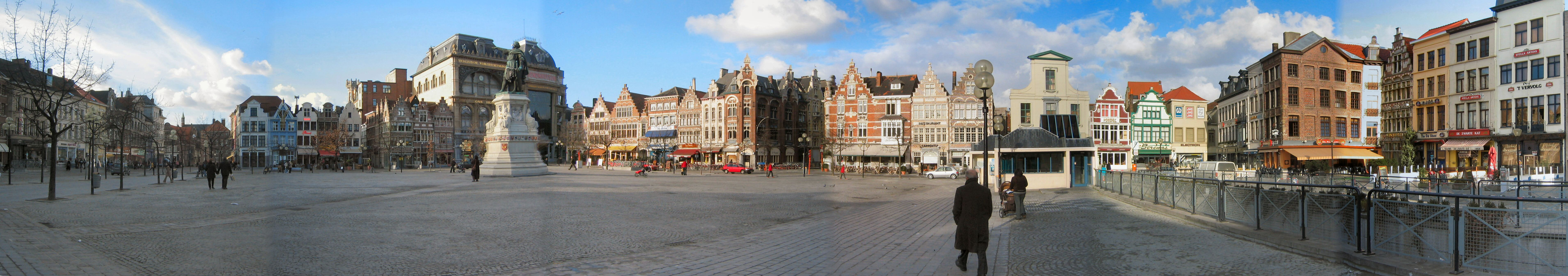
Panoramic view of the Vrijdagmarkt in 2006
