= Ghent City Museum =

Museum in the Belgian city of Ghent

- STAM
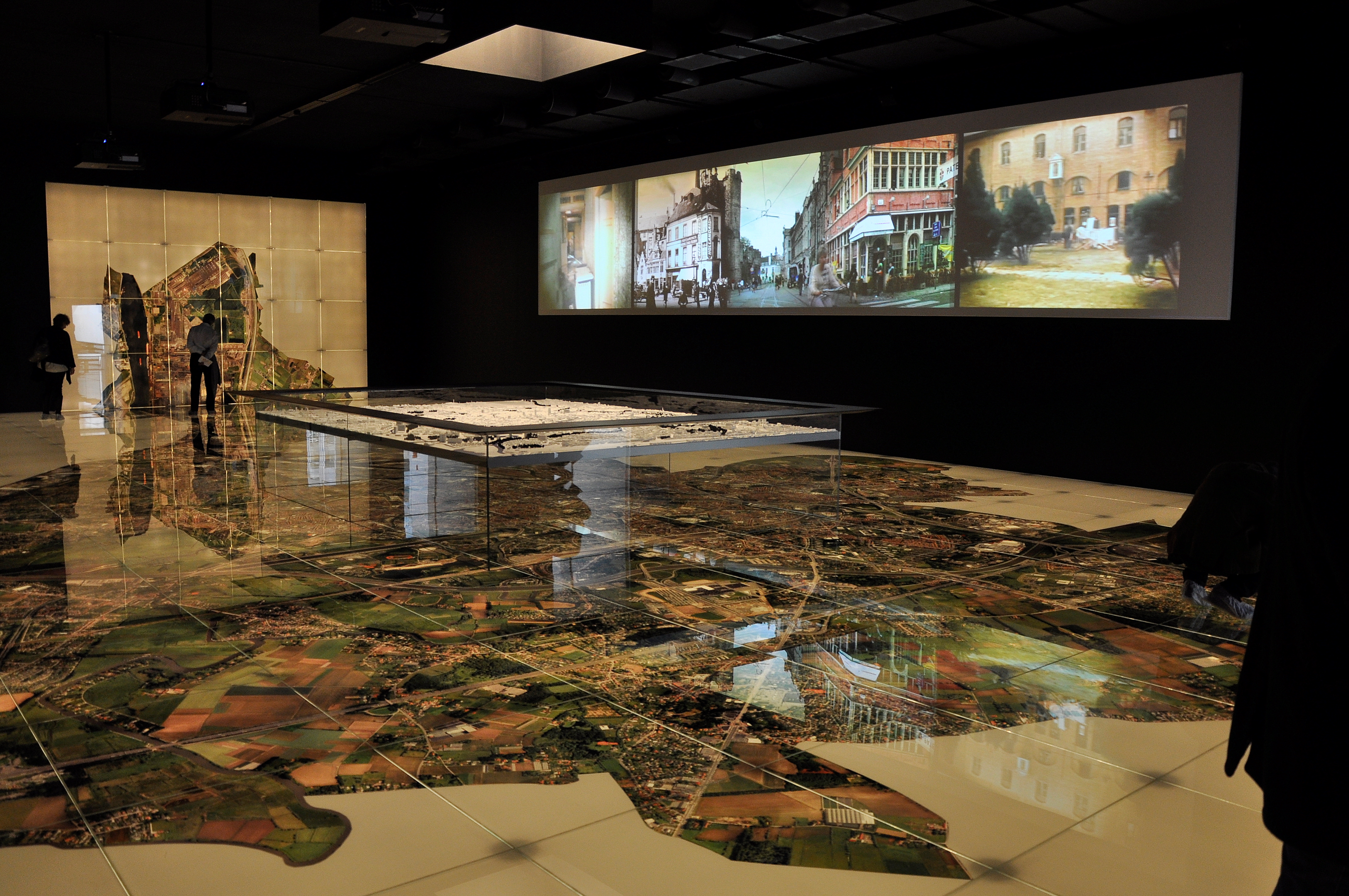
- Multimedial introduction to the history of the city of Ghent
- Established: 2010
- Location: Ghent, Belgium
- Coordinates: 51.043486°N 3.716970°E
- Type: Cultural history
- Website: http://www.stamgent.be

The Ghent City Museum (in Dutch "Stadsmuseum Gent", "STAM" in short) is a museum in the Belgian city of Ghent. The museum exposes the city history and opened its doors on 9 October 2010. With respect to the collection that is shown, the history of this museum goes back to 1833, the year in which the Oudheidkundig Museum van de Bijloke in Ghent was founded. In 1928 the museum was situated in the Bijloke abbey - this led to the name Bijlokemuseum.

With the Bijloke collection as base and the Bijloke abbey and Bijloke monastery as buildings, the STAM functions as a modern-day heritage forum. Parts from other collections were added to the Bijloke collection. In connection to the historical buildings, a new entrance building was constructed, designed by Ghent's city architect Koen Van Nieuwenhuyse.

The main circuit of the Ghent City Museum serves as a museal and multimedial introduction to a visit to the city of Ghent. The past of the town is illustrated, but also today's life and the future are discussed. The temporary STAM collections describe the phenomenon of "urbanity" by means of contemporary issues. STAM refers the visitor to the city itself and to Ghent's cultural heritage. Chronologically structured rooms invite the visitors to explore various thematics. There is also a section dedicated to the Ghent Altarpiece.

The Ghent City Museum was the winner of the 2012 Flemish Museum Prize.

== Eyecatchers ==
Eyecatching parts of the museum are the sky picture of Ghent (300 m^{2} large) on which the visitors can walk around, and software with which Ghent can be viewed in detail and over the course of four centuries. In the Bijloke abbey that can be accessed through a passerelle in glass, the history of the city is told by means of three hundred objects. Views on Ghent is another multimedial application: a screen shows a city view from the year 1534, floor-plans from 1614 and 1912 and a sky picture from the present. There is also a room for temporary exhibitions.

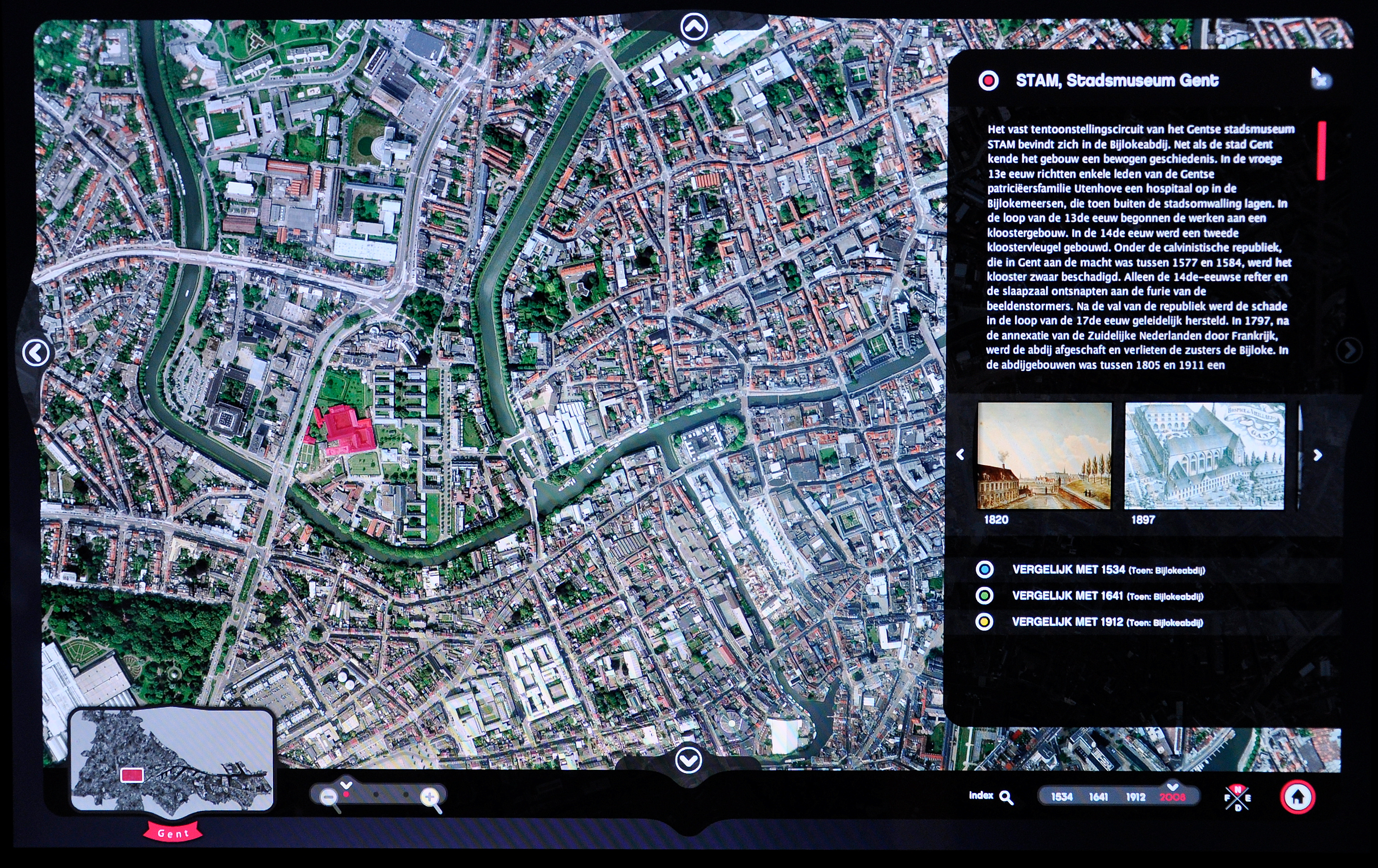
Interactive floor-plan

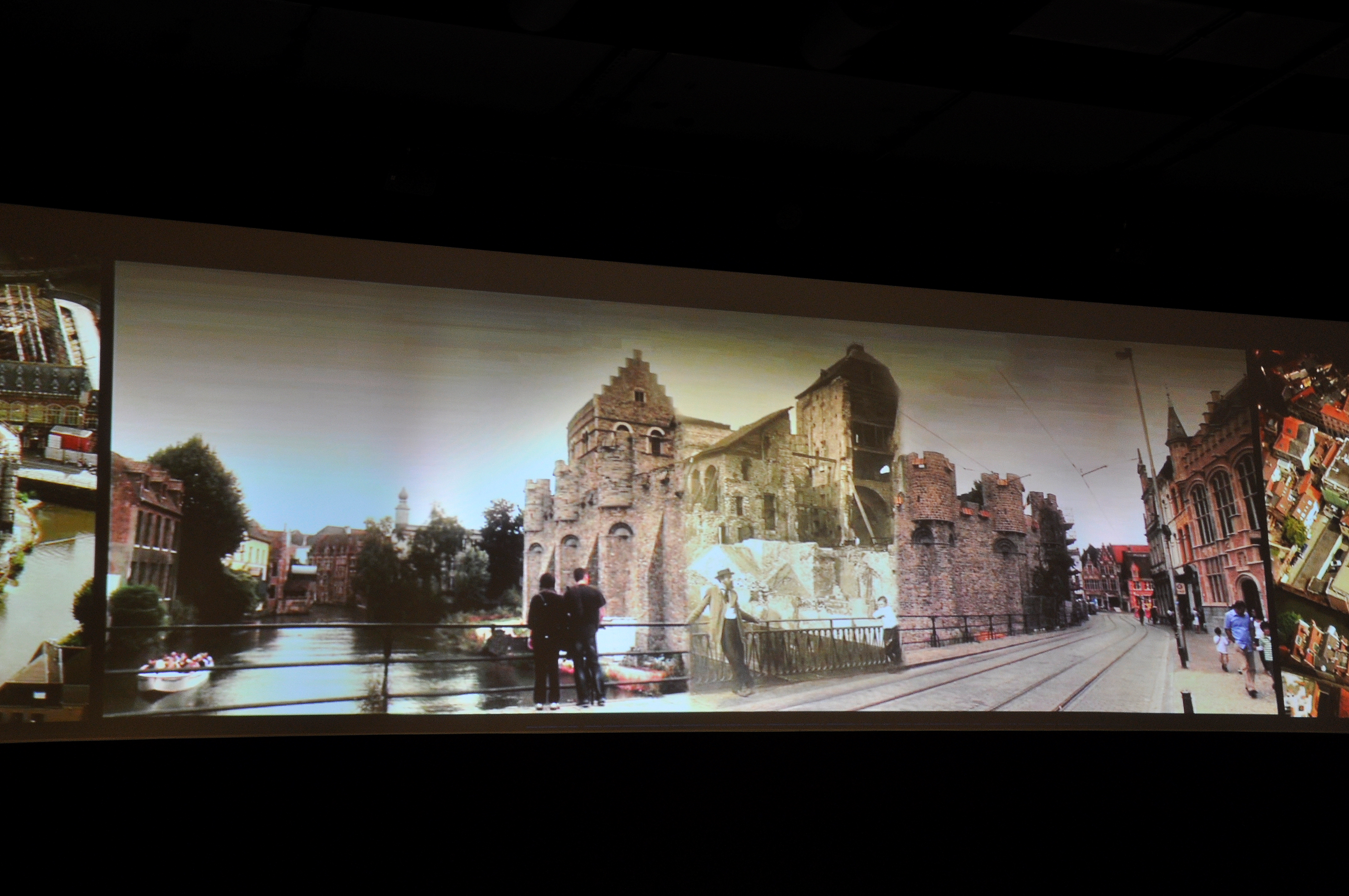
Projection of Gravensteen images

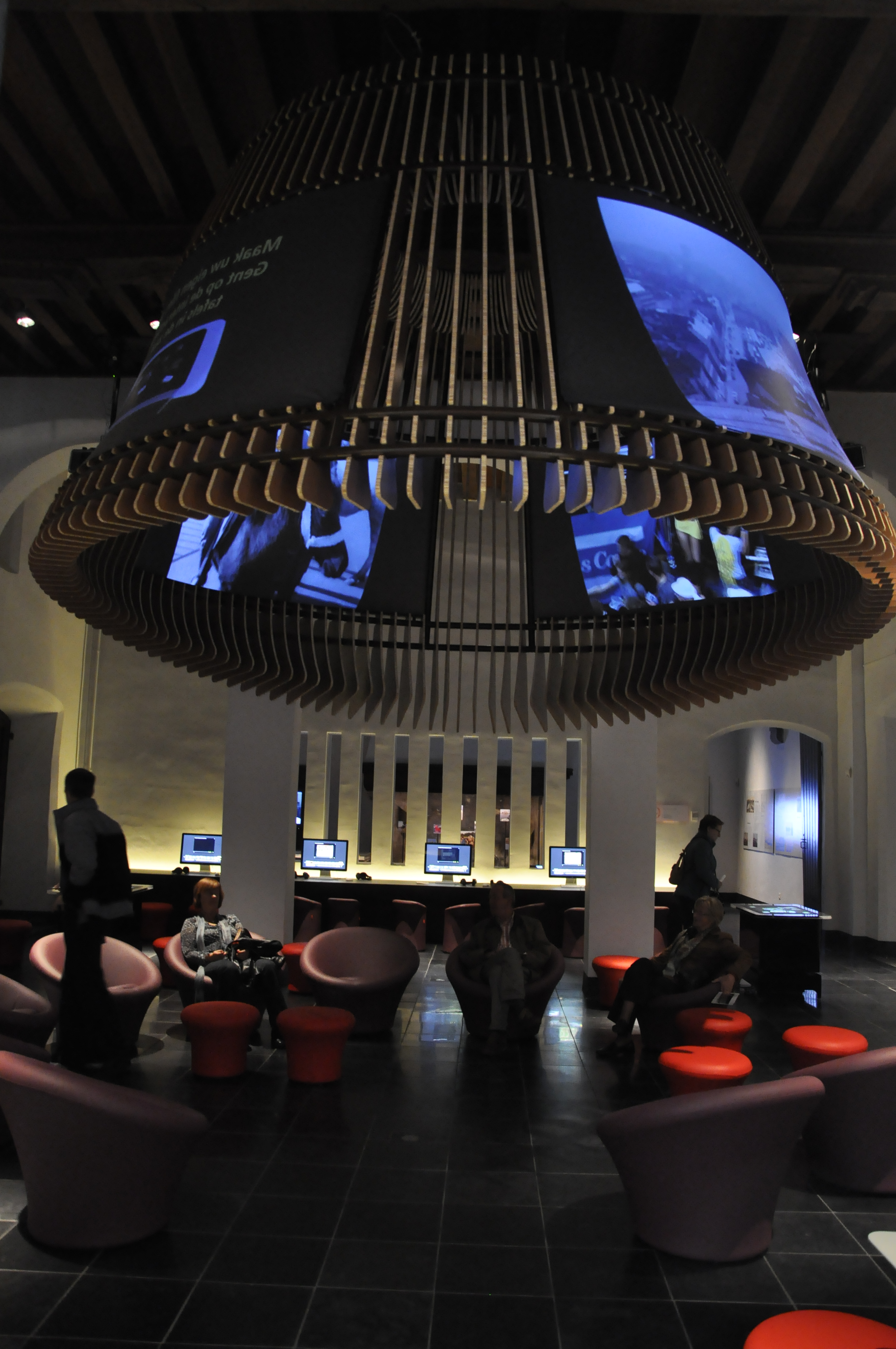
One of the rooms

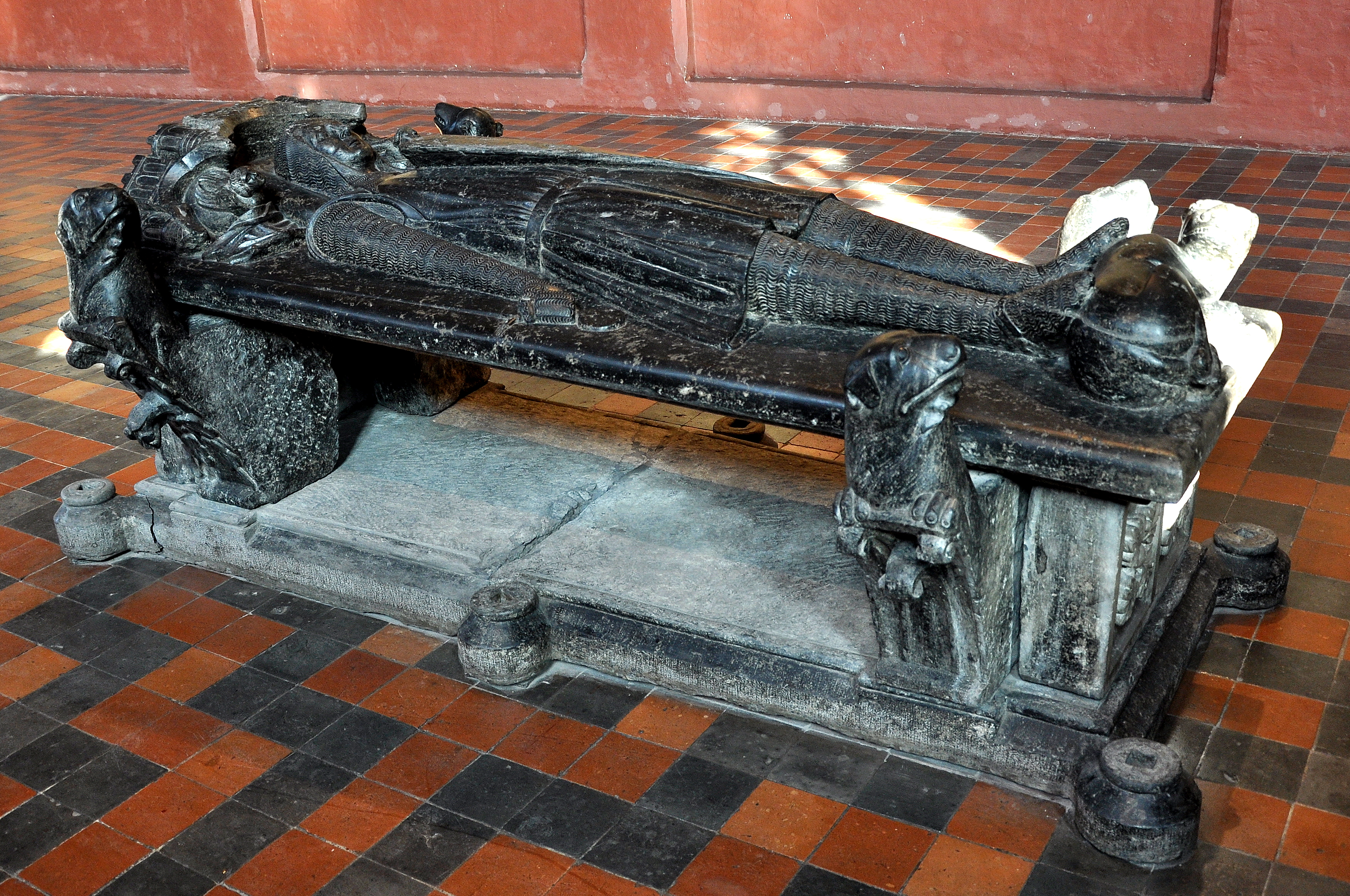
Tomb of Hugo II, viscount of Ghent from 1227 until 1232, in the abbey dining room

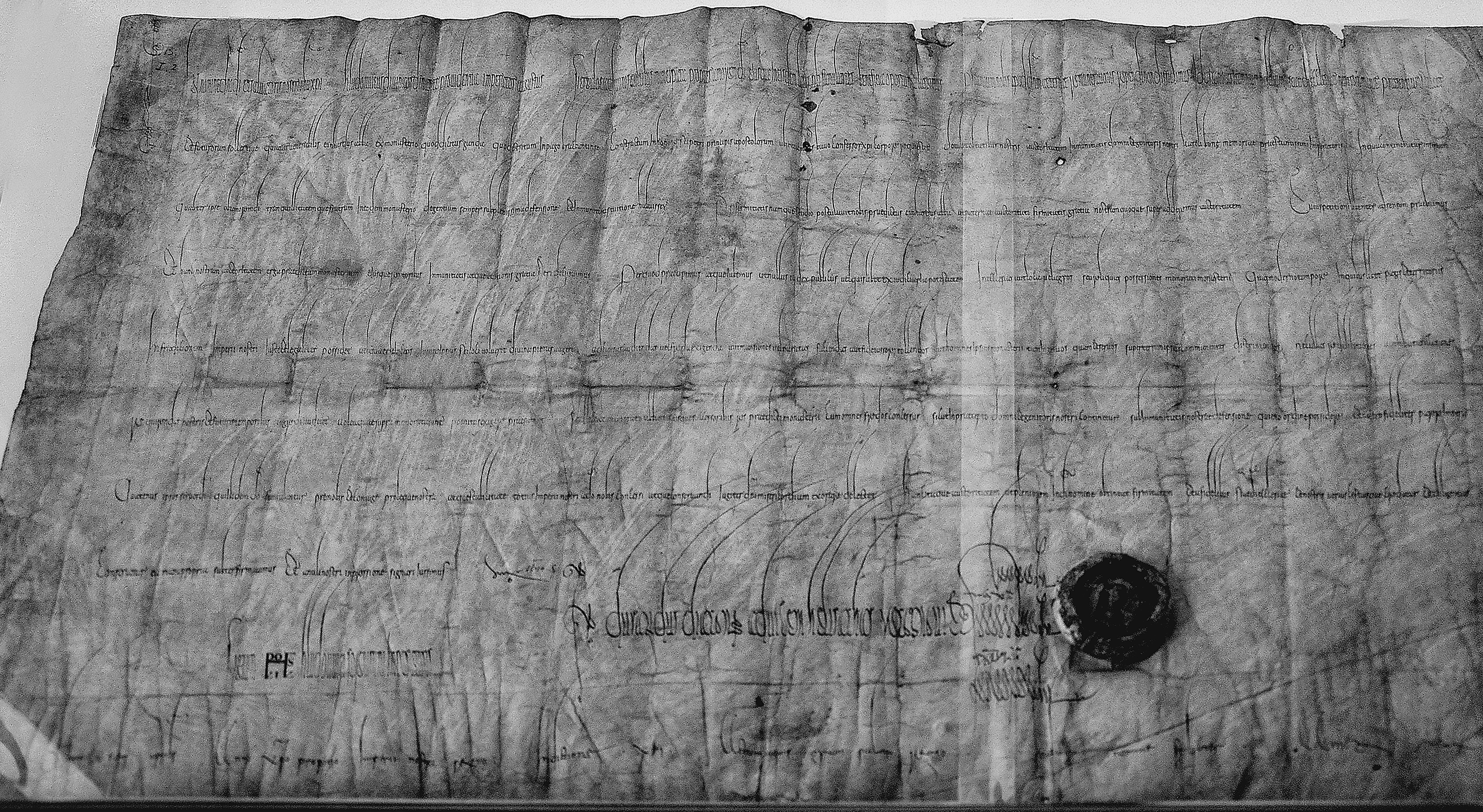
Charter of Louis the Pious, given to the Sint-Baafs abbey, in which Louis confirms her immunity

== Issue of Nazi-looted art ==
In 2022, an investigative article in De Standaard pointed out that Belgian museums still held art that had been looted during the Nazi occupation from Jews in Belgium. A painting by Gaspar de Crayer which had been seized from the collector Samuel Hartveld, was purchased by the Bijloke museum. The Bijloke Museum later transferred the painting to the Museum of Fine Arts, Ghent, where it remains today.
