= Harrogate International Festivals =

Arts festival and registered charity

Harrogate International Festivals (HIF) is a registered charity and one of the UK's longest running arts festivals, having been established in 1966. It is based in Harrogate, North Yorkshire.

Festivals include the Harrogate Music Festival, Theakston Old Peculier Crime Writing Festival, Harrogate International Spring Series, Raworths Harrogate Literature Festival and a programme of outreach which includes the Spiegeltent and Children's Festival programmes. HIF also runs a programme of community outreach including literacy, music and arts programmes for young people and communities with least access to the arts due to rural isolation, geographical location or social exclusion.

His Majesty King Charles III is the Festival's patron, and Peter Blackburn CBE is its honorary president.

Dame Fanny Waterman, DBE was honorary president from 2009 until her death in 2020, the position having previously been held by Clive Leach CBE. A past vice-president was Harrogate historian Malcolm Neesam.

The current Chair of the Trustees is Fiona Movley.

In 2017, HIF won the Northern Soul Arts Festival of the Year Award.

== History ==
The Harrogate International Festival was set up in response to local demand to re-establish the quality of event that people had been used to between the wars in the town's spa heyday. In 1966, with the help of composer Benjamin Britten and singer Peter Pears of Aldeburgh Festival fame, and financial support from Harrogate Borough Council and the Arts Council of England, Clive Wilson launched the Festival and became its first director. In artistic terms the Festival has changed radically from its origins in the late sixties.

The Festival dates (originally in mid-August) were chosen as they had to fit into the town's conference and exhibition calendar. In its early days the Festival featured music, literature, drama, visual arts and science. However, over the following decades music came to the fore, making up around 90% of the programme.

In 1984 following a national Arts Council strategy review entitled "The Glory of the Garden", funding was withdrawn from all festivals north of Cheltenham. Up to that point Harrogate had received a guarantee against loss of £38,000, the biggest Arts Council grant of any festival in England. The loss of the grant demanded a more populist approach to programming in order to build ticket revenue and to enable the major scaling up of corporate sponsorship.

In 1991 it was recognised that a broadening of the artistic programme was needed to extend the audience reach – geographically and the under 55s – as well as by genre and to increase sponsorship, trust funding and box office revenue, in order for the Festival to grow. An incremental expansion of the performing arts programming commenced initially with jazz, contemporary dance and classical ballet, World Music and literature.

In an average 12-month period the Festivals stage over 300 distinct events and attract over 90,000 people to its activities. Alongside box office sales they rely on sponsorship, grants and charitable giving.

== Festivals ==
=== Harrogate Music Festival ===
International music festival held across various venues during the month of July.

=== Harrogate Crime Writing Festival ===
Known as the Theakston Old Peculier Crime Writing Festival (TOPCWF), and held over four days in July, the festival was launched in 2003. TOPCWF is sponsored by T & R Theakston and is held at The Old Swan Hotel in Harrogate.

The winner of the Theakstons Old Peculier Crime Novel of the Year Award is announced on the opening night.

In 2013 The Guardian described TOPCWF as one of the best crime-writing festivals around the world and in 2016 TOPCWF was named by Elle Magazine as one of the six best literary festivals.

=== Harrogate Literature Festival ===
Launched in 2012 and known as the Raworths Harrogate Literature Festival, the festival is held in October. Selected by Harper's Bazaar as 'one of the UK's best literary festivals the event celebrates great writing by bringing best-selling authors, politicians, comedians and stars of the stage to share their stories.

Due to the COVID-19 pandemic the 2020 festival was held online. Speakers included Bernard Cornwell, Lee Child, Matt Haig, Rory Bremner and Ken Follett.

Speakers at the 2019 festival included David Cameron, Simon Weston, Sir Tim Waterstone and Louise Minchin.

=== Harrogate International Sunday Series ===
A series of international chamber concerts are held at the Old Swan, Harrogate between January and April each year. The Sunday Series was launched in 1993.

=== Salon North ===
Known as Berwins Salon North, the events consist of three speakers who explore ideas from art, science and psychology.

=== Spiegeltent & Children's Festival ===
A week-long festival of club classics, soul and jazz is housed in a Spiegeltent on Crescent Gardens in Harrogate. The venue is transformed through the day to house a Children's Festival featuring arts, music, science and literature that traditionally takes place during May and June.

== Outdoor Work ==
HIF claims to have a reputation for bringing major outdoor installations to Harrogate. Large scale projects include, Cie Carabosse Fire Garden – 2016, Pentalum Luminarium by Architects of Air – 2018, Museum of the Moon by Luke Jerram – 2019 and In Memorium by Luke Jerram in 2021.

In October 2021, a temporary sound and light art installation, celebrating Harrogate's 450 year spa heritage, was installed next to the Royal Pump Room Museum in the town. Entitled '1571 The Water That Made Us', the installation was a collaboration between sound and light artists, Dan Fox, and James Bawn and HIF.
