= UCL East =

Campus of University College London

- Marshgate building, UCL East
- Type: Satellite campus
- Established: 2023
- Parent institution: University College London
- Pro-Provost: Paola Lettieri
- Location: Stratford, London; 51.538°N 0.012°W
- Website: www.ucl.ac.uk/ucl-east
- Location within Greater London

One Pool Street

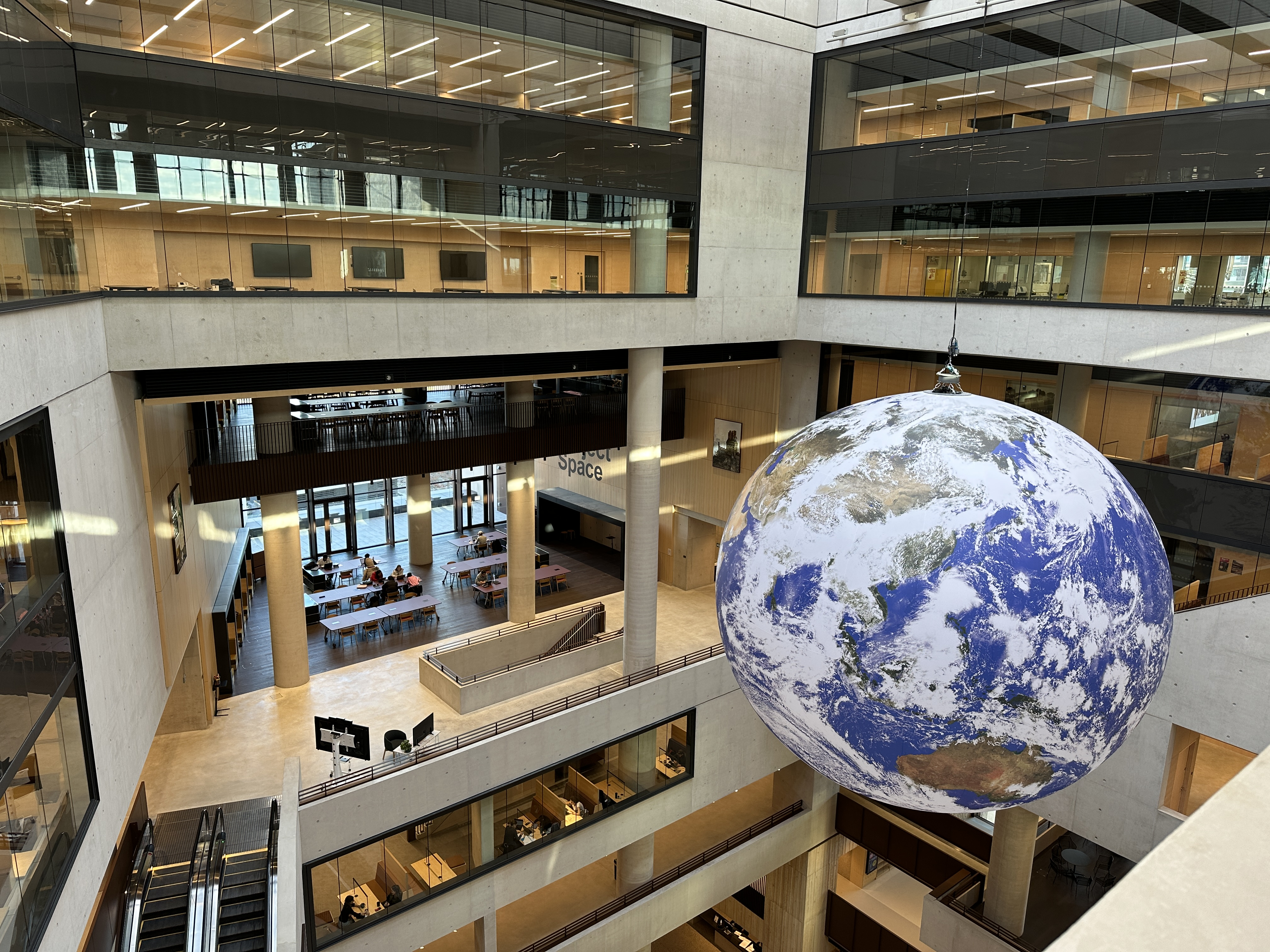
Interior of Marshgate building (with Luke Jerram's Gaia)

UCL East is a campus of University College London located at the Queen Elizabeth Olympic Park in Stratford, London. Operations at the campus began with the opening of One Pool Street in 2022 and the campus was formally opened with the opening of the Marshgate building in 2023. The 2017 masterplan for the campus calls for the construction of another four buildings in the 2030s.

== History ==
In 2011, UCL announced plans for a £500 million investment in its main Bloomsbury campus over 10 years, as well as the establishment of a new 23-acre (9.3 ha) campus (UCL East) next to the Olympic Park in Stratford in the East End of London. The plans were revised in 2014 to 11 acres (4.5 ha) with up to 125,000 m^{2} (1,350,000 ft^{2}) of space on Queen Elizabeth Olympic Park. UCL East was conceived as part of plans to transform the Olympic Park into a cultural and innovation hub, where UCL would open its first school of design, a centre of experimental engineering and a museum of the future, along with a living space for students.

Master planners for the new campus were appointed in spring 2015, and it was estimated that the first university building would be completed for academic year 2019/20.

Alongside the announcement of the development of UCL East, the UCL Urban Laboratory carried out a series of case studies of university-led urban regeneration, with results published in September 2015. The sites studied to inform the UCL East development included Queen's Campus, Durham University in Stockton on Tees, the University of Cambridge's North West Cambridge development, Newcastle University's Science Central innovation district, the University of Pennsylvania, New York University and Columbia University in the US, and the Somerleyton Road regeneration scheme in south London, a partnership between Lambeth Council, Brixton Green mutual benefit society and Ovalhouse Theatre.

It was revealed in June 2016 that the UCL East expansion could see the university grow to 60,000 students. The proposed rate of growth was reported to be causing concern, with calls for it to be slowed down to ensure the university could meet financial stability targets.

Outline planning permission for UCL East was submitted in May 2017 by the London Legacy Development Corporation and UCL, and granted in March 2018. Construction of the first phase of buildings was then expected to begin in 2019, with the first building (Pool Street West) expected to be completed for the start of the 2021 academic year and the second building (Marshgate 1) opening in phases from September 2022. Phase 1 of the development was intended to have 50,000 m^{2} (540,000 ft^{2}) of space, and to provide space for 4,000 extra students and 260 extra academic staff, while the entire UCL East campus, when completed, was expected to have 180,000 m^{2} (1,900,000 ft^{2}) of space, 40% of the size of UCL's central London campus. The outline planning permission was for up to 190,800 m^{2} (2,054,000 ft^{2}) of space with up to 160,060 m^{2} (1,722,900 ft^{2}) of academic development and research space (including up to 16,000 m^{2} (170,000 ft^{2}) of commercial research space), up to 50,880 m^{2} (547,700 ft^{2}) of student accommodation, and up to 4,240 m^{2} (45,600 ft^{2}) of retail space. Construction of phase 2 (Pool Street East and Marshfield 2, 3 and 4) was expected to begin in 2030 and be completed by 2034, and the whole project will support 2,337 academic staff and 11,169 students. The campus will include residences for up to 1,800 students.

In June 2018, UCL revealed that the UK government would be providing £100 million of funding for UCL East as part of its £151 million contribution to the £1.1 billion redevelopment of the Olympic Park as a cultural and education district to be known as the East Bank.

It was announced in August 2018 that a £215 million contract for construction of the largest building in the UCL East development, Marshgate 1, had been awarded to Mace, with building planned to begin in 2019 and be completed by 2022.

Construction work on UCL East began on 2 July 2019 with a ground breaking ceremony by the Mayor of London, Sadiq Khan, and work on Pool Street West began on 28 February 2020.

The first building at UCL East, renamed One Pool Street, was due to open in September 2022. However, supply chain challenges led to a delay in the building being handed over by the contractors, with students being relocated to other accommodation on short notice. One Pool Street was handed over to UCL in October 2022, with the first students moving into accommodation and teaching starting in November 2022.

UCL East was officially opened, along with the Marshgate building that completed phase 1 of the development, in September 2023 by Olympic gold medalist and UCL alumna Christine Ohuruogu.

== Campus ==
The UCL East campus consists of two buildings constructed in phase 1, One Pool Street and Marshgate, at the south end of the Queen Elizabeth Olympic Park, on either side of the Waterworks River. The campus has been designed for 4,000 students, 260 teaching staff and 400 support staff in phase 1. The two buildings have an area of 50,000 m^{2} (540,000 sq ft); the total area of the campus after the completion of an additional four buildings in phase 2 is expected to be 180,000 m^{2} (1,900,000 sq ft), 40 per cent of that of UCL's main Bloomsbury campus.

One Pool Street has accommodation for 552 students in two towers and three floors (4,600 m^{2}; 50,000 sq ft) of research and teaching space, including a lecture theatre that doubles as a 160-seat cinema. It opened in late 2022. It was shortlisted for the Architects' Journal Architecture Awards 2023 in the Higher Education category. It is on the east side of the Waterworks River.

Marshgate opened in 2023. It has 33,500 m^{2} (361,000 sq ft) of space for research and teaching and cost £250 million to construct. It has eight floors with a two-storey base containing a cafe, community hub and lecture theatre, and three 'vertical neighbourhoods' above, joined by a full-height atrium in the centre of the building. Rather than being home to any individual faculty, it is intended to support and foster cross-disciplinary teaching and research. It is on the west side of the Waterworks River, joined with One Pool Street by Thornton bridge, and just south of the ArcelorMittal Orbit sculpture and observation tower.

Marshgate and One Pool Street both received a 2026 RIBA National Award for architecture.
