= Singing Ringing Tree =

Singing Ringing Tree can refer to:

- The Singing Ringing Tree (Das singende, klingende Bäumchen) a 1957 German children's fantasy film
- Singing Ringing Tree (sculpture), a musical sculpture in England
