= Ghent Light Festival =

Belgian light festival

Ghent Light Festival Lichtfestival Gent
- Status: active
- Genre: light art
- Frequency: 2011, 2012, then triennial from 2015 to 2024
- Location: Ghent
- Country: Belgium
- Years active: 2011–2024
- Established: Ghent, 2011
- Most recent: Ghent, 2024

The Ghent Light Festival (Dutch: Lichtfestival Gent) is a free, open-air festival of light art held in Ghent, Belgium. Visitors follow a walking route of several kilometres past light installations, projections and video mappings on the city's buildings, squares and waterways.

The city first organised the festival in 2011 to showcase its scheme for lighting the historic centre known as the 'Ghent Light Plan'. Six editions were held between 2011 and 2024 and attendance peaked at 835,000 in 2018.

In December 2025, amid municipal budget cuts, the city decided to hold only one large event of this kind in the current council term. It set aside €1 million for a light or music spectacle in 2029, so no festival is planned for 2027.

== Ghent Light Plan ==
The festival grew out of the Ghent Light Plan, begun in 1998. The plan lights the city centre's streets and squares coherently and picks out monuments and landmark buildings, stressing architectural details that are less visible by day.

The plan was extended across the whole city from 2007, and a separate plan has covered the canal zone and port since 2011. It aims to save energy through LED lighting and to limit light pollution, and it has won several awards.

== History ==
=== 2011 and 2012: first editions ===
The Big Fire of Ghent That Never Happened (Michael Langeder) in 2011

The first festival ran from 27 to 29 January 2011. Around 20 international artists and lighting designers took part, and the organisers presented it as a celebration of the city's award-winning lighting plan. The route ran mainly through the historic centre.

Austrian-born artist Michael Langeder created the illusion of fire in the Belfry with The Big Fire of Ghent That Never Happened. Alberto Garutti's Ai Nati Oggi ("To those born today"), dating from 2011, makes a group of street lamps brighten softly whenever a child is born in Ghent. The edition drew about 160,000 visitors.

The festival returned a year later, from 26 to 29 January 2012, with about 30 works around a theme of happiness and music. Its centrepiece was La Cattedrale di Luce on Belfortstraat: a 28-metre wooden colonnade covered in 55,000 LEDs, its arches recalling Romanesque and Renaissance architecture. A work inspired by Maurice Maeterlinck was another highlight. Attendance rose to about 490,000.

=== 2013–2015: postponement and a triennial schedule ===
A third edition had been planned for January 2014. As part of municipal budget savings, the city's executive postponed it to 2015 and moved the festival to a three-year cycle, with editions planned for 2015 and 2018. Ghent's hotel and hospitality associations criticised the decision.

The city said the extra year gave its services more time to prepare. It also studied other festivals, including GLOW in Eindhoven, the Fête des Lumières in Lyon and the Amsterdam Light Festival. In October 2014 the city council approved a non-profit association, Lichtfestival vzw, to anchor the partnership. Its founders were the city, Ghent University, the Port of Ghent and the grid operator Eandis; the city remained the festival's initiator.

The third edition ran from 29 January to 1 February 2015, with work by 44 artists and Ghent University as partner. One of its most popular works was Cloud by Caitlind r.c. Brown and Wayne Garrett, made of 6,000 light bulbs that visitors themselves could control. Attendance rose to 640,000.

=== 2018 ===
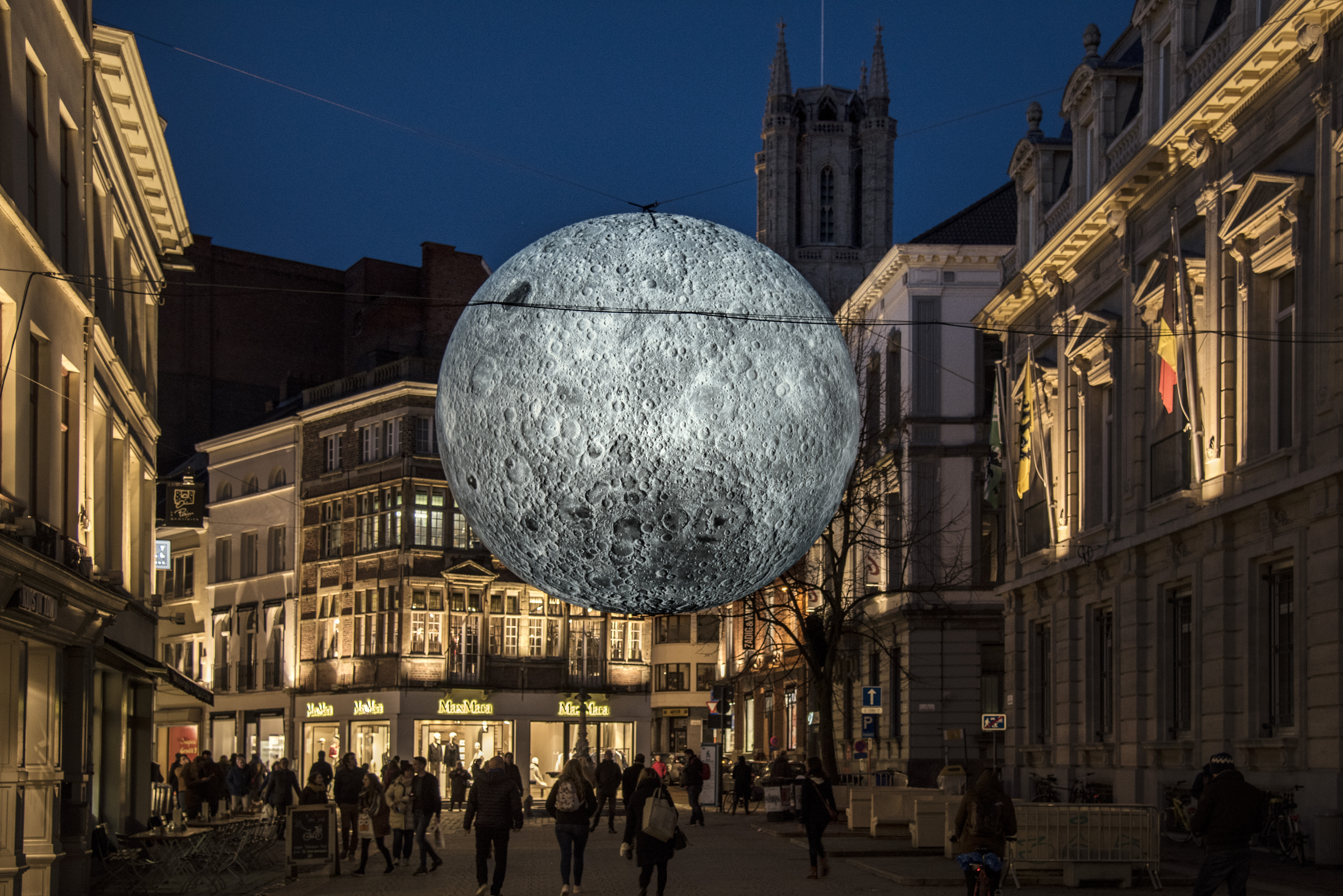
Museum of the Moon (Luke Jerram) in 2018

The fourth edition ran from 31 January to 4 February 2018. It presented 36 installations on a 6.6-kilometre route from Sint-Pietersplein to the Zonder-Naam Park, crossing the historic centre and a former industrial district. For the first time the lights came on at 7 pm rather than 6 pm.

Works included Luke Jerram's Museum of the Moon, a fire tornado on the River Lys by Dutch artist Ivo Schoofs, and nesting boxes by the collective tBEDRIJF that lit up in response to body heat. By then the festival had joined the International Light Festivals Organisation. Attendance reached a record 835,000.

=== 2021: tenth-anniversary edition ===
The fifth edition was originally scheduled for 27–31 January 2021. After postponements during the COVID-19 pandemic, it was held from 10 to 14 November 2021, as Ghent's first mass event since the pandemic began. It was organised by the city, Ghent University and the grid operator Fluvius.

To mark ten years, four favourites returned in altered form alongside 32 new works: The Big Fire of Ghent That Never Happened, La Cattedrale di Luce, Cloud and Museum of the Moon. Langeder's fire illusion moved from the Belfry to St Nicholas' Church. New works included Amanda Parer's Fantastic Planet, whose glowing creatures appeared to have just landed on Earth, and a participatory work using lampshades designed by more than 500 residents.

Pandemic measures shaped the event. The route ran one way with no fixed start or finish and was extended to 7.2 km; food and drink stalls were banned and face masks were mandatory. About 140,000 people came on the opening night, against 90,000 on the first day in 2018. On the second evening some 240,000 came, and around 8:30 pm the city urged people to stay away. Virologist Marc Van Ranst questioned the event's safety.

About a week later, with infections rising, the city cancelled its year-end events. The mayor said the festival had been able to go ahead because of its measures. Total attendance was 810,000.

=== 2024 ===
The sixth edition ran from 31 January to 4 February 2024. It showed 31 works on a route of about 7.2 km through the centre and the redeveloped Old Docks, taking visitors beyond the usual historic core. Eighteen of the makers were Belgian, fifteen of them from Ghent.

The edition was announced by a world premiere: Conos, a temporary installation of glowing cones by Spanish artist SpY on Voldersstraat in late 2023. Highlights included Studio FAH's Jacob, the Wise Snowman, which turned the statue of Jacob van Artevelde into a snowball. Claudia Reh's It's a Question of Blue lit the whole of Sleepstraat, made with residents and KASK art students. The European Space Agency contributed a projection on the Fluvius site.

The city counted 600,000 visitors, fewer than at the two previous editions. It attributed part of the drop to farmers' protests that blocked access roads in the first days.

== Future ==
After the 2024 edition the festival's website looked forward to a new edition in 2027. In December 2025, however, the city decided to hold only one large event of this kind in the current council term. It set aside a one-off €1 million for 2029 for a light or music spectacle with international appeal, to be staged by an external organiser. Press coverage in January 2026 confirmed that the festival would not return before 2029.

== Organisation and format ==
The festival is free and unticketed. Since 2014 it has been run through Lichtfestival vzw, a partnership led by the city with Ghent University and the regional grid operator (Eandis, later Fluvius). Each edition starts with an open call for artists, and many works are made with residents, schools and local organisations.

Since 2018 the festival has run for five evenings, Wednesday to Sunday, from 7 pm to midnight and from 6 pm on Sunday. Visitors follow a one-way route, and public street lighting along it is switched off; in 2024 the measured saving was 1,102.8 kWh. The festival is a member of the International Light Festivals Organisation and has signed its sustainability charter.

The 2024 edition cost €1.588 million including VAT, against €1.207 million in 2021. The city attributed most of the increase to inflation.

== Attendance ==
Attendance grew with each edition up to 2018. The November 2021 edition ran under pandemic rules, and the city linked the lower 2024 figure partly to farmers' road blockades.

== Reception and impact ==
The festival is popular with residents: the organisers say almost seven in ten Ghent residents visit at least once per edition. In 2024, almost 52% of visitors were first-timers and 15% came from abroad, mainly the Netherlands and France, up from 6% in 2021. A quarter of visitors from outside Ghent stayed overnight. The city estimated average spending at €46.86 per visitor, an economic return of almost €30 million.

The crowds have also drawn criticism. Hospitality businesses objected to the 2014 postponement, the 2021 edition was questioned on public-health grounds, and residents complained about parking during the festival. The city's own 2024 evaluation noted frustration when crowd-control bypasses hid some works at busy moments, and feedback asking for more large-scale projections and spectacle.

The festival has drawn international coverage. In 2018 the Italian design magazine Domus called it one of the winter's essential destinations for fans of light festivals. The city logged 214 media reports on the 2024 edition.

== Permanent works ==
Three light artworks linked to the festival have been installed permanently in Ghent; two of them lie on the city's Light Plan walking route.

- Ai Nati Oggi by Alberto Garutti (2011): street lamps that brighten softly whenever a child is born in Ghent.
- The Blue Birds of Mr Maeterlinck, which grew out of a highlight of the 2012 edition.
- Palimpsest by LAb[au], in Gentbrugge.
