= Clive Leach =

English cricketer (1934–2026)

Personal information
- Full name: Clive William Leach
- Born: 4 December 1934; Bombay, Bombay Presidency, British India
- Died: 20 March 2026 (aged 91)
- Batting: Right-handed
- Bowling: Slow left-arm orthodox

Domestic team information
- Years: Team
- 1965–1971: Buckinghamshire
- 1959–1964: Durham
- 1955–1958: Warwickshire

Career statistics
Competition	First-class	List A
Matches	39	5
Runs scored	1,025	76
Batting average	17.67	25.33
100s/50s	0/4	0/0
Top score	67	39*
Balls bowled	1,759	48
Wickets	26	1
Bowling average	25.26	48.00
5 wickets in innings	0	0
10 wickets in match	0	–
Best bowling	3/19	1/48
Catches/stumpings	28/–	2/–
- Source: ESPNcricinfo, 8 May 2011

Clive William Leach CBE (4 December 1934 – 20 March 2026) was an English cricketer. He was a right-handed batsman who bowled slow left-arm orthodox.

== Cricket career ==
Leach was born in Bombay, Bombay Presidency, British India. He made his first-class debut for Warwickshire against Cambridge University in 1955. He played 38 further first-class matches for Warwickshire, the last coming against Oxford University in 1958. In his 39 first-class matches for Warwickshire, he scored 1,025 runs at a batting average of 17.67, with 4 half centuries and a high score of 67. An able slip fielder, he took 28 catches. An all-rounder, Leach took 26 wickets at a bowling average of 25.26, with best figures of 3/19.

After being released by Warwickshire, Leach joined Durham for the 1959 season, making his Minor Counties Championship debut against Northumberland. He played Minor counties cricket for Durham from 1959 to 1965. It was for Durham that he made his List A debut against Hertfordshire in the 1964 Gillette Cup. He played a further List A match for Durham, which came in the same season against Sussex.

Leach later joined Buckinghamshire, making his debut for the county in the 1966 Minor Counties Championship against Berkshire. He played Minor counties cricket for Buckinghamshire from 1966 to 1971. He made 3 List A appearances for Buckinghamshire, against Middlesex in the 1969 Gillette Cup, Bedfordshire and Hampshire, both in the 1970 Gillette Cup.

== Business career ==
Leach began his business career in 1961 at the age of 27 when he began working for Tyne Tees Television. At the time, he retired from television in 1994, Leach was the chairman and chief executive of Yorkshire-Tyne Tees Television plc.

Leach carried out a number of senior public sector roles in the Yorkshire and Leeds City regions between 1995 and 2005, including as chairman of the Yorkshire Training and Enterprise Council, the Leeds Learning and Skills Council, and Yorkshire Enterprise Ltd. He was chairman of the Leeds Health Authority, spearheading the merger between the Leeds General Infirmary and St James' Hospital. He took over as chairman of Yorkshire Fund Managers in 2008. In 2016, he was appointed chairman of Be Independent Ltd, a company supporting independence for old and disabled people in the York city area. He was a past president of Harrogate International Festivals.

== Later life and death ==
In 2004, Leach was appointed chairman of the Durham County Cricket Club, which by this time a club had first-class status. He stepped down in 2016 during negotiations with the English Cricket Board over financial disagreement with them. In his 12 years as chairman, Durham won three County Championship titles and two major cup trophies, and held their first Test matches, including an "Ashes" Test. He was succeeded by Sir Ian Botham.

Leach later owned and served as the chairman of the Universe Media Group Ltd, publishers of Catholic Universe, Britain's largest-circulation Catholic weekly newspaper; the Catholic Times; and the Church and Heritage Building magazine. On 10 June 2021, it was announced that the Catholic Universe and Catholic Times newspapers would close, with that week's editions being the last.

Leach died from pneumonia on 20 March 2026, at the age of 91.

== Awards ==
In 2000, Leach was awarded the CBE for his services to training and education. He was awarded a Papal Knighthood – KSG – in January 2018 for services to the Catholic faith.
