= Gaia (Jerram) =

Art installation

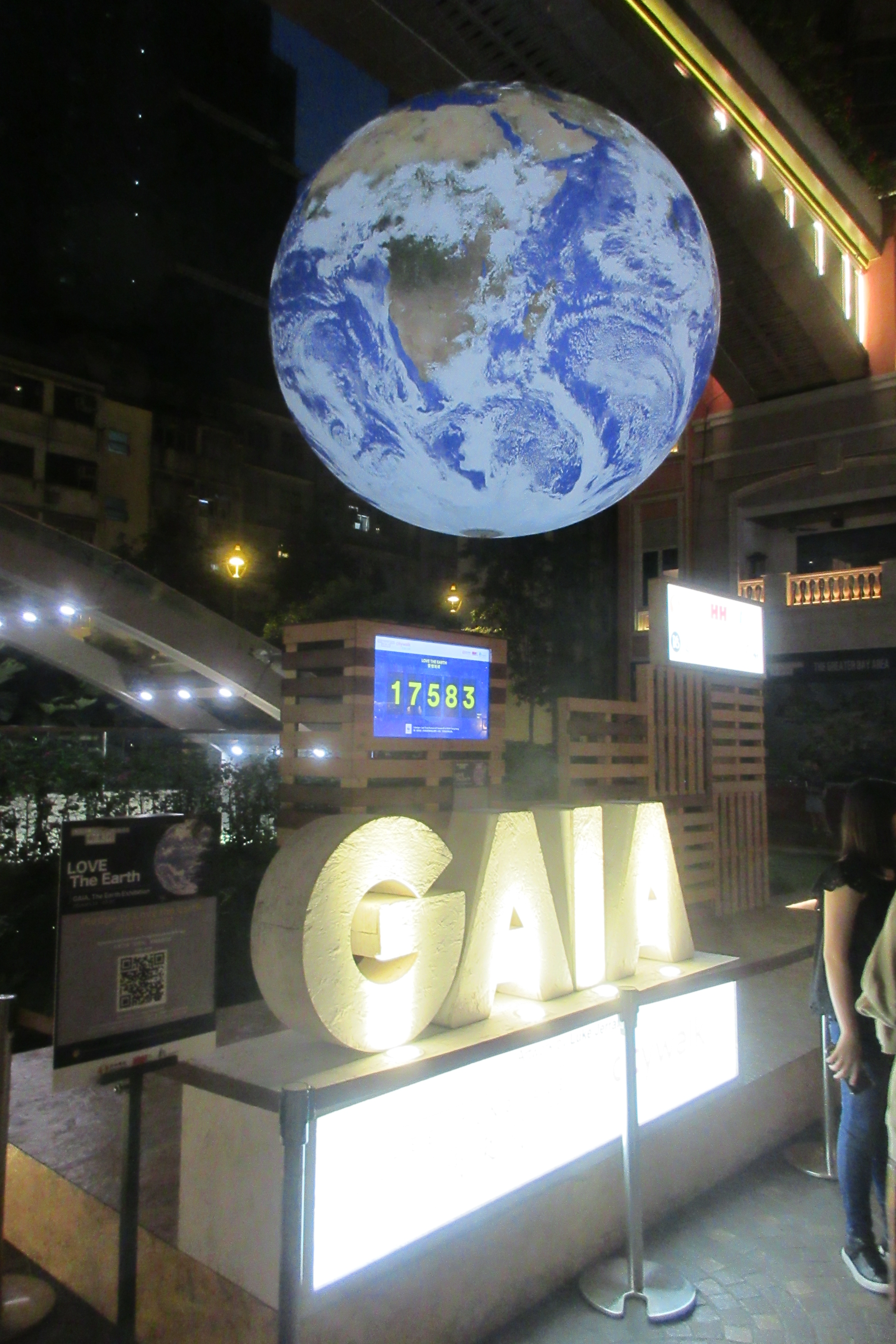
Gaia exhibited in Hong Kong in 2019 on Lee Tung Street

Gaia is a 2018 inflatable installation artwork by Luke Jerram. It is a spherical replica of the Earth, with a diameter of 7 metres (23 ft), and named after the Greek primordial goddess Gaia, personification of the Earth. It emulates Jerram's 2016 Museum of the Moon, a similar 7 metres (23 ft) spherical replica of the Moon.

== Description ==
The sculpture is based on a helium balloon made by Cameron Balloons, covered with 50 panels of 120dpi printed imagery of the Earth's surface from multiple satellite images stitched together, at a scale of about 1:1,800,000, or 1 centimetre (0.39 in) to 18 kilometres (11 mi). The sphere is lit internally when installed in a dark place to create a glowing floating orb. When viewed from a distance of 211 m (692 ft), Gaia is the same size as the Earth seen from the Moon.

The work has been compared to The Blue Marble, the 1972 photograph of the Earth by either Ron Evans or Harrison Schmitt, astronauts from Apollo 17. Its physical impact is said to create a form of overview effect in some observers.

== Exhibition ==
Gaia was first shown the Bluedot Festival at Jodrell Bank in Cheshire in 2018. An example was shown at the COP26 meeting in Glasgow in 2021, and at the COP30 meeting in Belém in 2025.

Several copies tour the world for temporary exhibitions, often accompanied by music, with copies in the collections of several public museums. As of June 2026, there are ongoing exhibitions at the Canadian Museum of Nature in Ottawa, the Museum of Science in Boston, and the library of Trinity Collage, Dublin.

A version designed to float on water, entitled Floating Earth, toured from 2021 to 2024, intended to trigger the overview effect.

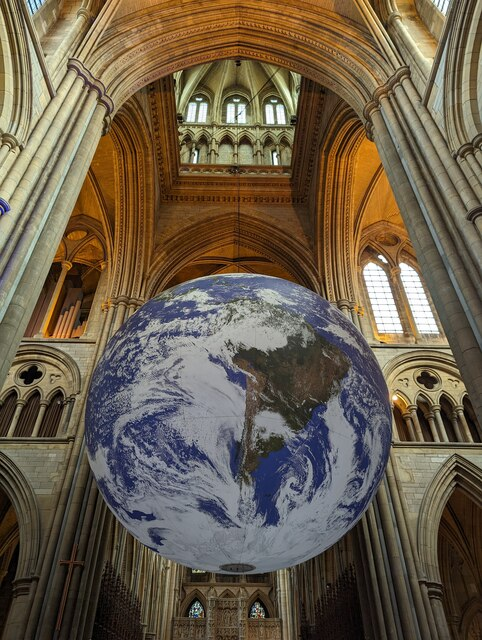
Truro Cathedral

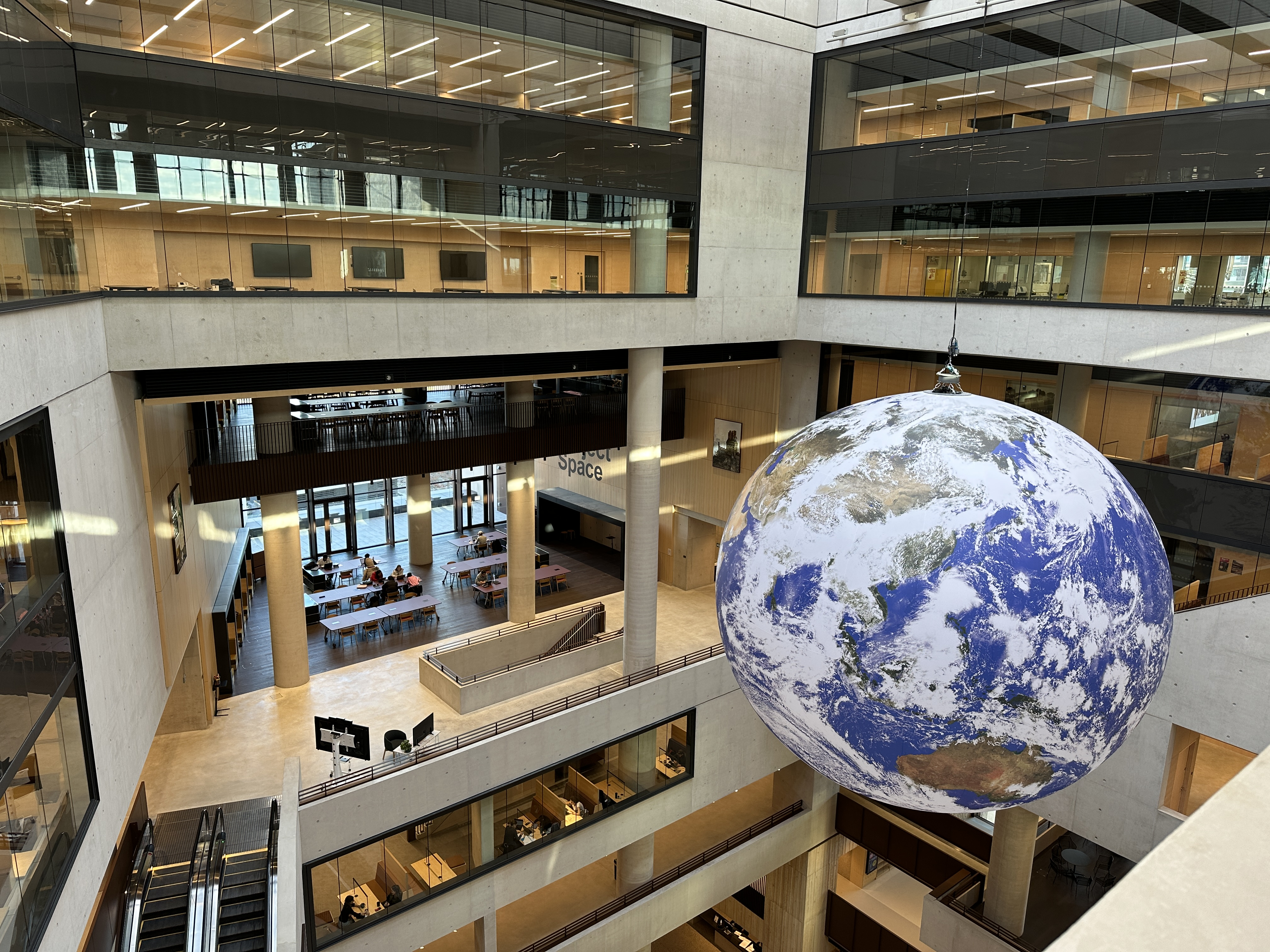
UCL East, London

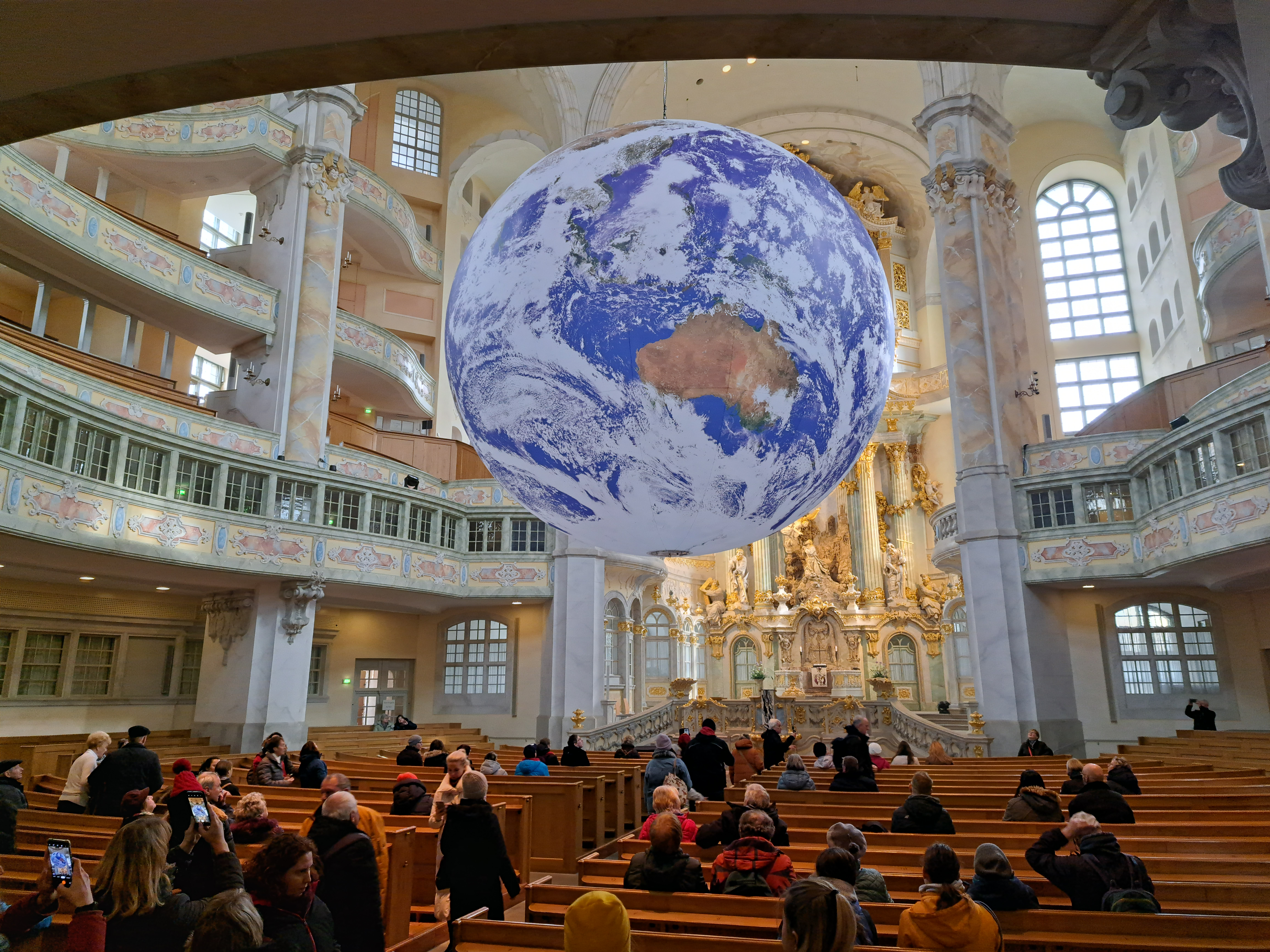
Frauenkirche, Dresden
