= Paola Lettieri =

British-Italian chemical engineer

Paola Lettieri FREng FIChemE
- Education: Sapienza University of Rome; University College London
- Scientific career
- Workplaces: University College London
- Thesis: A study of the influence of temperature on the flow behaviour of solid materials in a gas fluidized bed. (1999)

Paola Lettieri is a British-Italian chemical engineer who is a Professor of Chemical Engineering and Pro-Provost of UCL East at University College London. Her research considers fluidisation and life-cycle assessment. She has developed novel, sustainable fluid-bed processes.

== Early life and education ==
Lettieri is from Italy. She attended the Sapienza University of Rome, where she graduated Laurea in 1994. Lettieri then moved to the United Kingdom, where she completed graduate research at University College London. Her research considered the impact of temperature flow behaviour in a gas fluidised bed. Lettieri joined BP Chemicals after graduating.

== Research and career ==
In 2001 Lettieri joined the chemical engineering faculty at University College London. On starting her academic career, she was funded by a research fellowship from the Royal Academy of Engineering. She was the first woman engineer to be awarded such an honour. She was elected a Fellow of the Institution of Chemical Engineers in 2007.

Lettieri's research considers fluidisation and life-cycle assessment. She was initially interested in waste gasification. She worked with Advanced Plasma Power on the combination of gasification and plasma conversion, producing a versatile synthetic gas from its waste. The process collects waste, separates metals, plastic and glass and converts it into refuse-derived fuels. When these refuse-derived fuels are pumped into the gasifier vessel, synthetic gas in produced. The gas, which is composed of carbon monoxide, carbon dioxide, hydrogen and steam, is passed through a plasma converter. The resulting gas can be used for heating and electricity generation.

At University College London, Lettieri worked as vice dean of strategic projects. In that capacity, she oversaw the development of UCL East in the Queen Elizabeth Olympic Park. In 2021 Lettieri was elected a Fellow of the Royal Academy of Engineering.

== Selected publications ==
- Sultan M. Al-Salem; P Lettieri; J. Baeyens (2009). "Recycling and recovery routes of plastic solid waste (PSW): a review". Waste Management. 29 (10): 2625–2643. doi:10.1016/j.wasman.2009.06.004. ISSN 0956-053X. PMID 19577459. Wikidata Q37541130.
- Sara Evangelisti; Paola Lettieri; Domenico Borello; Roland Clift (7 October 2013). "Life cycle assessment of energy from waste via anaerobic digestion: a UK case study". Waste Management. 34 (1): 226–237. doi:10.1016/j.wasman.2013.09.013. ISSN 0956-053X. PMID 24112851. Wikidata Q39335469.
- Al-Salem, S.M.; Lettieri, P.; Baeyens, J. (1 February 2010). "The valorization of plastic solid waste (PSW) by primary to quaternary routes: From re-use to energy and chemicals". Progress in Energy and Combustion Science. 36 (1): 103–129. doi:10.1016/j.pecs.2009.09.001. ISSN 0360-1285.
