= Singing Ringing Tree (sculpture) =

Sound sculpture in Lancashire, England

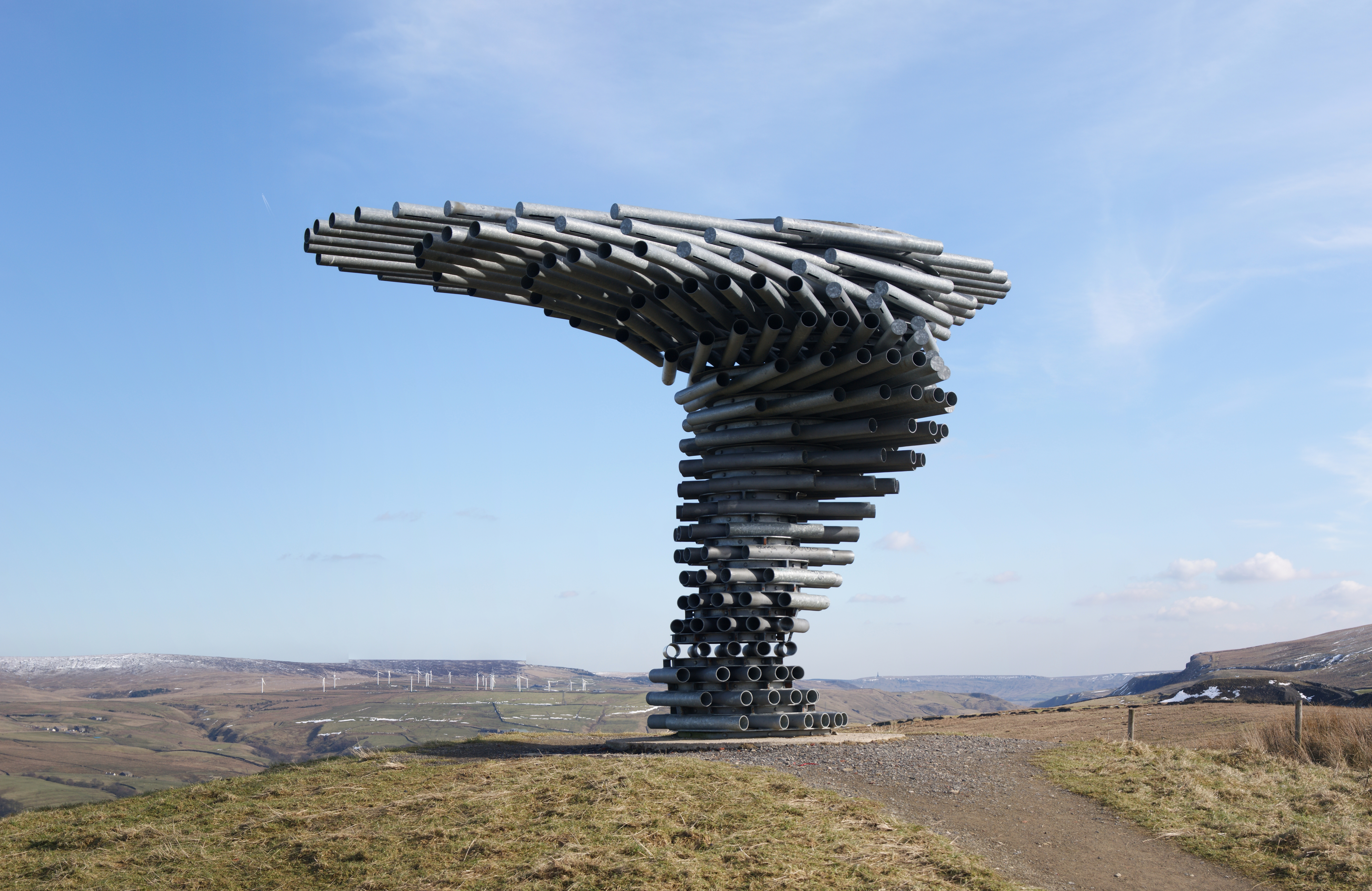

- Location in the Borough of Burnley
- Artist: Mike Tonkin and Anna Liu
- Year: 2006
- Dimensions: 3 m (9.8 ft)
- Location: 53°45′23.90″N 2°13′37.99″W

The Singing Ringing Tree is a wind-powered sound sculpture resembling a windswept tree set in the landscape of the Pennine hill range overlooking Burnley, in Lancashire, England.

Completed in 2006, it is part of the series of four sculptures within the Panopticons arts and regeneration project created by the East Lancashire Environmental Arts Network (ELEAN). The project was set up to erect a series of 21st-century landmarks, or Panopticons (structures providing a comprehensive view), across East Lancashire as symbols of the renaissance of the area.

Sound of wind through Singing Ringing Tree on a still and foggy December afternoon

Designed by architects Mike Tonkin and Anna Liu of Tonkin Liu, the Singing Ringing Tree is a 3-metre (10 ft) tall construction comprising pipes of galvanised steel which harness the energy of the wind to produce a slightly discordant and penetrating choral sound covering a range of several octaves. Some of the pipes are primarily structural and visual elements, while others have been cut across their width enabling the sound. The harmonic and singing qualities of the tree were produced by tuning the pipes according to their length by adding holes to the underside of each.

In 2007, the sculpture won (along with 13 other candidates) the National Award of the Royal Institute of British Architects (RIBA) for architectural excellence.

== Other similar sculptures ==
In March 2017, a second Singing Ringing Tree was set on the outskirts of Austin, Texas in the United States in the rural area of a small town called Manor.

The Singing Ringing Tree sculpture was donated to the City of Abilene in July 2022 by its owner in the Austin, Texas, area. The anonymous donor covered the installation and moving costs, which were arranged by the Abilene Cultural Affairs Council. The council contracted with JK Welding to dismantle and reassemble the sculpture, which is composed of nearly 27 tons of pipes, east of the Frontier Texas! museum in the grassy median where Treadaway Boulevard splits and flows into South 1st St. The sculpture's position has been optimized to maximize the wind blowing across the pipes, taking advantage of wind channeled through two nearby underpasses. However, the sculpture is mostly silent in the Abilene location, with director of the Abilene Cultural Affairs Council admitting that “most [visitors] haven’t heard it yet.” The reason why the tubes have failed to consistently produce noise is unknown.

While the exact location is unknown, Tonkin Liu also helped in the creation of a third sculpture which is found somewhere in Saudi Arabia.

== See also ==
- Sibelius Monument Helsinki
- Blackpool High Tide Organ
- Halo (artwork)
- Aeolus Acoustic Wind Pavilion
