= Festival of Lights (Lyon) =

Celebration on December 8 in Lyon, France

Fête des Lumières
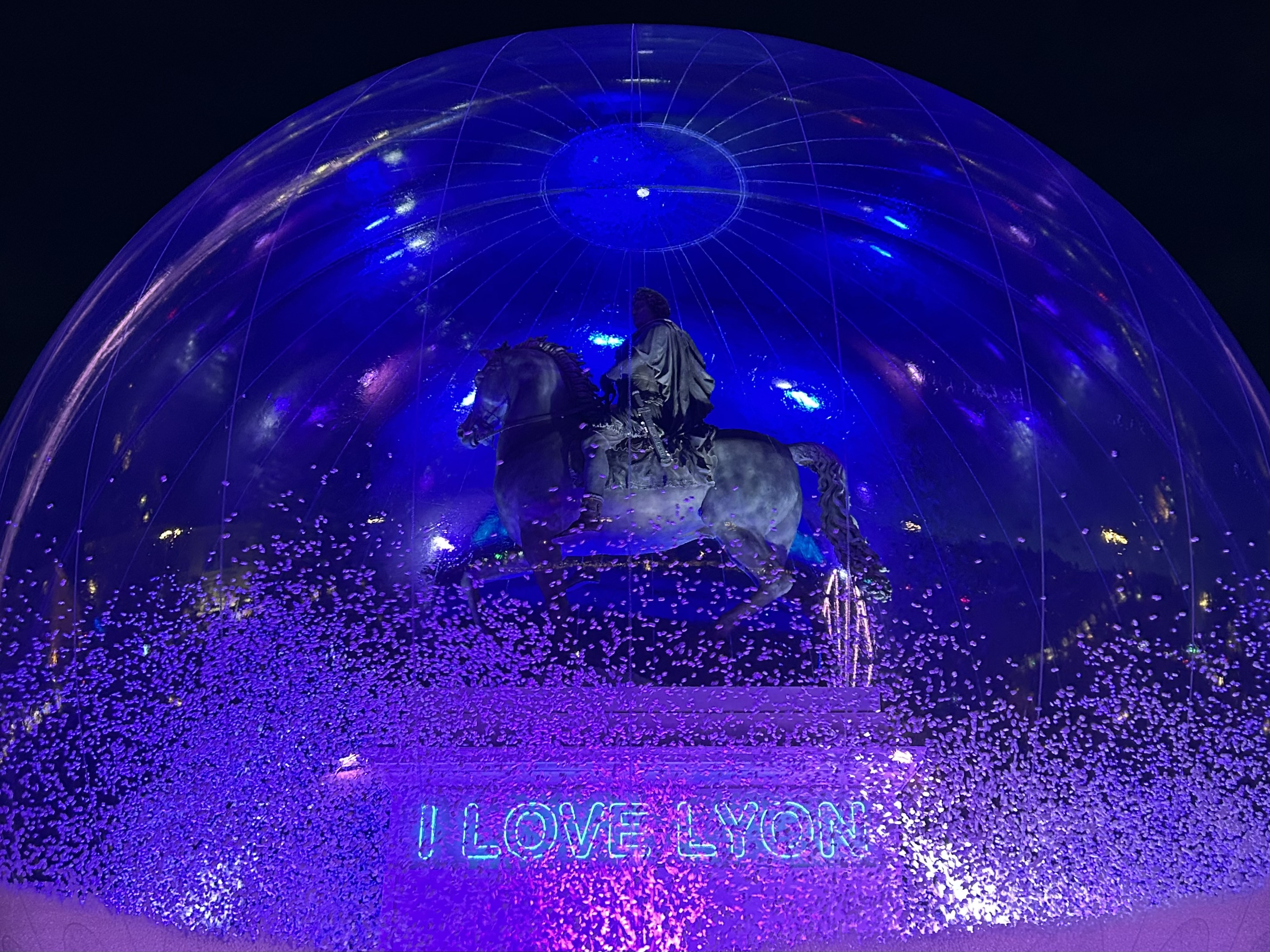
- The artwork "I Love Lyon" displayed in place Bellecour during the 2024 edition.
- Official name: Fête des Lumières de Lyon
- Also called: 8-Décembre
- Observed by: Lyon, France
- Liturgical color: Marian blue
- Significance: Immaculate Conception
- Observances: Candles at windows, screenings on famous buildings and monuments, lightning objects in squares and in parks
- Date: Around December 8
- Duration: 4 days
- Frequency: Annual
- First time: 1999
- Started by: Municipality of Lyon

The Festival of Lights (French: Fête des lumières, [fɛt de lymjɛʁ]) in Lyon, France, is a popular event that originally aimed at expressing gratitude toward Mary, mother of Jesus, around December 8 of each year. This Lyonnaise tradition dictates that every house place candles along the outsides of all the windows to produce a spectacular effect throughout the streets. The festival includes other activities based on light and usually lasts four days, with the peak of activity occurring on the 8th. The two main focal points of activity are typically the Basilica of Fourvière which is lit up in different colours, as well as the Place des Terreaux, which hosts a different light show each year.

== History ==
=== Spared from plague ===
The origins of the festival date to 1643 when Lyon was struck by plague. On September 8, 1643, the municipal councillors (échevins) promised to pay tribute to Mary if the town was spared. Ever since, a solemn procession makes its way to the Basilica of Fourvière on 8 December (the feast of the Immaculate Conception) to light candles and give offerings in the name of Mary. In part, the event thus commemorates the day Lyon was consecrated to the Virgin Mary.

=== Inauguration of a statue ===
In 1852, it became a popular festival when a statue of the Virgin Mary was erected next to the Basilica, overlooking the city. Now a focal point of the festival, the statue was created by the renowned sculptor Joseph-Hugues Fabisch and was sponsored by several notable Lyonnais Catholics. It was then accepted by Maurice Cardinal de Bonald in 1850. The inauguration of the statue was due to take place on September 8, 1852, the day of celebration of the Nativity of the Virgin. However, the flooding of the Saône prevented the statue from being ready. The archbishop, with the agreement of a committee of lay people, therefore chose to move the date back to the 8 December.

By 1852, in Lyon, December 8 had already been a celebration for the Immaculate Conception of the Virgin. Leading up to the inauguration, everything was in place for the festivities: The statue was lit up with flares, fireworks were readied for launching from the top of Fourvière Hill and marching bands were set to play in the streets. The prominent Catholics of the time suggested lighting up the façades of their homes as was traditionally done for major events such as royal processions and military victories.

However, on the morning of the big day, a storm struck Lyon. The master of ceremonies hastily decided to cancel everything and to push back the celebrations once more to the following Sunday. In the end, the skies cleared and the people of Lyon, who had been eagerly anticipating the event, spontaneously lit up their windows, descended into the streets and lit flares to illuminate the new statue and the Chapel of Notre-Dame-de-Fourvière, later superseded by the Basilica. The people sang songs and cried "Vive Marie!" until late in the night. This celebration was then repeated from year to year.

== Custom ==
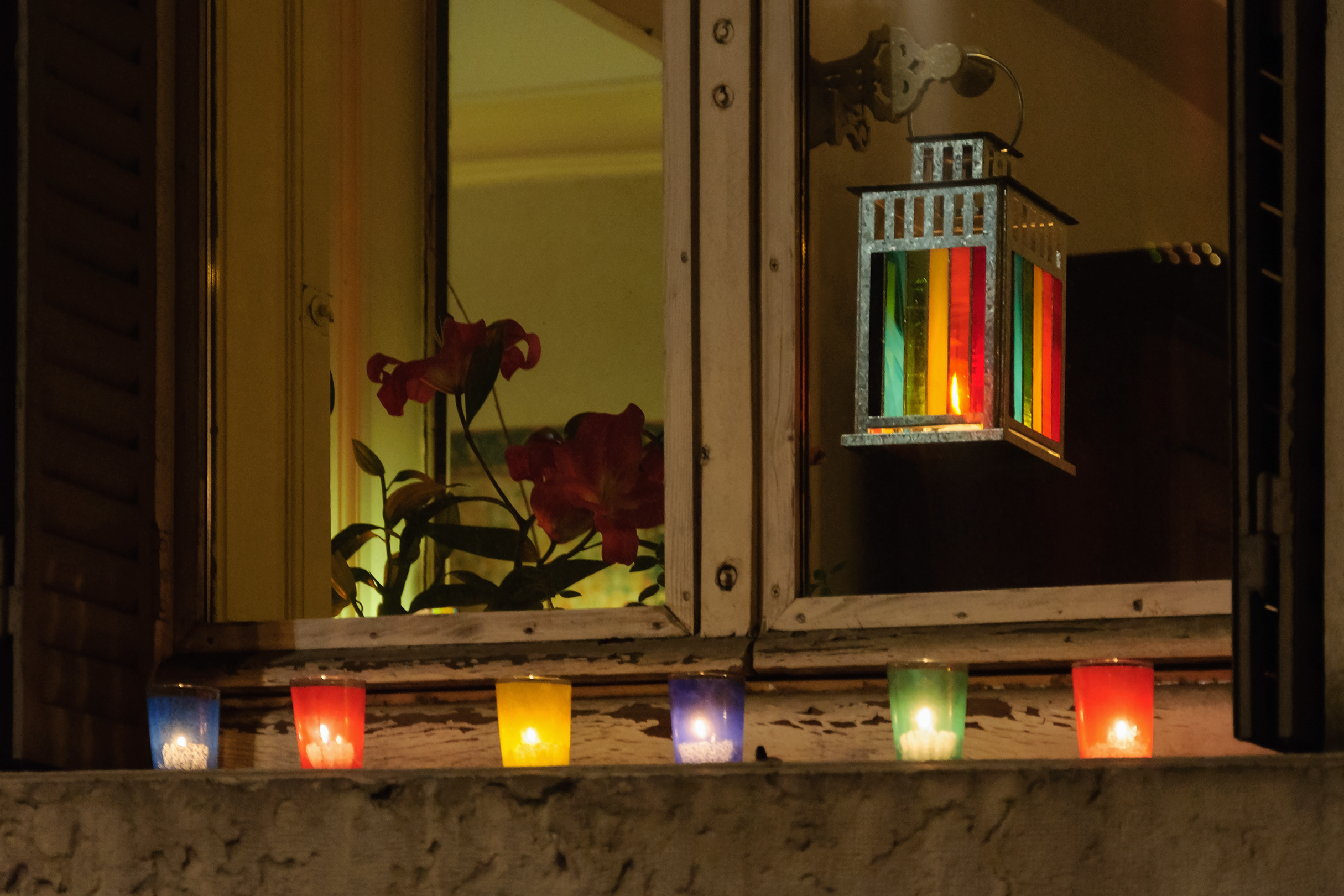
Candle lights on a windowsill on December 8.

Tradition now mandates that many families in Lyon keep, often along with their Christmas decorations, a collection of stained or clear glass in which candles are burnt on windowsills on 8 December. These stout, fluted candles can be found in shops towards the end of November.

During the nights of Festival of Lights, multiple areas of the city are reserved for pedestrians only. The festival typically features light shows, performances and food vendors.

Historians note the rather misinformed notions that the people of Lyon have concerning the celebration's origins: confusion over the thanks given to Mary, as well as the dates involved, leads people to think the celebration commemorates the establishment of the Basilica of Notre-Dame de Fourvière or a wish granted after a plague supposedly struck in the 19th century.

The festival draws 3 to 4 million people each year.

== Security measures after 13 November 2015 ==
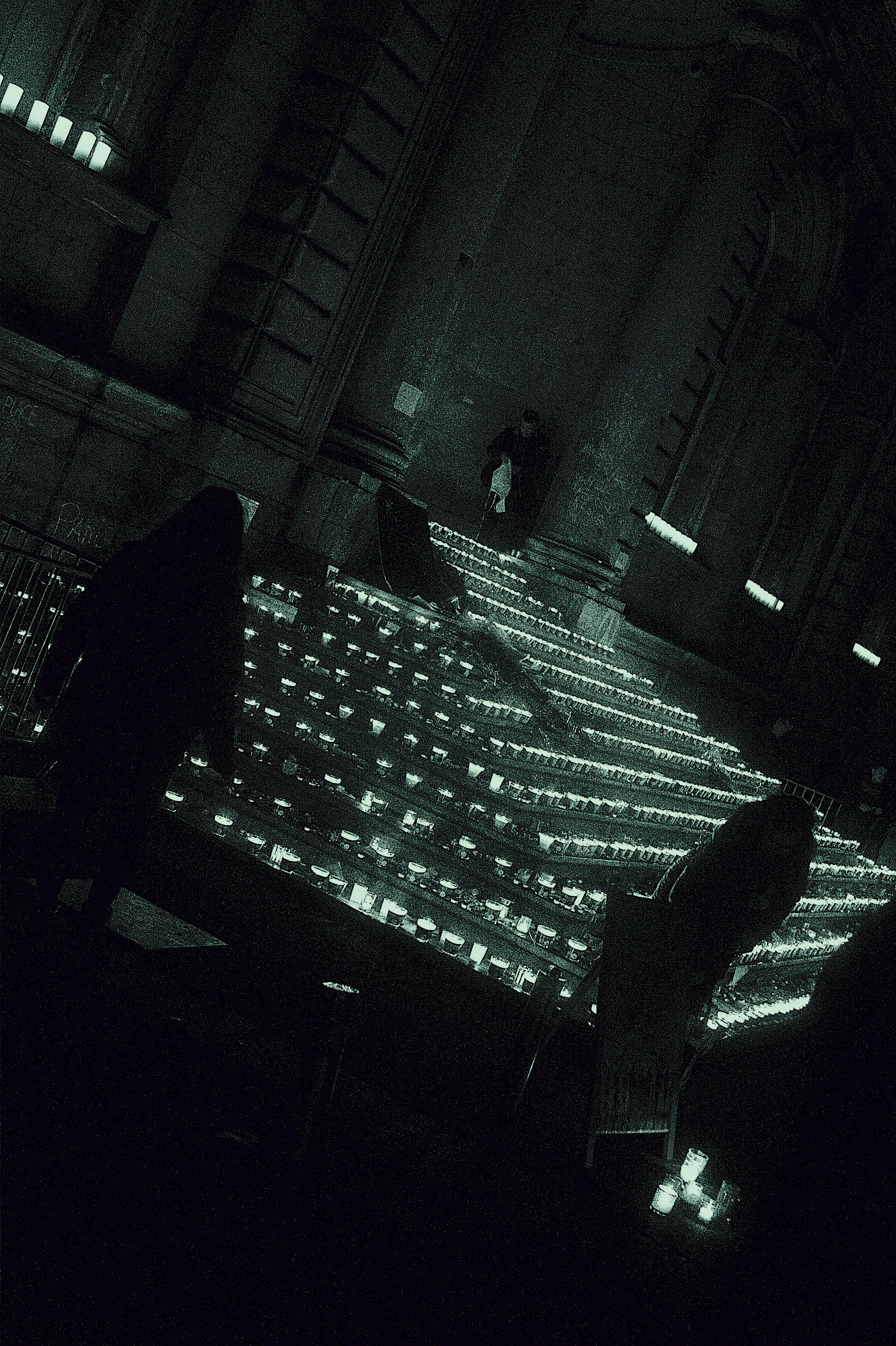
Festival of Lights, City Hall, Lyon, December 8, 2015.

On 19 November 2015, six days after the attack on the Bataclan in Paris, Gérard Collomb announced the cancelation of the festival because a national state of emergency had been declared. The festival was limited to the traditional lumignon candles and an installation which paid tribute to the victims of the terrorist attacks, whose first names were displayed over the buildings of the quays. Because of the continuing risk of attacks, the 2016 edition of the festival took place in a smaller area than usual and lasted for three days instead of four. Security inspections were conducted at entrances to the event and additional security forces were provided by the Minister of the Interior.

== See also ==
- Lumiere (festival), UK's largest light festival
- Ghent Light Festival in Belgium
