= Dream Director =

Sonic art installation

The Dream Director was a touring installation by artist Luke Jerram, which continued the artist's exploration of creating art inside people's heads ("on the edges of perception") rather than in the physical world. It was first staged in Bristol in 2007, and toured in subsequent years.

Participants in the Dream Director (usually 20 in total) stayed overnight in specially designed sleep pods. Each participant wore an eye mask which detected Rapid Eye Movement. When a mask detected the participant was in REM sleep - and was therefore probably dreaming - the participant was played a short sound clip through speakers embedded in the sleep pod. Each participant was assigned a certain sound set for the night, although they would not find out what sounds they were being played until the following morning (after they had written down any dreams they had). Each sound set was a group of sound effects with a specific theme: early experiments showed that being played a wide variety of sound effects confused and exhausted the sleeper.

By playing themed sounds to sleepers when they are dreaming, it was hoped to alter the content of their dreams. For instance, sound effects evoking large echoey spaces might result in dreams set in large or open spaces. The question of whether a participant's altered dream could be said to be art is still open to debate, and indeed Jerram encourages this discussion.

Participants' dreams were analysed by sleep researchers at the University of the West of England. One possible outcome of this research was to see if techniques similar to the Dream Director can help people who suffer from sleep disorders such as recurring nightmares.
