= Aeolus Acoustic Wind Pavilion =

Musical art installation by Luke Jerram

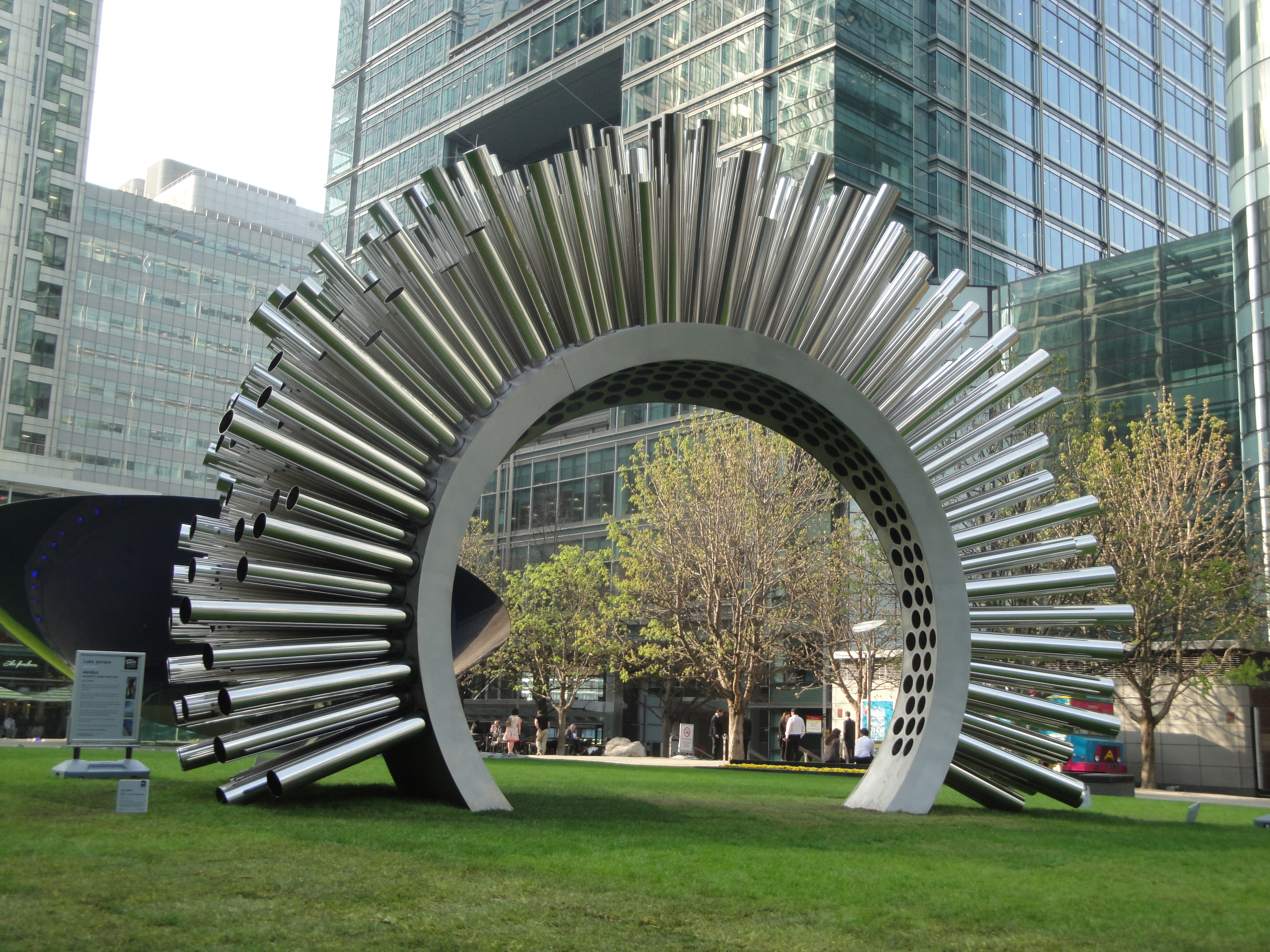
- The installation at Canary Wharf

String instrument
- Classification: Chordophone
- Inventor: Luke Jerram
- Developed: 21st century

The Aeolus Acoustic Wind Pavilion is a musical installation artwork created by Luke Jerram. It is a large aeolian harp that was inspired by Jerram's time in Iran. The installation toured England from 2011 to 2012, appearing at Lyme Park, the Eden Project, MediaCityUK and Canary Wharf.

== Origins ==
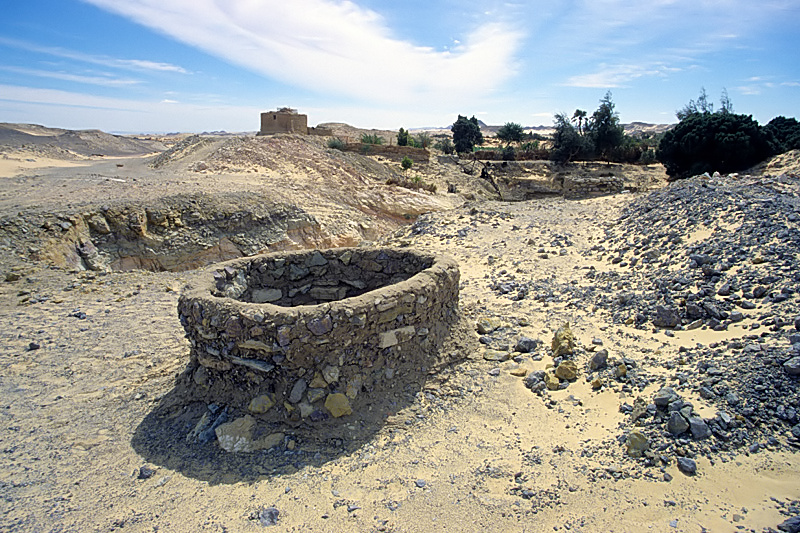
The shaft of a Libyan qanat. Some noises produced by a qanat inspired Jerram to create Aeolus.

The pavilion was created by Luke Jerram, an artist from Bristol, with help from Tim Waters (University of Southampton), Ian Drumm (University of Salford) and the Arup Group. Funding was provided by Arts Council England (who provided £95,000), the Engineering and Physical Sciences Research Council and Outokumpu.

The installation is named after Aeolus, the Ancient Greek ruler of the winds. Jerram first conceptualized the installation in 2007 during a spell in Yazd, Iran. While speaking with a well-digger working on a qanat, the digger mentioned that the qanat would sometimes make sounds at times when there was wind. This inspired Jerram to create a piece of architecture that "would resonate and sing with the wind".

== Design ==
Aeolus is an aeolian harp, a stringed instrument that produces music using the wind. Nylon strings are stretched along the tubes, which amplify the strings' sounds. During times that there is no wind, tubes with no strings play low tones in the aeolian mode. The sounds Aeolus produces have been likened to the minimalist music of Steve Reich.

The installation's design takes cues from religious architecture, such as St. Peter's Basilica and the domes of mosques. Jerram used 310 polished stainless steel tubes to create the piece. The installation is 6 metres (20 ft) tall and weighs around 10,000 kilograms (22,000 lb). Each tube measures 2.5 metres (8 ft 2 in) in length.

== Touring ==
Aelous toured England from 2011 to 2012. The tour began at Lyme Park where it was in display from 6-20 August 2011. It then appeared at the Eden Project from 19 September to 9 October. During its time at the Eden Project, an exhibition showcasing Aeolus' creation took place at the Royal West of England Academy. The installation then displayed at MediaCityUK from 22 October before finishing with a spell at Canada Square Park in Canary Wharf, London from 27 March to 10 May 2012.
