= Museum of the Moon =

Installation artwork

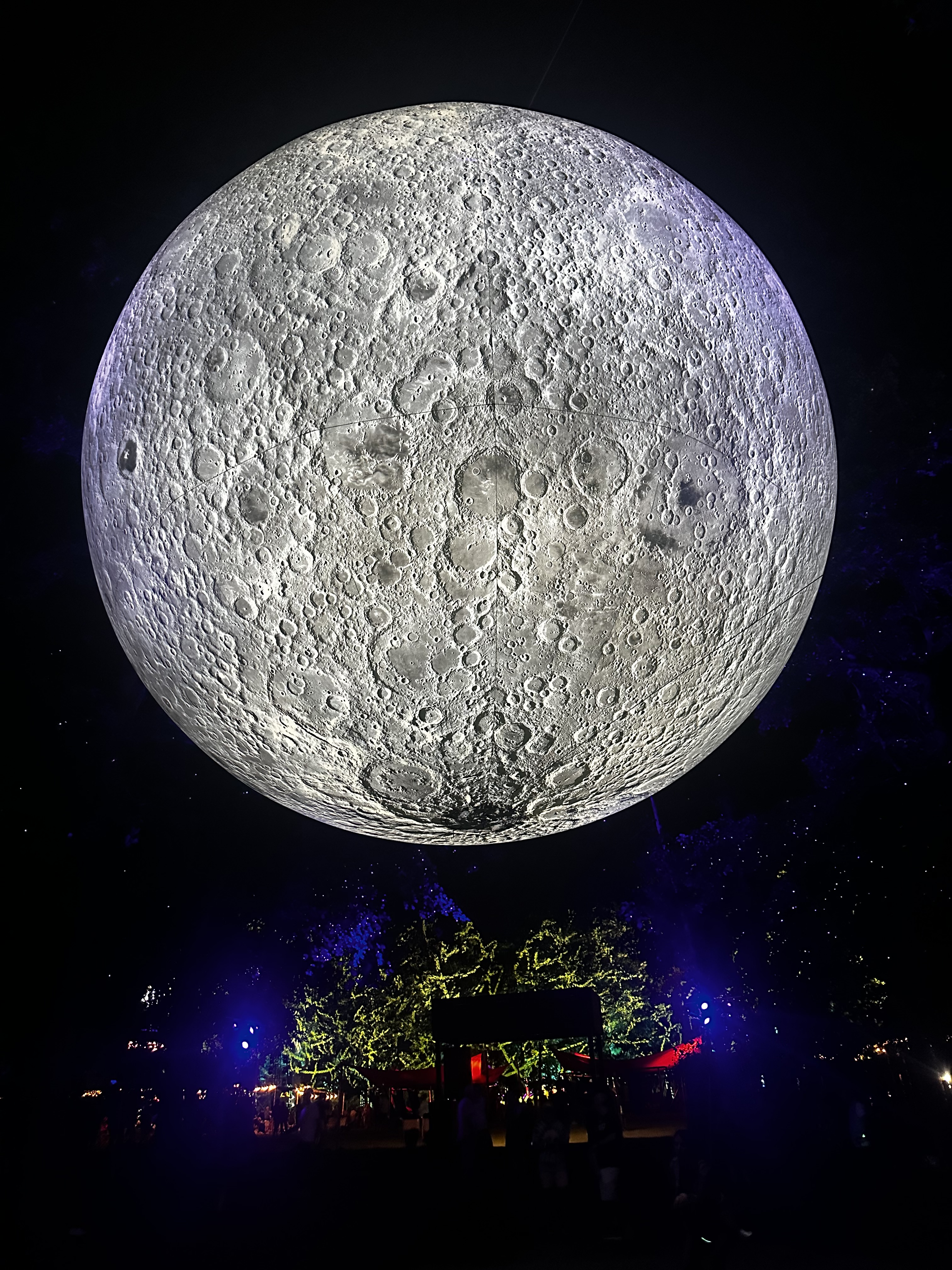
Museum of the Moon at 2024 music festival in Dover, Delaware

Museum of the Moon is a 2016 inflatable installation artwork by Luke Jerram. It is a spherical model of the Moon, with a diameter of 7 metres (23 ft). Several copies tour the world for temporary exhibitions, often accompanied by music. There are also copies in museums in Barcelona and Sydney.

== History ==
Jerram was inspired to create an artwork of the Moon after observing the wide tidal range of a local waterway when he lived in Bristol. The helium balloon was made by Cameron Balloons, initially funded by the UK Association of Science and Discovery Centres and the UK Space Agency, using ripstop material coated with urethane. The surface of the sphere is decorated with 120dpi printed imagery of the Moon's surface from NASA's Lunar Reconnaissance Orbiter, stitched together by the Astrogeology Science Centre of the United States Geological Survey, at a scale of about 1:500,000, or 1 centimetre (0.39 in) to 5 kilometres (3.1 mi). When installed in a dark place, the sphere is lit internally to create a glowing floating orb. Although the surface of the balloon is smooth, the fine detail of the imagery gives the impression that it is textured.

After six months of work, the artwork was first exhibited at the Bristol International Balloon Fiesta in June 2016, but high winds caused it to burst within a few minutes. It was quickly repaired and the original balloon and its reproductions have been exhibited many times since. In 2018, Jerram completed a similar 7 metres (23 ft) spherical artwork of the Earth viewed from space, at a scale of 1 centimetre (0.39 in) to 18 kilometres (11 mi).

== Gallery ==
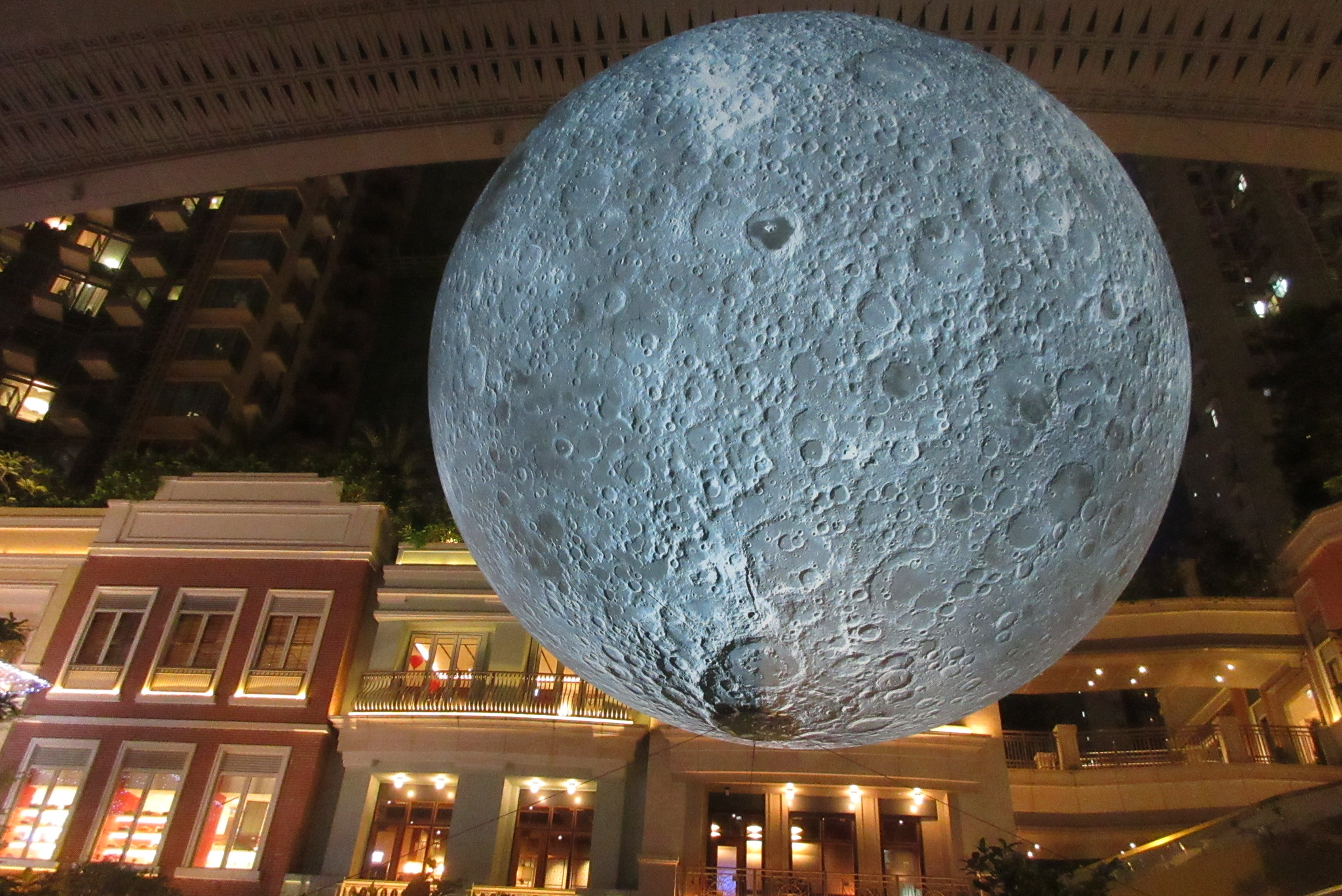
Hong Kong in 2017

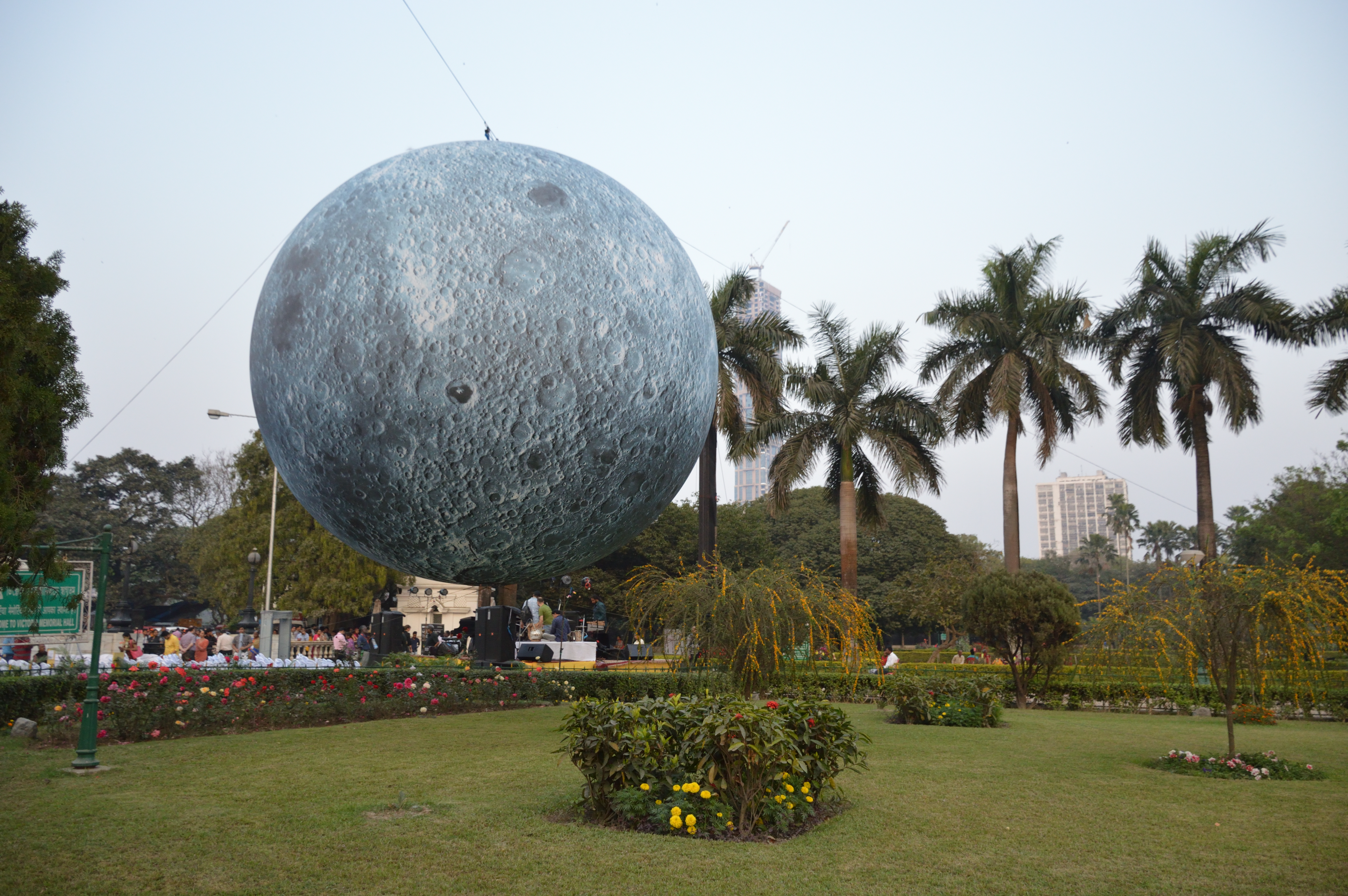
Kolkata in 2018

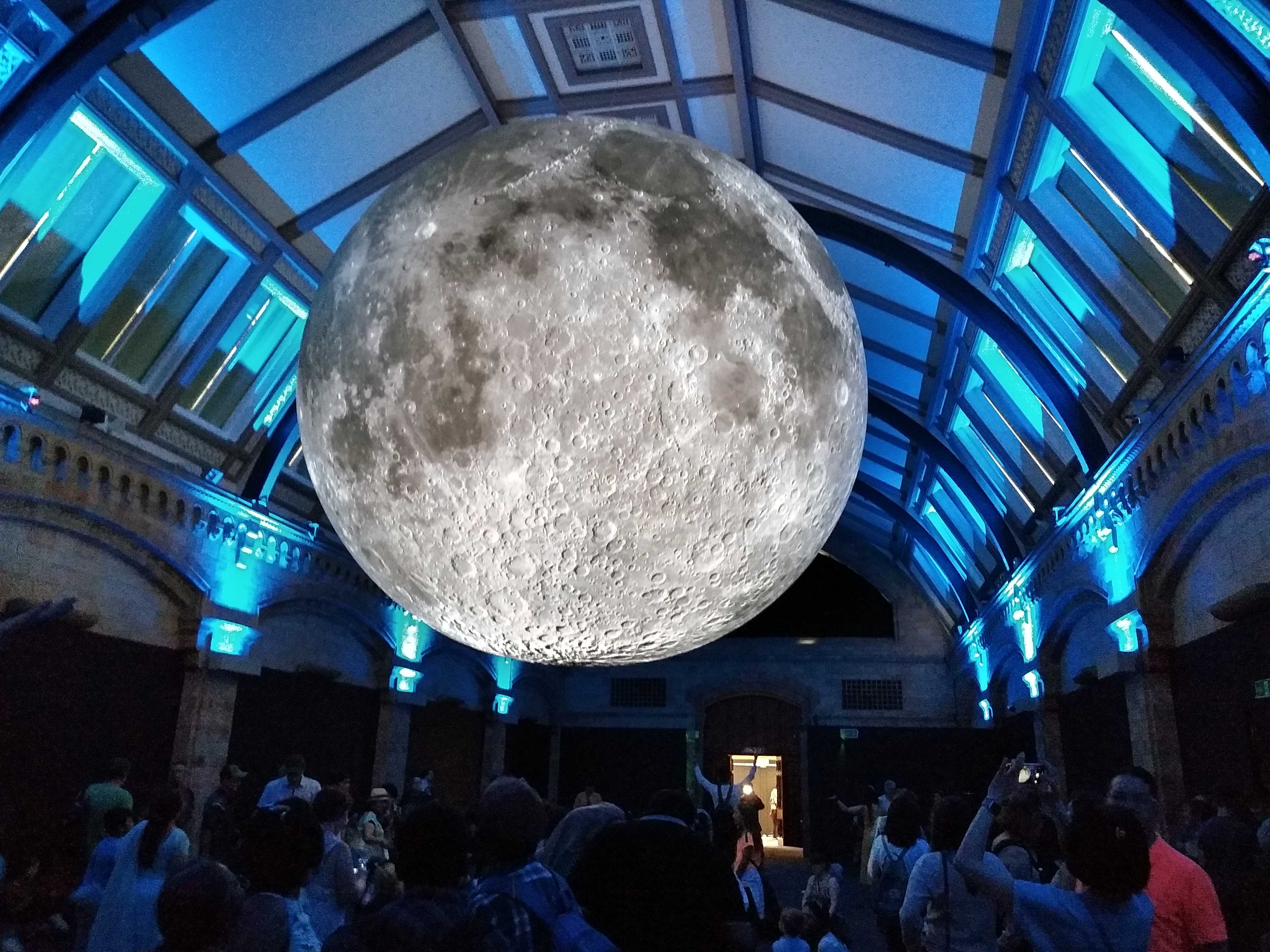
Natural History Museum, London, in 2019
