= Luke Jerram =

British artist

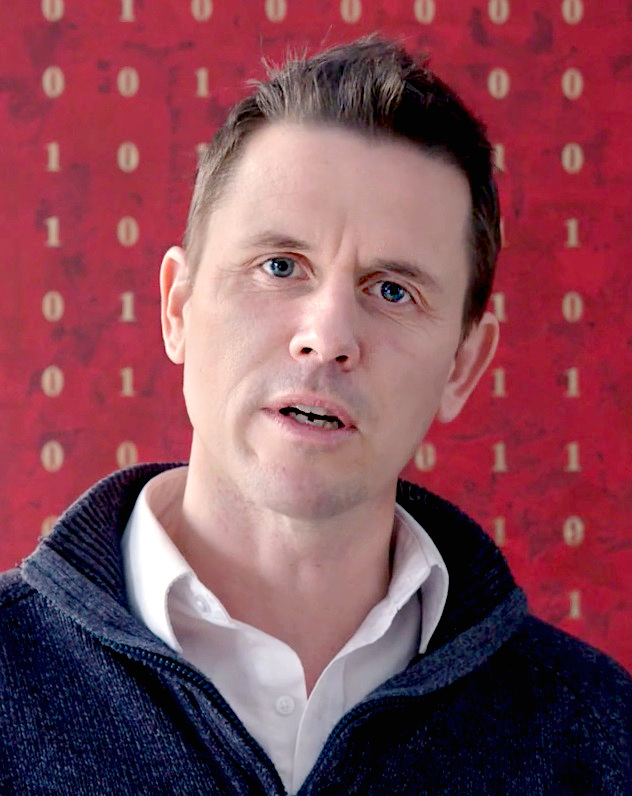
Luke Jerram in 2017

Luke Jerram (born 1974) is a British installation artist. He creates sculptures, large artwork installations, and live arts projects.

== Artwork ==
Jerram's work has been featured in over 900 exhibitions and is in over 50 permanent collections, including at the Metropolitan Museum of Art in New York and the Wellcome Collection in London.

In 2002, he created Tide, an artwork consisting of acoustic sculptures demonstrating 'live' representation of how the moon's gravity affects the Earth, where gravitational information was translated into sound.

In 2004, he began creating a series of transparent and colourless large glass sculptures of viruses and other pathogens, titled Glass Microbiology, recreating viruses such as smallpox, HIV/AIDS, Ebola, hand, foot and mouth disease and swine influenza.

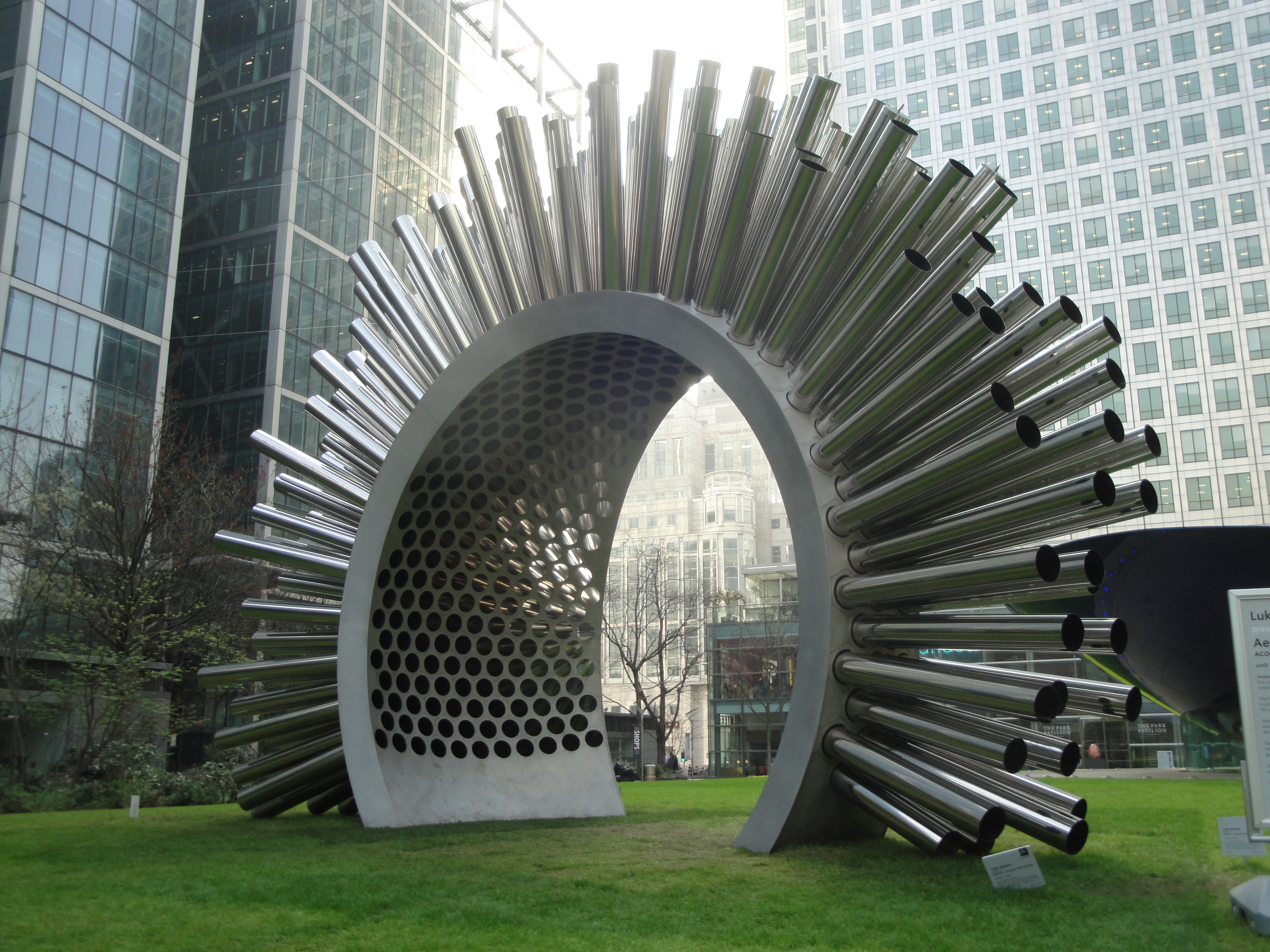
Aeolus acoustic wind pavilion at Canary Wharf, London in March 2012.

In 2012, he presented Aeolus, an acoustic wind pavilion at Canary Wharf in London. Named after the Aeolian harp, it was designed to create music without the need of human or electrical power.

In 2013, he created Maya, a sculpture of a girl created using 5,000+ photographs of his daughter, installed at platform three of Temple Meads railway station, which seemed fragmented until the viewer was far enough away for the image to be unpixellated.

In 2015, he created Withdrawn, which placed a fleet of stranded fishing boats strategically located around Leigh Woods National Nature Reserve. The artwork was supported by the National Trust and the Forestry Commission.

In 2019 he set up and funded both the Dreamtime Fellowship to support recent art graduates in his home city of Bristol and the Bristol Schools Arts Fund to support secondary schools impacted by austerity. In 2024 he set up the Jerram Foundation to help deliver some of these charitable projects.

In 2020 he was given an Honorary Doctorate from the University of Bristol, made an Honorary Academician of the RWA and Fellow of The Royal Astronomical Society.

His newest artwork, Helios, is seven metres across and named after a Greek god. Each centimetre of the enormous spherical sculpture, which is lit from inside, is said to represent 2,000 kilometres of the Sun’s surface.It fuses solar imagery, sunlight and a new composition by sound artist Duncan Speakman and musician Sarah Anderson which includes NASA recordings of the Sun.

== Personal life ==
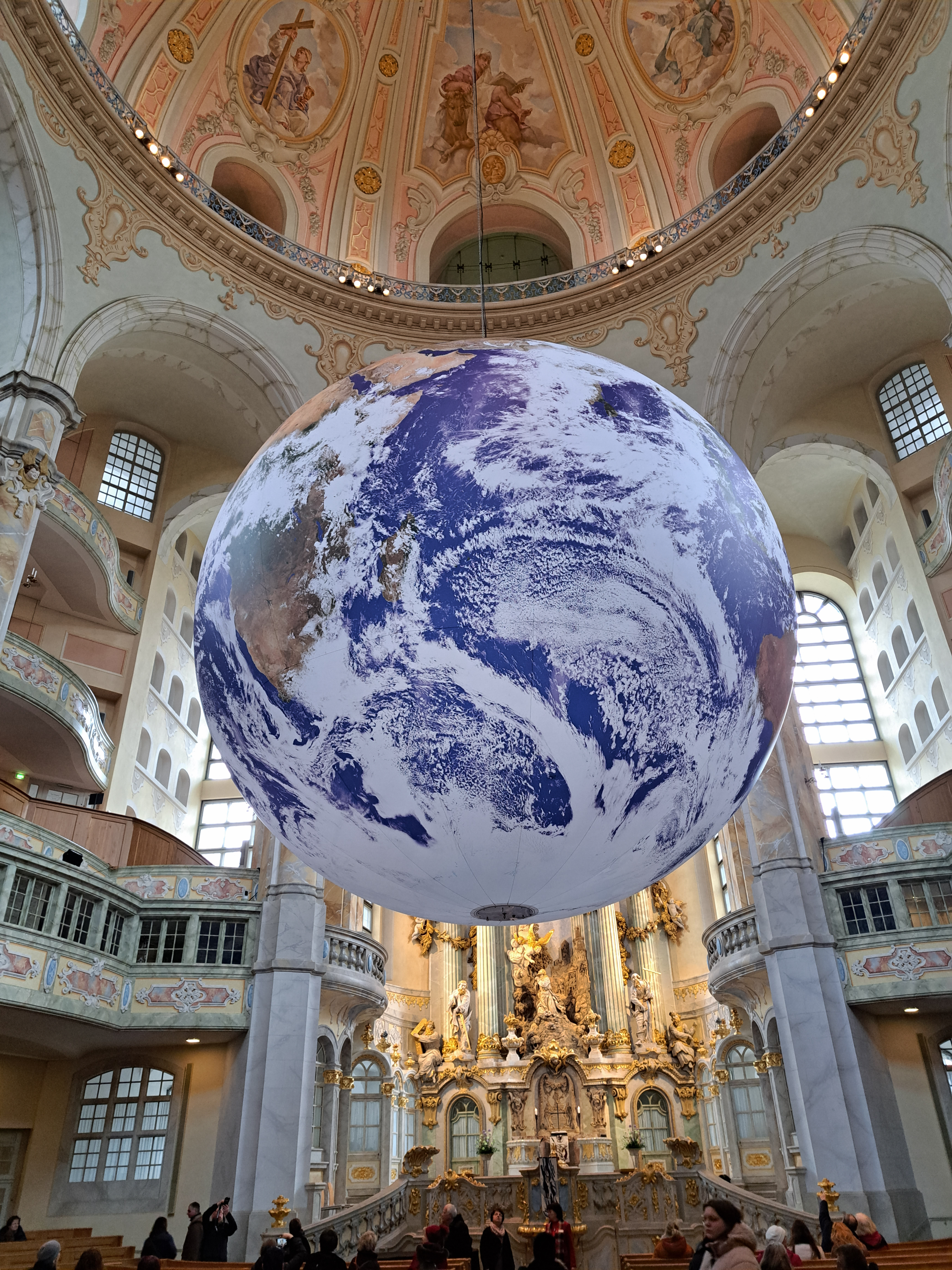
Gaia 7m Earth sculpture at Frauenkirche, Dresden.

He is a visiting fellow at the Faculty of Health and Applied Sciences, University of the West of England, Bristol.

Jerram has dichromatic colourblindness, which he views as a gift. He lives in Bristol, England with his wife and two children.

== Selected works ==
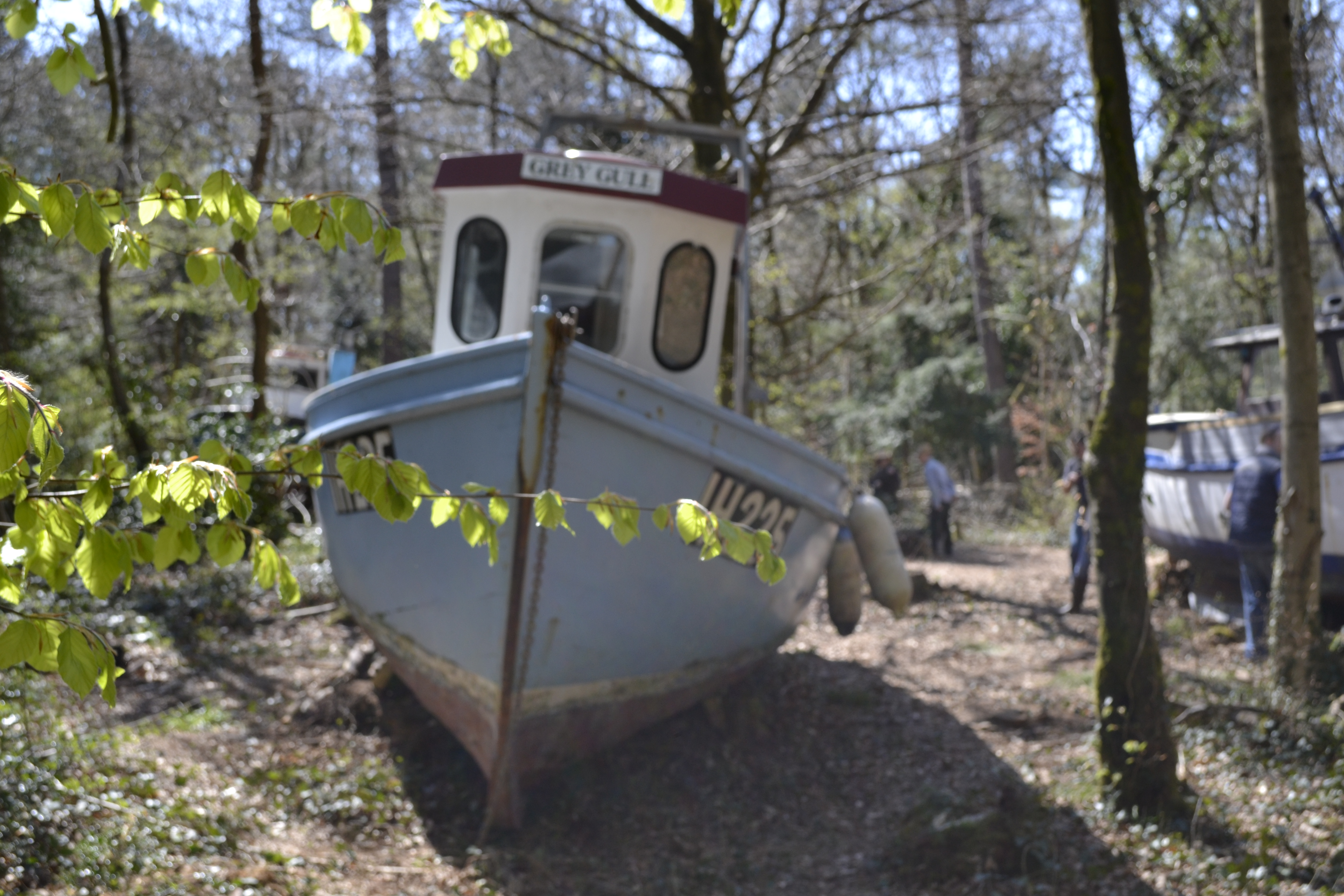
Withdrawn consisting of boats stranded high above Avon Gorge in Leigh Woods, 2015.

- Tide (2002): Acoustic sculptures demonstrating ‘live’ the impact of the moon's gravity.
- Glass Microbiology (2004): Glass sculptures of viruses and other pathogens.
- Dream Director (2007)
- Play Me, I'm Yours (2008)
- Sky Orchestra (2011)
- Aeolus (2012): An acoustic wind pavilion at Canary Wharf, London.
- Maya (2013): A sculpture of a girl created using 5,000+ photographs of his daughter.
- Park and Slide (2014)
- Withdrawn (2015): A fleet of stranded fishing boats located around Leigh Woods.
- Museum of the Moon (2016)
- Gaia (2018)
- Mars (2019)
- Palm Temple (2020)
- Of Earth and Sky (2020)
- In Memoriam (2020)
- Floating Earth (2021)
- Clothed with Protection (2022)
- Crossings (2022)
- First Breath (2023)
- Power of Light (2023)
- Ascension (2024)
- Tipping Point (2024)
- Fallen Moon (2024)
- Mirror Moon (2024)
- Helios (2025)

== Selected awards ==
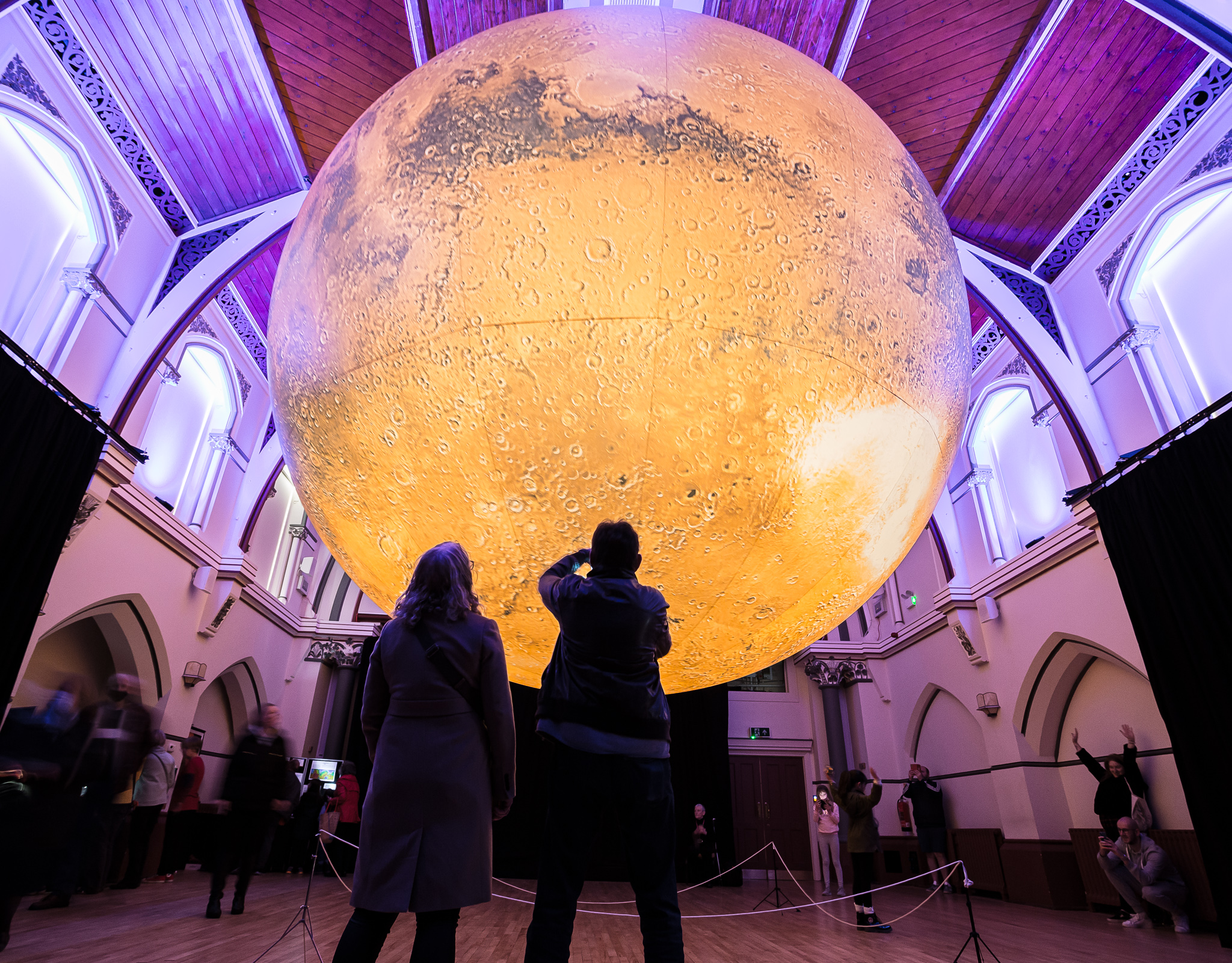
Mars at Dorchester Corn Exchange in 2022

- 1999 Da2 Digital Arts Development Agency
- 2001 ACE Arts Council Touring Grant for Tide
- 2002-2005 NESTA (National Endowment for Science Technology and Arts) Fellowship
- 2005-2006 AHRC Arts and Science Fellowship at UWE
- 2006 UK Clark Digital Arts Bursary, Watershed
- 2008 ACE Grants for the Arts Programme, Touring of the Dream Director
- 2009 EPSRC, PPE Grant with ISVR, Southampton University
- 2010 25th Rakow Award from the Corning Museum of Glass
- 2010 ACE Grants for the Arts Programme, Touring of Aeolus
- 2011 Fellowship at Museum of Glass, Washington
- 2013 Omaha Entertainment and Arts Awards. Play Me, I’m Yours ‘Best Public Art’
- 2017 Leverhulme Trust Artist in Residence Grant at University of Bristol, UK.
- 2018 Visiting Fellow Faculty of Health and Applied Sciences, University of West of England
- 2022 Hearts for the Arts Award, for Of Earth and Sky.
- 2024 Oxford University, ImmersiGenius Distinction Award.

== Bibliography ==
- Exhibitionism - The Art of Display. ISBN 978-0-9557950-1-5
- Science Magazine Vol 326, Issue 5951
- Medicine and Art. Mori Art Museum.
- Live Variola Virus. Book by AM Arvin, DM Patel, 2009 ISBN 0309136903
- Art in Mind, Book by Jerram published by the Watershed, Bristol, 2008. ISBN 978-0-9560356-0-8
- Bath Royal and Literary & Scientific Institution Vol10 ISSN 1465-8496
- The New Astronomy: Opening the Electromagnetic Window and Expanding Our View of Planet Earth. 2006 ISBN 978-1-4020-3723-8
- Acoustic Space 6 Waves, RIXC. Aug 2006,
- Dreams - Scientific Journal Nov 2006
- OLATS, April 2004
- Acoustic Space Art: Media Architecture, May 2002, ISBN 9984-9538-0-7
- "Luke Jerram of Earth and Sky book". Bristol Books CIC. ISBN 978-1909446458.
- "Luke Jerram: Art, Science & Play". Sansom & Company. 1 April 2019. ISBN 978-1-911408-48-2.
