= Rugbyclub Curtrycke =

Belgian rugby union club, based in Kortrijk

- Founded: 2000; 26 years ago
- Location: Rollegem, Belgium
- Coach: Fabrice Boogaerts
Team kit

Rugbyclub Curtrycke is a Belgian rugby club in the submunicipality of Rollegem in the city of Kortrijk.

== History ==
The club was founded in 2000.
