= K in Kortrijk =

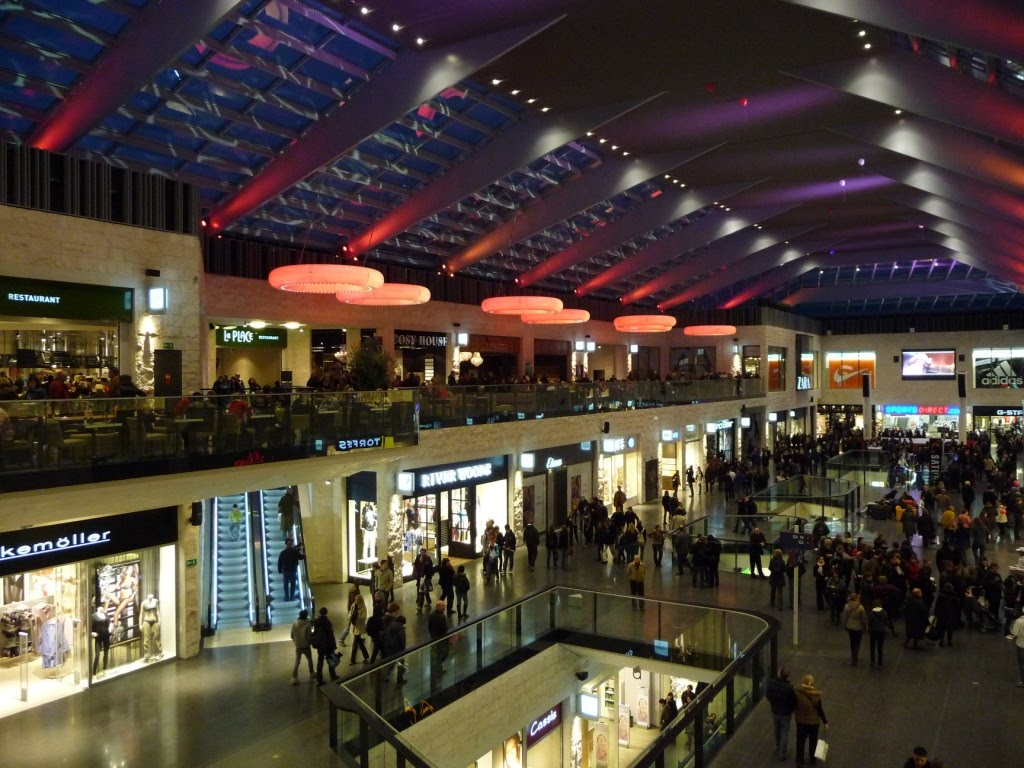
- The central square within K in Kortrijk
- Location: Kortrijk, Belgium
- Coordinates: 50°49′36″N 3°16′13″E
- Opened: 11 March 2010 9 am GMT
- Developer: Foruminvest
- Num. of stores: 90
- Floor area: 35,000 m^{2} (380,000 sq ft)
- Floors: 7
- Parking: 1,100
- Website: www.k-in-kortrijk.be

K in Kortrijk is a shopping centre in the Belgian city of Kortrijk. The centre, located downtown, was developed by Foruminvest at a cost of €200,000,000. The shopping mall comprises 35,000 m^{2} (380,000 sq ft) of shopping space, 90 shops and a tower with apartments. It is one of the biggest downtown shopping centres in Belgium. The mall opened 11 March 2010. It is currently owned by the German Union Investment Real Estate group.

== A downtown urban renewal project ==
The shopping centre and the 40 apartments were constructed on a site, situated in a downtown quarter, which formerly housed a primary school, a high school (Onze-Lieve-Vrouw van Bijstand), an elderly home and a convent.

In December 2009, the shopping centre was sold by Foruminvest to the German Union Investment Real Estate company.

== Construction ==
Construction works started in August 2007.

The opening of the shopping centre was scheduled to happen during the fall of 2009, but was later postponed to spring 2010.

== Pictures of the construction site (2007–2010) ==
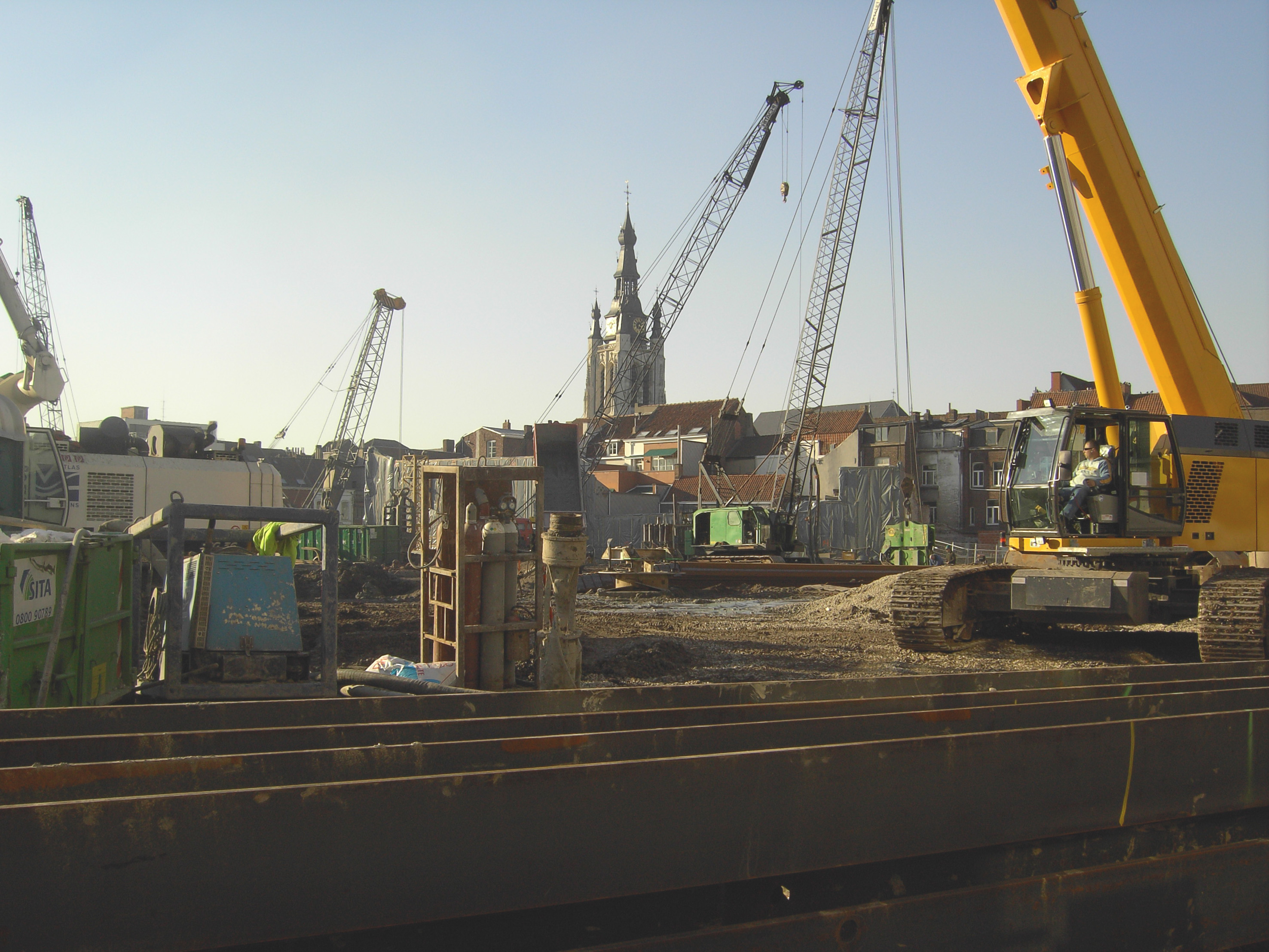
K in Kortrijk (January 2008).

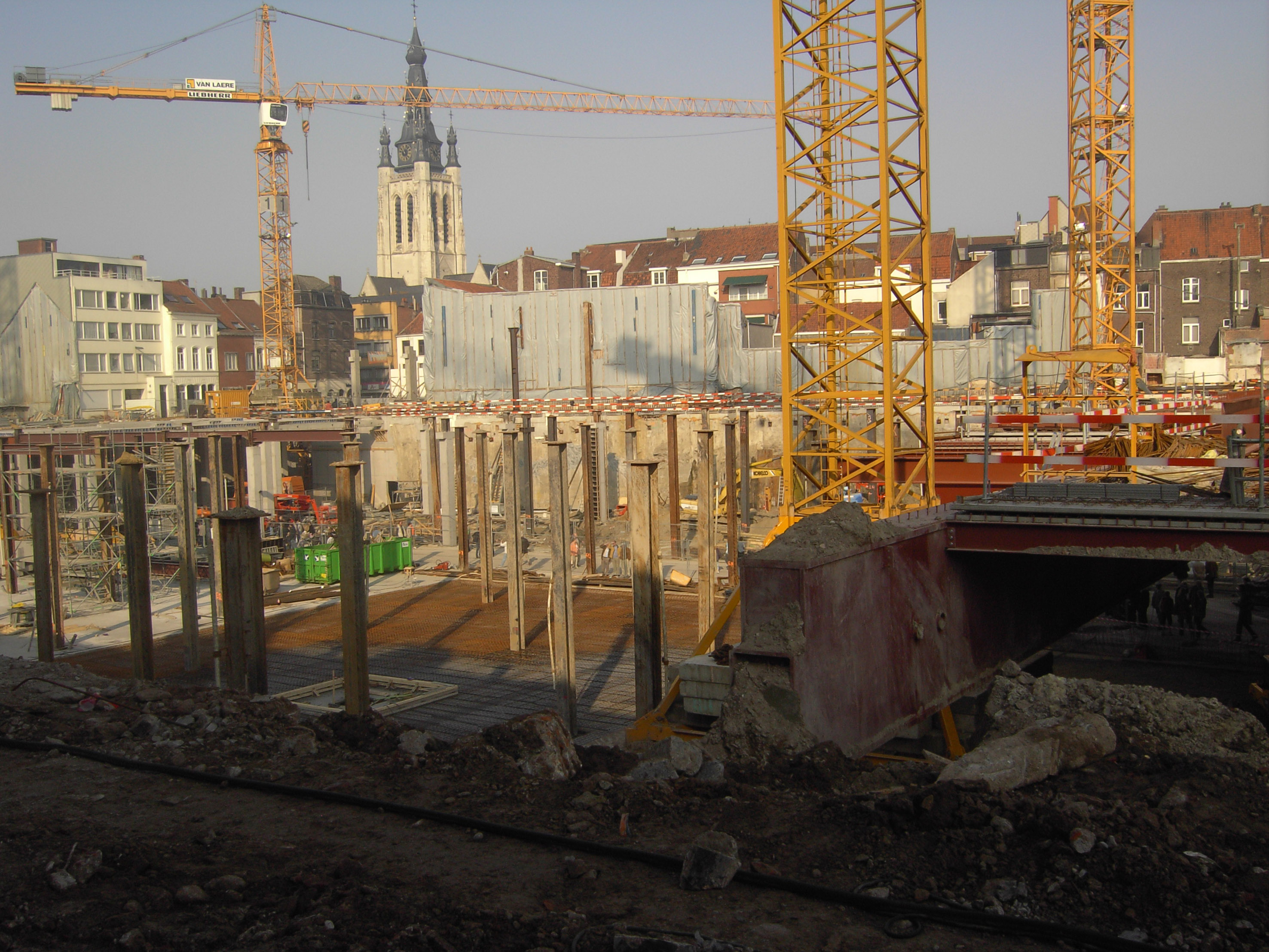
K in Kortrijk (September 2008).

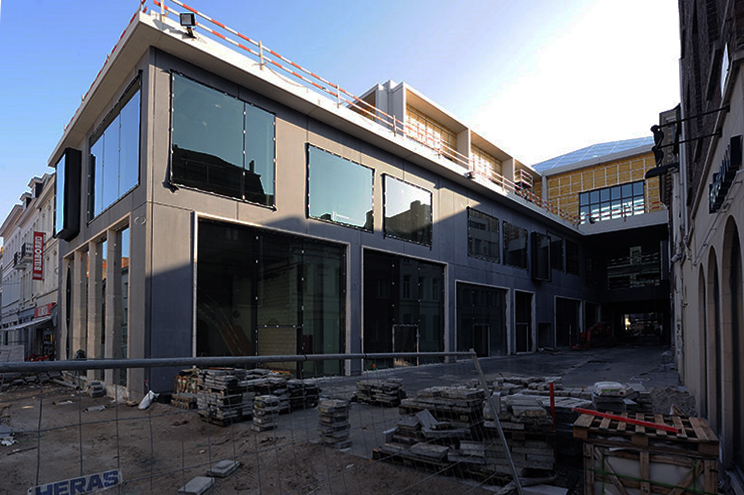
K in Kortrijk, Steenpoort entrance (November 2009).

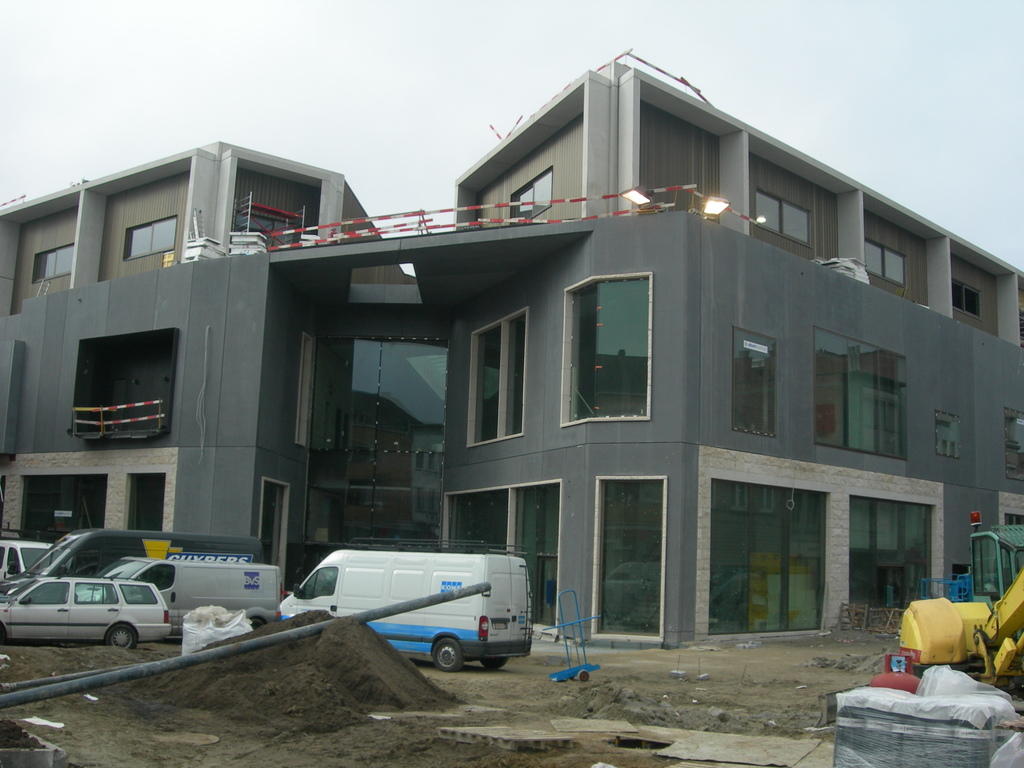
K in Kortrijk, Veemarkt entrance (January 2010).
