= Isidore De Loor =

Belgian professed religious

Blessed Isidore De Loor C.P.
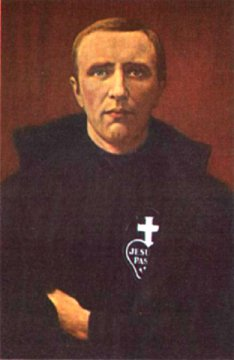
- De Loor in 1912
- Born: 18 April 1881; Vrasene, East Flanders, Belgium
- Died: 6 October 1916 (aged 35); Kortrijk, West Flanders, Belgium
- Venerated in: Roman Catholic Church
- Beatified: 30 September 1984, Saint Peter's Square, Vatican City by Pope John Paul II
- Feast: 6 October
- Attributes: Passionist habit
- Patronage: Cancer patients

Isidore De Loor (18 April 1881 – 6 October 1916), also known by his religious name Isidore of Saint Joseph, was a Belgian professed religious from the Passionists. He served in various capacities at the convents that he served like being a janitor or a cook for his fellow religious though his cancer never limited his work for others.

His beatification was held on 30 September 1984.

== Life ==
Isidore De Loor was born on 18 April 1881 in East Flanders in Belgium as the oldest of three children to Aloïs De Loor and Kamilla Hutsebaut. His parents were devout and had been married since 1879. He received his confirmation and his First Communion in 1894.

His education at the local school came to an end in 1893 and from then on he joined his father in working on their farm. He grew up to be a devout and hard-working individual and often thought of following a vocation to the religious life. He was present among the Redemptorist priests at a mission and there discussed the matter of his vocation with a priest who advised him to join the Passionists. On 15 April 1907 he set off for the Passionist convent at Ere. It was there that the French language was spoken and the Dutch-speaking De Loor found it quite difficult to navigate a path to the convent. He was reserved and kept to himself but soon put himself to work and he impressed his superiors with his strong will and strong determination. On 8 September 1907 he received the religious habit and also received the religious name of "Isidore of Saint Joseph". The novitiate followed this during which he became an example to his fellow novices who were impressed with his happiness and his charitable disposition. On 13 September 1908 he professed his solemn vows.

De Loor was transferred after his profession to the convent at Kortrijk on 11 August 1912 where he was put to work both as a gardener and as a cook. Despite suffering with a painful tumour that had a partial effect on his sight he was reluctant to complain about it; cancer was diagnosed and his right eye was removed in June 1911. The cancer had spread soon and he was given a short time left to live. He then served as porter of the convent not long thereafter in 1914. But as World War I took its toll on Belgium more and more visitors prevailed upon the convent for help and he was more than willing to offer his assistance. In late summer 1916 his health worsened and the cancer had spread to his intestines while that September it spread to his bowels. He asked the permission of his superior to die in peace and he died in the night from the violent pains of his cancer and pleurisy on 6 October 1916. He experienced his final pain in a chair with his face in his hands unable to bear the great pain. His remains were exhumed in 1952 and reinterred in his old convent where he had died.

== Beatification ==
De Loor's beatification process opened under Pope Pius XII on 15 March 1952, granting him the title of Servant of God. Pope John Paul II named him as Venerable on 12 July 1982 after confirming his life of model heroic virtue. The same pope beatified De Loor later on 30 September 1984.

The current postulator for this cause is the Passionist priest Giovanni Zubiani.
