= Kortrijk =

Municipality in Flemish Region, Belgium

Kortrijk: Kortryk / Kortrik (West Flemish); Courtrai (French)
- City and municipality
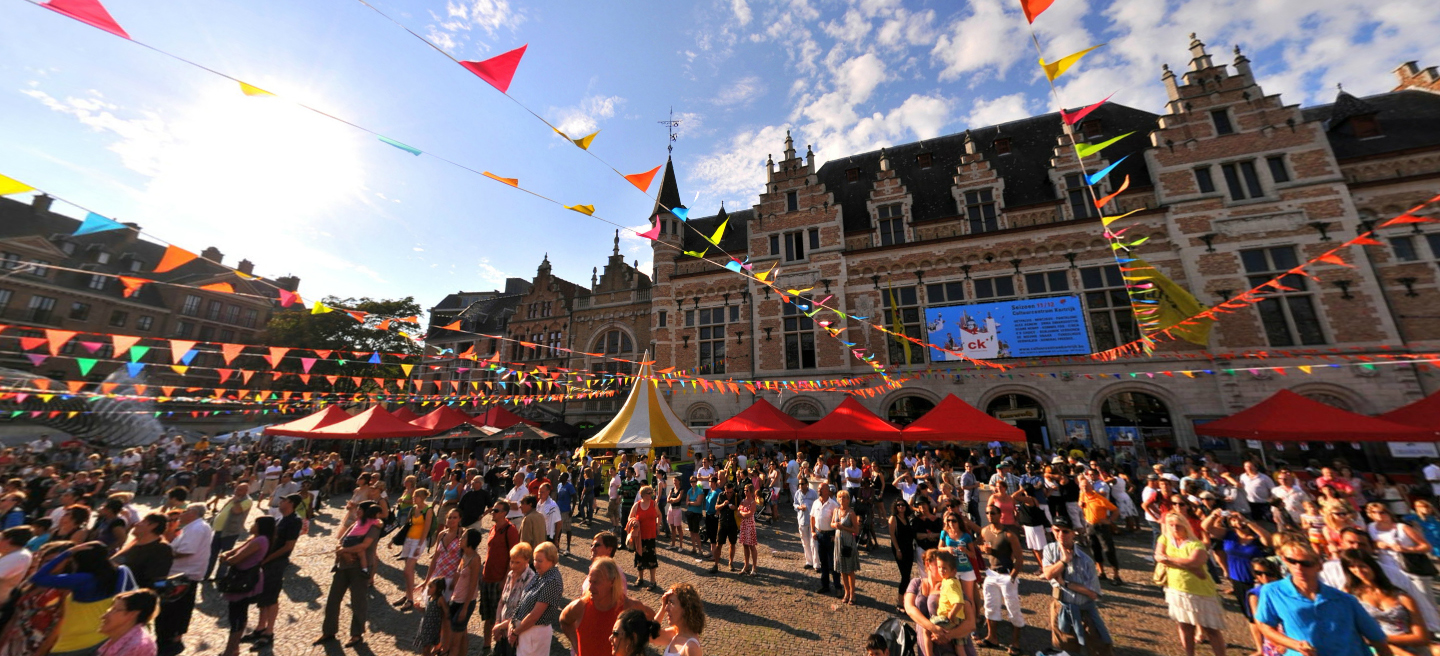
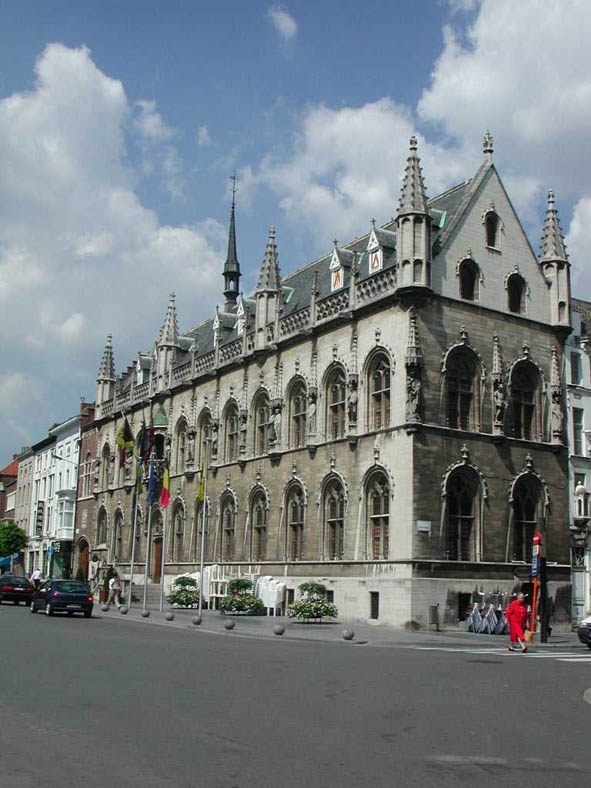
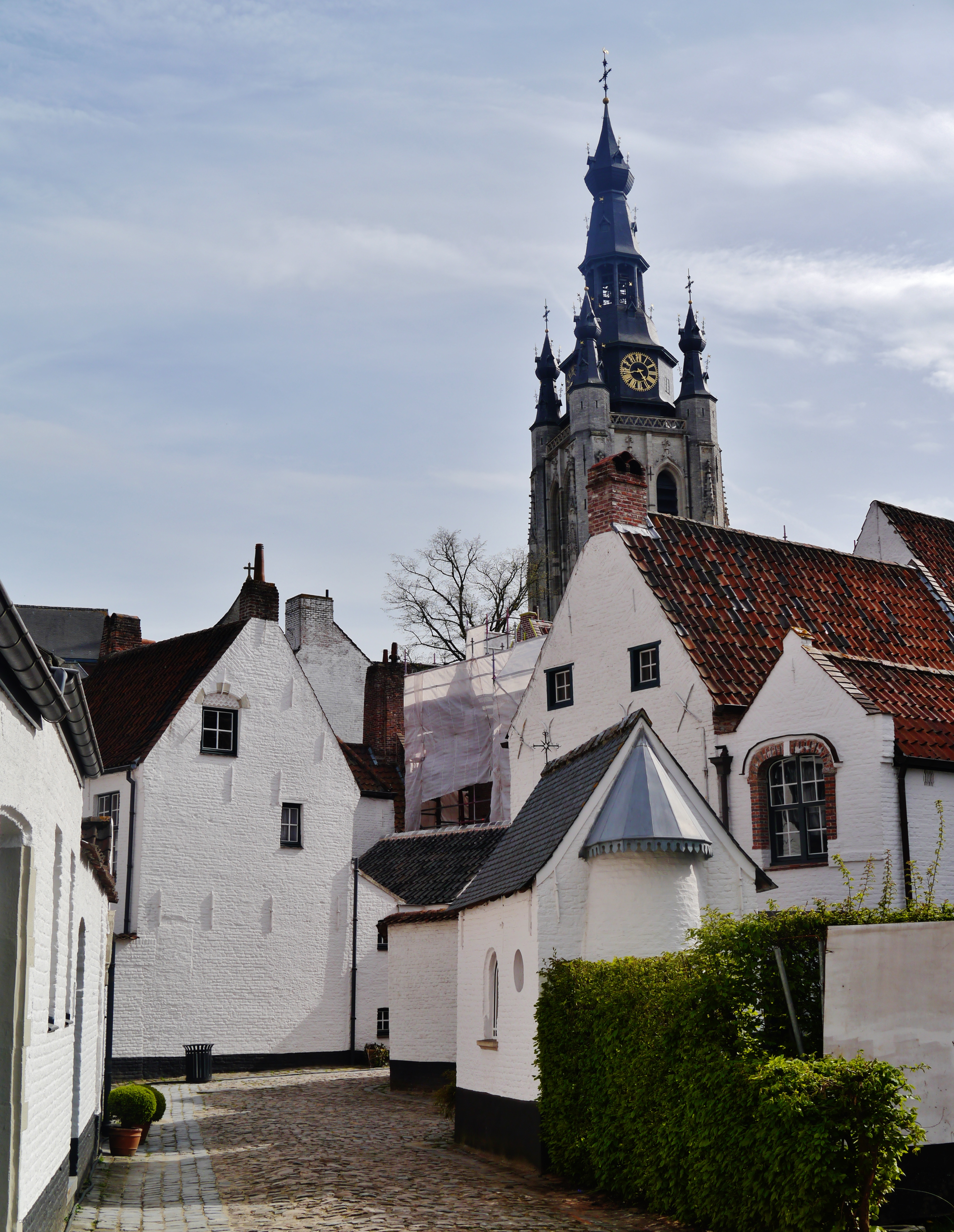
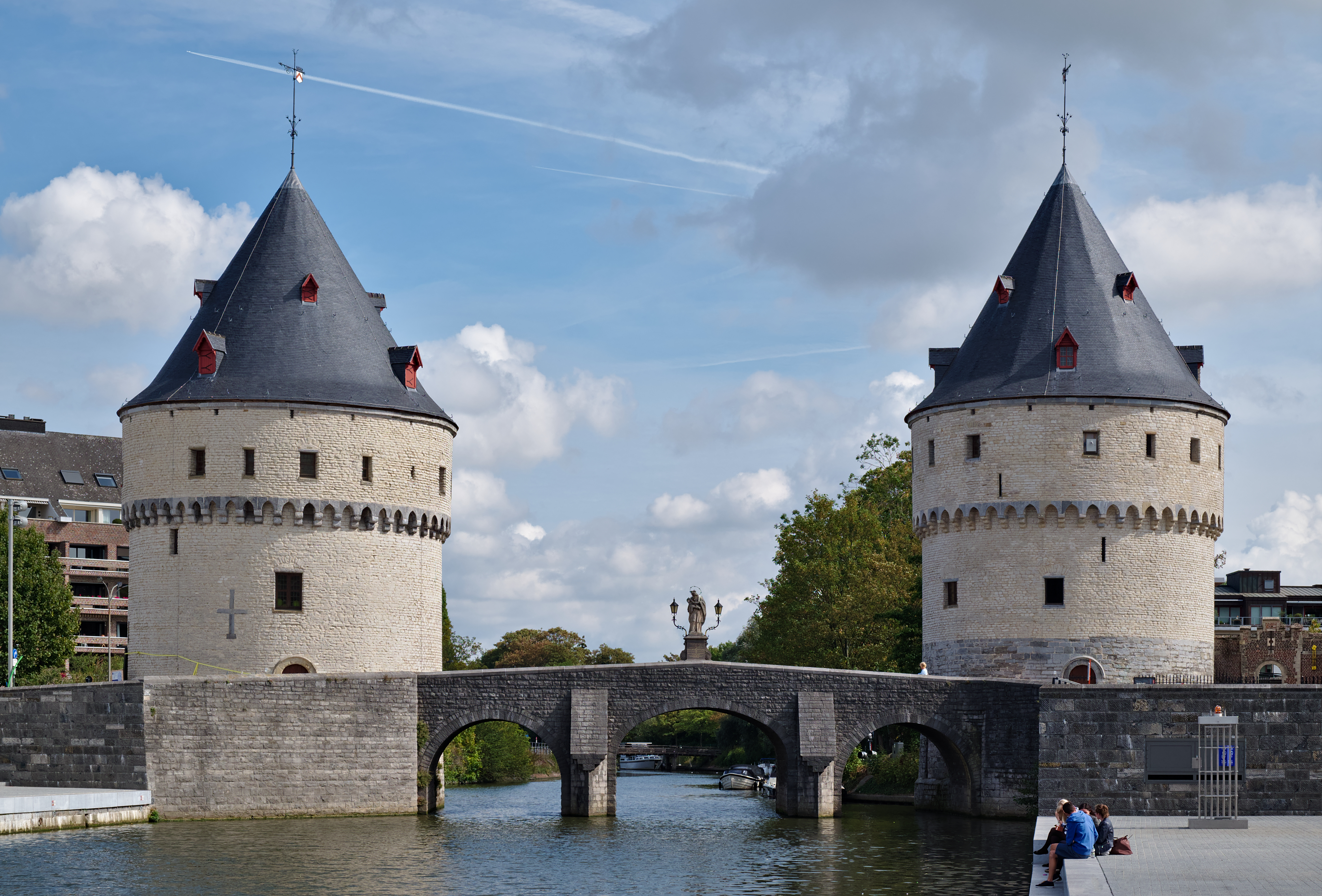
- Clockwise from top: Theatre Square (Schouwburgplein) during Summer Carnival, Beguinage and Saint Martin's Church, Broeltowers, Kortrijk City Hall as seen from the Grote Markt

- Flag Coat of arms

- Location of Kortrijk in West Flanders
- Interactive map of Kortrijk
- Location in Belgium
- Coordinates: 50°49′39″N 03°15′57″E
- Country: Belgium
- Community: Flemish Community
- Region: Flemish Region
- Province: West Flanders
- Arrondissement: Kortrijk

Government
  - Mayor: Vincent Van Quickenborne (Open VLD)
  - Governing parties: Team Burgemeester, Vooruit, N-VA

Area
  - Total: 80.69 km^{2} (31.15 sq mi)

Population (2022-01-01)
  - Total: 77,741
  - Density: 963.5/km^{2} (2,495/sq mi)
- Postal codes: 85xx (8500, 8501, 8510, 8511)
- NIS code: 34022
- Area codes: 056
- Website: www.kortrijk.be

Kortrijk (/ˈkɔːrtraɪk/ KORT-ryke, Dutch: [ˈkɔrtrɛik]; West Flemish: Kortryk or Kortrik; French: Courtrai [kuʁtʁɛ]), sometimes known in English as Courtrai or Courtray (/kʊərˈtreɪ/ koor-TRAY), is a Belgian city and municipality in the Flemish province of West Flanders.

With its 80,000 inhabitants (2024) Kortrijk is the capital and the most populous city of the judicial and administrative arrondissement of Kortrijk. The wider municipality comprises the city of Courtrai proper and the villages of Aalbeke, Bellegem, Bissegem, Heule, Kooigem, Marke, and Rollegem. Courtrai is also part of the cross-border Lille-Kortrijk-Tournai metropolitan area.

The city is on the river Leie, 42 km (26 mi) southwest of Ghent and 25 km (16 mi) northeast of Lille. Mouscron in Wallonia is just south of Courtrai.

Courtrai originated from a Gallo-Roman town, Cortoriacum, at a crossroads near the Leie river and two Roman roads. In the Middle Ages, Courtrai grew significantly thanks to the flax and wool industry with France and England and became one of the biggest and richest cities in Flanders. The city is known for the Battle of the Golden Spurs which took place on 11 July 1302 on the Fields of Groeninge in Courtrai. In 1820 the Treaty of Kortrijk was signed, laying out the still-current borders between France and Belgium. Throughout the 19th and 20th century, the flax industry flourished and remains important within the Belgian textile industry today.

Courtrai is the largest city in southern West Flanders, with several hospitals, colleges and a university. Courtrai was the first city in Belgium with a pedestrian shopping street, the Korte Steenstraat.

== History ==
=== Name ===
The Latin name Cortoriacum means the settlement near the curb in the river. There is also mention of 'Cortoracum' in some literature. Its name later evolved to 'Cortrycke', 'Cortryck' and 'Kortrijk' (19th century). In French and in English, the city is called Courtrai.

=== Origins Roman times ===
Findings from an archeological dig in 1950 in which remains of three Roman funeral pyres were found suggest that the vicus was used as an encampment by the Romans during their invasion of Britain in AD 43.

Cortoriacum was a larger Gallo-Roman vicus of civitas Menapiorum at an important crossroads near the Lys river of the Roman roads linking Tongeren and Cassel and Tournai and Oudenburg. It was first mentioned in a document from the 4th or 5th century called Notitia Dignitatum where the cortoriacenses (cavalry) troops were mentioned.

=== Middle ages ===
In the 9th century, Baldwin II, Count of Flanders established fortifications against the Vikings. The town gained its city charter in 1190 from Philip, Count of Flanders. The population growth required new defensive walls, part of which can still be seen today (the Broeltorens, Armory, Kortrijk). Several local places still refer to physical parts of the defensive structures around Kortrijk (Walle, Waterpoort, Menenpoort, Gentsepoort, Brugsepoort, Kasteelkaai); Most of the physical parts have been overbuilt or destroyed.

In the 13th century, the battles between Fernando of Portugal, Count of Flanders and his first cousin, King Louis VIII of France, led to the destruction of the city. The Counts of Flanders had it rebuilt soon after. To promote industry and weaving in the town, Joan, Countess of Flanders exempted settlers in Courtrai from property tax. From that time, Kortrijk gained great importance as a centre of linen production.

==== Battle of the Golden Spurs ====
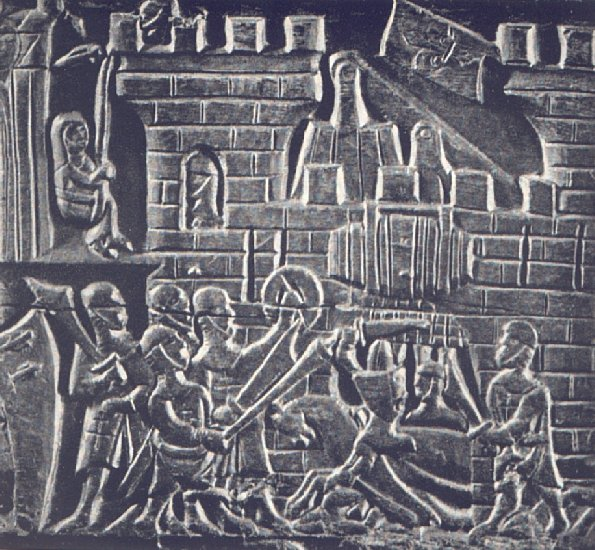
The castle of Courtrai during the 1302 siege and Battle of the Golden Spurs, as depicted on the Courtrai Chest

After the annexation of the County of Flanders in 1300 during the Franco-Flemish War, King Philip IV of France ordered a castle to be built in Courtrai for a French garrison. The king made a Joyous entry in Lille, Tournai, Courtrai, Ghent, Brugge and Ieper between 13 May and 14 June 1301, to confirm his authority over the county of Flanders. He visited Courtrai on 19 May. At Bruges the visit left a bitter taste, as the heavy cost of the royal visit was paid by a new tax. The harsh reaction of the French governor Jacques de Chatillon to the social unrest caused by the heavy taxes eventually escalated into open rebellion. When he entered the town on 17 May 1302 with a small army, the town militia massacred these troops in the morning of 18 May in the Bruges Matins. De Châtillon escaped with the remainder of his troops to the castle of Courtrai. Flemish militia troops under the command of Guy of Namur laid siege to the castle on 23 June. From the castle, burning arrows set many buildings afire in the city. When the royal army assembled at Lens on 30 June under the command of Count Robert II of Artois, all Flemish militia troops were concentrated at Courtrai. The French troops arrived on 8 July. The next two days these troops stormed the Tournai gate and the Lille gate but could not breach the city defense. On 11 July Robert decided to give battle in the open field. The ensuing Battle of the Golden Spurs (Dutch: Guldensporenslag) resulted in an unexpected victory for Flanders; the date is commemorated as a national holiday by the Flemish community.

=== Bourgundian to modern times ===
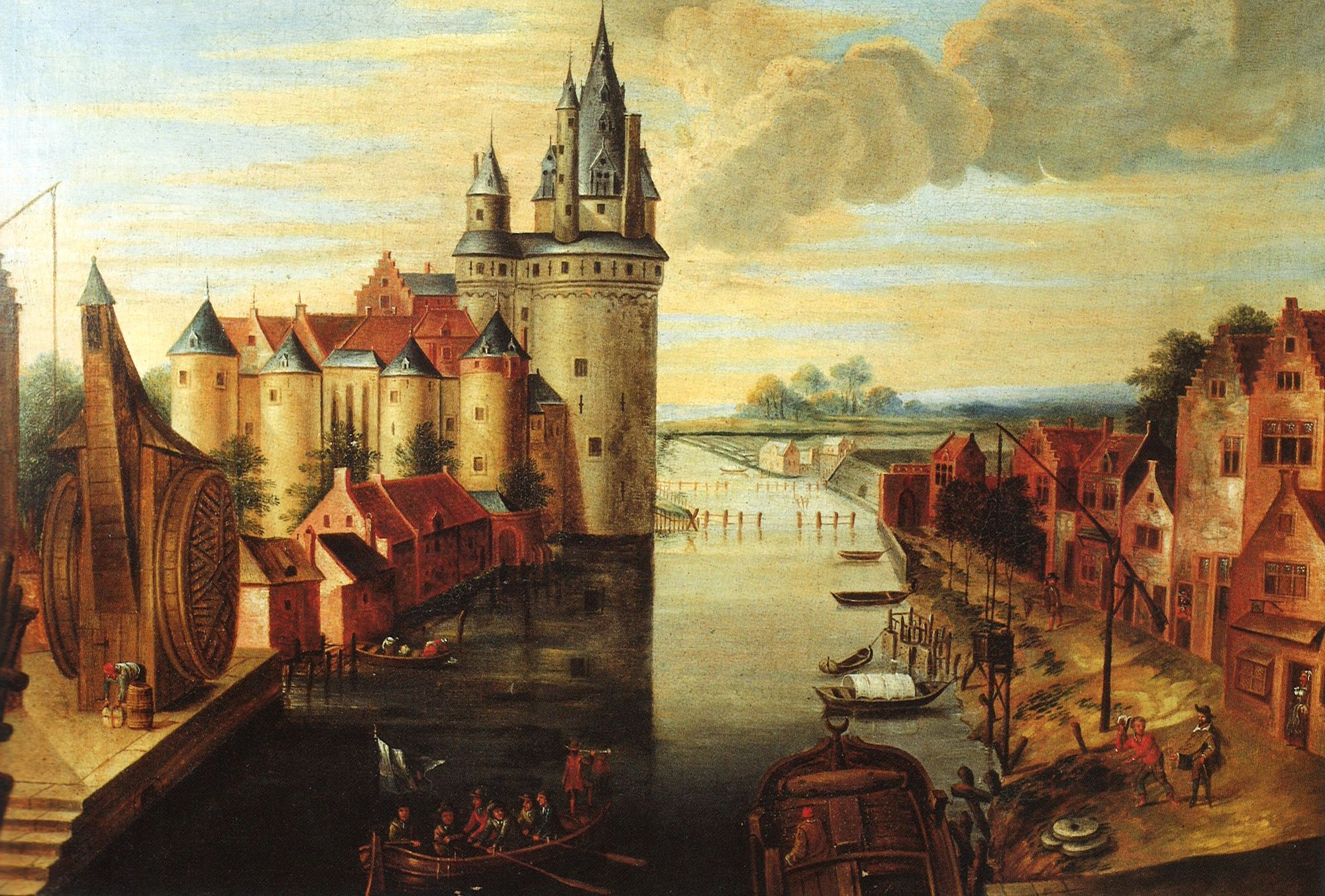
The Bourgundian castle of Kortrijk, built after the destruction of the town in 1382. It was completed by 1394 and demolished in 1684.

Most of the 15th century was prosperous under the Dukes of Burgundy, until the death of the Burgundian heiress Mary of Burgundy in 1482, which ushered in renewed fighting with France.

The 16th century was marked by the confrontations engendered by the Reformation and the uprising of the Netherlands against Spain.

Louis XIV's reign saw Courtrai occupied by the French five times in sixty years and its former fortifications razed. The Treaty of Utrecht assigned the area to the Austrian Habsburgs.

After the French Revolution and the Napoleonic era, the textile industry, based on flax, and the general economy of the city prospered again. The city had a population of 18,000 inhabitants by the 1840s.

Courtrai was heavily bombed in the summer of 1917, but was liberated by the British Army the following year. During World War II the city was an important railway hub for the German army, and for this reason was the target of several Allied airstrikes. On 21 July 1944 (the Belgian National Day) around 300 Avro Lancasters dropped over 5,000 bombs on the city centre. Many historical buildings on the central square, as well as the old railway station, were destroyed.

=== Battle of Courtrai ===
Battles fought there in 1302, 1382, 1580, 1793, 1794, 1814, 1815, and 1918 have each been called Battle of Courtrai.

== Geography ==
Municipalities

After the 1977 fusion the city is made up of:
- I Kortrijk
- II Heule
- III Bissegem
- IV Marke
- V Aalbeke
- VI Rollegem
- VII Bellegem
- VIII Kooigem
The metropolitan area, including the outer commuter zone, also consists of Kuurne, Wevelgem, Zwevegem and Harelbeke. Although these municipalities have strong morphologic ties with Courtrai, they aren't officially part of the city.
- a. Kuurne (municipality Kuurne)
- b. Harelbeke (municipality Harelbeke)
- c. Zwevegem (municipality Zwevegem)
- d. Sint-Denijs (municipality Zwevegem)
- e. Spiere (municipality Spiere-Helkijn)
- f. Dottenijs (city of Moeskroen)
- g. Luingne (city of Moeskroen)
- h. Moeskroen (city of Moeskroen)
- i. Rekkem (city of Menen)
- j. Lauwe (city of Menen)
- k. Wevelgem (municipality Wevelgem)
- l. Gullegem (municipality Wevelgem)
- m. Sint-Eloois-Winkel (municipality Ledegem)
- n. Lendelede, with Sint-Katharina (municipality Lendelede)

=== Climate ===
Kortrijk has an oceanic climate (Köppen Cfb).

Climate data for Kortrijk (1981–2010 normals, sunshine 1984–2013)
Month	Jan	Feb	Mar	Apr	May	Jun	Jul	Aug	Sep	Oct	Nov	Dec	Year
Mean daily maximum °C (°F)	6.0 (42.8)	6.9 (44.4)	10.7 (51.3)	14.3 (57.7)	18.1 (64.6)	20.7 (69.3)	23.2 (73.8)	23.1 (73.6)	19.6 (67.3)	15.2 (59.4)	9.9 (49.8)	6.4 (43.5)	14.6 (58.3)
Daily mean °C (°F)	3.5 (38.3)	3.8 (38.8)	6.7 (44.1)	9.4 (48.9)	13.2 (55.8)	16.0 (60.8)	18.2 (64.8)	18.1 (64.6)	14.9 (58.8)	11.2 (52.2)	7.0 (44.6)	4.0 (39.2)	10.5 (50.9)
Mean daily minimum °C (°F)	0.8 (33.4)	0.6 (33.1)	2.8 (37.0)	4.5 (40.1)	8.5 (47.3)	11.4 (52.5)	13.5 (56.3)	13.0 (55.4)	10.3 (50.5)	7.3 (45.1)	4.0 (39.2)	1.6 (34.9)	6.6 (43.9)
Average precipitation mm (inches)	70.2 (2.76)	54.9 (2.16)	63.6 (2.50)	50.5 (1.99)	63.7 (2.51)	71.9 (2.83)	76.3 (3.00)	71.3 (2.81)	68.4 (2.69)	77.1 (3.04)	81.1 (3.19)	80.1 (3.15)	829.2 (32.65)
Average precipitation days	12.7	10.6	12.3	9.9	11.1	10.1	10.1	9.5	10.7	11.9	13.3	13.0	135.3
Mean monthly sunshine hours	59	79	122	177	205	200	214	202	149	119	65	49	1,639
Source: Royal Meteorological Institute

== Main sights ==
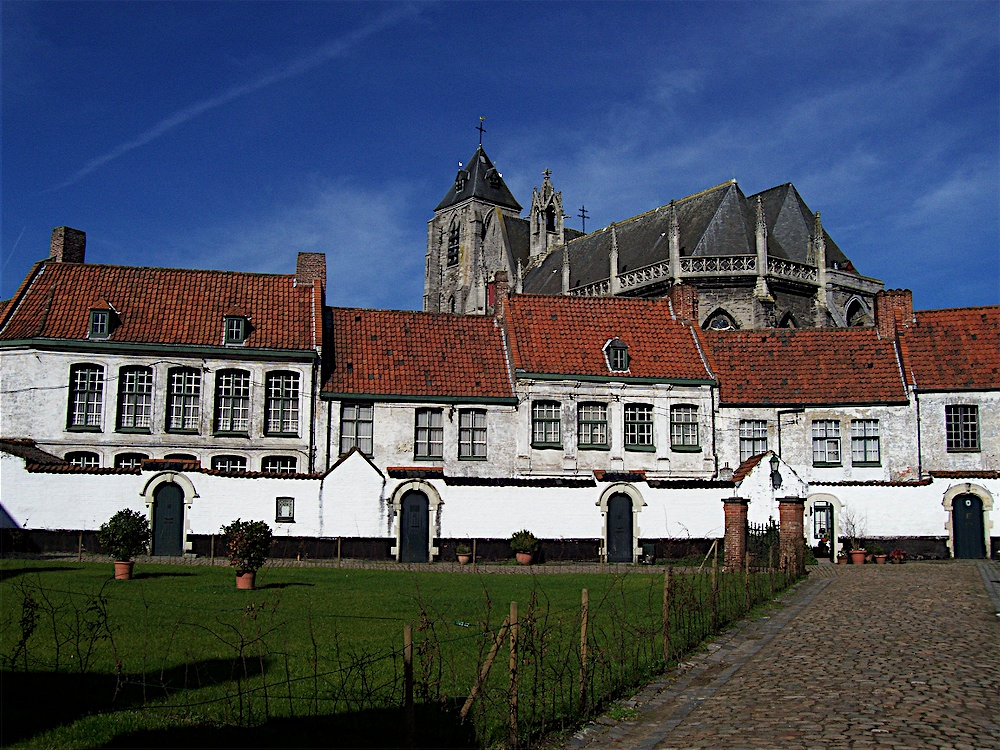
Old streets in the Béguinage.

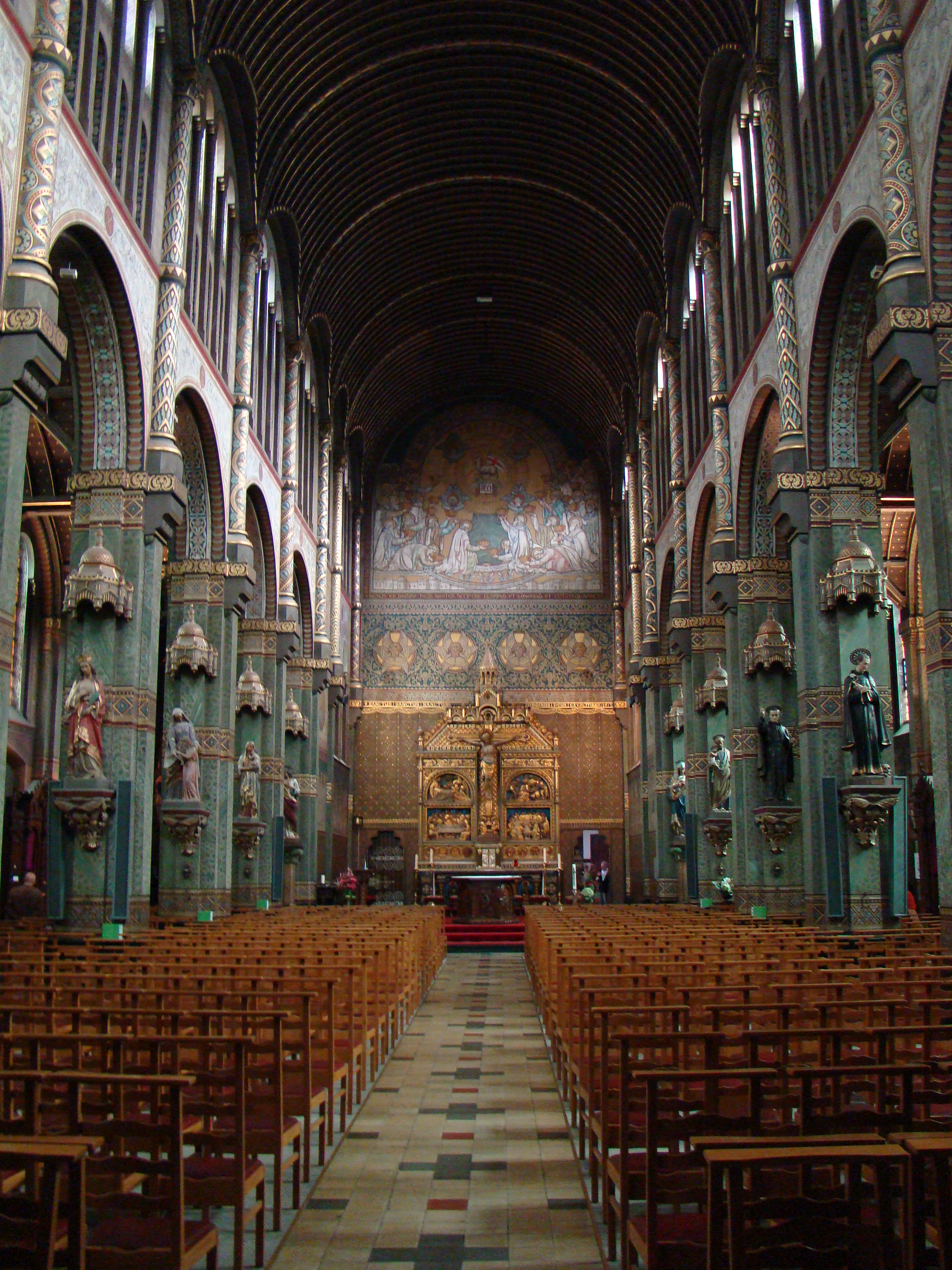
Interior of the Saint-Anthony church

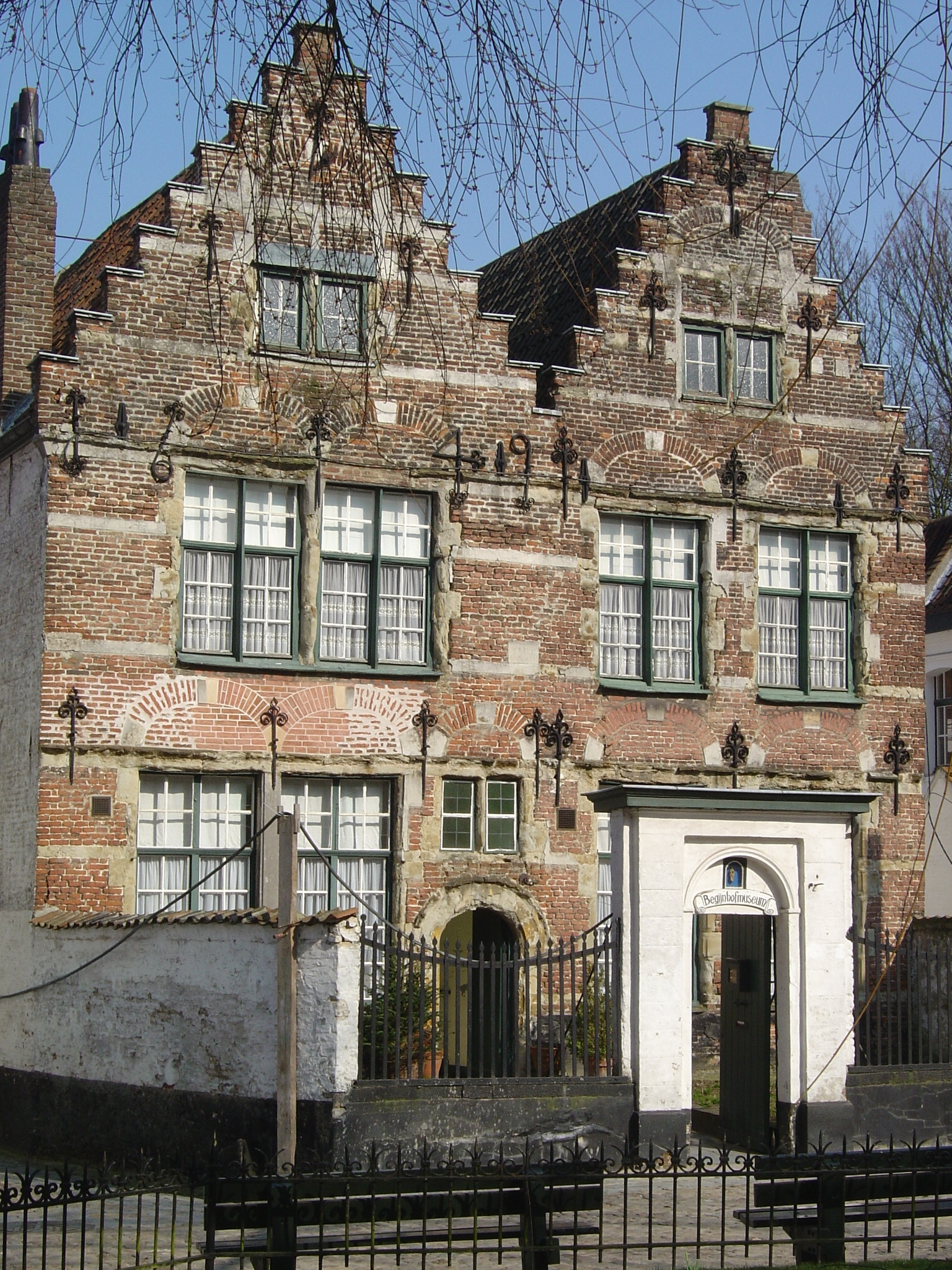
Medieval houses at the Begijnhof

=== Architecture ===
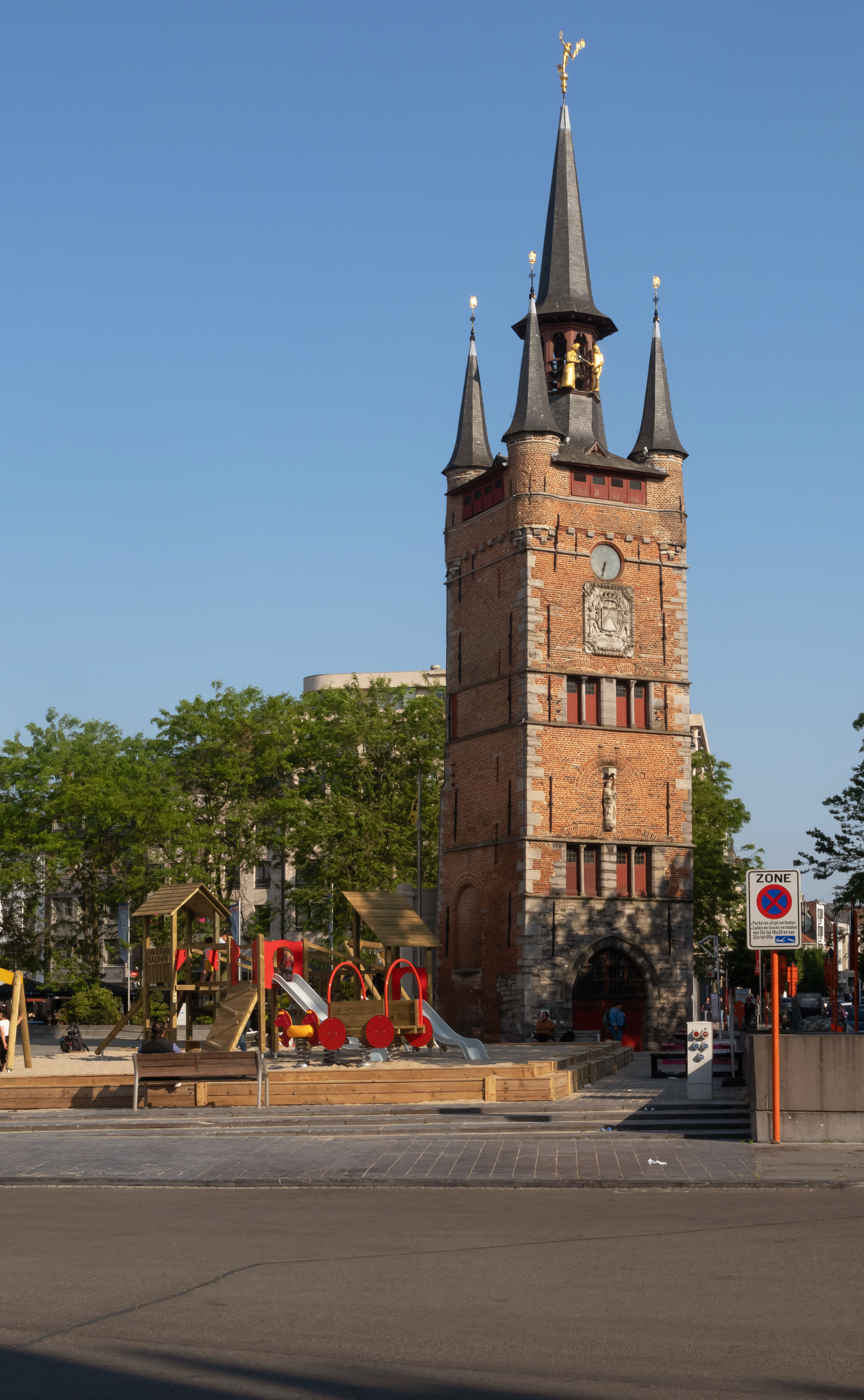
Belfry of Kortrijk, a UNESCO World Heritage Site

Much of the city's medieval architecture remains intact and is remarkably well preserved and restored. The city centre is one of the largest car-free areas in Belgium. The béguinage, as well as the belfry, have each been recognized by UNESCO as World Heritage Sites. The city was also recognized as a "Design City" by UNESCO in 2017. Interesting highlights are:

==== Civil ====
- Medieval Kortrijk City Hall on the main square, the Grote Markt. The façade of the late-Gothic, early Renaissance city hall is adorned with the statues of the Counts of Flanders.
- The belfry is surmounted by a statue of Mercury, god of the merchants. The belfry is classified by UNESCO as a World Heritage Site, on the list of Belfries of Belgium and France.
- Near-identical medieval Broel Towers with the bridge in between that spans the river Leie. (the Speyetower and the Ingelburgtower)
- Artillerytower (Artillerietoren)
- Mont de Piété (Berg van Barmhartigheid or house of Mercy)
- Weigh house (Stadswaag) on the St.Michael-square
- Our Lady Hospital (Onze-Lieve-Vrouwehospitaal), founded in 1200–1204.
- Baggaertshof, often called Kortrijk's second Beguinage, contains a Botanical garden
- Groeningekouter contains the Groeningegate and the Groeninge Monument, to commemorate the 600th anniversary of the famous Battle of the Golden Spurs

==== Religious ====
- The Saint-Martin church dates from the 13th century but was mostly rebuilt after a fire in the 15th century. It now houses a 48-bell carillon. Its 83-meter (272 feet) tower remains the highest building in the city.
- The beguinage is one of the quaintest sites in the city. It too, was listed by UNESCO as a World Heritage Site, on the list of "Flemish Béguinages".
- The church of Our Lady (Onze-Lieve-Vrouwekerk) is former collegiate church. Here the golden spurs taken from the battlefield in 1302 were hung. It houses a rich interior with an altar piece of van Dyck.
- the Count’s chapel (Gravenkapel), built after the example of la Sainte Chapelle in Paris as shrine for Louis II of Flanders.
- Saint-Michaelschurch; a church of the Society of Jesus
- Saint-Johnschurch in the St.-Johnsquarter; a Neo-Gothic basilica
- Groeninge Abbey
- Saint Eligiuschurch
- Saint-Pius X-church
- Saint-Rochchurch
- Saint-Elisabethchurch
- Saint-Anthonychurch or Toontjes kerk with the pilgrimage of Isidore of Saint Joseph
- Saint-Annechurch
- Saint-Theresiachurch
- Father Damienchurch

=== Museums ===
Museums in Courtrai include:

- Kortrijk 1302: seven centuries in one day, a historic museum about the famous Battle of the Golden Spurs, which gave Flanders its official holiday (11 July)
- Broelmuseum (Museum of Fine Arts and archaeological museum), with paintings by Roelant Savery and international Ceramic.
- National Flax Museum in honour of the plant that once was the main driver of Kortrijk’s economy. This museum will be relocated.
- Groeninge Abbey with the Groeningemuseum. This museum gives you an overview of Kortrijk's history.
- Beguinage museum located in the old town, in the béguinage.
- Flemish Film museum and archive
- Bakery- and Millmuseum, located in an old windmill.
- Museum of Agriculture
- International Rose gardens, located in the park of the Castle t Hooghe, in the Hoog-Kortrijk quarter just in front of Kortrijk Xpo.
- Begijnhofmuseum

== Transport ==
=== Road ===
Courtrai lies at the intersection of three highways:

- The E17: connects Courtrai with Ghent, Sint-Niklaas and Antwerp to the northeast, and with Lille and Paris to the south-west.
- The E403: connects Courtrai with Bruges and Ostend to the north, and with Tournai, Mons and Charleroi to the south-east.
- The Belgian highway A19: connects Courtrai with Ypres and the Belgian coast.
- In addition Courtrai also has two ringways:
  - The R8: connects the outskirts of Kortrijk with each other and the surrounding villages, and also leads to the A19, E403 and E17 roads.
  - The R36: connects the different downtown quarters with each other, and provides access to the main avenues.

=== Railway ===
The municipality of Courtrai has two railway stations:

- Kortrijk main railway station: an international railway station with direct connections to Antwerp, Brugge (Bruges), Brussels, Ghent, Leuven, Poperinge, Ieper (Ypres), Oudenaarde, other Belgian towns and Lille in France. The station also offers a direct connection to Brussels Airport.
- Bissegem Station: a regional railway station in the village of Bissegem with connections to Ypres.

=== Public city transport ===
Kortrijk has an extensive web of public transport lines, operated by De Lijn, providing access to the city centre and the suburbs (city lines, Dutch: stadslijnen) and to many towns and villages in the region around the city (regional lines, Dutch: streeklijnen). At Kortrijk main railway station, there is a bus station where regional buses stop as well.

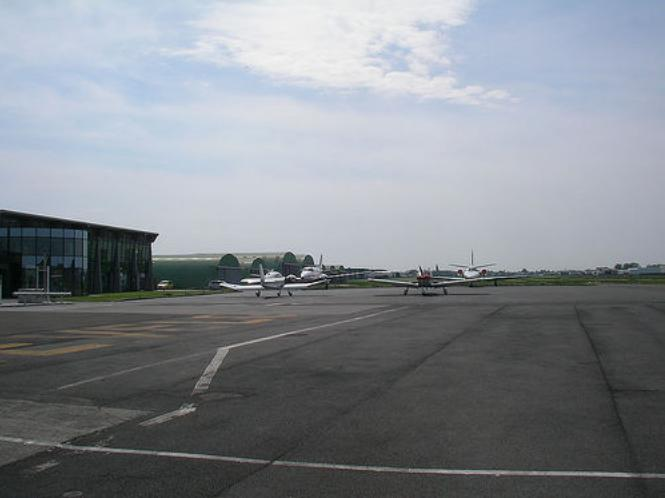
Kortrijk Airport.

=== Airport ===
The city has an airport known as Kortrijk-Wevelgem International Airport, which is mainly used for business travel and medical flights. Kortrijk Airport is located northwest of the city centre, next to the R8 ringroad.

=== Waterways ===
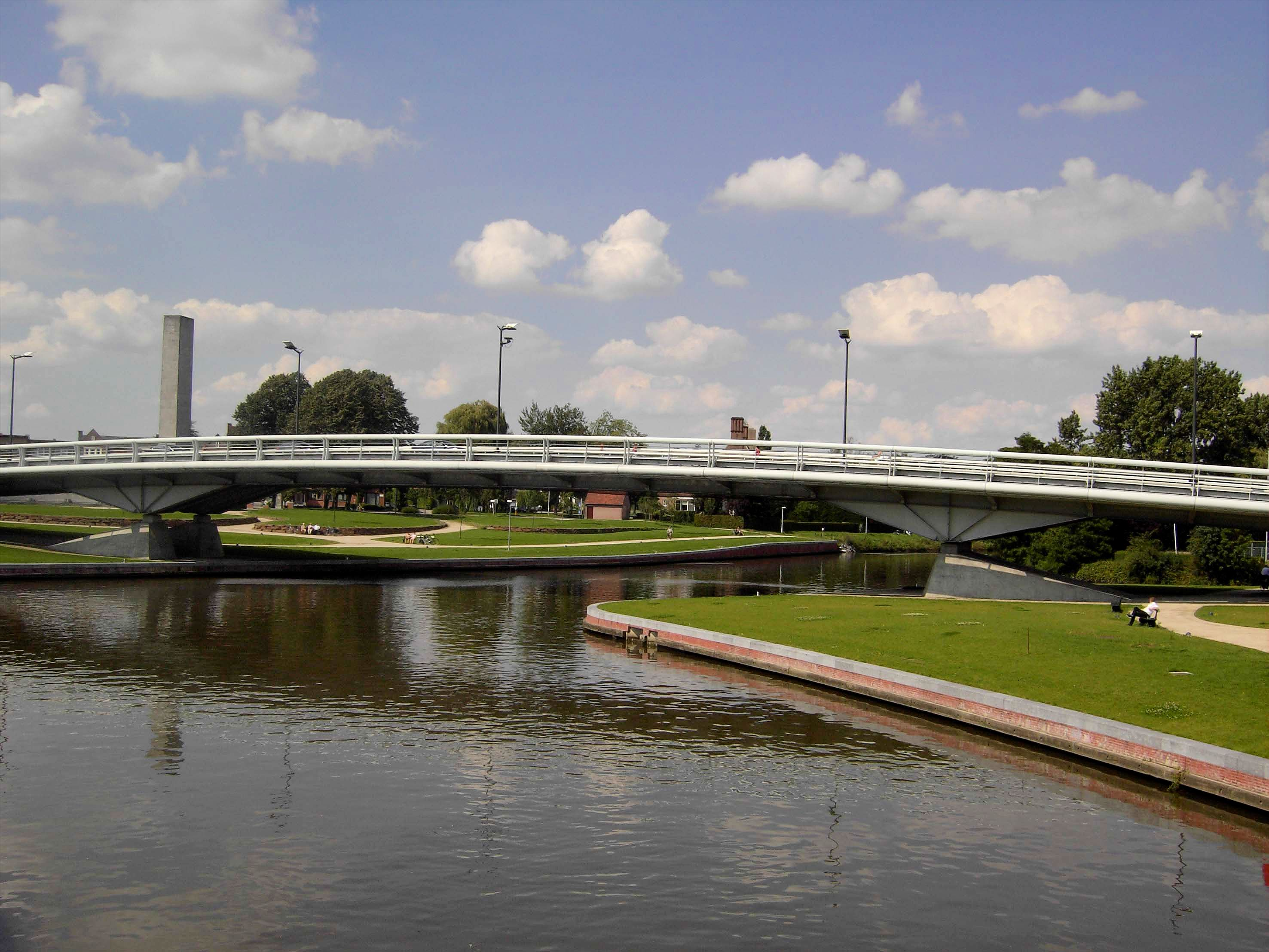
New Groeningebridge and Albertpark.

The river Lys (Leie) is an important way of transporting goods through inland navigation. The Bossuit-Kortrijk Canal enables in the city centre a direct connection with the river Scheldt.

Within the City, the river briefly splits in two, to re-join about a mile further.

- Oude Leie (Old Lys) original southernmost riverbed where the Broel towers still stand.
- Nieuwe Leie (New Lys) New bed that was dug around 1585 to accommodate water powered equipment.

From the 1970s on, the planning and later the execution of the so-called Leiewerken (Leieworks) started. These construction works comprised the deepening and widening of the river. This would enable ships with 4400 tons to navigate from France to the Scheldt. At the same time, this project included a thorough urban renewal of the riversides in the city. Seven new bridges were to give a new architectural impulse to the river quarters as well as the construction of several new parks along the river.

The following bridges were built during the period of 1997 and 2012:

- Dambrug
- Groeningebrug near the AlbertPark
- Ronde van Vlaanderenbrug near the new Nelson Mandelapark
- Collegebrug referring to the St Amands college
- Noordbrug (2010)
- Budabrug
- Reepbrug

More recently (2018), the banks in front of the Broel Towers were lowered to allow the public to enjoy the historic river banks along both sides of the River Lys (Leie). This area is now known as the Leieboorden (or Banks of the River Lys), a place for pedestrians with bars and restaurants.

==== Other smaller waterways ====
Several small streams or Beken in and around Courtrai were of significant topological, historical and Geological value.

- Lange Mere Mentioned in the Town accounts of 1412-13 as Langhe Meere.
- Mosscher (High Mossher and Low Mosscher) ending in the Southern Moat (Sanderus Map mentions only the Mosscher as a single toponym. It was also mentioned in almost full length on the Deventer Map.
- Groeninghe (first mentioned as Groeninc in 1412 ) Its name came from the green color of the flooded meadow where it originated.
- Grote Vijver (first mention as Hoghen vivere in the town accounts of 1416-17).
- St-Jan's stream - Human dug connecting stream
- Klakkaert stream
- Moat around the City (south of the Leie or Lys)
- Neveldries
- Bloedmeers

=== Cycling and pedestrian areas ===
Cars are required to give way to pedestrians and cyclists. In general, cars are led to large underground car parks in the historic centre of Courtrai or Park&Ride parking outside the town centre. Large parts of the historic centre are car free.

== Economy ==
The city is historically connected with the flax and the textile industry, and still today the textile industry remains important in the region. Major companies which have headquarters in Courtrai include Cisco and Barco.

== Education ==
Courtrai serves as an educational centre in south West Flanders, attracting students from the entire region.

There are 55 schools in Courtrai, on 72 different locations throughout the city, with an estimated 21,000 students.

The city also provides higher education. The KULAK, a campus of the Catholic University of Leuven, is located in on the south edge of the city, in the Hoog Kortrijk quarter. Other institutes of higher education include the VIVES University of Applied Sciences and Hogeschool West-Vlaanderen (HOWEST) university colleges. There is also a campus of Ghent University.

== European cooperation ==
Even though Courtrai is a Dutch-speaking town, it borders Wallonia, and is only 9 km (5.6 mi) away from the border with France. This has created an urban area that extends across linguistic and national borders. The mayors of Lille, Courtrai and Tournai met in Courtrai on 28 January 2008 to sign a document creating the first European Grouping of Territorial Cooperation within the EU. The purpose of this organisation is to facilitate the movement of people within this area of nearly 2 million people.

- Courtrai is a member of the Eurotowns network.

== Demographics ==
Group of origin	Year	
Group of origin	2023	
Group of origin	Number	%
Belgians with Belgian background	59,756	75.69%
Belgians with foreign background	10,794	13.67%
Neighboring country	1,638	2.07%
EU27 (excluding neighboring country)	700	0.89%
Outside EU 27	8,456	10.71%
Non-Belgians	8,394	10.63%
Neighboring country	1,164	1.47%
EU27 (excluding neighboring country)	1,747	2.21%
Outside EU 27	5,483	6.95%
Total	78,944	100%

== Culture ==
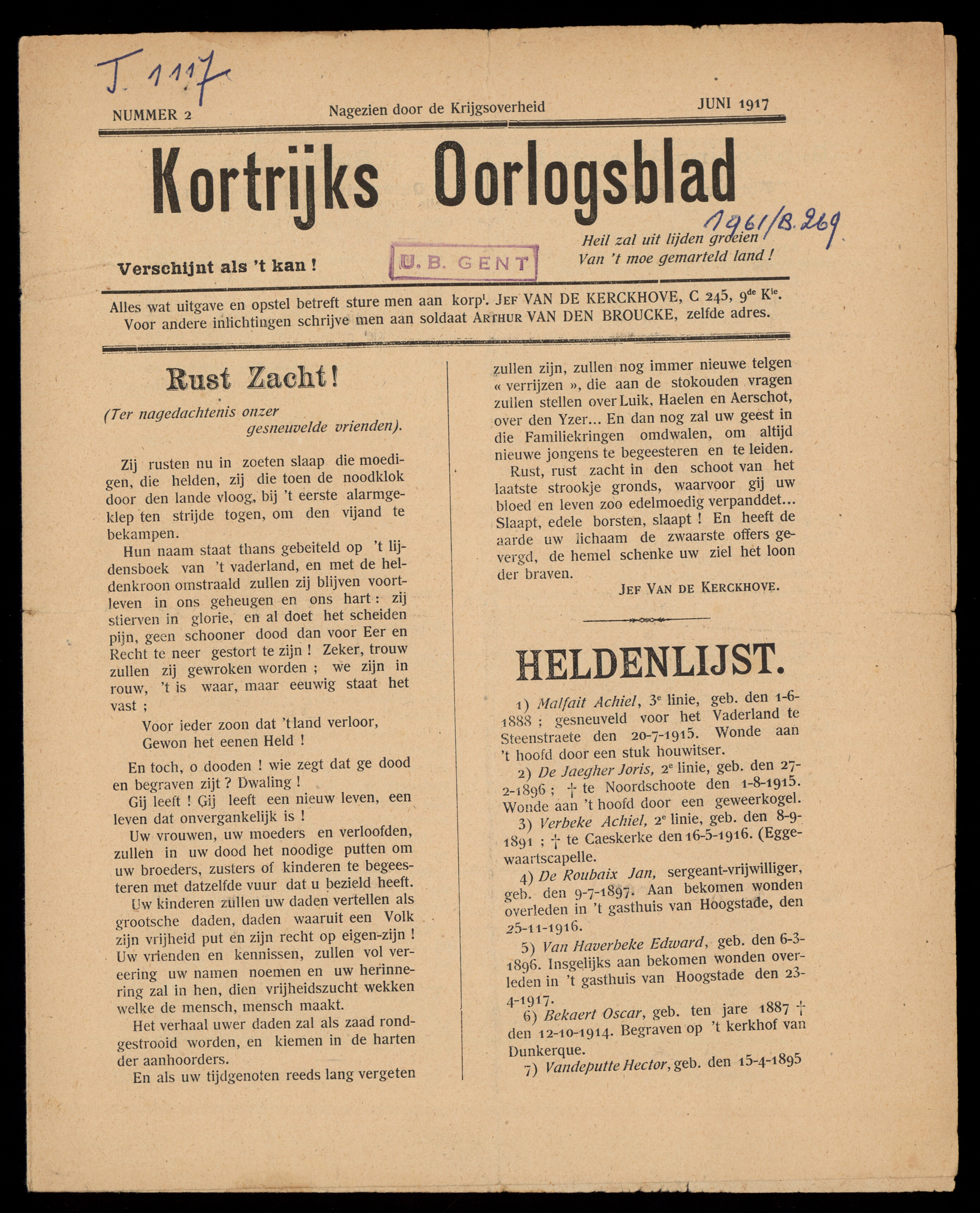
Excerpt from the Kortrijks Oorlogblad of 1917. Preserved in the Ghent University Library.

=== Newspaper ===
- Courtrai used to have its own newspaper in times of war, called het Kortrijks Oorlogsblad.

=== Music ===
- Courtrai has widely recognised local artists, such as:
  - Fapy Lafertin, foremost exponent of the Belgian-Dutch style of gypsy jazz.
  - Goose, electronic rock band with international projection.
  - Amenra, extreme metal band prominent in the European metal scene.
  - Marcel Ponseele, baroque oboist known for his Bach performances and recordings.
  - Balthazar, indie rock band popular in both Belgium and the Netherlands.
  - Michaela Karadjian, soprano Opera singer.

=== Theatres and concert venues ===
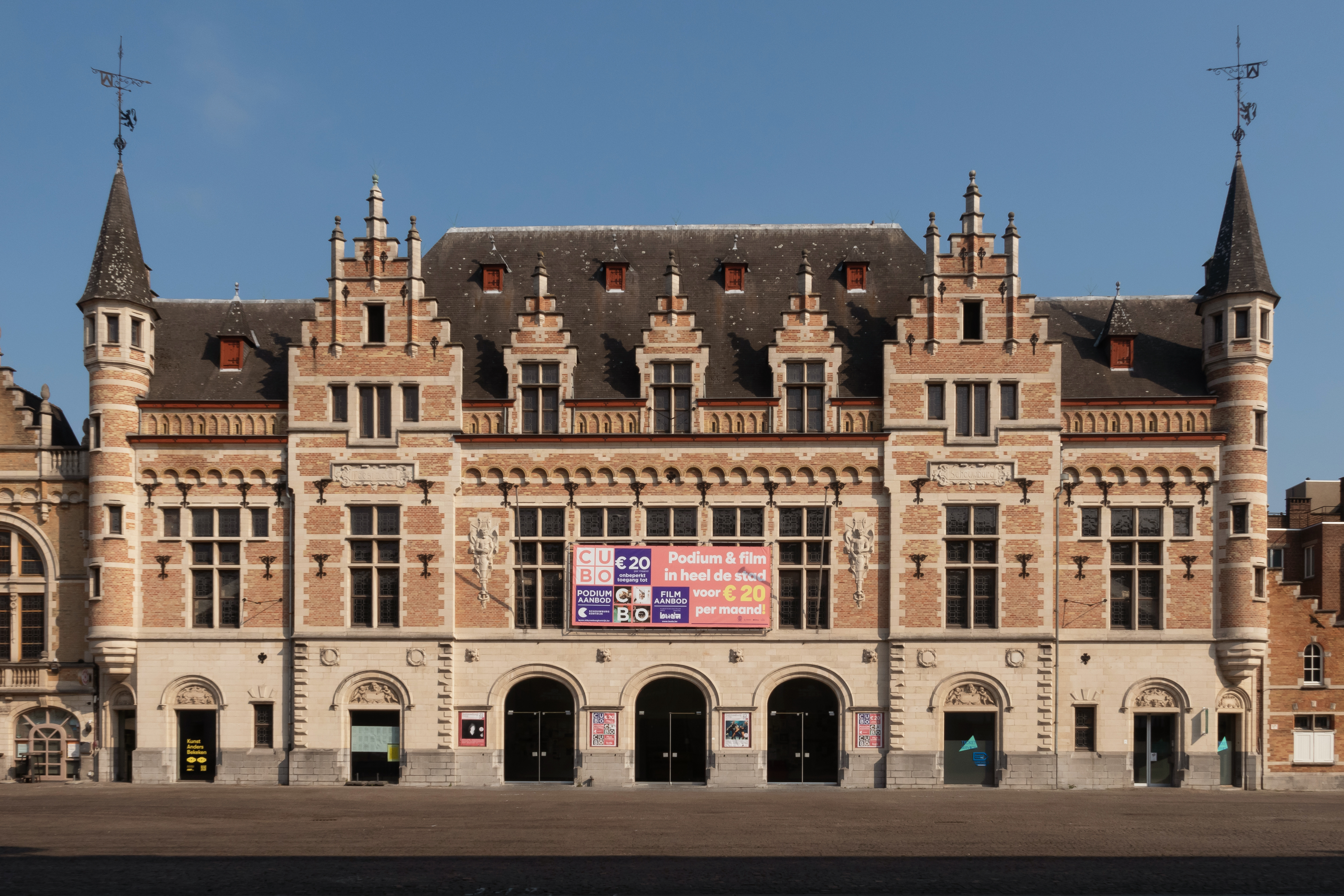
The City Theatre at Schouwburgplein

- Courtrai has several cultural centres, each comprising different locations:
  - Cultural Centre Kortrijk
  - City Theatre (De Schouwburg), a neo-Renaissance architecture theatre on Schouwburgplein known for its glass ceiling, an artwork of the French-Algerian artist Alberola
  - Arenatheatre
  - Antigone Theatre
  - Buda Kunstencentrum (Buda Arts Centre), comprising the cinema Budascoop, the artist residence Tacktower and the artist creation space Budafactory
  - The Concertstudio
  - Music Centre Track*
  - Concert venue De Kreun
- Cinemas
  - Kinepolis, a modern cinema multiplex with 10 screens.
  - Budascoop, a 5 screen cinema, specialised in European movies.

=== Festivals and events ===
The city is host to some sizable cultural events such as:

- Day of the Flemish Community (11 July)
- Golden River City Jazz Festival (first weekend of September)
- Humorologie: cabaret festival
- Next: arts festival in the Eurodistrict Kortrijk-Lille-Tournai
- Happy New Ears: festival of experimental modern music
- Budafest: theatre festival
- The Internationaal Festival van Vlaanderen (April–May): several concerts of classical and modern music.
- Novarock: rock festival in Kortrijk Xpo
- Easter Carnival (Paasfoor): during the weeks after Easter, known as 'Kermis', moving around the country from Kortrijk to Bruges.
- Sinxenfestival: one of the most vivid festivals downtown with street artists, concerts and flea markets all over town
- Kortrijk Congé (July)
- Alcatraz Hard Rock & Metal Festival (August)
- Summer Carnival (weekend in August)
- Student Welcome Concert: rock festival to celebrate the start of the new academic year at the Kortrijk University and the Kortrijk Colleges.

Also, trade shows and events such as the international Design Fair Interieur, Busworld and the Eurodogshow take place in the Kortrijk Xpo event centre. These fairs attract numerous visitors to the city.

In July and August there are various boat tours on the river Leie.

=== Food ===
Local specialities include Kalletaart (apple cake with Calvados), Peperbollen, biscuits, and chocolate little beguines. The town of Heule is the home of the Picobrouwerij Alvinne brewery, while Bellegem is the home of the Bockor brewery.

== Leisure ==
=== Shopping ===
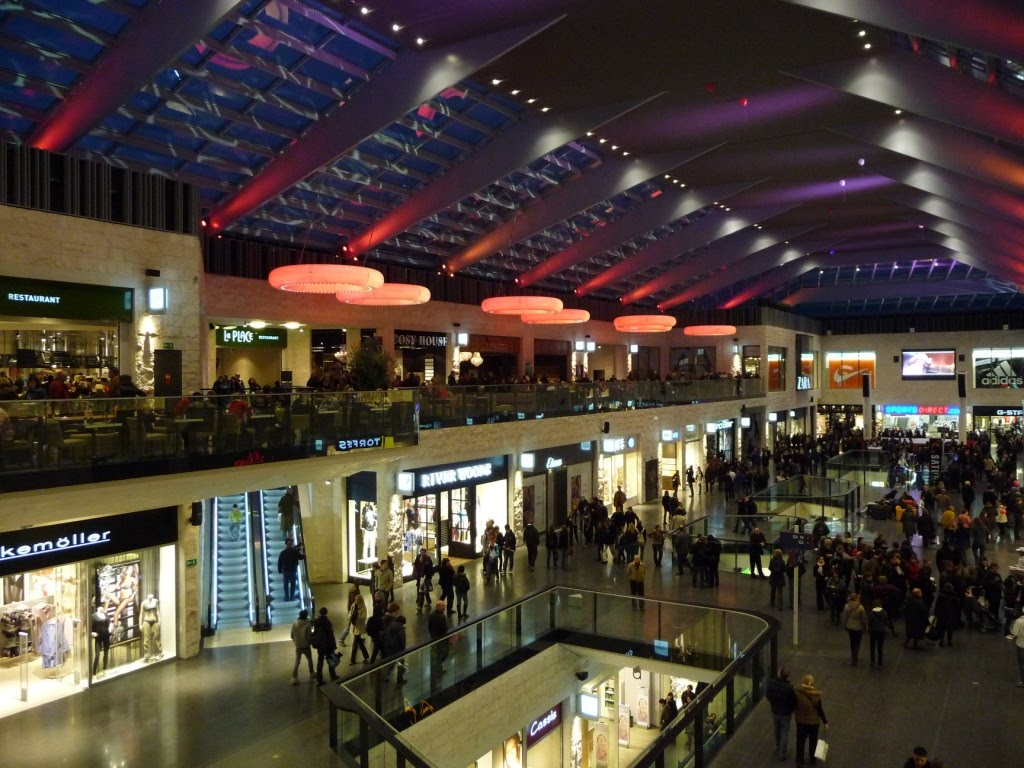
The new downtown shopping centre K in Kortrijk.

- Kortrijk was the first town in Belgium to have a fully traffic-free shopping street, the Korte Steenstraat (1962). Later, a lot of neighbouring streets were also made traffic-free. As a result, Courtrai nowadays has one of the biggest traffic-free areas in Belgium (comprising Lange Steenstraat, Steenpoort, Sint-Jansttraat, Wijngaardstraat and several squares).
- Courtrai has several indoor shopping malls including the Ring Shopping Kortrijk Noord, Bouwcentrum Pottelberg and K in Kortrijk (opened March 2010). The latter is in the town centre and which links the main shopping street (Lange Steenstraat) with the Veemarket square. It contains up to 90 stores, including Mediamarkt, H&M, Zara and many other clothes, food and houseware stores.

=== Parks ===
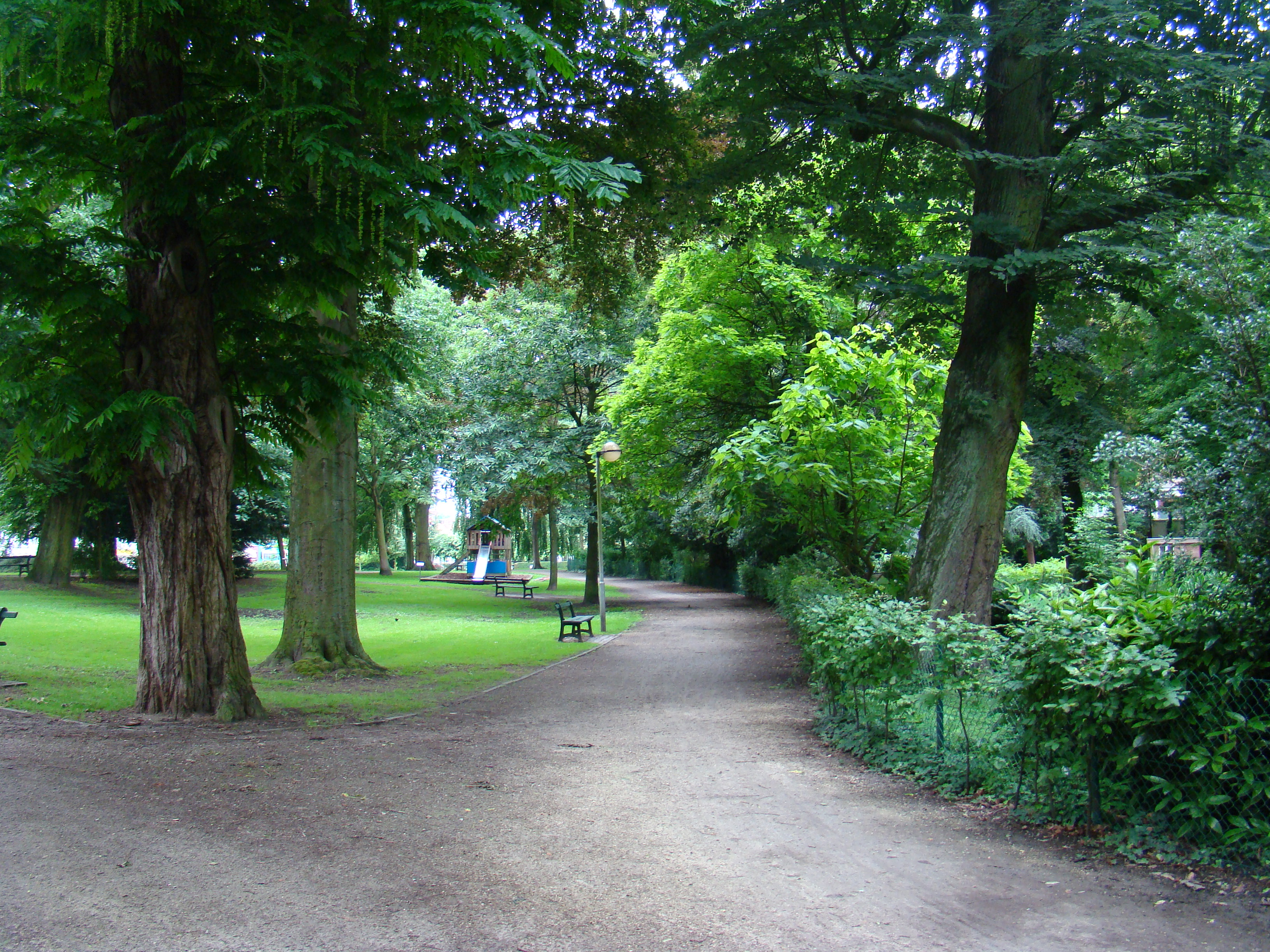
The Queen Astrid park.

- Beguinagepark
- Groeningepark, on the site of the Groeningekouter where the Battle of Courtrai or the Battle of the Golden Spurs took place. In contains the Groeningegate and the Groeninge Monument
- King Albertpark, with the Leiemonument which commemorates the Battle of the Lys
- Gebroeders van Raemdonckpark
- Queen Astridpark in the Overleie district
- 't Plein, a nineteenth-century park, laid out on a former military site
- Park de Blauwe Poort
- Magdalenapark
- Rozentuin, the International Rose Garden
- Stadsgroen Messeyne
- Kasteelpark Blommeghem
- Kasteelpark 't Hooghe
- Nolfpark
- Stadsgroen Venning, with a butterfly garden

== Sports ==
=== Football ===
Kortrijk has three official football clubs.

- K.V. Kortrijk plays in the Belgian First Division A after winning the championship in the former Belgian Second Division during the 2007–2008 season.
- SV Kortrijk plays in the fourth provincial division.
- Wikings Kortrijk is for youth teams.

=== Basketball ===
- Kortrijk Sport CB
- Basketbalteam Kortrijk
- House of Talent Spurs

=== Cycling ===
In Flanders generally, professional cycling is very popular. Many cycling races start, finish or pass through the Kortrijk area. Amongst them are the Driedaagse van West-Vlaanderen, Kuurne–Brussels–Kuurne, Gent–Wevelgem, the Tour of Flanders and Dwars door Vlaanderen. Kortrijk also hosts an after-tour criterium at the start of August called Kortrijk Koerse. Many of the riders who participated in the Tour de France usually appear at the start. In cyclo-cross, the centre of Kortrijk hosts the Urban Cross, currently part of the X²O Badkamers Trophy.

=== Rugby union| ===
- Rugbyclub Curtrycke

=== Tennis ===
- Tennis Club De Egelantier

=== Water polo ===
- KZK, Kortrijkse Zwemkring, arguably the best waterpolo team in Belgium, having won the Belgian championship nine times. In the 2007–2008 season, they won both the championship and the Belgian cup.

== Notable citizens ==
- Emmanuel de Bethune, former mayor (1987–1989) and (1995–2000)
- Hendrik Beyaert, architect
- Francis Bonaert, architect
- John II of Brienne, Count of Eu
- Rob Claeys, footballer
- Carl Colpaert, director, founder of Cineville.
- Hendrik Conscience, writer
- Laurence Courtois, tennis player
- Edmée Daenen, pop artist
- Stefaan De Clerck, politician and former mayor of Kortrijk, former Minister of Justice
- Jos De Cock, Belgian-French painter, watercolorist, etcher and sculptor.
- Nico F. Declercq, physicist and professor
- Gustave Léonard de Jonghe, portrait painter
- Jean-Baptiste De Jonghe, landscape painter
- Carl de Keyzer, photographer
- Pierre de La Rue, Renaissance composer
- Sophie de Schaepdrijver, historian
- Vincent De Vos (1829–1875), painter
- Bruno de Witte (1955–), European law Professor, European thinker
- Ann Demeulemeester, fashion designer
- Stijn Devolder, road bicycle racer
- Ernest Gambart, art publisher and dealer
- Guido Gezelle, poet
- Robert Gillon (1884–1972), lawyer, politician
- Piet Goddaer, singer-composer, mostly under the name:Ozark Henry
- Paul Goethals (1832–1901), first Archbishop of Calcutta
- The members of electro rock band Goose
- Leif Hoste, road bicycle racer
- Isidore of Saint Joseph (1881–1916), Passionist brother, beatified by Pope John Paul II in 1984
- Gilles Joye, Franco-Flemish composer of the Renaissance
- Greg LeMond, US professional cyclist – retired
- Xavier Malisse, tennis player
- Morris (1923–2001), cartoonist, creator of Lucky Luke
- Hanne Gaby Odiele (b. 1988), model
- Tom Omey (b. 1975), middle-distance runner
- Jan Palfyn (1650–1730), doctor, surgeon and inventor of the forceps
- Marcella Pattyn, the last traditional Beguine
- Jean-Jacques Pieters, jazz musician
- Arne Quinze (1971–), designer and conceptual artist
- Jan Robbe (1980–), electronic artist and founder of Entity
- Louis Robbe (1806–1887), painter
- Roelant Savery (1576–1639), painter
- Stijn Streuvels (1871–1969), writer
- Jacobus Vaet, Franco-Flemish composer of the Renaissance
- Guido van Gheluwe (b. 1926), founder of the Orde van den Prince
- Vincent Van Quickenborne (b. 1973), former mayor of the city and former minister of enterprise
- Gella Vandecaveye (b. 1973), judoka, former world champion and Olympic silver medalist
- Stoffel Vandoorne, Formula E racing driver
- Peter Verhoyen, flautist and piccolo player
- George Washington, inventor

== Town twinning ==
Courtrai participates in town twinning to encourage good international relations.

- Bad Godesberg, Germany, since 1964
- Cebu City, Philippines, since 2005
- Frascati, Italy, since 1967
- Greenville, South Carolina, United States, since 1991
- Saint-Cloud, France, since 1993
- Lahore, Pakistan, since 1993
- Tashkent, Uzbekistan, since the late 1980s
- Maidenhead, United Kingdom, since 1981
- Wuxi, China, since 2007

== Photo gallery ==
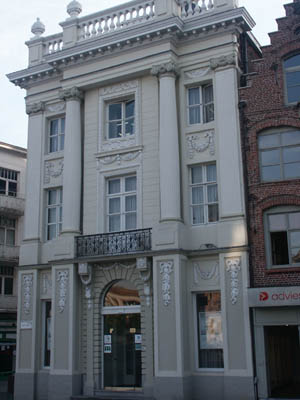
The Patriapalace

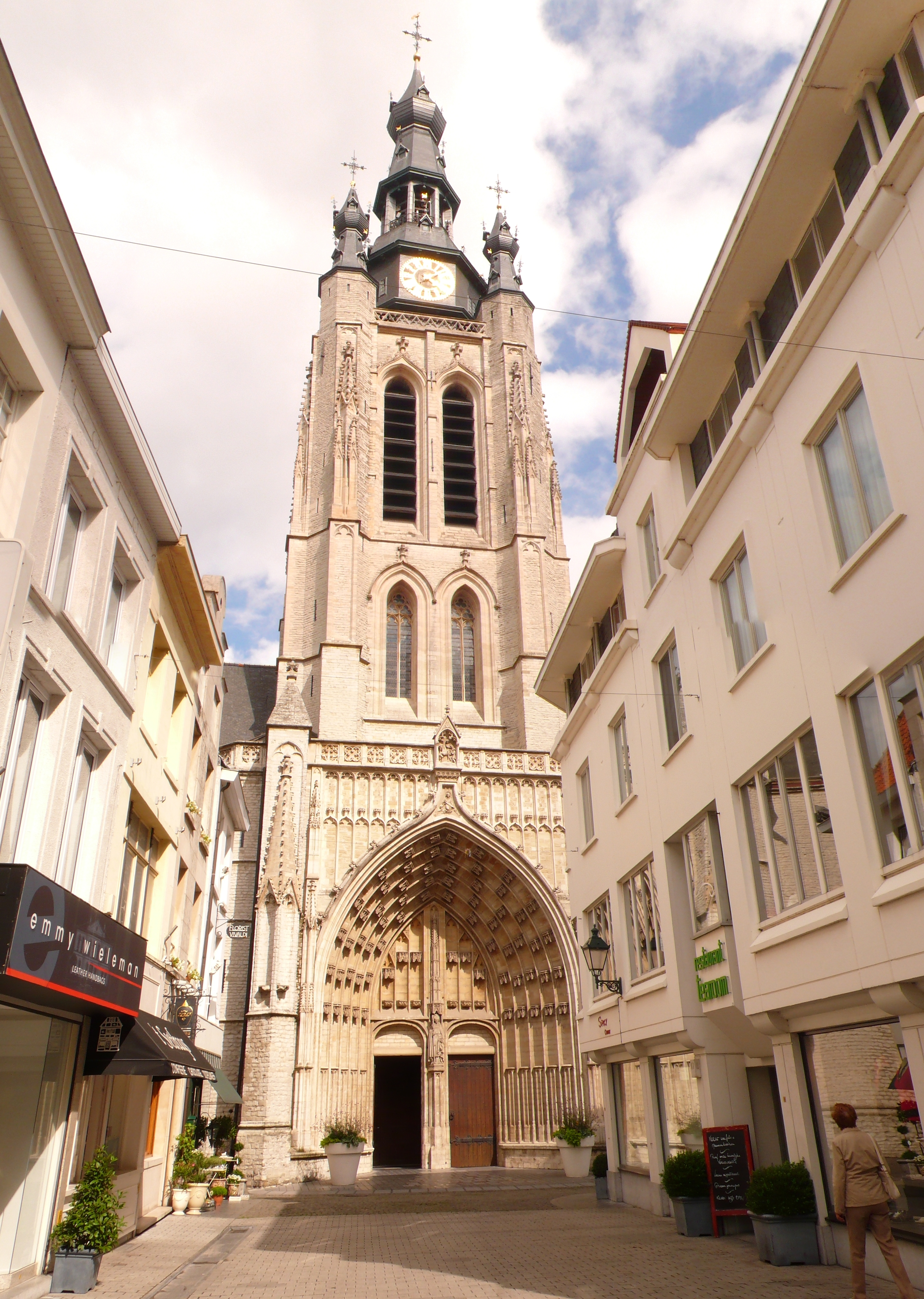
The Saint-Martenstower

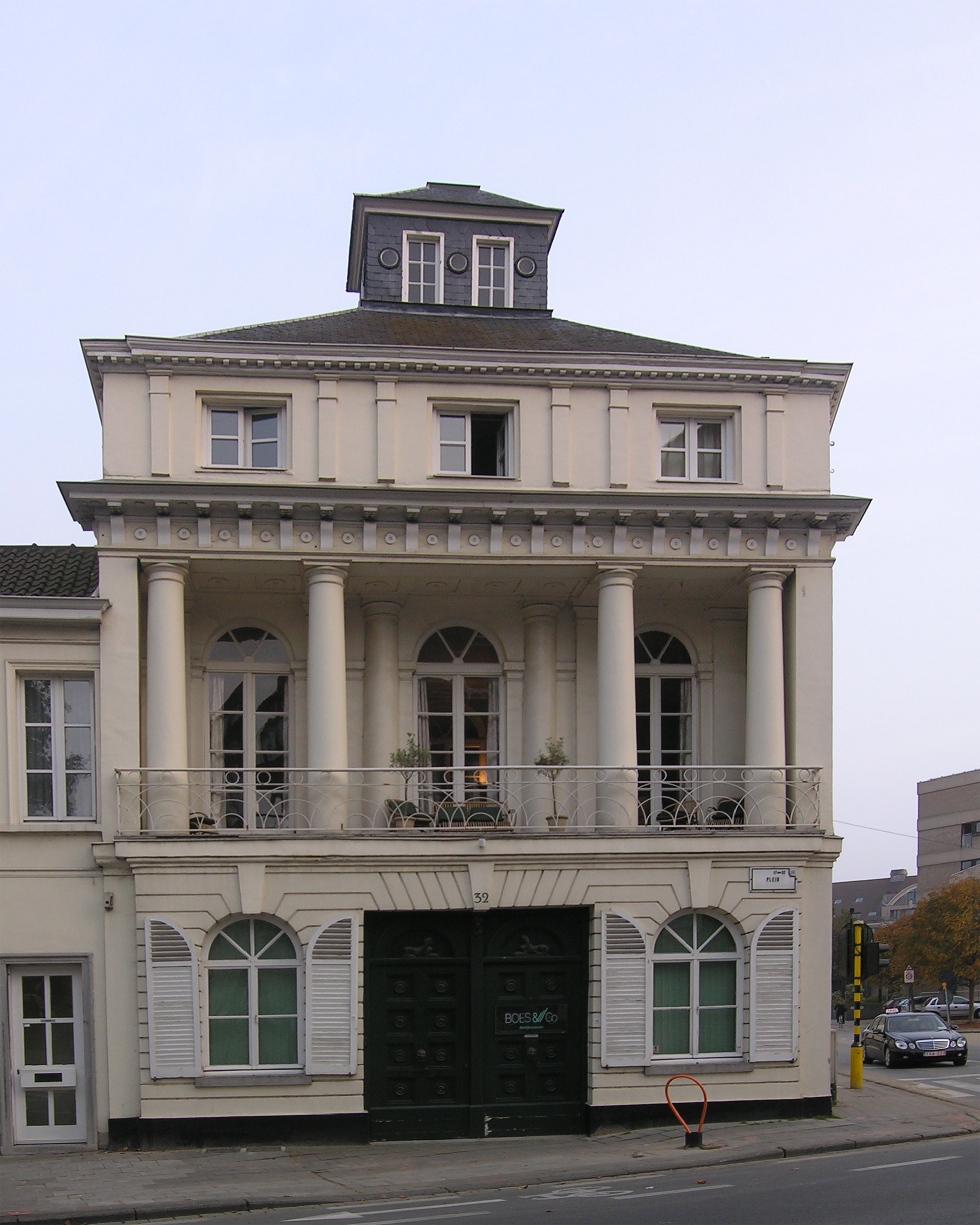
House in Empire style

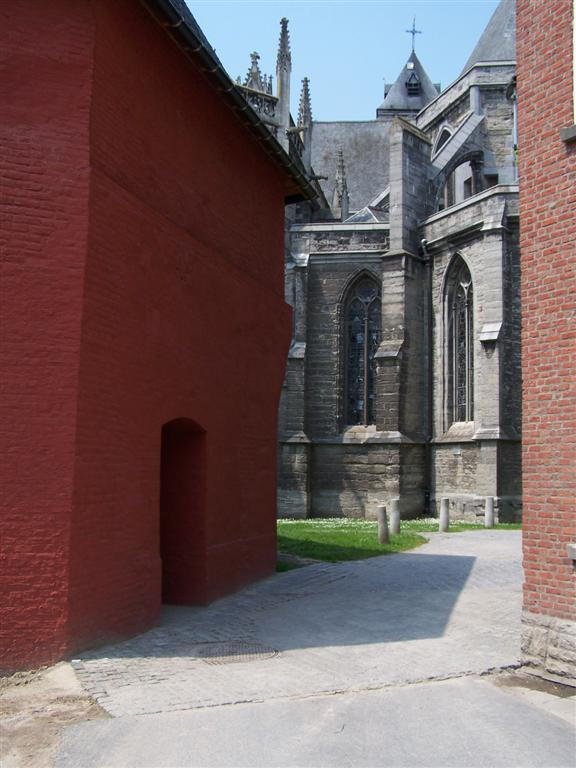
The old town (The Gun Powder Tower, De Kruittoren)

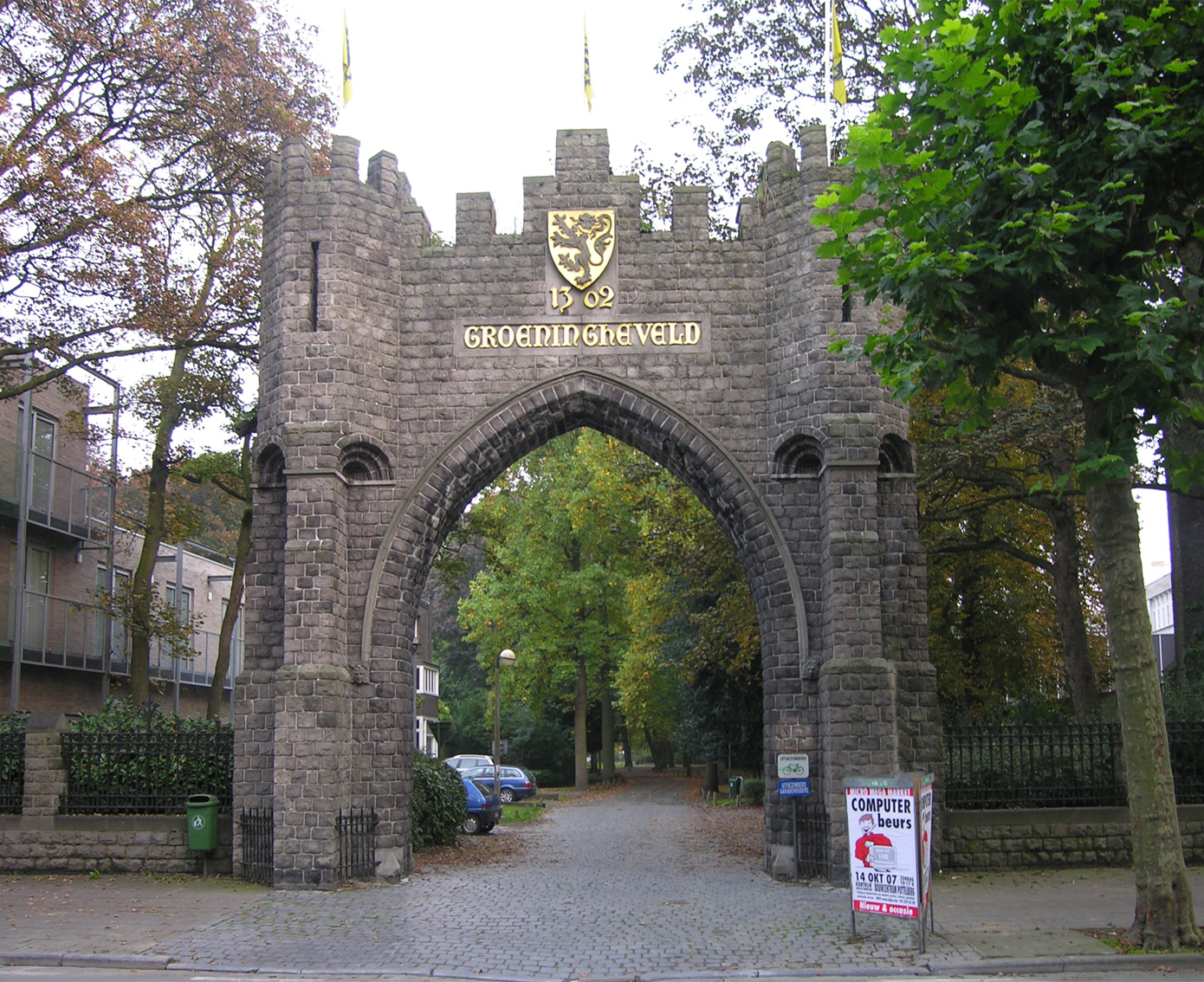
The Groeningegate

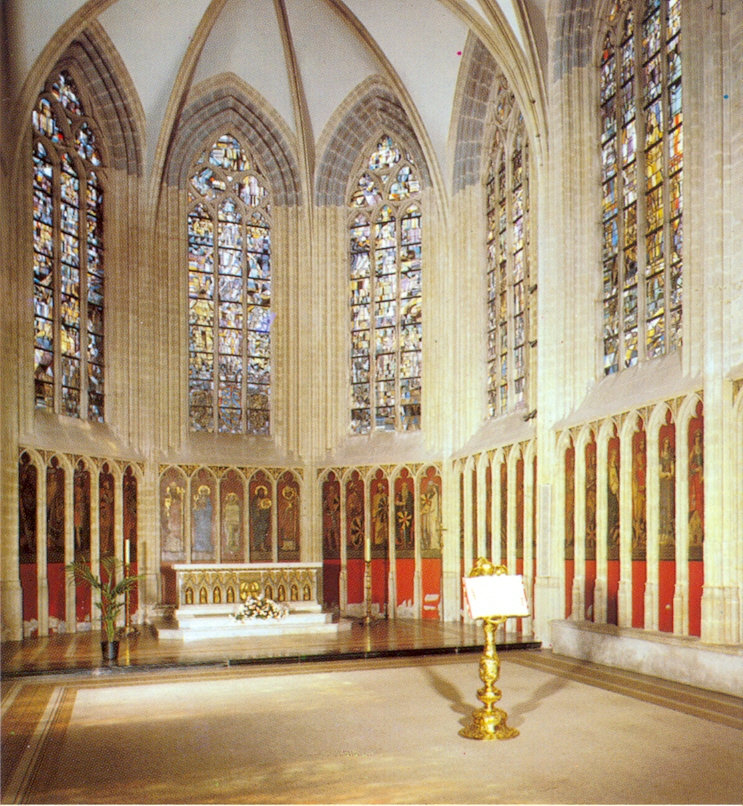
Count's Chapel

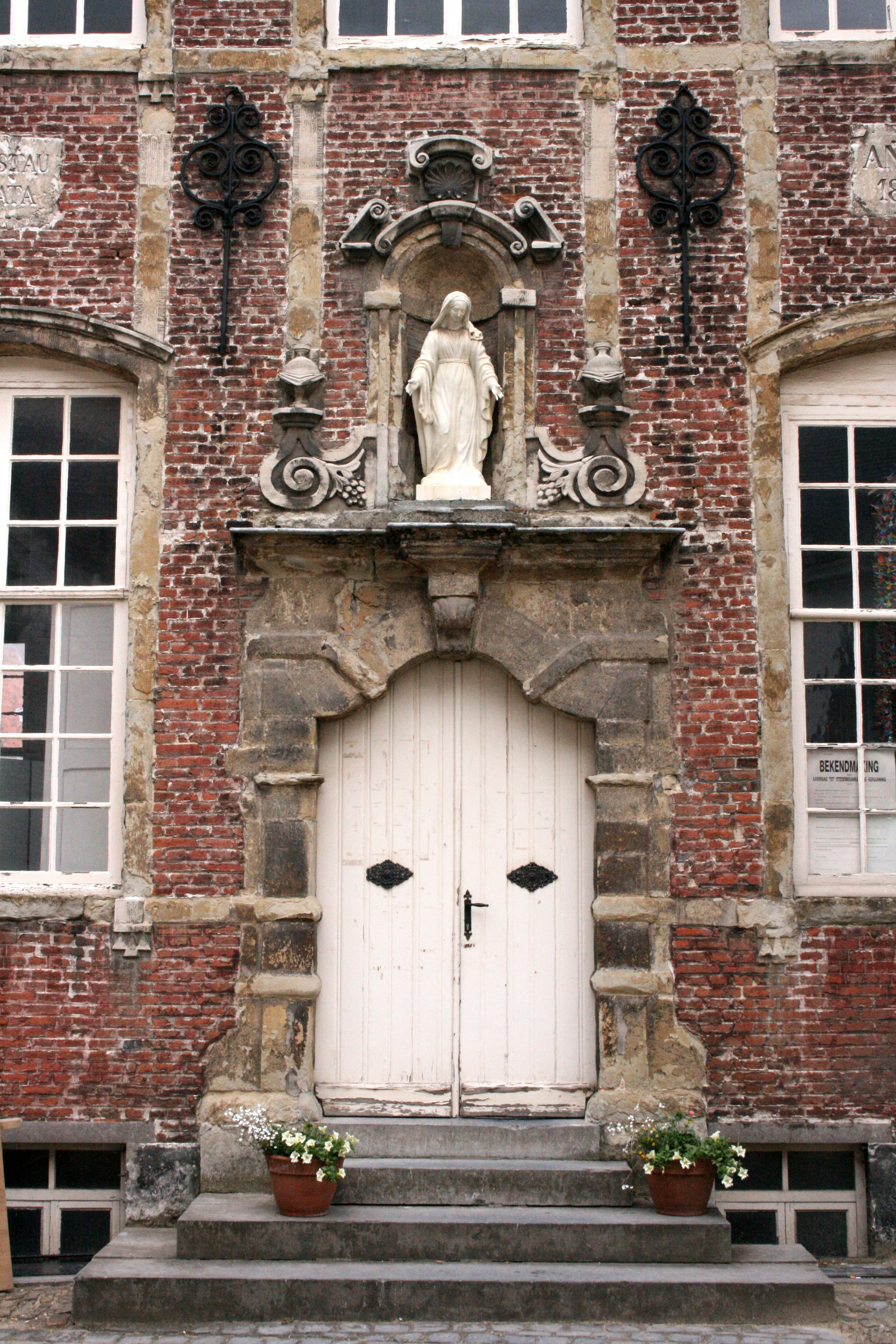
Old houses in the historical city centre

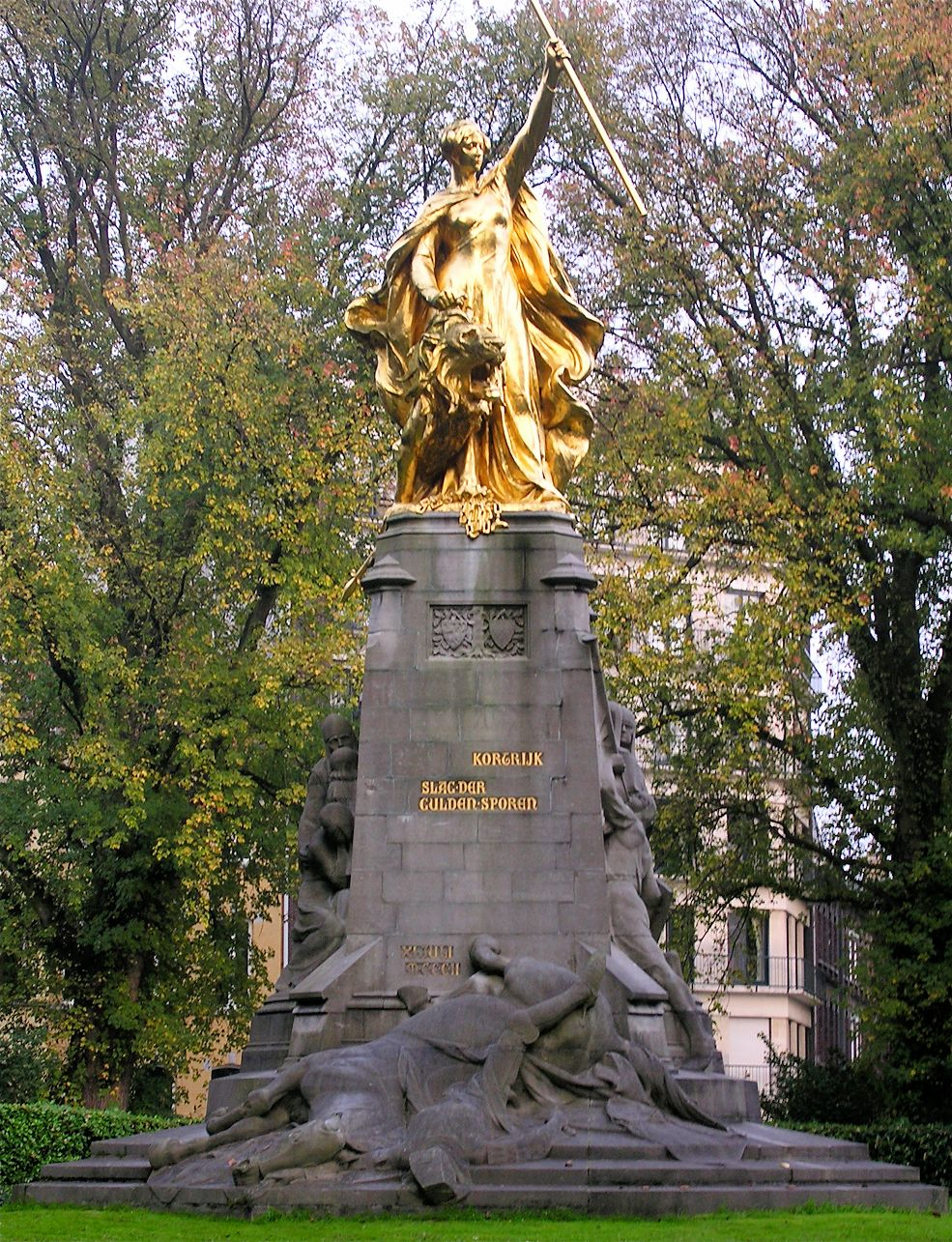
The Groeninge Monument

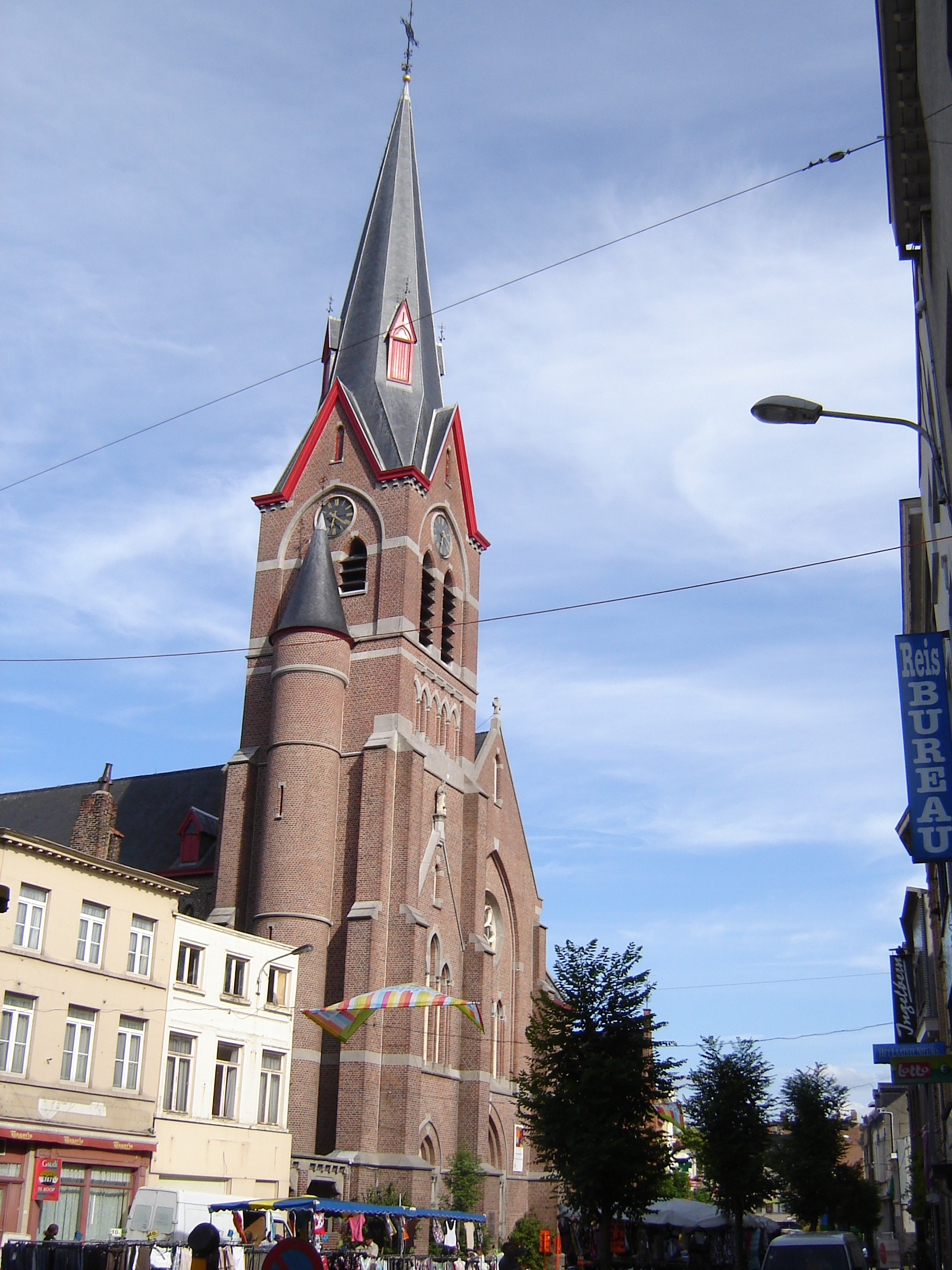
The Saint-Elooi church
