= Kooigem =

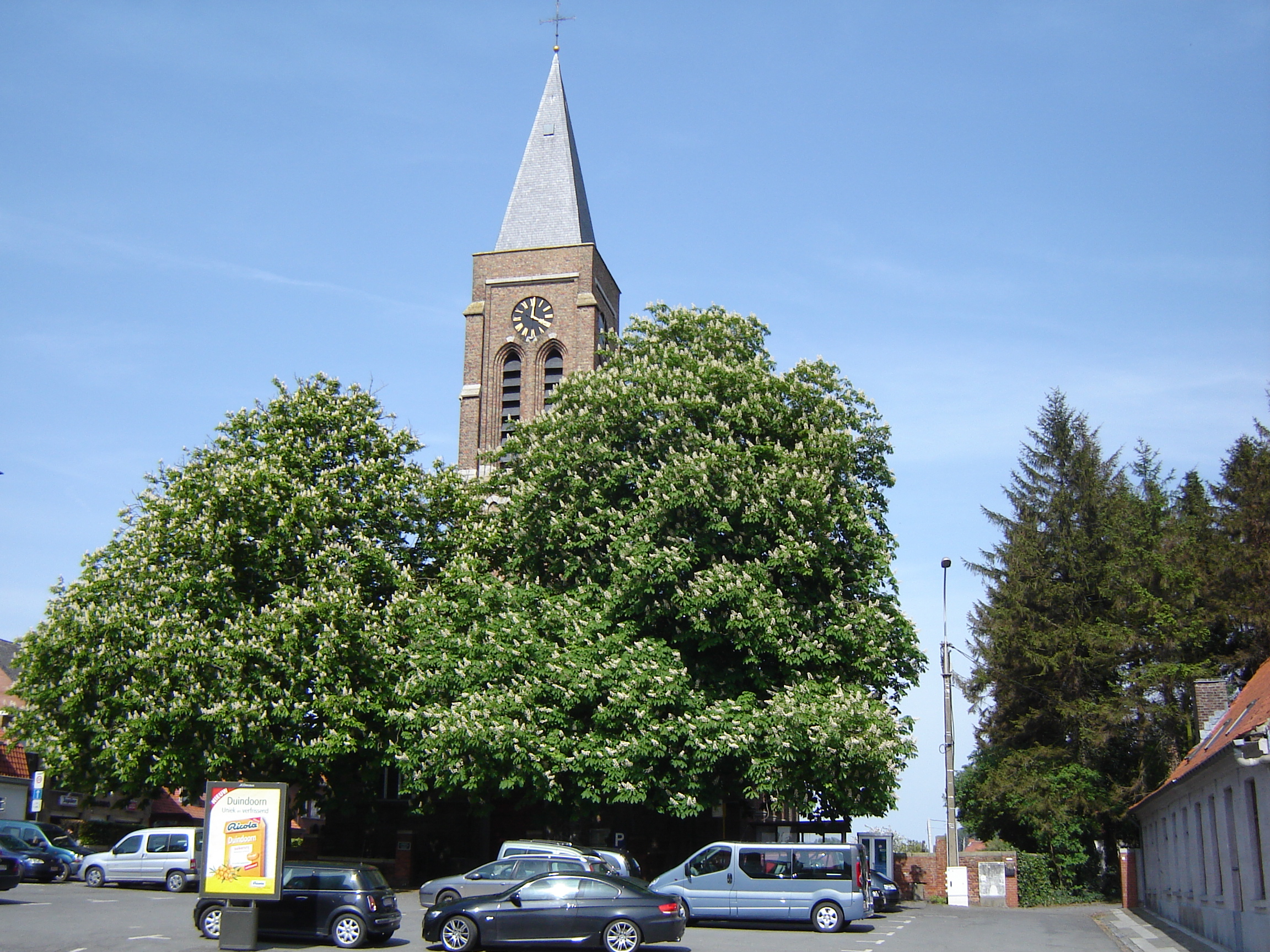

- Location in Belgium
- Coordinates: 50°44′22.99″N 3°19′53.00″E
- Country: Belgium
- Province: West Flanders
- Municipality: Kortrijk

Area
  - Total: 1.85 sq mi (4.78 km^{2})

Population (2007)
  - Total: 791
- Time zone: UTC+1 (CET)
  - Summer (DST): UTC+2 (CEST)
- 8510: 8510
- Area code: 056
- Website: www.kortrijk.be

Kooigem is a village in Greater Kortrijk, Belgium. There is a church and a municipal school KOLibrie with a counterpart in Kortrijk.
