= Rollegem =

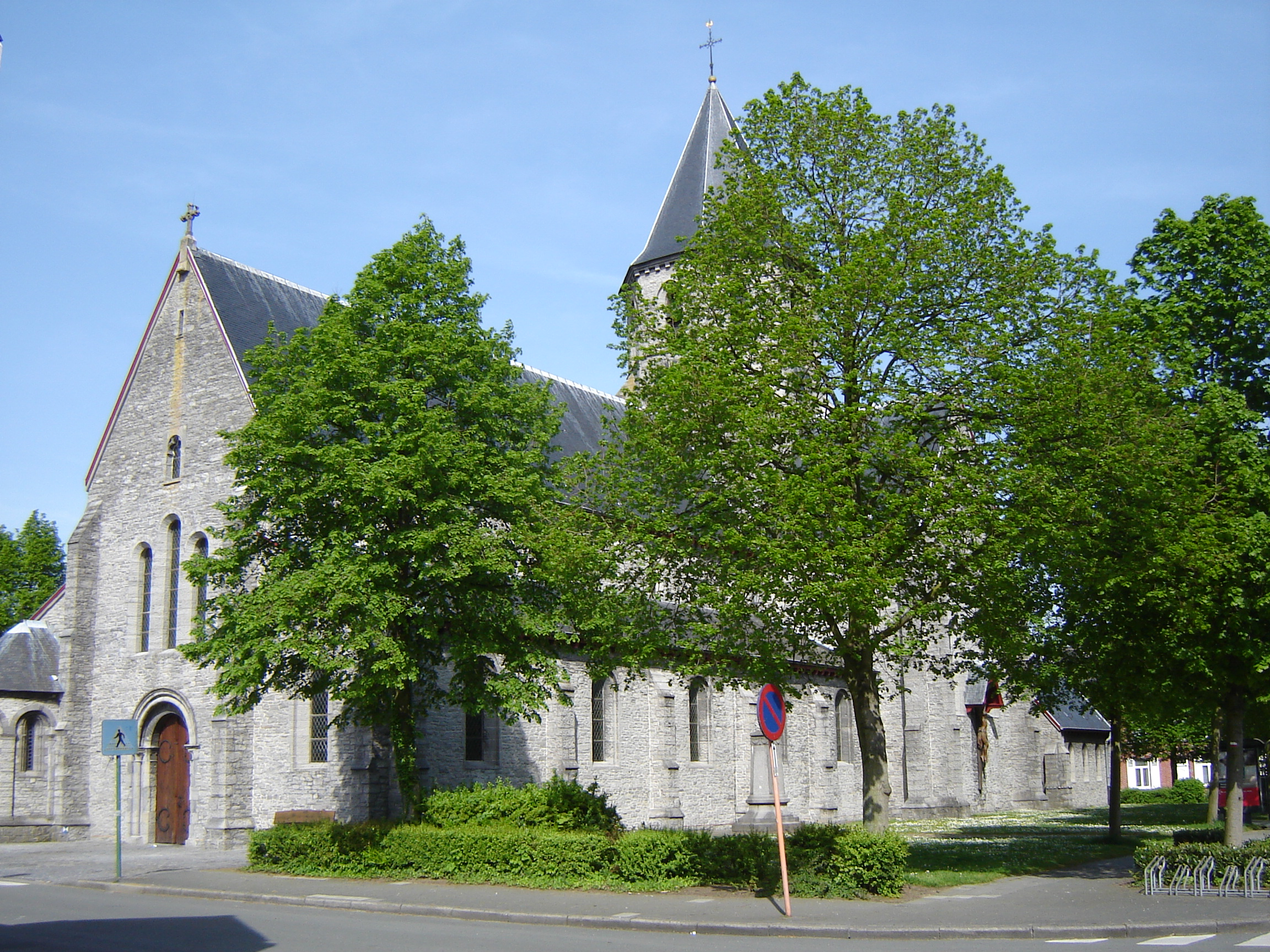
- Sint-Antonius Abtkerk (Rollegem)

- Location in Belgium
- Coordinates: 50°46′N 3°14′E
- Country: Belgium
- Province: West Flanders
- Municipality: Kortrijk

Area
  - Total: 3.27 sq mi (8.47 km^{2})

Population (2007)
  - Total: 2,720
- Time zone: UTC+1 (CET)
  - Summer (DST): UTC+2 (CEST)
- 8510: 8510
- Area code: 056
- Website: http://www.kortrijk.be

Rollegem is a submunicipality of the city of Kortrijk, Belgium. As of 2007 it had a population of 2,720.
