= Grote Markt, Kortrijk =

Square in Kortrijk, Belgium

Grote Markt
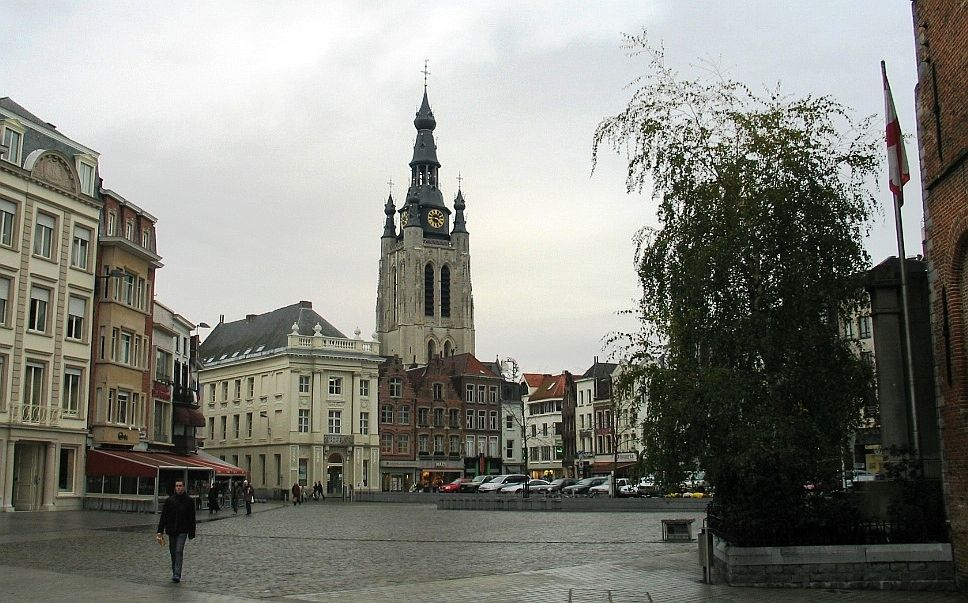

- Location within Belgium
- Location: Kortrijk, West Flanders, Belgium
- Coordinates: 50°49′40″N 3°15′55″E

The Grote Markt (Dutch: [ˌɣroːtə ˈmɑr(ə)kt]; "Big Market") is the central square of Kortrijk, West Flanders, Belgium. Its location on the crossing of some of Kortrijk's most famous and most touristic spots makes the Grote Markt one of the city's busiest squares. It has been pedestrian-friendly since its redevelopment in 1999–2000 and the largest part of the square is now a pedestrian area.

== History ==
The square got its current shape and surface after the demolition of the old Cloth Halls around the still existing Kortrijk Belfry. Its L-shaped form is due to the contours of the medieval Castle of Kortrijk which used to border the eastern side of the current square.

== Events ==
The Grote Markt is often used for cultural and other events, as is the case for Kortrijk's other big squares, such as the Schouwburgplein ("Theatre Square") and the Veemarkt ("Cattle Market").

Annually events that are organised on the Grote Markt include:

- Paasfoor
- Sinksenfeesten
- Summer Carnival
- Vlastreffen

Every Monday morning, a food and clothes market is held on the square.

== Gallery ==
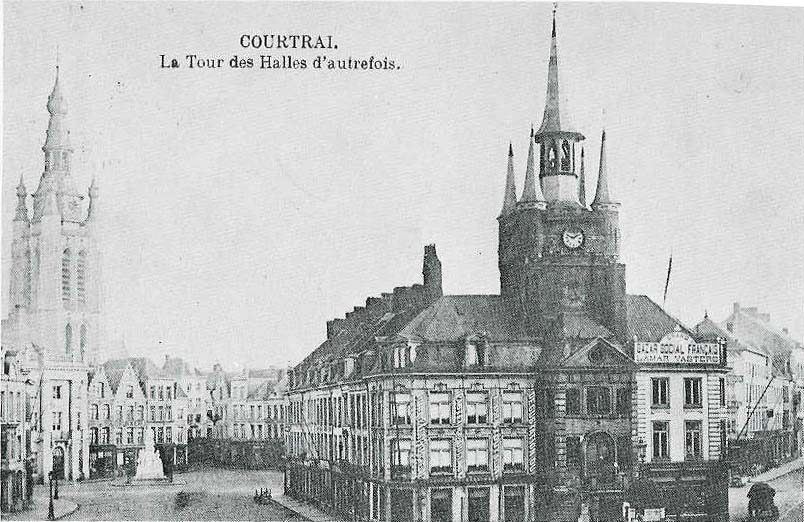
The Cloth Halls in 1897 on today's Grote Markt

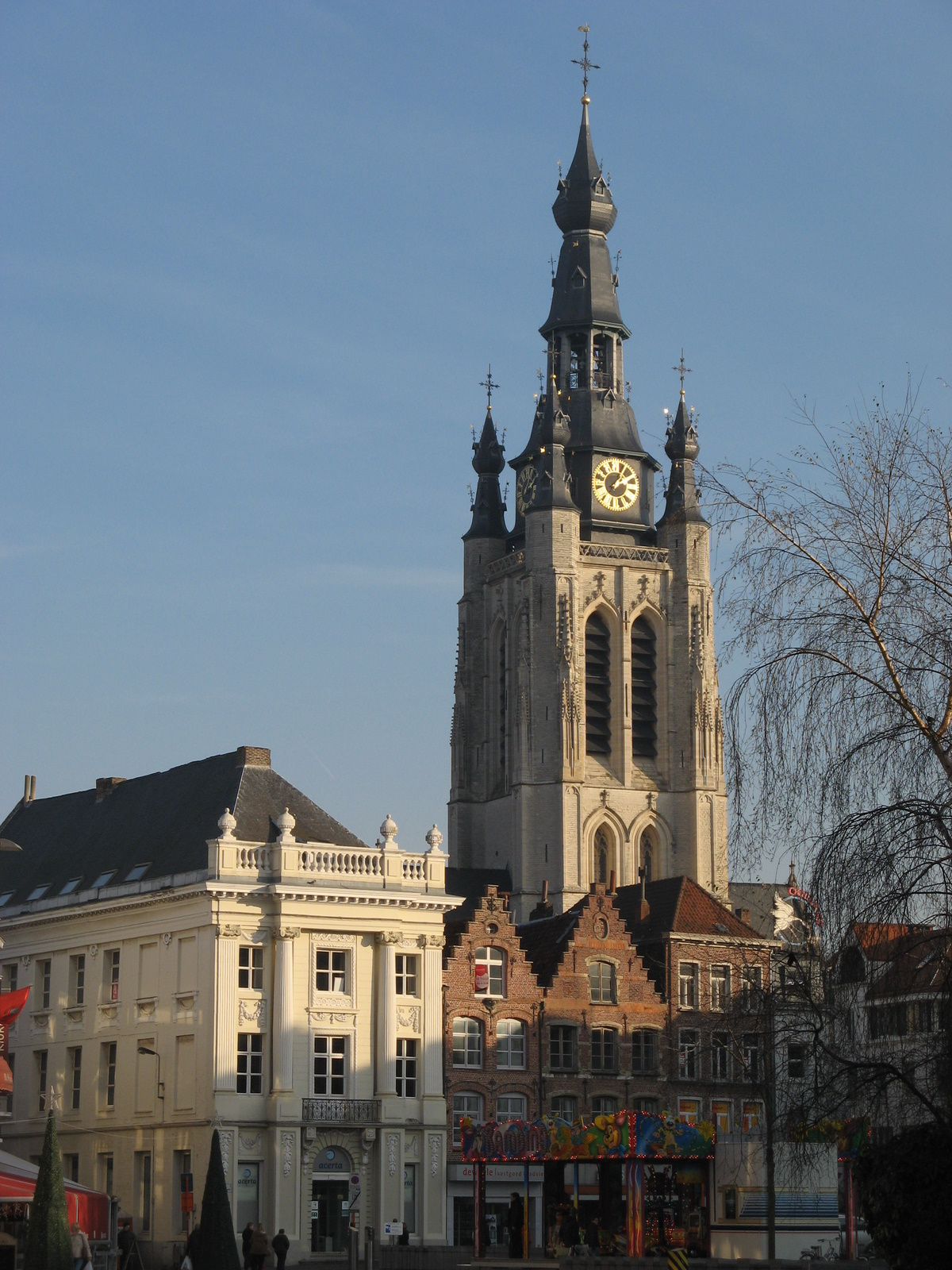
Grote Markt and Saint Martin's Church
