= Ali A Haydar =

Lebanese physician

Ali Haydar
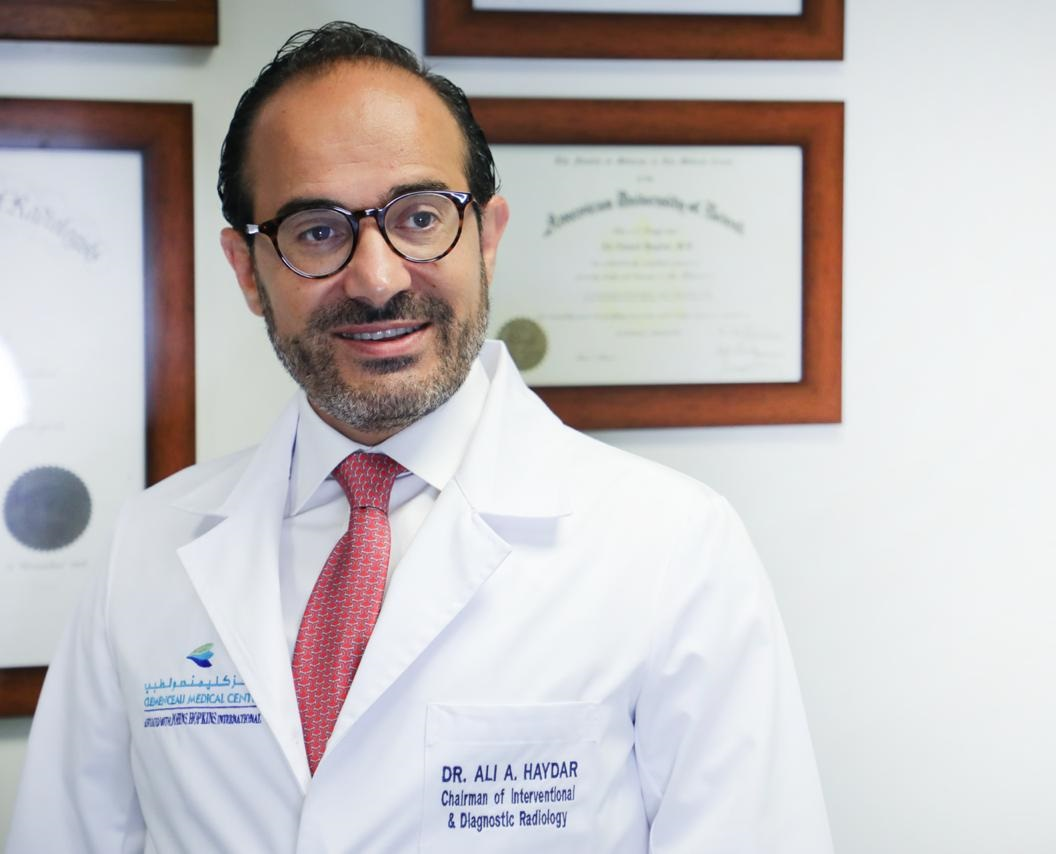
- Title: Associate professor
- Board member of: Clemenceau Medical Center; Pan Arab Interventional Radiology Society

Academic background
- Education: American University of Beirut

Ali A Haydar is Lebanese physician who is an emeritus professor at the American University of Beirut and is the Chief Medical Officer at Aman Hospital, Doha, Qatar and previously the Chairman of radiology at the Clemenceau Medical Center affiliated with Johns Hopkins International since 2018. He is also a member of the Radiological Society of North America, British society of Interventional and Cardiovascular Radiology and the Cardiovascular and Interventional Radiological Society of Europe and fellow of the Pan Arab Interventional radiology society.

== Life and career ==
Haydar completed his BSc in Chemistry in 1996 and then pursued Medical Doctorate from the American University of Beirut in 2000. In 2005, he became member of the Royal College of Physicians and member of the Royal College of Radiologists. In 2008, he became Fellow of the Royal College of Radiologists.

Dr. Ali Haydar is dual trained in Internal Medicine/nephrology obtained in 2005 from Guys and St Thomas NHS trust London and in radiology with a certificate of completion of training CCT from London Deanery in 2010. He was a fellow of Interventional radiology at Imperial college for two years. In 2010-2011 Haydar joined St Bartholomew and The London as consultant in Interventional and cross sectional radiology.

From 2004 to 2006, Haydar peer-reviewed for the American Journal of Kidney Diseases and Nephrology Dialysis and Transplantation, Kidney International and the Lancet in addition to many other radiology journals. He was included in the Who's who medical directory in 2008.

Haydar is also a scientific peer reviewer for the CardioVascular and Interventional Radiology and Diagnostic and Interventional Radiology journals, where he was awarded in 2018 the award of most active reviewer. In 2015 he was selected as the treasurer of Pan Arab Interventional Radiology Society and in 2020, he became a Fellow of the Pan Arab Interventional Radiology Society.

== Major publications ==
- Saade, Charbel; Chokr, Jad; Naffaa, Lena; Faraj, Walid; Shamseddine, Ali; Mukherji, Deborah; Sayegh, Skye El; Assi, Rita; Haydar, Ali (2019). "Reduced Contrast Volume and Radiation Dose During Computed Tomography of the Pancreas: Timing-Specific Contrast Media Protocol". Academic Radiology. 26 (4): 480–488. doi:10.1016/j.acra.2018.05.027. ISSN 1878-4046. PMID 30122624. S2CID 52039890.
- Nasr, Layla A.; Faraj, Walid G.; Al-Kutoubi, Aghiad; Hamady, Mohamad; Khalifeh, Mohamad; Hallal, Ali; Halawani, Hamzeh M.; Wazen, Joelle; Haydar, Ali A. (May 2017). "Median Arcuate Ligament Syndrome: A Single-Center Experience with 23 Patients". CardioVascular and Interventional Radiology. 40 (5): 664–670. doi:10.1007/s00270-016-1560-6. ISSN 1432-086X. PMID 28050657. S2CID 2901009.
- Chami, H. A.; Faraj, W.; Yehia, Z. A.; Badour, S. A.; Sawan, P.; Rebeiz, K.; Safa, R.; Saade, C.; Ghandour, B.; Shamseddine, A.; Mukherji, D.; Haydar, A. A. (December 2015). "Predictors of pneumothorax after CT-guided transthoracic needle lung biopsy: the role of quantitative CT". Clinical Radiology. 70 (12): 1382–1387. doi:10.1016/j.crad.2015.08.003. ISSN 1365-229X. PMID 26392317.
- El Homsi, Maria; Haydar, Ali; Dughayli, Jad; Al-Kutoubi, Aghiad (January 2019). "Trans-Catheter Aspiration of Systemic Air Embolism Causing Cardiac Compromise During CT-Guided Lung Biopsy, a Potentially Lifesaving Maneuver". CardioVascular and Interventional Radiology. 42 (1): 150–153. doi:10.1007/s00270-018-2055-4. ISSN 1432-086X. PMID 30109408. S2CID 52004265.
- Taslakian, Bedros; Faraj, Walid; Khalife, Mohammad; Al-Kutoubi, Aghiad; El-Merhi, Fadi; Saade, Charbel; Hallal, Ali; Haydar, Ali (August 2015). "Assessment of surgical portosystemic shunts and associated complications: The diagnostic and therapeutic role of radiologists". European Journal of Radiology. 84 (8): 1525–1539. doi:10.1016/j.ejrad.2015.04.021. ISSN 1872-7727. PMID 25963504.
- El-Merhi, Fadi; Mohamad, May; Haydar, Ali; Naffaa, Lena; Nasr, Rami; Deeb, Ibrahim Al-Sheikh; Hamieh, Nadine; Tayara, Ziad; Saade, Charbel (April 2018). "Qualitative and quantitative radiological analysis of non-contrast CT is a strong indicator in patients with acute pyelonephritis". The American Journal of Emergency Medicine. 36 (4): 589–593. doi:10.1016/j.ajem.2017.09.026. ISSN 1532-8171. PMID 29055617. S2CID 5011505.
- El Chediak, Alissar; Haydar, Ali A.; Hakim, Ayman; Massih, Sarah Abdel; Hilal, Lara; Mukherji, Deborah; Temraz, Sally; Shamseddine, Ali (2018). "Increase in spleen volume as a predictor of oxaliplatin toxicity". Therapeutics and Clinical Risk Management. 14: 653–657. doi:10.2147/TCRM.S150968. ISSN 1176-6336. PMC 5905497. PMID 29695909.
