= Budescu =

Budescu is a Romanian surname and place name that may refer to:

- People:
  - Constantin Budescu (born 1989), Romanian football player
  - David Budescu, psychologist and academic
- Places:
  - Budescu River, tributary of the Ruscova River

== See also ==
- Budești (disambiguation)
- Budișteanu
- Budișteni (disambiguation)
