= Buda (disambiguation) =

Buda is the western part of Budapest, Hungary.

Buda or BUDA may also refer to:

== Places ==
=== Australia ===
- Buda Castlemaine, an historic house in Castlemaine, Victoria

=== Belgium ===
- Buda (Kortrijk), an historic neighbourhood and island in the city of Kortrijk, Flanders

=== Moldova ===
- Buda, Călărași, a commune in Călărași district

=== Poland ===
- Buda, Masovian Voivodeship

=== Romania ===
- Buda, Buzău, a commune in Buzău County
- Buda, a village in Berzunți Commune, Bacău County
- Buda, a village in Blăgeşti Commune, Bacău County
- Buda, a village in Răchitoasa Commune, Bacău County
- Buda, a village in Coșula Commune, Botoşani County
- Buda, a village in Brăeşti Commune, Iaşi County
- Buda, a village in Lespezi Commune, Iaşi County
- Buda, a village in Cornetu Commune, Ilfov County
- Buda, a village in Ariceștii Rahtivani Commune, Prahova County
- Buda, a village in Râfov Commune, Prahova County
- Buda, a village in Râşca Commune, Suceava County
- Buda, a village in Zvoriștea Commune, Suceava County
- Buda, a village in Alexandru Vlahuţă Commune, Vaslui County
- Buda, a village in Bogdăneşti Commune, Vaslui County
- Buda, a village in Oșești Commune, Vaslui County
- Buda, a village administered by Ocnele Mari town, Vâlcea County
- Buda, a village in Corbița Commune, Vrancea County
- Buda Crăciuneşti, a village in Cislău Commune, Buzău County
- Buda (Argeș), a tributary of the Argeș River in Argeș County
- Buda, a tributary of the Șoimeni River in Cluj County
- Buda, a tributary of the Cernu River in Bacău County

=== Ukraine ===
- Buda (Romanian: Buda), a village in Mahala Hromada, Chernivtsi Oblast
- Buda, a village in Chornobyl Raion which was taken out of registry after the Chernobyl disaster
- Buda, a river, a tributary of Khorol

=== United States ===
- Buda, Colorado, an unincorporated community in Weld County
- Buda, Illinois, a village
- Buda, Nebraska, an unincorporated community
- Buda, Texas, a city

== Other ==
- Archimandrite Averchie (Atanasie Iaciu Buda; 1806/1818–?), Aromanian monk and schoolteacher
- Deadly Buda, American DJ and graffiti artist
- Buda, the Hungarian name of the Hunnic ruler Bleda
- Mario Buda (1883–1963), Italian anarchist, Galleanist, and likely assailant of the 1920 Wall Street bombing
- Buda (folk religion) or Bouda, the Ethiopian name for a werehyena
- Buda Engine Co., a U.S. engine manufacturer.
- Bukidnon–Davao Road, also known as BuDa Road, a highway in the Philippines

== See also ==
- Buda River (disambiguation)
- Buddha (disambiguation)
- Bodø Municipality, a municipality in Norway with a similar pronunciation.
- Budeni (disambiguation)
- Budești (disambiguation)
