= Budișteanu =

Budișteanu is a Romanian surname that may refer to:

- Alexandru Budișteanu (1907–1951), Romanian bobsledder
- Constantin Budișteanu (1838–1911), Romanian general officer and politician
- Ignație Budișteanu (1888–?), Bassarabian politician
- Ionel Budișteanu (1919–1991), Romanian violinist and conductor
- Radu Budișteanu (1902–1991), Romanian activist of the Iron Guard

== See also ==
- Budescu
- Budești (disambiguation)
- Budișteni (disambiguation)
