= Haggar Hilda Ampadu =

Ghanaian research scientist

Dr. Haggar Hilda Ampadu
- Born: Eastern Region Ghana
- Occupations: Research scientist; Policist
- Years active: 2002–present

Haggar Hilda Ampadu is a Ghanaian regulator, pharmacoepidemiologist (research scientist) and policy advocate. As of 2019, she is the Inspector-General of Schools of the National Schools Inspectorate Authority under Ghana's Ministry of Education.

== Early life ==
Hilda was born at the Kwahu Tafo Government Hospital to Charles Ampadu and Mary Ampadu of Kwahu Nteso in the Eastern Region. She is married with two children.

== Education ==
She attended Harrow International School in Abeka Lapaz, where she stayed from kindergarten through her Junior High School.

She attended Wesley Girls’ High School and graduated in 1995.

Hilda progressed to the Kwame Nkrumah University of Science and Technology (KNUST) in 1997 to pursue a BSc Biological Science and later moved to United States in 2001 where she graduated with MSc Project Management from Boston University in 2011.

Hilda read her PhD in Pharmaceutical Policy & Regulation at the Utrecht University in the Netherlands, graduating in 2018.

== Career ==
In 2002, she started as a Clinical Data Manager (Consultant) for GSK's Diabetes Clinical Trials at Parexel International in Waltham, Massachusetts, USA. She continued to hold other positions such as Clinical Data Manager for Addiction (Opioid Dependence and Alcohol Dependence) at Alkermes 2003 to 2005 and proceeded to Cardiovascular Interventions (Coronary Stents) at Boston Scientific Corporation from and 2005 to 2007.

For a year, she served as a Senior Clinical Data Manager (Consultant) for Oncology (Bone Sarcomas) Clinical Trials at ARIAD Pharmaceuticals, Inc. Continuing to the Premier Research Group, where she was Senior Data Manager for Johnson & Johnson Medical's orthopedics (spine) clinical trials between June 2008 and May 2009.

She further served as a Senior Data Manager between 2009 and 2011 in Epidemiological Studies (Health/Bone Surveys) at the New England Research Institutes, Inc. Her career followed a similar trajectory after her graduate programme in project management, as she was Project Manager (Data Management) for Cardiovascular Interventions (Coronary Stents) Clinical Trials at Abbott Vascular, and Project Manager (Consultant) for Oncology (Leukemia) Clinical Trials at Infinity Pharmaceuticals for six months each, from January to December, 2011.

=== National Schools Inspectorate Authority ===
In 2019, Hilda was appointed by President Nana Akufo-Addo to head the National Inspectorate Board, under Ghana's Ministry of Education. Under the Education Regulatory Bodies Act (Act 1023, Part 4), the National Inspectorate Board was renamed to National Schools Inspectorate Authority (NaSIA).

This instituted a new title Inspector-General of Schools. The National Schools Inspectorate Authority (NaSIA) licenses and inspects all pre-tertiary public and private schools in Ghana.

== Publications ==
- Adverse Drug Reaction Reporting in Africa and a Comparison of Individual Case Safety Report Characteristics Between Africa and the Rest of the World: Analyses of Spontaneous Reports in VigiBase
- Chapter in Mann's Pharmacovigilance
- Prescribing patterns and compliance with World Health Organization recommendations for the management of severe malaria: A modified cohort event monitoring study in public health facilities in Ghana and Uganda
- The contribution of Ghanaian patients to the reporting of adverse drug reactions
- Organizational capacities of national pharmacovigilance centres in Africa
- Safety Experience During Real-World Use of Injectable Artesunate in Public Health Facilities in Ghana and Uganda: Outcomes of a Modified Cohort Event Monitoring Study (CEMISA)
