= Clemenceau Medicine International =

Middle Eastern health care organization

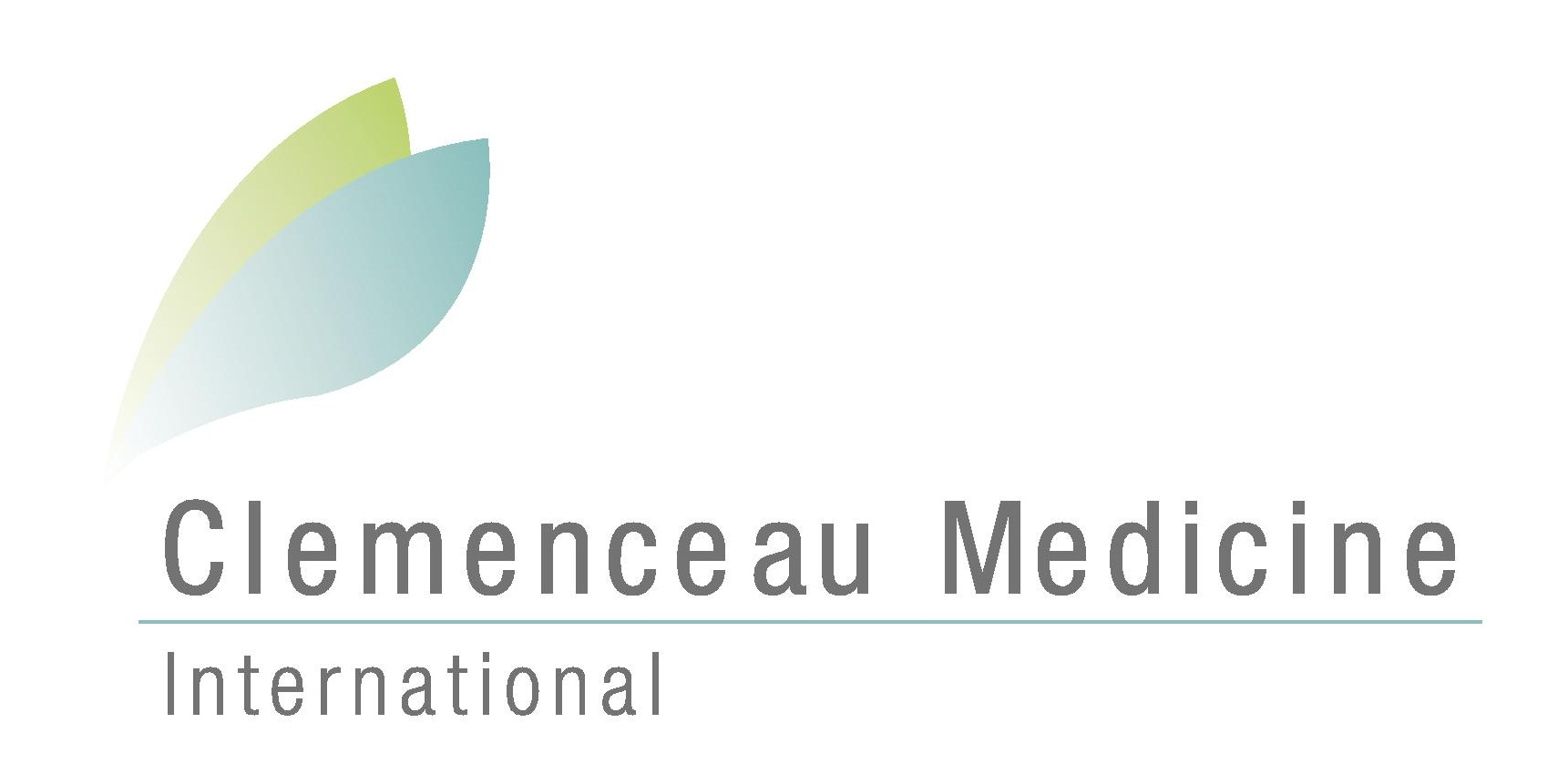

Clemenceau Medicine International (CMI) is a health care organization and is responsible for building and operating several medical centers in the Middle East region. CMI is a sister company to Clemenceau Medical Center affiliated with Johns Hopkins Medicine International, and provides two categories of services: technical assistance and advisory services on healthcare facility setup, and management consultancy.

- Clemenceau Medical Center DHCC: Healthcare facility setup and management operation by CMI, a 100-bed medical center located in Dubai, United Arab Emirates.
- Abdali Hospital: Healthcare facility setup by CMI, a 200-bed medical center located in Amman, Jordan.
