= Nicole Karam =

Interventional cardiologist

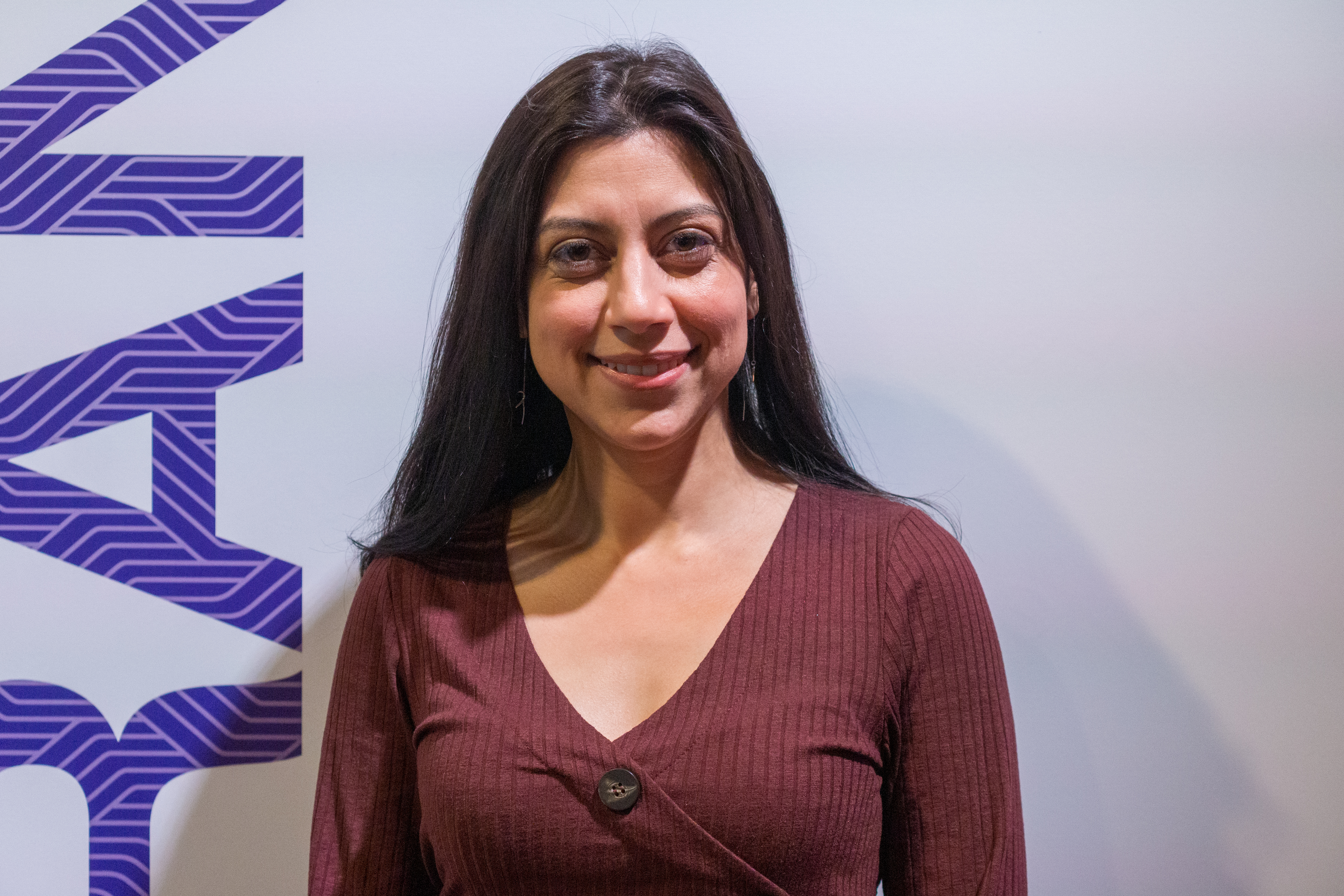
- Nicole Karam at the Women's Forum Global Meeting in November 2019
- Scientific career
- Fields: Interventional Cardiology; Valvular disease; Sudden Cardiac Death; Epidemiology
- Workplaces: European Hospital Georges Pompidou, University of Paris, INSERM
- Thesis: Infarctus du myocarde et mort subite : approche en population (2017)

Nicole Karam is a French professor of cardiology, and the head of the cardiology department at the University of Balamand. Karam is the Director of Invasive Cardiology at Clemenceau Medical Center. She is also the Secretary of the European Association of Percutaneous Cardiovascular Interventions (EAPCI), and a member of the French National Academy of Medicine college.

== Career ==
Karam began her career at Hôpital Européen Georges-Pompidou and Paris Cité University where she was appointed Professor of Cardiology in 2022. She moved to Lebanon in 2025 and is currently the Head of Cardiology Department at the University of Balamand and the Head of the Invasive Cardiology Division at Clemenceau Medical Center.

Karam's field of work is interventional cardiology. She performs both percutaneous coronary and valvular interventions, allowing the treatment of coronary artery disease and the repair or replacement of heart valves without the need for surgery. She is also engaged in improving prevention and management of cardiac diseases among women.

Holding a Ph.D. in Epidemiology and Statistics, Karam has published more than 200 articles in peer-reviewed international journals. Her main research topics are heart valve diseases, sudden cardiac death and cardiovascular diseases in women.

== Awards and honors ==
In 2019, the French-American Foundation named Karam Young Leader of the year, as a recognition for her achievements. She was also selected as a Rising Talent 2019 by the Women's Forum for the Economy & Society. She was designated as a member of the French National Academy of Medicine (France) college in 2023, and, in 2026, she was elected Secretary of the European Association of Percutaneous Cardiovascular Interventions (EAPCI).
