= Anna-Maria Belli =

British interventional radiologist

Anna-Maria Belli, MD, FCIRSE is a British interventional radiologist known for her work in vascular interventional radiology and for holding leadership positions in interventional radiology societies in Britain and Europe.

== Training and career ==
Belli received her medical degree from the Middlesex Hospital Medical School (London, England) in 1980. She then completed her diagnostic radiology residency and interventional radiology fellowship at St. George’s Hospital (London, England). After completing her fellowship, Belli worked as an honorary consultant radiologist at the Royal Hallamshire Hospital (Sheffield, England), followed by the Hammersmith Hospital (London, England), before returning to St. George’s Hospital where she continued to work until her retirement.

Since 2008 Belli has been Professor of Interventional Radiology at St. George’s Hospital.

Belli was the first female president of the British Society of Interventional Radiology (BSIR) from 2001 to 2003, and from 2014 until 2015 was the first female president of the CardioVascular and Interventional Radiology Society of Europe (CIRSE). Belli has been an advocate for women in interventional radiology and a proponent of the role of an interventional radiologist as a clinician.

== Research ==
Belli's work covered a variety of topics from interventional radiology training to procedures. She has been involved in research looking at the efficacy of drug eluting balloons for peripheral arterial disease and co-authored the FUME trial, the only randomized control trial comparing abdominal myomectomy and uterine artery embolization. She was also a co-applicant for FEMME, a multicenter randomized control trial looking at myomectomy and uterine artery embolization, and has been involved in other work regarding uterine artery embolization. During her career, Belli was a member of the National Institute for Health and Clinical Excellence (NICE) Guidelines Development Group for heavy menstrual bleeding and served on the committee of safety for devices for Medicines and Healthcare products Regulatory Agency from 2000 to 2009.

== Selected publications ==
- Morgan, Robert; Belli, Anna-Maria (1 June 2003). "Current Treatment Methods for Postcatheterization Pseudoaneurysms". Journal of Vascular and Interventional Radiology. 14 (6): 697–710. doi:10.1097/01.RVI.0000071089.76348.6A. ISSN 1051-0443. PMID 12817037.
- Belli, Anna-Maria; Markose, George; Morgan, Robert (April 2012). "The Role of Interventional Radiology in the Management of Abdominal Visceral Artery Aneurysms". CardioVascular and Interventional Radiology. 35 (2): 234–243. doi:10.1007/s00270-011-0201-3. PMID 21674280. S2CID 7908692.
- Chun, Joo-Young; Morgan, Robert; Belli, Anna-Maria (April 2010). "Radiological Management of Hemoptysis: A Comprehensive Review of Diagnostic Imaging and Bronchial Arterial Embolization". CardioVascular and Interventional Radiology. 33 (2): 240–250. doi:10.1007/s00270-009-9788-z. PMID 20058006. S2CID 33506340.
- "Carotid artery stenting compared with endarterectomy in patients with symptomatic carotid stenosis (International Carotid Stenting Study): an interim analysis of a randomised controlled trial". The Lancet. 375 (9719): 985–997. March 2010. doi:10.1016/S0140-6736(10)60239-5. PMC 2849002.

== Awards ==
Belli has been recognized by national and international societies for clinical excellence. Some of her notable awards include the Gold Medal from the British Society of Interventional Radiology (BSIR) in 2015, the Gold Medal of the Cardiovascular and Interventional Radiological Society of Europe (CIRSE) in 2018, and the Gold Medal of the European Society of Radiology in 2019. She has additionally received honorary fellowships to the German Society of Interventional Radiology and Minimally Invasive Therapy (Deutsche Gesellschaft für Interventionelle Radiologie und Minimal-Invasive Therapie), the Seldinger Society of Interventional Radiology of Sweden, and the Société Française de Radiologie.
