= Herbert L. Abrams =

American physician

Herbert Leroy Abrams (August 16, 1920 – January 20, 2016) was an American medical doctor. After establishing a career as a radiologist at Harvard Medical School and the Stanford University School of Medicine, Abrams became involved in the anti-nuclear movement. He served on the national board of directors of Physicians for Social Responsibility and he was the founding vice president of International Physicians for the Prevention of Nuclear War (IPPNW).

== Biography ==
Abrams was born in Brooklyn. His parents, Morris and Freda Abrams, were Russian immigrants who ran a hardware store. He graduated from Cornell University and the Long Island College of Medicine.

Abrams was a faculty member at the Stanford University School of Medicine. He was then the Philip H. Cook Professor of Radiology at Harvard Medical School and was the chief radiologist at Brigham and Women's Hospital and Dana–Farber Cancer Center. He later returned to Stanford and became member-in-residence of the Center for International Security and Cooperation. "In the early 1960s, a lot of us were concerned about (nuclear bomb) testing in the atmosphere. Radiologists had to be concerned about that," he said later.

Co-founding International Physicians for the Prevention of Nuclear War (IPPNW), the organization that received the 1985 Nobel Peace Prize for its attempts to prevent nuclear war, Abrams served as the organization's first vice president. He was a longtime national board member for Physicians for Social Responsibility, and he had been a national co-chairman for the organization in the 1980s.

He was editor-in-chief of the journal Postgraduate Radiology and the founding editor-in-chief of CardioVascular and Interventional Radiology. Abrams wrote a textbook, Angiography (1961); in 2000, the fourth edition of the book was named Abrams' Angiography. Abrams was a founding fellow of the Society of Interventional Radiology (SIR), and he won an SIR Gold Medal in 2000. He was a member of the Institute of Medicine.

Abrams authored The President Has Been Shot: Confusion, Disability, and the 25th Amendment in the Aftermath of the Attempted Assassination of Ronald Reagan (1992). The book was reviewed favorably in The New England Journal of Medicine. In his leisure time, he played tennis. He continued to do so until a month before his death. He died in Palo Alto on January 20, 2016 at age 95.

== Selected publications from Bulletin of the Atomic Scientists ==
- Abrams, Herbert L. (1980). "Medical consequences of nuclear war". Bulletin of the Atomic Scientists. 36 (7): 15. Bibcode:1980BuAtS..36g..15A. doi:10.1080/00963402.1980.11458752.
- —— (1986). "Chernobyl: How radiation victims suffer". Bulletin of the Atomic Scientists. 43 (1): 13–17. doi:10.1080/00963402.1986.11459399.
- —— (1987). "Human instability and nuclear weapons". Bulletin of the Atomic Scientists. 43 (1): 34–39. Bibcode:1987BuAtS..43a..34A. doi:10.1080/00963402.1987.11459471.
