= Buda, Kortrijk =

Coordinates: 50°49′53″N 3°15′52″E

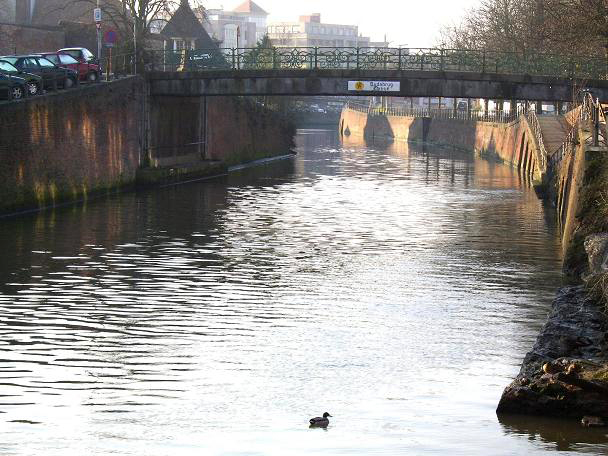
The old Budabridge over the River Leie (2010)

Buda is a historical neighbourhood in the Belgian city of Kortrijk. The neighbourhood is part of the historical old town. Since it lies between two branches of the River Leie, it is an island and is also called the 'Buda-island'.

== History and name ==
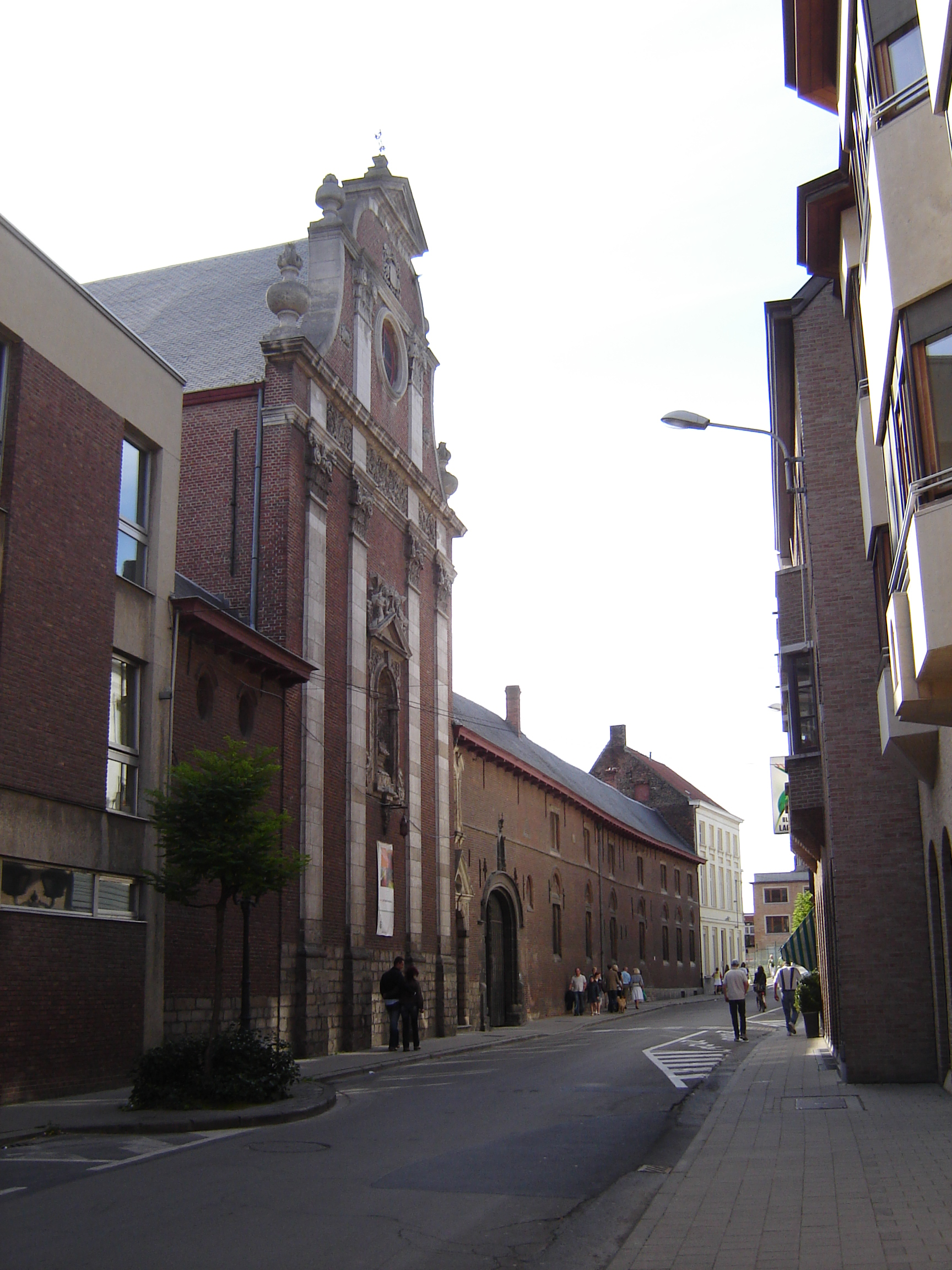
The Our Lady Hospital on Buda

Buda has been known as the area north of the River Leie for centuries. From 1454 onwards, Buda was incorporated within the city boundaries thanks to new ramparts. This stone wall around the city was 2.3 km long. The name Buda rose for the first time at the end of the 17th century. In 1686, the city of Buda in Hungary was conquered from the Turks. Compared to Pest, the upper town of Buda lies on the other side of the Danube. When Vauban in 1690 and 1698 developed the new fortifications around the Buda Island in Courtray, people said they had built a little Buda over here, near the existing Broel Towers. This name was kept alive among the inhabitants of the city and was found for the first times in the city archives in 1734. Later on, this name was given to the main street along the island. This Buda street (Budastraat in Dutch) is one of the oldest streets in town.

In this neighbourhood, the oldest hospital of the city was founded around 1200–1204, the so-called Hospital of Our Lady (Onze-Lieve-Vrouwehospitaal in Dutch). Initially, the ill people were taken care off by sisters and brothers of the order of the Cistercians, but later on, they oriented towards the rules of Saint Augustine. Nowadays, the hospital is part of the larger AZ Groeninge and is called campus Reepkaai.

Throughout its history, the neighbourhood has known many disasters. On 16 January 1826, a big fire in the inn 'De Carpel' caused severe damage. On 29 April 1865 the Felhoen-Pequeriau factory was burned to the ground and many other houses and the hospital were damaged. During the inundations of the Leie River in 1894 the whole Buda area was flooded. When the English Allies left the city in 1918 and 1940, they destroyed the bridges, which caused severe damage to the houses around it. During a friendly fire on 26 March 1944, 8 houses on the southern banks were destroyed and two people were killed.

From 1928 till 1958 there was an annual carnival in the whole neighbourhood which start every 14 August and lasts for three days.

During the first half of the 20th century, the Buda island was enlarged on the northern side, because the River Leie was moved in order to facilitate the passage of ships. In the beginning of the 21st century, the island was enlarged again. On the northern banks, a long plot of land was gained. This is now a park, called Budabeach, since it was converted into a beach with sand for use during the summer holidays. The western tip of the island was enlarged as well in 2008.

== Trivia ==
- On the Buda Island one can visit the Broel Museum, the museum of fine arts;
- Buda Island is famous for being a cultural spot in the city and its region, since it hosts a Budascoop (cinema), Buda Arts Centre, Buda Tower (were artists can reside) and a Buda Factory (exhibitions and creation).

== Literature ==
- Van Hoonacker, Egied, Duizende Kortrijkse straten. N.V. Vonksteen, Langemark, 1986, 591pp.
- Maddens, Niklaas, De geschiedenis van Kortrijk, Lannoo nv, Tielt, 1990, 544pp.
- Verstraete, Pieter-Jan; Vancolen, P., 2000 jaar Kortrijk, Waanders Uitgevers, Zwolle, 2008, 512pp.
