= Hospital Punta Pacifica =

Pacífica Salud

Geography
- Location: Panama City, Panama
- Coordinates: 8.981402°N 79.510104°W

Organisation
- Affiliated university: Johns Hopkins Medicine International

History
- Founded: 1999

Links
- Website: www.pacificasalud.com
- Lists: Hospitals in Panama

Pacifica Salud is a hospital in Panama City, Panama. It is the only hospital in Central America to be affiliated with Johns Hopkins Medicine International. Attracting medical tourism is a major component of its operating plan.
