= Budeni =

Budeni may refer to several villages in Romania:

- Budeni, a village in the town of Zlatna, Alba County
- Budeni, a village in Comana, Giurgiu
- Budeni, a village in the town of Dolhasca, Suceava County

== See also ==
- Buda (disambiguation)
- Budești (disambiguation)
