= Broel Museum =

Art museum in Belgium

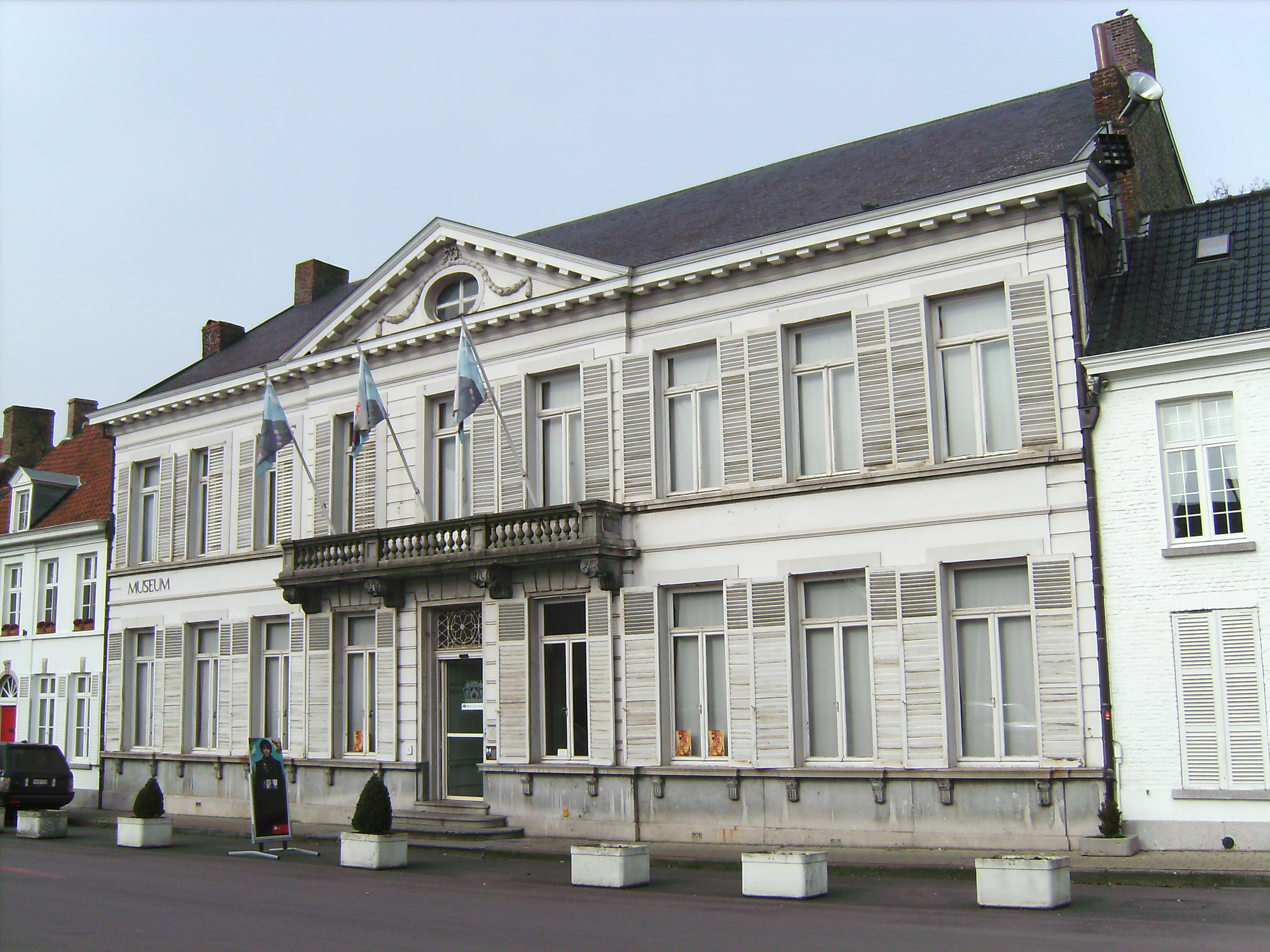
Building of the former Broel Museum

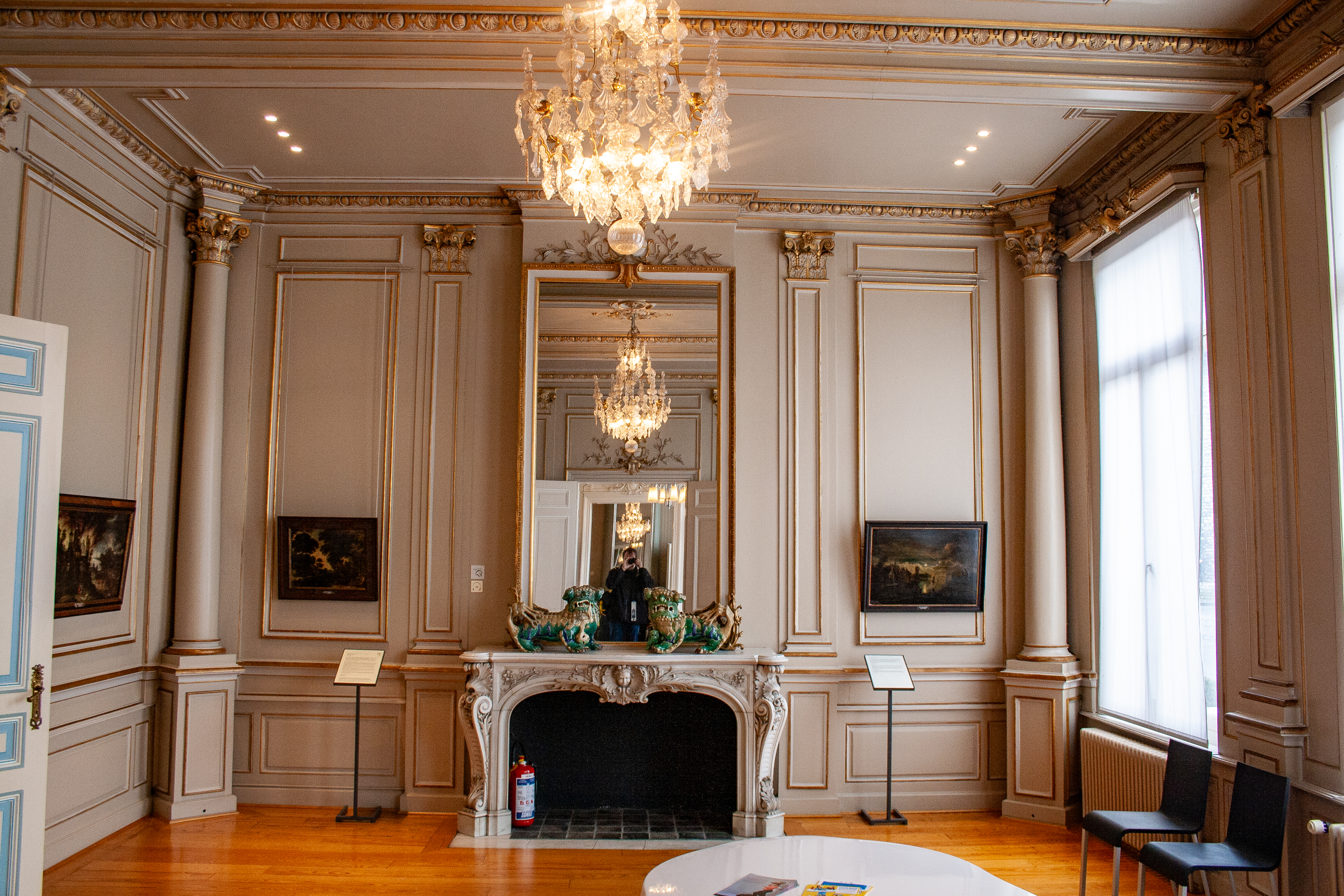
Broelmuseum interior

The Broel Museum (Broelmuseum) was an art museum, focusing on classical and applied arts of the 18th - 19th century. It was located on the Buda Island in Kortrijk, Belgium. The building was a converted 18th-century neoclassical mansion, located at 6 Broelkaai. The Treaty of Kortrijk was signed here in 1820. Since the end of 2014, the museum has closed its doors due to a lack of visitors. Under the name of 'Broelkaai 6', the location is being turned into a platform for visual arts, and is scheduled to reopen in 2018. It was the intention to merge the collection of the closed Broel Museum with that of the museum Kortrijk 1302 which is dedicated to the history of the Battle of the Golden Spurs.

== Exhibits ==
The main focus of the museum was works of artists from the Kortrijk area, or who are currently living in Kortijk, including; Roelant Savery, Jacob Savery, Karel van Mander, Kerstiaen De Keuninck, Louis-Pierre Verwee, Évariste Carpentier, Louis Robbe, Edward Woutermaertens, Vincent De Vos with a prominence of art from the 16th and 19th centuries.

The collection is the property of the Kortrijk City Museums. Part of this collection will be on display in the form of alternating exhibitions at the new Abby Kortrijk Museum, which opened in March 2025 in the renovated buildings and a new extension of the Groeninge Abbey in Kortrijk.

== Gallery of works ==
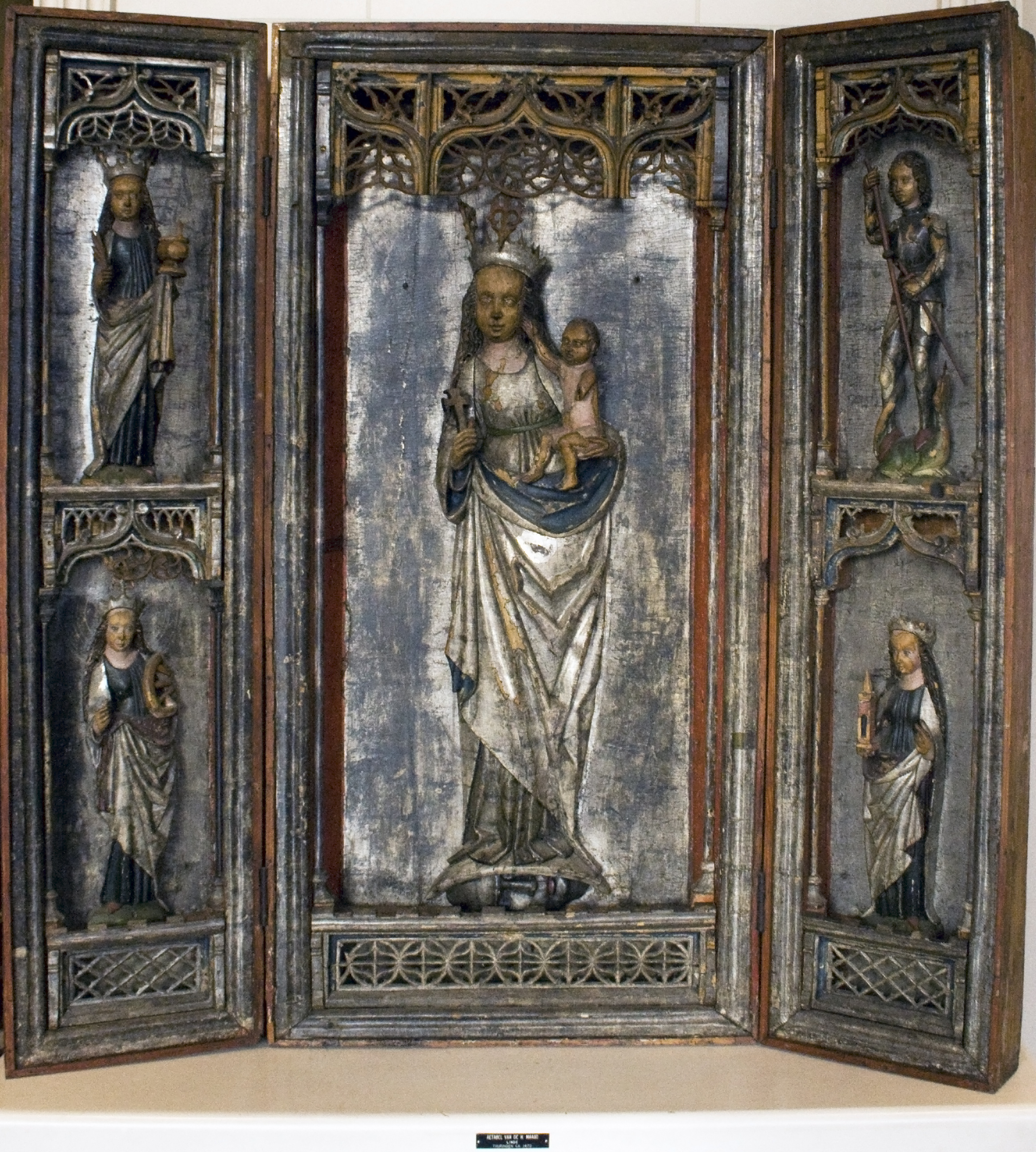
Triptych of Virgin Mary with Elisabeth of Hungary (1470)

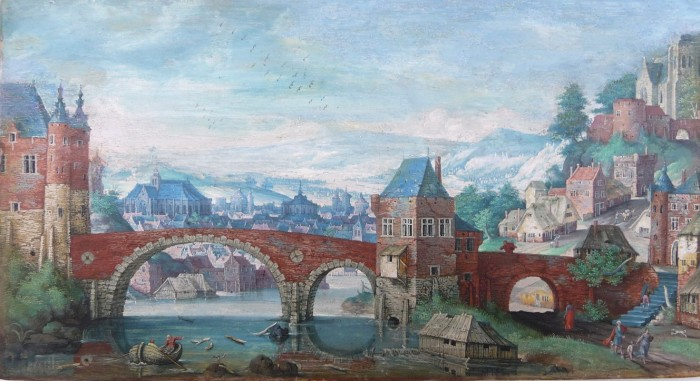
Hagar and Ishmael by Jacob Savery (1585)

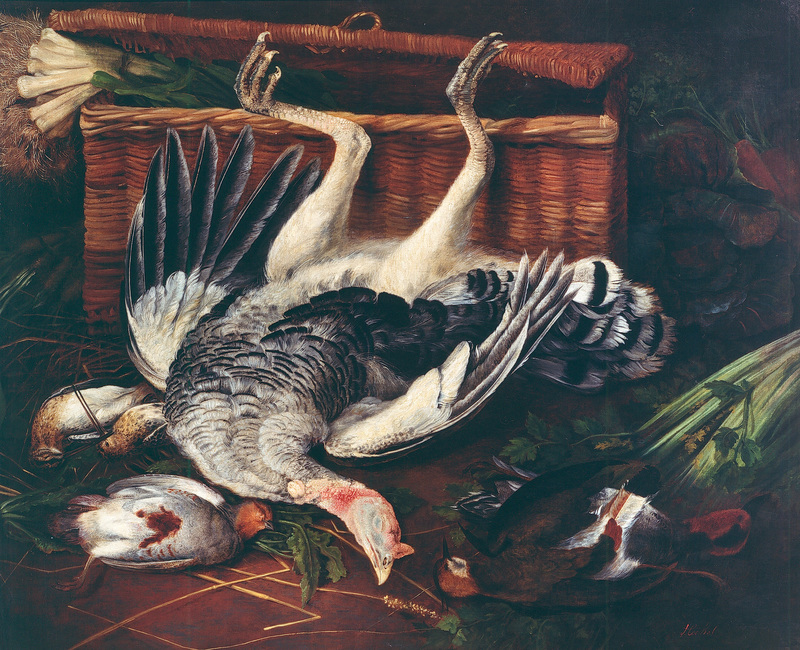
Fowl and vegetables by Adriaen van Utrecht (1620-1652)

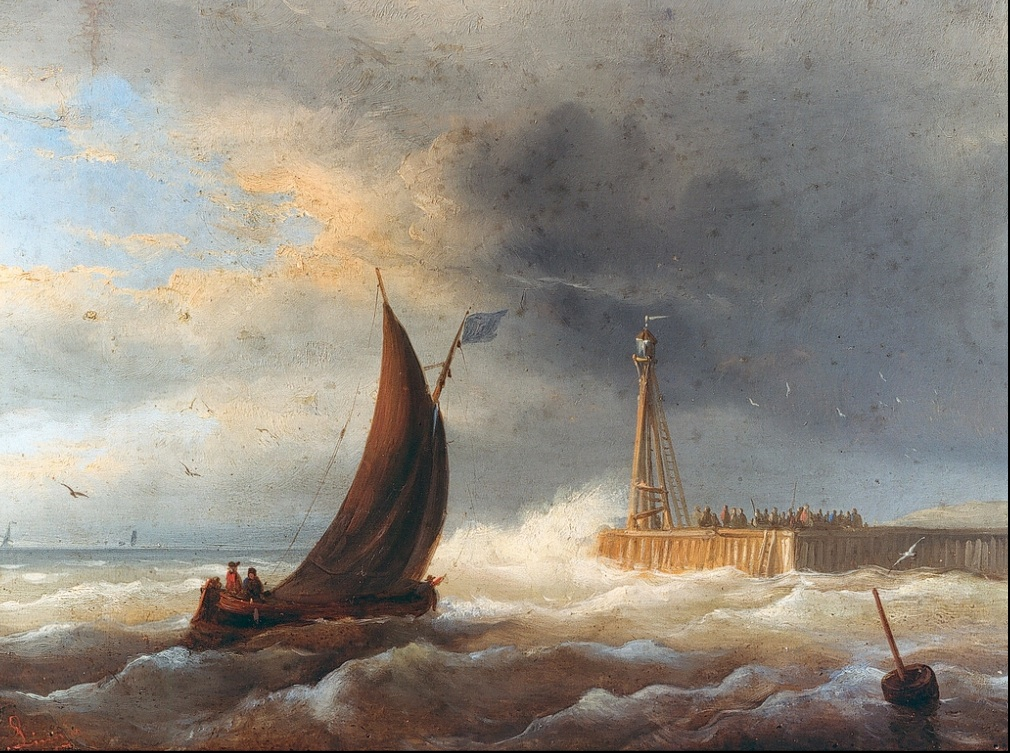
Entering the harbour by Egide Linnig (mid-19th century)

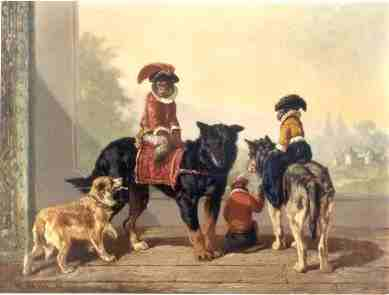
The Fox (1860s) by Vincent De Vos

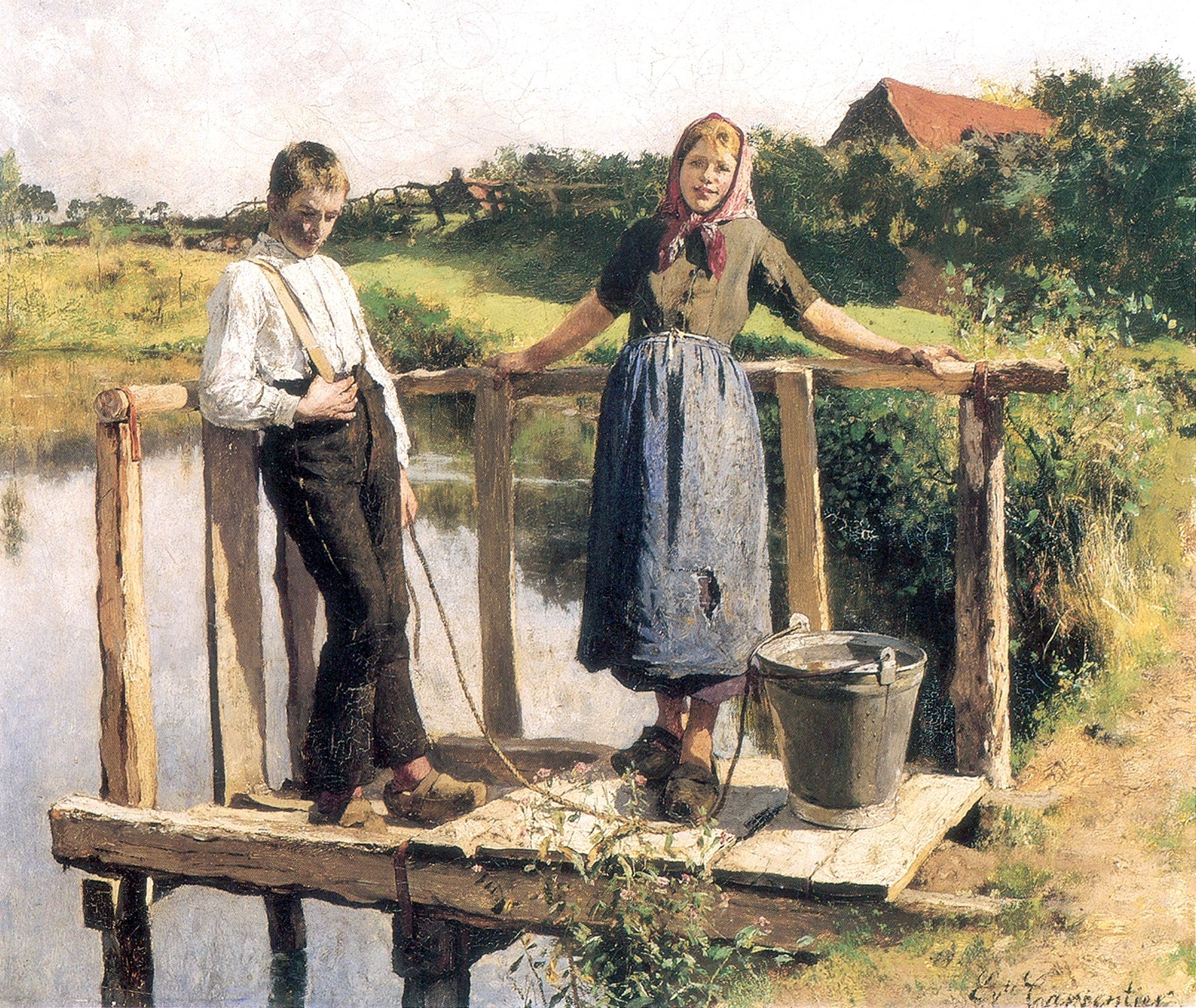
An Intimate Conversation by Évariste Carpentier (c. 1892)
