= Belgium–France border =

International border

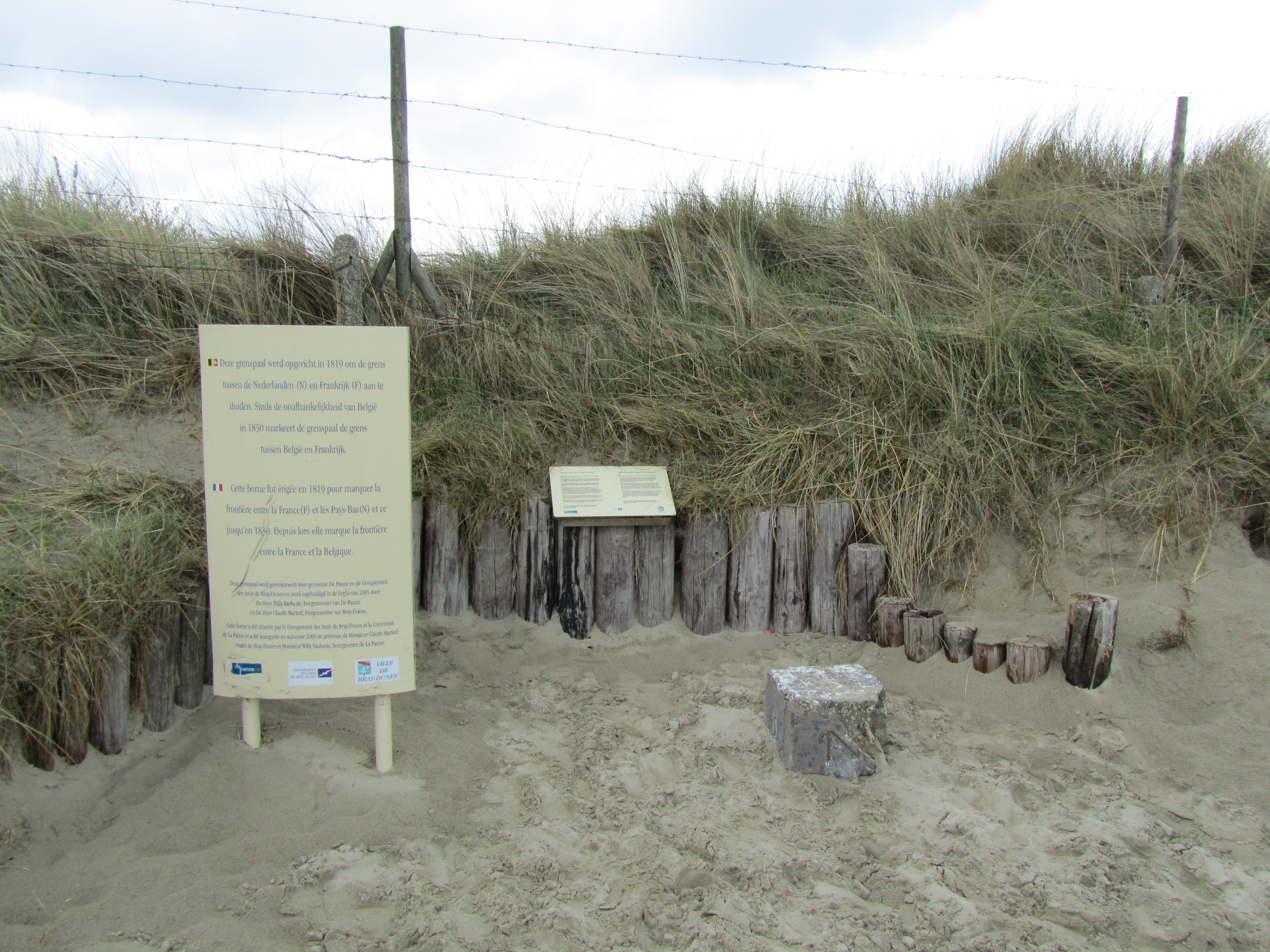
- Border fence between Belgium and France

Characteristics
- Entities: Belgium France
- Length: 620 kilometers (390 mi)

History
- Current shape: 1839

The Belgium–France border, or more commonly the Franco-Belgian border, separates France and Belgium and is 620 km (390 mi) long. Part of it is defined by the Lys river. The western end is at the North Sea (51°5′22″N 2°32′43″E near De Panne and Bray-Dunes). The eastern end is at the Belgium-France-Luxembourg tripoint (at 49°32′46″N 5°49′5″E near Athus and Mont-Saint-Martin). The straight distance between these points is 289 km (180 mi).

Since 1995, Belgium and France have been parts of the Schengen Area. This means there are no permanent border controls at this border, but there have been temporary controls.

== Provinces and Departments ==
The Belgian side of the border is shared by, from north to south, the provinces of West Flanders (Flemish Region) and Hainaut, Namur and Luxembourg (Walloon Region).

The French side of the border is shared by, from north to south, the departments of Nord and Aisne (region of Hauts-de-France) and Ardennes, Meuse and Meurthe-et-Moselle (region of Grand Est).

== History ==
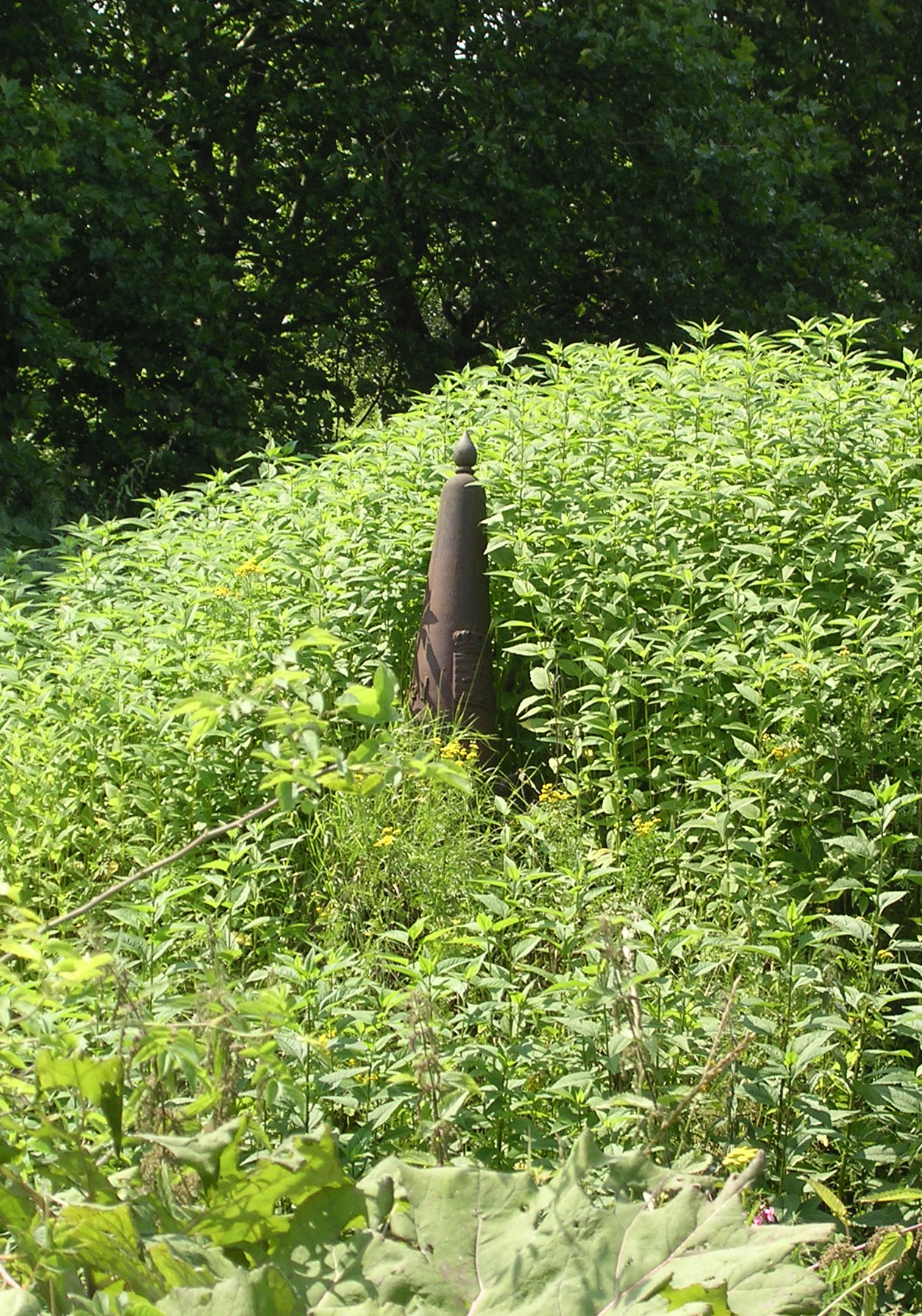
Belgium–France–Luxembourg tripoint

The limits of the border are outlined in the 1820 Treaty of Kortrijk, agreed between France and the then-United Kingdom of the Netherlands. Belgium inherited the border upon its independence, which consists of a number of border posts. Maintenance of and disputes concerning the border are managed by a mixed Franco-Belgian border delimitation commission, which is convened when required. A commission was convened in 2000 concerning the maintenance of the border posts between France and the Belgian province of West Flanders.

In April 2021, one of the border stones in Bousignies-sur-Roc was found to have been moved by a few metres. A farmer was presumed to have moved it to enlarge his field, but the person responsible was not identified.

== See also ==
- Belgium–France relations
- French Community of Belgium
