= Anadolu Medical Center =

- Shown in Turkey

Geography
- Location: Turkey
- Coordinates: 40.81911°N 29.35351°E

Organisation
- Affiliated university: Johns Hopkins Medicine International

Services
- Beds: 268

History
- Founded: February 12, 2005

Links
- Website: http://www.anadolumedicalcenter.com https://www.anadolumedicalcenter.fr

Anadolu Medical Center (Turkish: Anadolu Sağlık Merkezi) is a hospital in Gebze, Kocaeli, Turkey. It is located in Çayırova on the highway D.100 at the Bayramoğlu exit, close to Sabiha Gökçen International Airport. Established by the Anadolu Foundation, the hospital was built on 186,000 m^{2} (2,000,000 ft^{2}) of land and opened on February 12, 2005. It consists of 209 beds, 59 intensive care beds and 8 operating rooms. The parking lot is capable of 350 cars. The medical center was initially established as a specialized cancer center but then it transformed into a multidisciplinary hospital. Anadolu is one of the most popular centers of bone marrow transplantation BMT in the Mediterranean, capable of performing up to 22 stem cell transplants simultaneously.

It has ISO 9001–2000 (Quality Management System), ISO 14001 (Environment Management System), OHSAS 18001 (Work Health and Safety) and JCI (Joint Commission International) certifications. The hospital is affiliated with the Johns Hopkins Hospital in the United States through Johns Hopkins Medicine International.

IMRT and Cyberknife are two of the latest technologies used in cancer treatment developed at the Anadolu Medical Center. The hospital also provides multidisciplinary care, free check ups, patient education, first aid courses, and courses related to preventive medicine. Its cancer centre is an OECI-designated clinical cancer centre.

Anadolu Medical Center has outpatient clinics in Istanbul at Ataşehir .
