= Treaty of Kortrijk =

1820 treaty between France and the Netherlands

The border between the United Kingdom of the Netherlands and France as laid down in the Kortrijk treaty.

The Treaty of Kortrijk (Dutch: Verdrag van Kortrijk) was signed the 28 March 1820 in the current Museum of Arts Broelmuseum in the Belgian city of Kortrijk. This treaty laid out the boundaries between France and the United Kingdom of the Netherlands (under the reign of King William I of the Netherlands). Belgium inherited the border upon its independence from the Netherlands in 1830. Nowadays, those boundaries still stand, with some minor corrections, as the official border between Belgium and France and between Luxembourg and France.

Prior to the treaty, border markers were set up on the border between France and the Nederlands in 1819. The Treaty stipulates that if a debate on boundaries is needed, a committee of representatives from France and Belgium will discuss it, but meetings have not been held since 1930.

In 2021, the treaty was inadvertently violated when a disgruntled Belgian farmer, annoyed that one of the border markers was in the way of his tractor, moved the stone seven feet (2.2 metres) into French territory and enlarged not only his land but the entire country of Belgium. The mayors of the neighbouring French and Belgian villages took the encroachment good-naturedly, and the farmer was issued with a letter ordering that the stone be moved back to its original position.

== See also ==
- Congress of Vienna (1814/15)
- Austrian Netherlands
