= Organisation of European Cancer Institutes =

International non-profit organization

The Organisation of European Cancer Institutes (OECI) is an international non-profit organization with European Economic Interest Grouping status. It was created in 1979 to promote greater cooperation among European cancer centers and institutes. Its head office is located in Brussels at the Belgian University Foundation.

== Background ==
The OECI is the main European network of accredited cancer centers on the continent. The OECI relies on a network of almost 100 institutions all over Europe, to ensure cancer patients are provided with the specialized healthcare for their type of cancer. Similar to the NCI's network of designated comprehensive cancer centres, the OECI developed the Accreditation and Designation Program in order to improve organization and teamwork between cancer centres across Europe. In 2017, the OECI program obtained ISQua Accreditation ISQua is the umbrella organization responsible for the Joint Commission International accreditation.

The OECI plays a role in helping EU Member State authorities to organize their cancer healthcare systems.

== In figures ==
- Membership across Europe, as well as a few major centres from South America and Southeast Asia
- 121 members
- Membership categories: members undergoing accreditation and designation (A&D; 60); accredited and designated cancer centre; and accredited and designated comprehensive cancer centre; other members
- 4 working groups: accreditation and designation programme, biobanks and molecular pathobiology, supportive and palliative care, cancer economics and benchmarking, collaboration for good practices with patients, cancer outcomes research
- 10 scientific papers/articles

== OECI-designated Comprehensive cancer centers ==
- Belgium (1):
  - Institut Jules Bordet (IJB) (Brussels)
- Finland (1):
  - Department of Oncology / Comprehensive Cancer Centre at Helsinki University Central Hospital (HUCH) (Helsinki)
- France (6):
  - Centre Francois Baclesse (Caen)
  - Centre Léon-Bérard (Lyon)
  - Institut Curie, Curie Institute (Paris)
  - Institut Gustave Roussy (Paris)
  - Institut Paoli-Calmettes, (Marseille)
  - Institut Universitaire du Cancer Toulouse Oncopole (Toulouse)
- Hungary (1):
  - Országos Onkológiai Intézet or National Institute of Oncology (Budapest)
- Ireland (1):
  - Trinity St James's Cancer Institute, St. James's Hospital (Dublin)
- Italy (9):
  - Centro di Riferimento Oncologico at Istituto Nazionale Tumori (Aviano)
  - European Institute of Oncology (Milan)
  - Istituto Nazionale Tumori -IRCCS "Fondazione G.Pascale" (INT-Pascale) (Napoli)
  - Regina Elena National Cancer Institute (IRE) (Rome)
  - Azienda Unità Sanitaria Locale di Reggio Emilia - IRCCS (Reggio Emilia)
  - IRCCS Azienda Ospedaliera Universitaria San Martino - IST- Istituto Nazionale per la Ricerca sul Cancro (Genova)
  - Fondazione IRCCS- Istituto Nazionale dei Tumori di Milano (Milano)
  - Istituto Oncologico Veneto IRCCS-IOV (Padova)
  - IRCCS Istituto Clinico Humanitas (Milano)
- Norway (1):
  - Oslo University Hospital (Oslo)
- Portugal (1):
  - Instituto Português de Oncologia Francisco Gentil, IPO-Porto (Porto)
- Netherlands (3):
  - Maastricht University Medical Centre, (Maastricht)
  - Netherlands Cancer Institute (Amsterdam)
  - Universitair Medisch Centrum Groningen (UMCG), (Groningen)
- Sweden (4):
  - Karolinska Institute and University Hospital, (Stockholm)
  - Skåne University Hospital Comprehensive Cancer Centre, (Lund)
  - Sahlgrenska Comprehensive Cancer Centre, Gothenburg)
  - Linköping University Hospital Cancer Center (Linköping)
- United Kingdom (3):
  - The Christie NHS Foundation Trust (Manchester)
  - Cambridge Cancer Centre (see also Department of Oncology, University of Cambridge) (Cambridge)
  - King's Health Partners Integrated Cancer Centre, King's College London (London)

== OECI-designated cancer centers ==
- Belgium (1):
  - Kortrijk Cancer Centre at AZ Groeninge (Kortrijk)
- Czech Republic (1):
  - Masarykův onkologický ústav at Masaryk Memorial Cancer Institute (BRNO)
- Denmark (1):
  - Velje Cancer Centre at Lillebaelt Hospital (Velje)
- Estonia (1):
  - Sihtasutus Tartu Ülikooli Kliinikum, Tartu University Hospital (Tartu)
- Finland (3):
  - Turku University Hospital Cancer Centre, (Turku)
  - Tampere University Hospital, (Tampere)
  - Kuopio University Hospital, Kuopio
- Ireland (1):
  - Beaumont RCSI Cancer Centre, Beaumont Hospital (Dublin)
- Italy (3):
  - Istituto Tumori Giovanni Paolo II, Istituto di Ricovero e Cura a Carattere Scientifico (Bari)
  - IRCCS, Centro di Riferimento Oncologico della Basilicata (CROB) (Rionero in Vulture)
  - Azienda Unità Sanitaria Locale di Reggio Emilia - IRCCS Istituto in Tecnologie Avanzate e Modelli Assistenziali in Oncologia (Reggio Emilia)
- Lithuania (1):
  - National Cancer Institute (Vilnius)
- Portugal (2):
  - Instituto Português de Oncologia Francisco Gentil, E.P.E. (IPO-Lisbon) (Lisbon)
  - Instituto Português de Oncologia Francisco Gentil, IPO-Coimbra (Coimbra)
- Romania (1):
  - The “Prof. Dr. Ion Chiricuta” Institute of Oncology (IOCN) (Cluj Cluj-Napoca)
- Slovenia (1)
  - Institute of Oncology Ljubljana (Ljubljana)
- Spain (1):
  - Fundación Instituto Valenciano de Oncología or Valencia Oncology Institute Foundation (IVO) (Valencia)
- Turkey (1):
  - Anadolu Sağlık Merkezi or Anadolu Medical Center (Kocaeli)

== OECI members, currently in the accreditation process ==
- Belgium (1):
  - Leuven Kanker Instituut (LKI) /UZ Leuven, KU Leuven, (Leuven)
- Finland (2):
  - Cancer Center of Kuopio University Hospital, (Kuopio)
  - Oulu University Hospital or Oulun Yliopistollinen Sairaala (Oulu)
- France (1):
  - APHP-CARPEM Institute, Paris
  - Institut de Cancérologie de l'Ouest (ICO), Saint Herblain Cedex
  - Association Toulousaine d’Oncologie Publique (ATOP), Toulouse cedex 9
- Ireland (1):
  - Beaumont Hospital, Dublin
- Spain (1):
  - Vall d’Hebron Barcelona Campus Hospitalari, Vall d'Hebron University Hospital, Barcelona
- Sweden (2):
  - Skånes Universitetssjukhus, Lund
  - Sahlgrenska University Hospital, Göteborg
- Netherlands (1):
  - University Medical Center Groningen, Comprehensive Cancer Center (UMCG-CCC), Groningen
- Slovenia (1):
  - Onkološki Inštitut Ljubljana, Ljubljana

== OECI members, not (yet) participating in the accreditation process ==
- Austria (3):
  - Comprehensive Cancer Center Graz, Graz
  - Comprehensive Cancer Center Vienna, Vienna
  - Zentrum für Tumorerkrankungen, Linz, Onkologisches Leitspital für Oberösterreich, The Sisters of Charity Clinical Cancer Center, Linz (SCCCC)(Linz)
- Belgium (2):
  - Institut Roi Albert II /King Albert II Cancer Institute, Cliniques universitaires Saint-Luc, (Brussels)
- Croatia (1): Klinika za tumore Klinicki bolnicki centar Sestre milosrdnice at University Hospital for Tumors, Sisters of Charity Hospital (Zagreb)
- Czech Republic (1):
  - Institute of Biostatistics and Analyses, Faculty of Medicine and Faculty of Science, Masaryk University, BRNO
- Denmark (1):
  - Danish Cancer Society Research Center, Copenhagen
- Estonia (1):
  - North Estonia Medical Centre, (Tallinn)
- France (3):
  - Centre de Lutte Contre le Cancer Paul Strauss, (Strasbourg)
  - Comprehensive Cancer Center Jean Perrin, Clermond-Ferrand
  - Centre Henri Becquerel, (Rouen)
- Germany (3):
  - Deutsches Krebsforschungszentrum (DKFZ), German Cancer Research Center, (Heidelberg)
  - Universitäts KrebsCentrum Dresden, University Cancer Center Dresden, (Dresden)
  - Charité Comprehensive Cancer Center, (Berlin)
- Hungary (1):
  - Országos Korányi TBC és Pulmonológiai Intézet, National Korányi Institute of Tb and Pulmonology, (Budapest)
- Italy (8):
  - Ospedale San Raffaele (OSR), (Milano)
  - European School of Oncology (ESO), (Milano)
  - Fondazione IFOM, - FIRC Institute of Molecular Oncology, (Milano)
  - Istituto Scientifico Romagnolo per lo Studio e la Cura dei Tumori [IRST]-IRCCS, (eldola- Forlì)
  - Candiolo Cancer Institute FPO-IRCCS, (Candiolo-Torino)
  - IRCCS - Istituto di Ricerche Farmacologiche Mario Negri, (Milano)
  - Ente Ospedaliero Ospedali Galliera, (Genova)
  - Istituto Dermatologico S. Gallicano, S.Gallicano Dermatological Institute, (Roma)
- Poland (1):
  - Wielkopolskie Centrum Onkologii, Greater Poland Cancer Center, Poznan
- Romania (1):
  - SC RTC Radiology Therapeutic Center Amethyst Radiotherapy, Otopeni Ilfov County
- Russia (3):
  - Tatarstan Cancer Center “TCC”, (Kazan)
  - N.N.Blokhin Russian Cancer Research Centre, (Moscow)
  - National Medical Research Radiological Centre (NMRRC), (Moscow)
- Serbia (1):
  - Oncology Institute of Vojvodina, (Sremska Kamenica)
- Slovakia (1):
  - Ústav experimentálnej onkológie SAV, (Bratislava)
- Slovenia (1)
  - Institute of Oncology Ljubljana, (Ljubljana)
- Spain(1)
  - Catalan Institute of Oncology, (Barcelona)
- Sweden (2):
  - Uppsala University Hospital, (Uppsala)
  - Skane University Hospital, South Sweden Cancer Centre, (Lund)
- Netherlands (3):
  - Erasmus MC Cancer Institute, (Rotterdam)
  - Netherlands Comprehensive Cancer Organisation, (Utrecht)
  - Radboudumc Centre for Oncology, (Nijmegen)
  - Rijnstate, (Arnhem)
- Turkey (1):
  - Dokuz Eylül University, Instıtute of Oncology, (Izmir)
- Ukraine (1):
  - RE Kavetsky Institute of Experimental Pathology, Oncology and Radiobiology of National Academy of Sciences of Ukraine, (IEPOR) (Kyiv)
- United Kingdom (1):
  - Imperial College Healthcare NHS Trust, London
