= AZ Groeninge =

Coordinates: 50°48′4″N 3°15′55″E

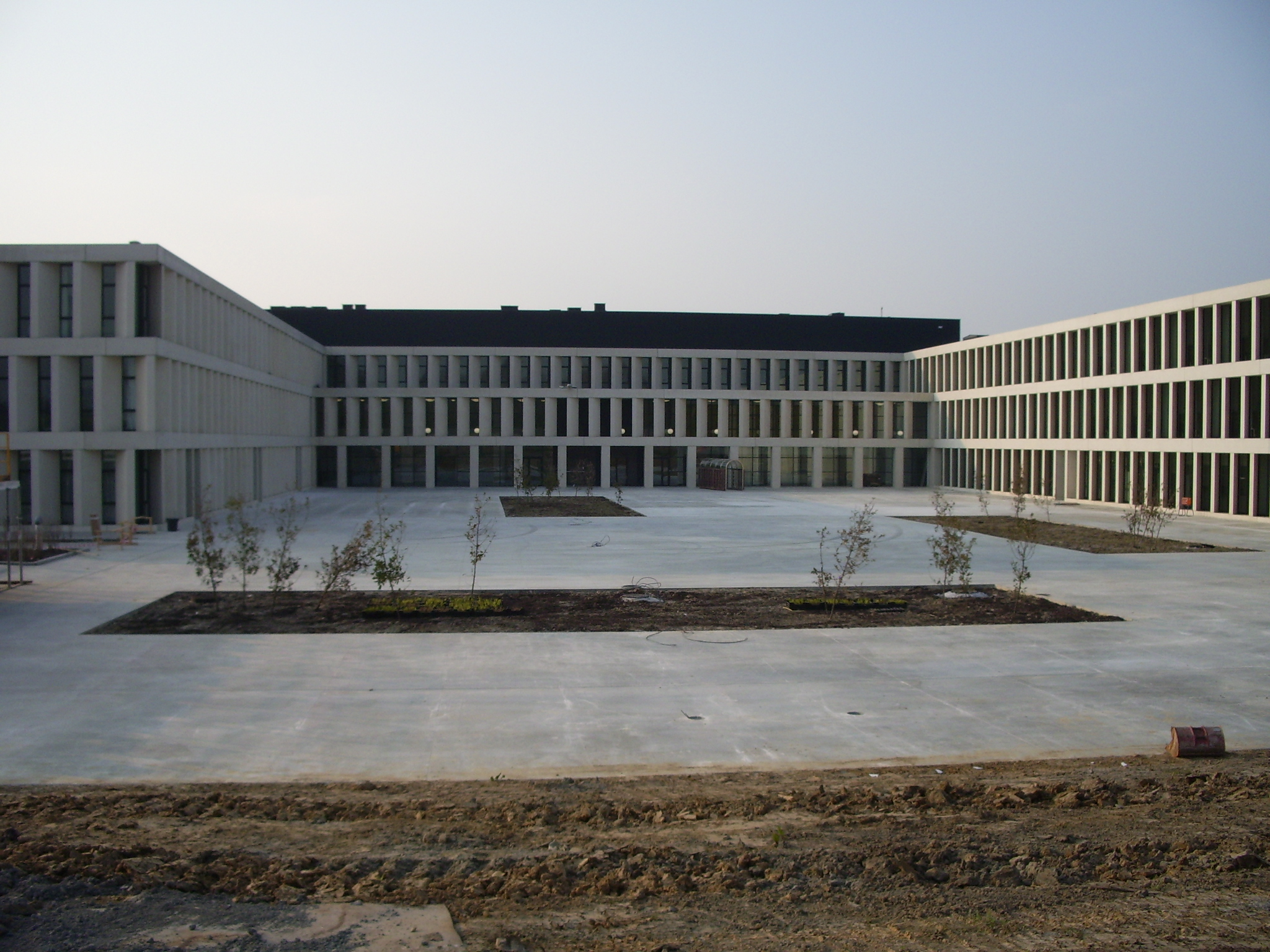
- Hospital entrance in April 2010

Geography
- Location: Kortrijk, Belgium

Organisation
- Type: Teaching Hospital
- Affiliated university: KULAK & Université Lille Nord de France

Services
- Emergency department: Yes Accident & Emergency
- Beds: 1066

History
- Founded: 1211 & 2003

Links
- Lists: Hospitals in Belgium
- Other links: List of hospitals in Belgium

AZ Groeninge is a large teaching hospital, affiliated with the Flemish KU Leuven Hospital network, in Kortrijk, West Flanders, Belgium. The hospital is the result of a merger of four hospitals in Kortrijk and is in number of beds, in its current form, the fifth largest hospital system in Belgium. The new 1000+ hospital bed facility at the Kennedylaan, opened in 2017, is one of the largest hospital sites in Belgium. In 2023 Newsweek ranked az groeninge 6th best hospital in Belgium and first non-academic hospital.

== History ==
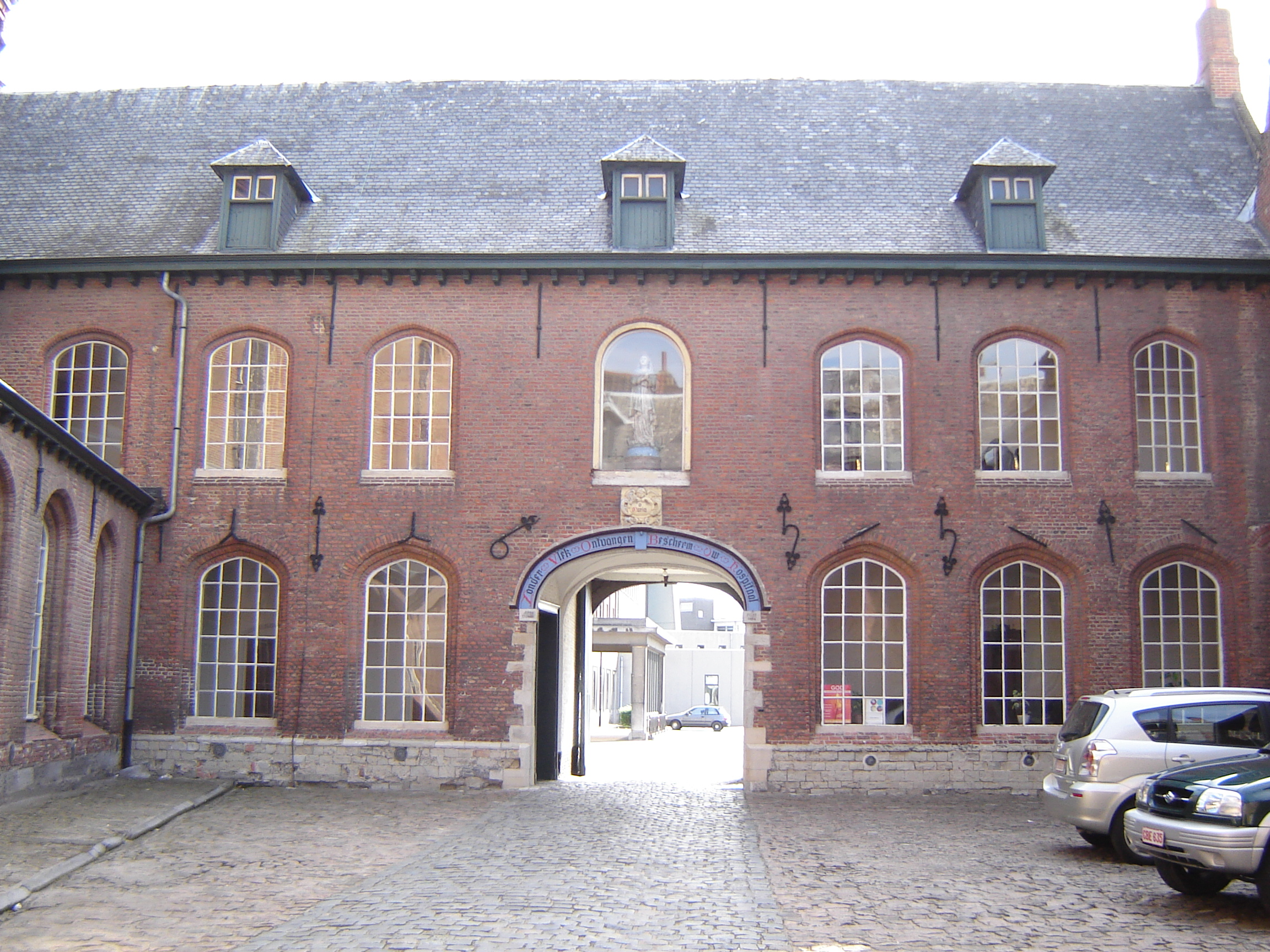
View of the 17th century court of the Augustinian monastery of the campus Reepkaai (dedicated to Our Lady) of AZ Groeninge and its predecessor Onze-Lieve-Vrouwehospitaal

In 2003, four hospitals in the Belgian city of Kortrijk merged: Kliniek Maria's Voorzienigheid (founded in 1937), Onze-Lieve-Vrouwehospitaal (1211), Sint-Niklaasziekenhuis (1958) and Sint-Maartenziekenhuis (1955). This resulted in a single hospital with a non-profit status as it is a public–private partnership between the City of Kortrijk and the Boards of the former Christian hospitals. With the merger all specialties were effectively centralized at one campus. In 2005 the construction of one large hospital facility in the neighbourhood of "het Ei in Kortrijk" started. Between 2010 and 2016 the campuses of Sint-Niklaas, Sint-Maarten and Maria's Voorzienigheid moved into the new hospital. The historic campus of the Medieval Our Lady Hospital will remain open longer, to accommodate administrative services and prolonged-care units such as the palliative care unit, but the ultimate aim is to also relocate these services to the Kennedylaan.

== Facts ==
AZ Groeninge has a history that dates back to the beginning of the 13th century and is one of the oldest hospitals in Belgium. It is a pluralistic hospital resulting from the merger of one public hospital and 3 private Catholic hospitals. AZ Groeninge is in number of beds (1100 acute beds; 57 obstetric beds) the fifth largest hospital in the country (only the UZ of the KU Leuven, the Grand Hôpital de Charleroi, the ZiekenhuisNetwerk Antwerpen and AZ Sint-Jan Brugge-Oostende AV are larger). However, the latter three are in fact hospital systems (most services are not centralised at one campus). AZ Groeninge is a teaching hospital that accommodates training of medical and nursing students and residents and clinical fellows in various specialties.

AZ Groeninge is a large private employer in the Arrondissement of Kortrijk and Eurodistrict Lille–Kortrijk–Tournai metropolitan area. As of 2009, it employed 1038 full-time en 1642 part-time people, 200+ of which are physicians. It is a non-profit organisation (VZW/ASBL). In 2009 AZ Groeninge was responsible for the education of 30 residents and fellows. It had 1,094 beds, 33,920 inpatient admissions a year, 2,020 births and had 38,838 emergency department visits in 2009.

== Facilities and current operations ==
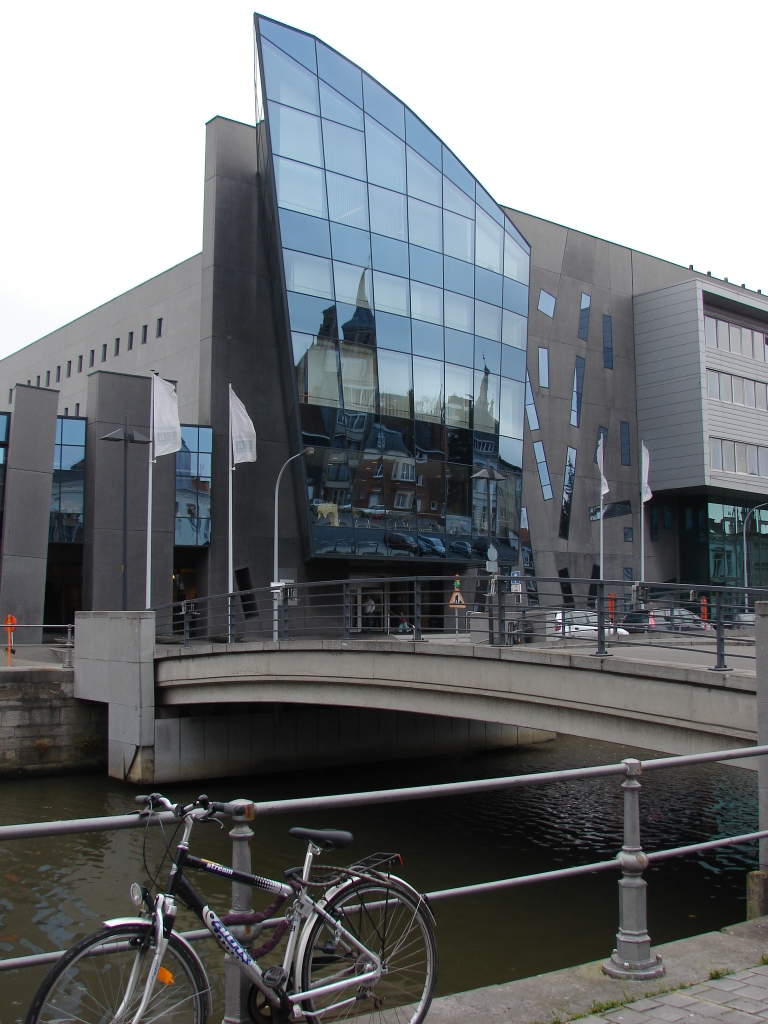
The campus Onze-Lieve-Vrouw of AZ Groeninge

Before 2017 the hospital consisted of 4 hospital sites: Kennedylaan, Loofstraat, Burgemeester Vercruysselaan and Reepkaai. Since 2017 all acute operations were centralised in a single hospital site. This hospital site is one of the largest in the country. The Kennedylaan site is located close to the campuses of the Catholic University of Leuven Campus Kortrijk (KULAK) and VIVES University College. The hospital accommodates several specialized facilities and services such as the Kortrijk Cancer Centre, an accredited OECI-designated clinical cancer centre, robotic surgery (da Vinci Surgical System), Radiofrequency ablation, an Eusoma-accredited Breast Clinic, a Fertility center, a Radiotherapy unit (also offering intra-hepatic radiotherapy or TheraSphere treatment and Intraoperative radiation therapy or IORT), a Clinical Cancer Center with several multidisciplinary oncology clinics and access to Hypothermia caps, 2 MRIs including one 3.0 tesla MRI, the West-Flanders PET-CT center, a clinical trials and research units that allow participation in many phases 1 to 4 clinical trials and with capacity to design clinical trials and ability to serve as national leading ethical committee. The Kortrijk Cancer Centre is a member of the Organisation of European Cancer Institutes (OECI). In 2012 the Leuven UZ Leuven University Hospital KWS Electronic medical record system was implemented. The closest NMBS stop to the main campus is Kortrijk railway station. The closest airports are Kortrijk-Wevelgem International Airport, Lille Airport and Brussels Airport. The closest international railway station is Lille-Europe. The Alderman for Social Affairs of the City of Kortrijk (and former MEP), Philippe De Coene, serves currently as President of AZ Groeninge. Mrs. Inge Buyse succeeded Mr. Jan Deleu in 2016 as CEO of AZ Groeninge.

== Affiliated institutions ==
AZ Groeninge is part of the Vlaams Ziekenhuisnetwerk van het Universitair Ziekenhuis van de K.U.Leuven. In 2008 an agreement was signed between the hospital, the Kortrijk University (Catholic University of Leuven Campus Kortrijk) and the University & University Hospital of Lille (Université Lille Nord de France) to stimulate collaborations within the Eurometropole Lille-Kortrijk-Tournai. There is also collaboration with VIVES University College and Ghent University (Hospital). The hospital participates actively in many clinical trials. Many physicians are members of collaborative groups such as EORTC. It participates in regional managed care networks with neighbouring hospitals such as the Onze-Lieve-Vrouw van Lourdesziekenhuis in Waregem, the Jan Ypermanziekenhuis in Ypres, and the hospitals in Mouscron en Tournai, and the AZ Sint-Jan Brugge-Oostende AV in Bruges. Recently the E17 hospital network was founded and includes AZ Maria Middelares St Jozef (Gent), AZ OLV Loures (Waregem), Jan Yperman Ziekenhuis (Ypres), St Jozef Kliniek (Izegem), St Vincentius (Deinze), AZ Glorieux (Ronse), AZ St Elisabeth (Zottegem) and AZ Groeninge (Kortrijk).

== See also ==
- List of hospitals in Belgium
- Healthcare in Belgium
