= Cornetu =

- Commune
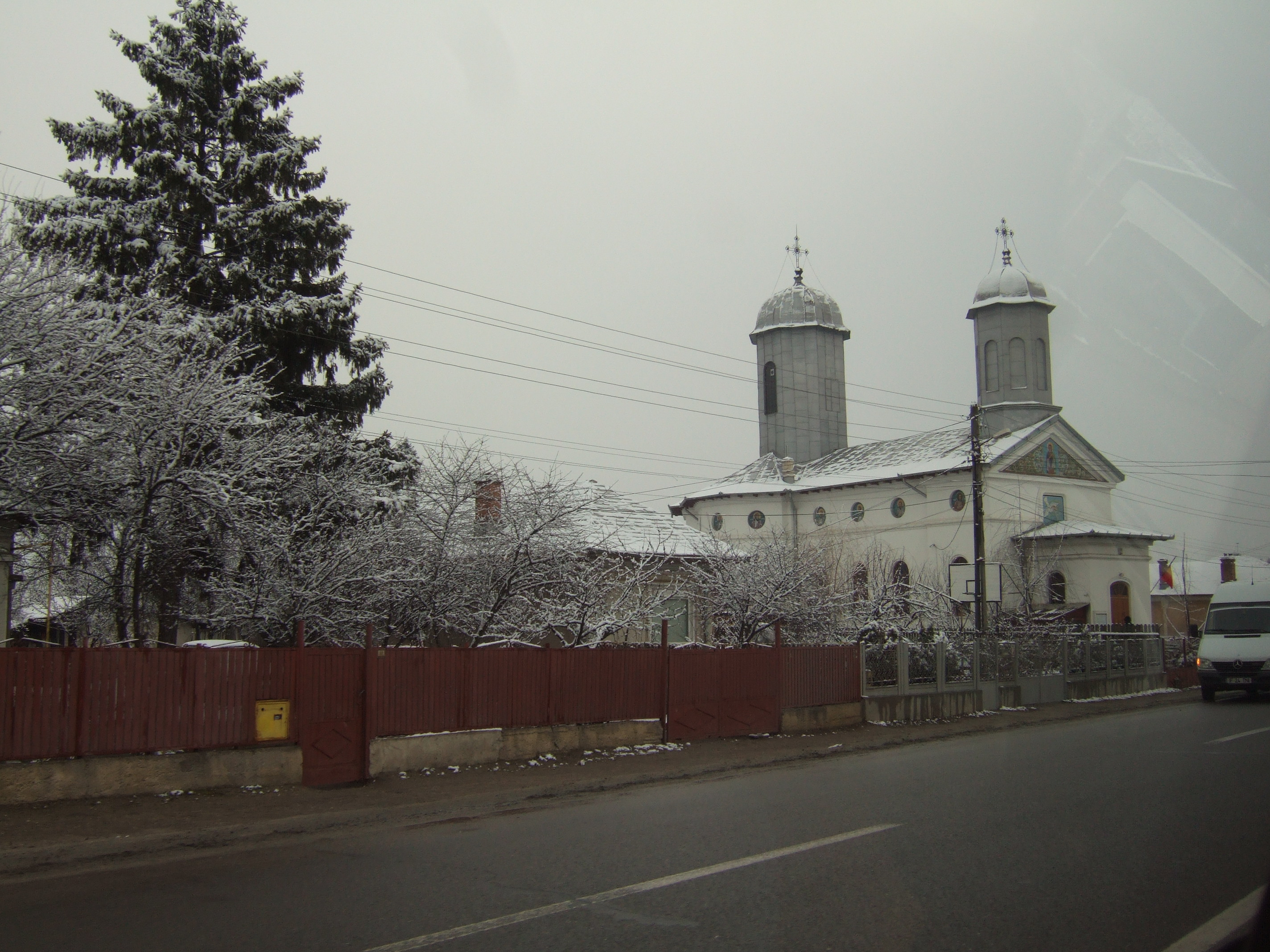
- Church in Cornetu

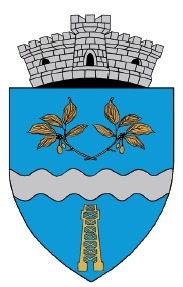
- Coat of arms

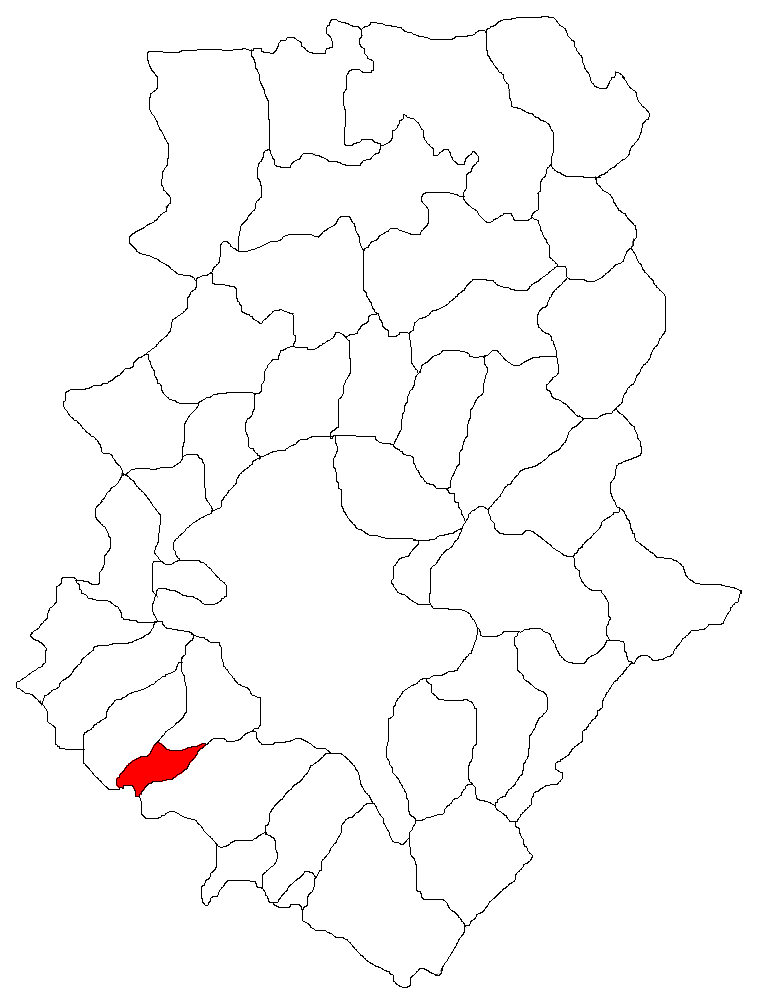
- Location in Ilfov County

- Location in Romania
- Coordinates: 44°21′N 25°57′E
- Country: Romania
- County: Ilfov

Government
  - Mayor (2020–2024): Adrian Eduard Stoica (PNL)
- Area: 17.12 km^{2} (6.61 sq mi)
- Elevation: 77 m (253 ft)
- Population (2021-12-01): 7,389
  - Density: 431.6/km^{2} (1,118/sq mi)
- Time zone: UTC+02:00 (EET)
  - Summer (DST): UTC+03:00 (EEST)
- Postal code: 77070
- Area code: +(40) 21
- Vehicle reg.: IF
- Website: www.primariacornetu.ro

Cornetu is a commune in the south-west of Ilfov County, Muntenia, Romania. In Romanian, its name signifies a forest of European Cornel (Cornus mas) trees. It is composed of two villages, Buda and Cornetu.

Historical population
Year	Pop.	±%
2002	5,028	—
2011	6,324	+25.8%
2021	7,389	+16.8%
Source: Census data
