= Broeltowers =

Broel Towers
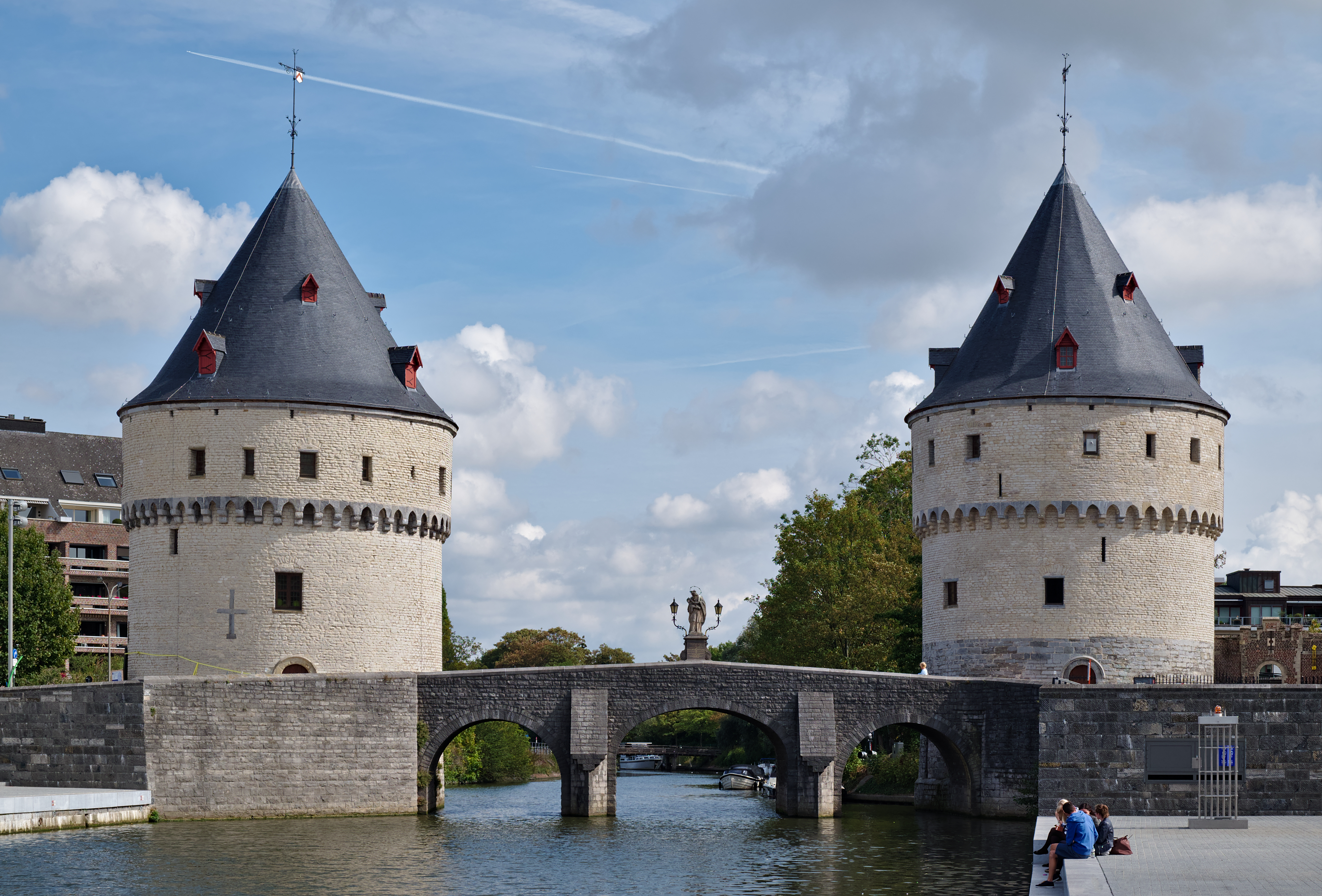
- the Broel Towers and the banks of the river Lys
- Interactive map of the Broel Towers area

General information
- Type: Fortification towers
- Architectural style: Gothic architecture
- Location: Courtrai, Belgium
- Coordinates: 50°49′49″N 3°16′1″E
- Completed: 1385; 1415 (expansion)

The Broel Towers (Dutch: Broeltorens) are a listed monument and a landmark in the Belgian city of Kortrijk (Courtrai). The towers are known as one of the most important symbols of the city.

== History ==
Although they look identical, the towers were not built at the same time. The Southern tower, also known as the Speyetoren, was built in 1385 to control the traffic on the river Lys. This tower was part of the fortified fence of the first medieval castle of the Counts of Flanders. The Speyentoren was also part of the 12th century rampart, destroyed by Louis XIV in the 17th century.
The Northern tower, known as the Ingelborchtoren was built in 1415 and was used as an armory.

Nowadays, the towers are, together with the Artillerytower (in Dutch: Artillerietoren), the last remaining parts of the medieval city wall around the city. Most of the fortifications in Kortrijk were ordered to be destroyed by Vauban in 1683, a period in which the French and the Spanish armies repeatedly fought over control of the region. The remaining parts were destroyed in the 18th century and during the world wars.

A statue of John of Nepomuk can be found in the middle of the bridge spanning between the two towers. This statue of the patron saint of the drowned has, ironically, fallen into the river Lys on several occasions due to warfare in the city. The bridge between the two towers was destroyed in both world wars.

== Gallery ==
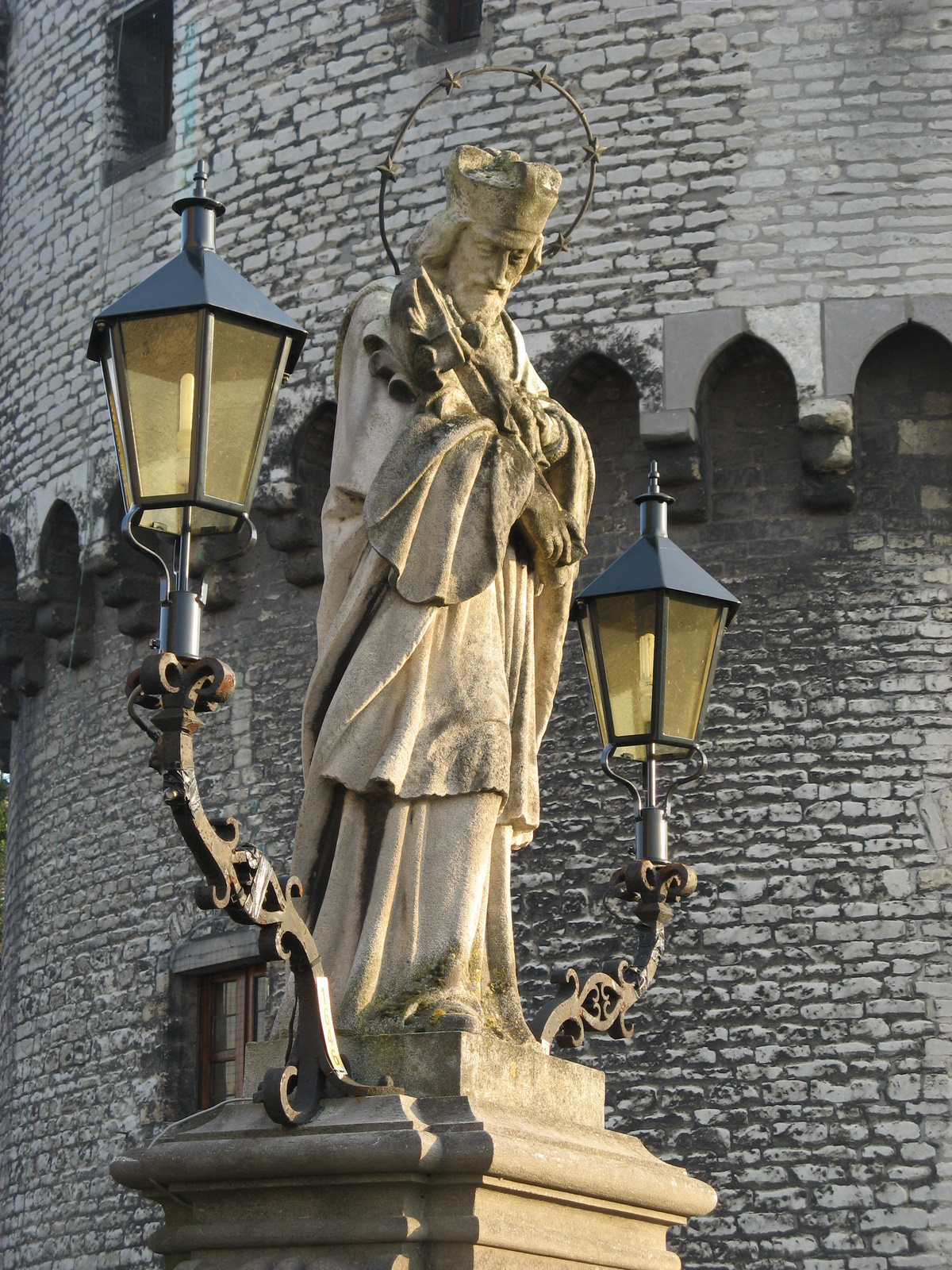
John of Nepomuk statue on the Broel Bridge

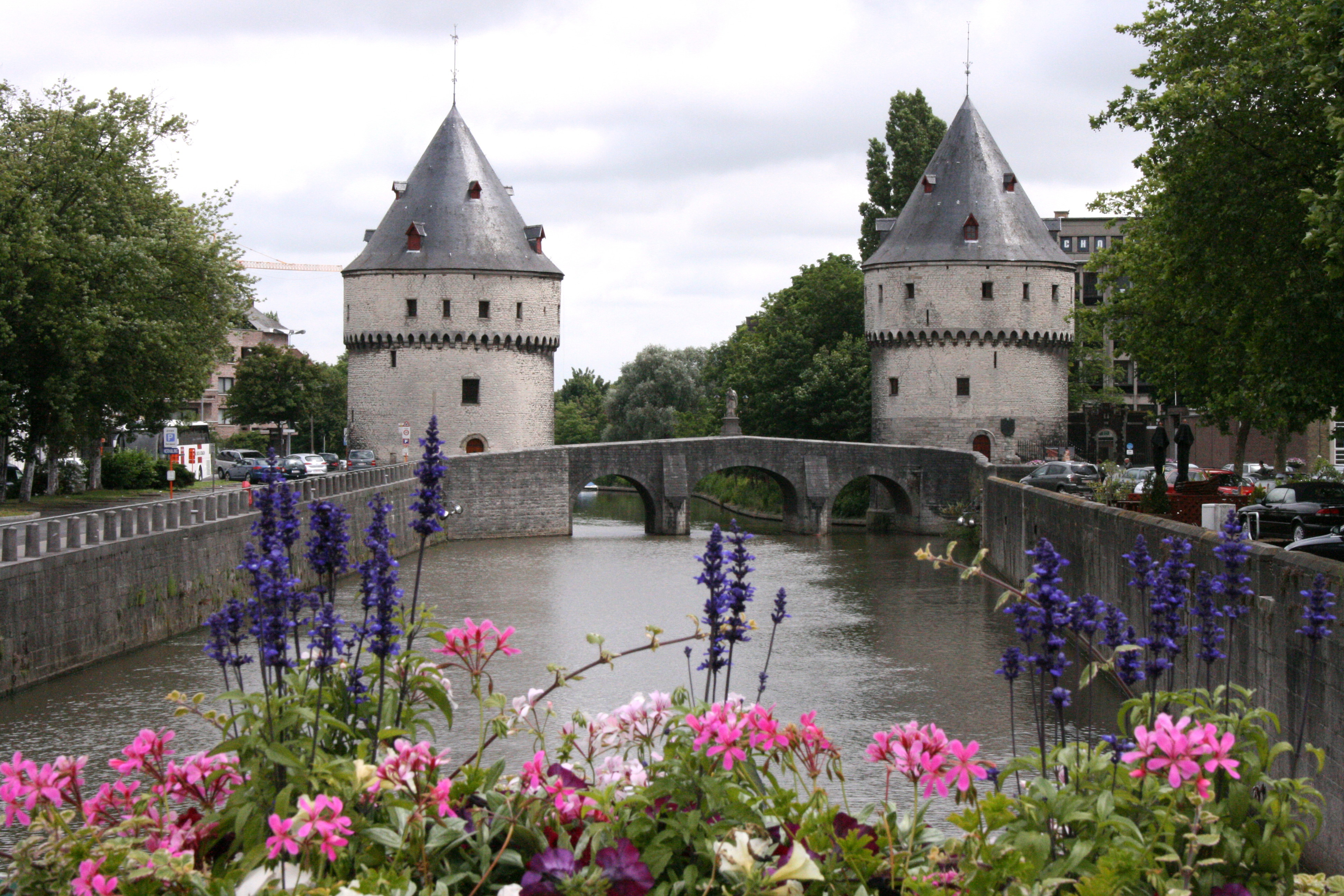
The 'Speytorre' (l.) and the 'Inghelburghtorre' (r.)

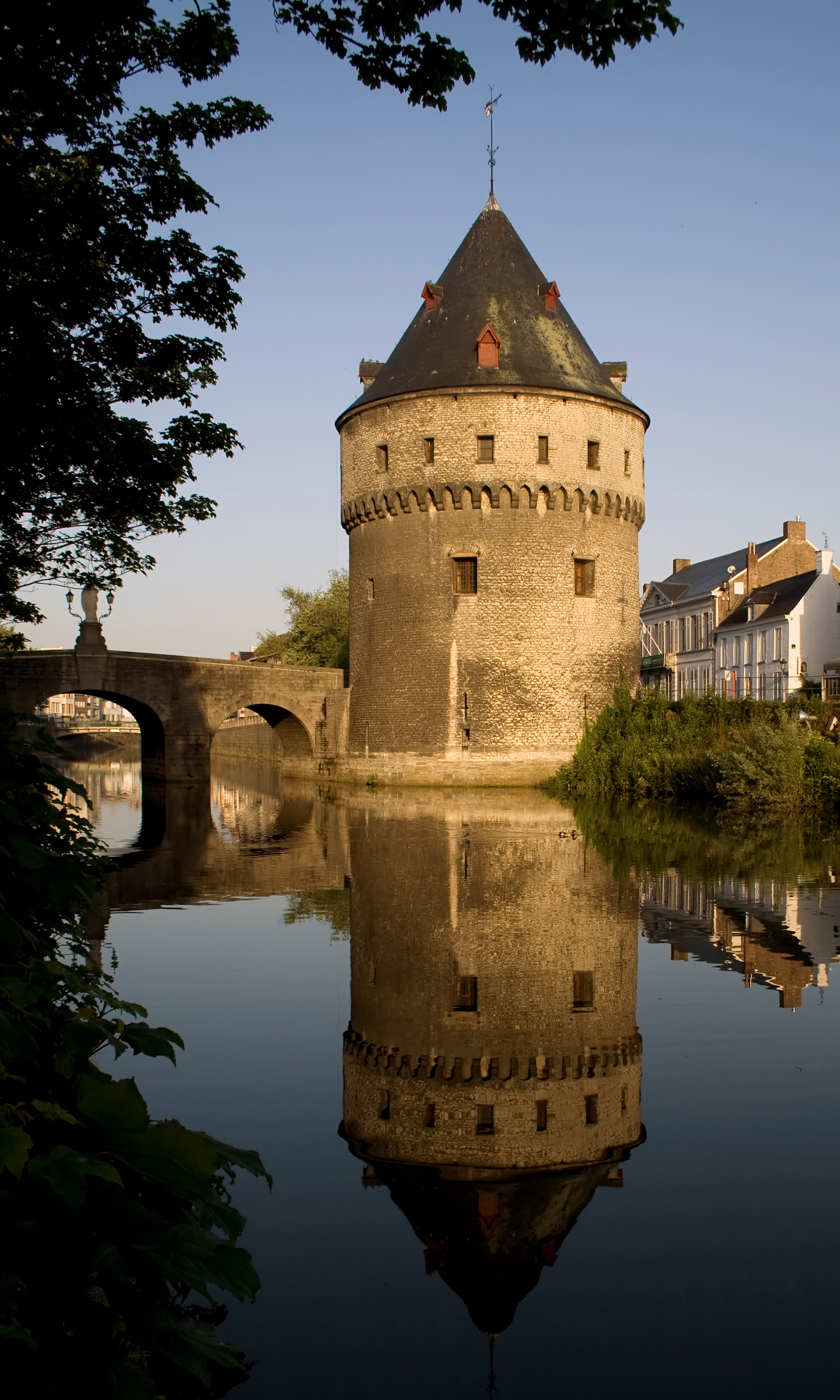
The Inghelburghtorre (1415)

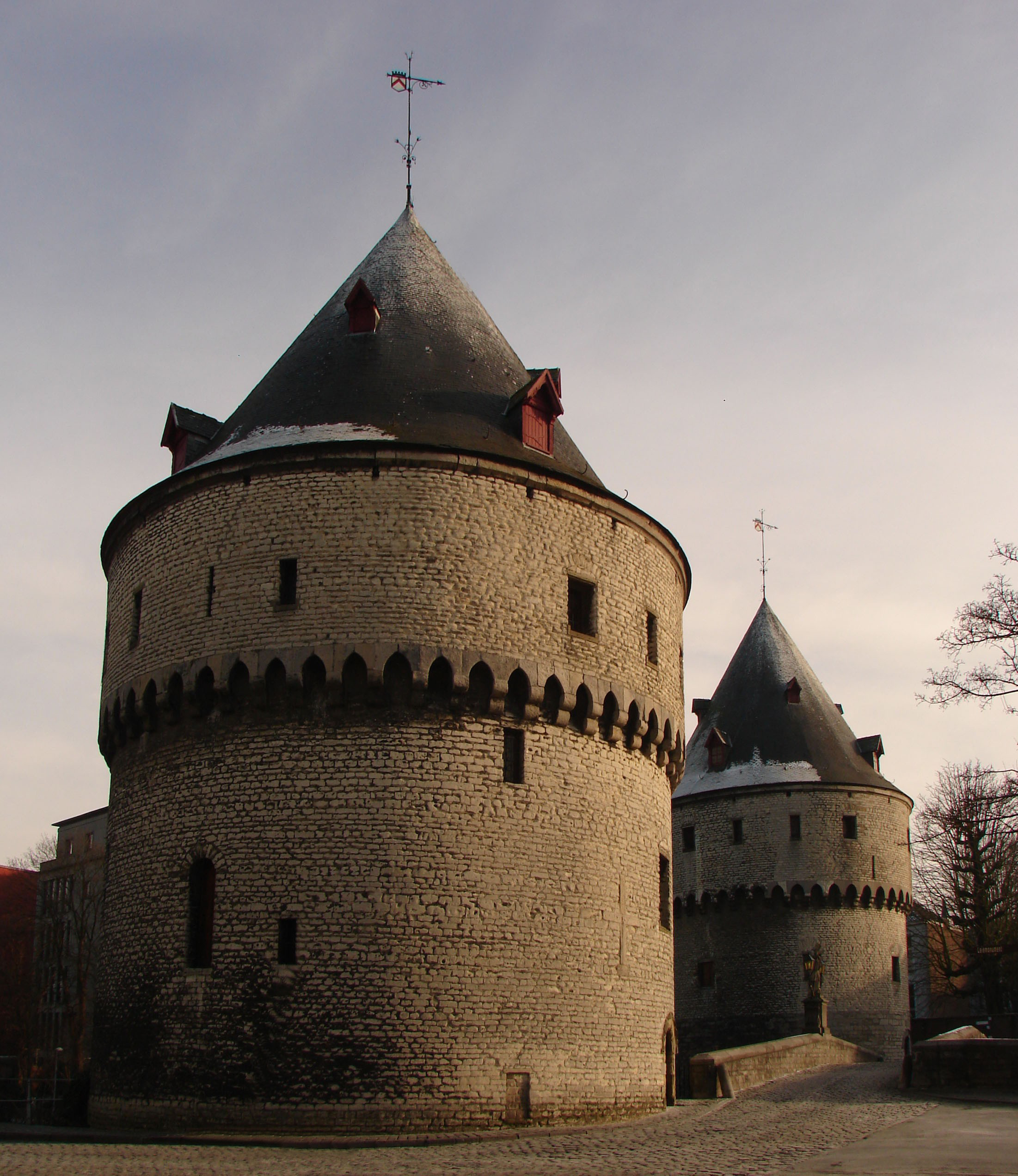
The 'Speytorre' or 'Blauwe Toren' (1385)

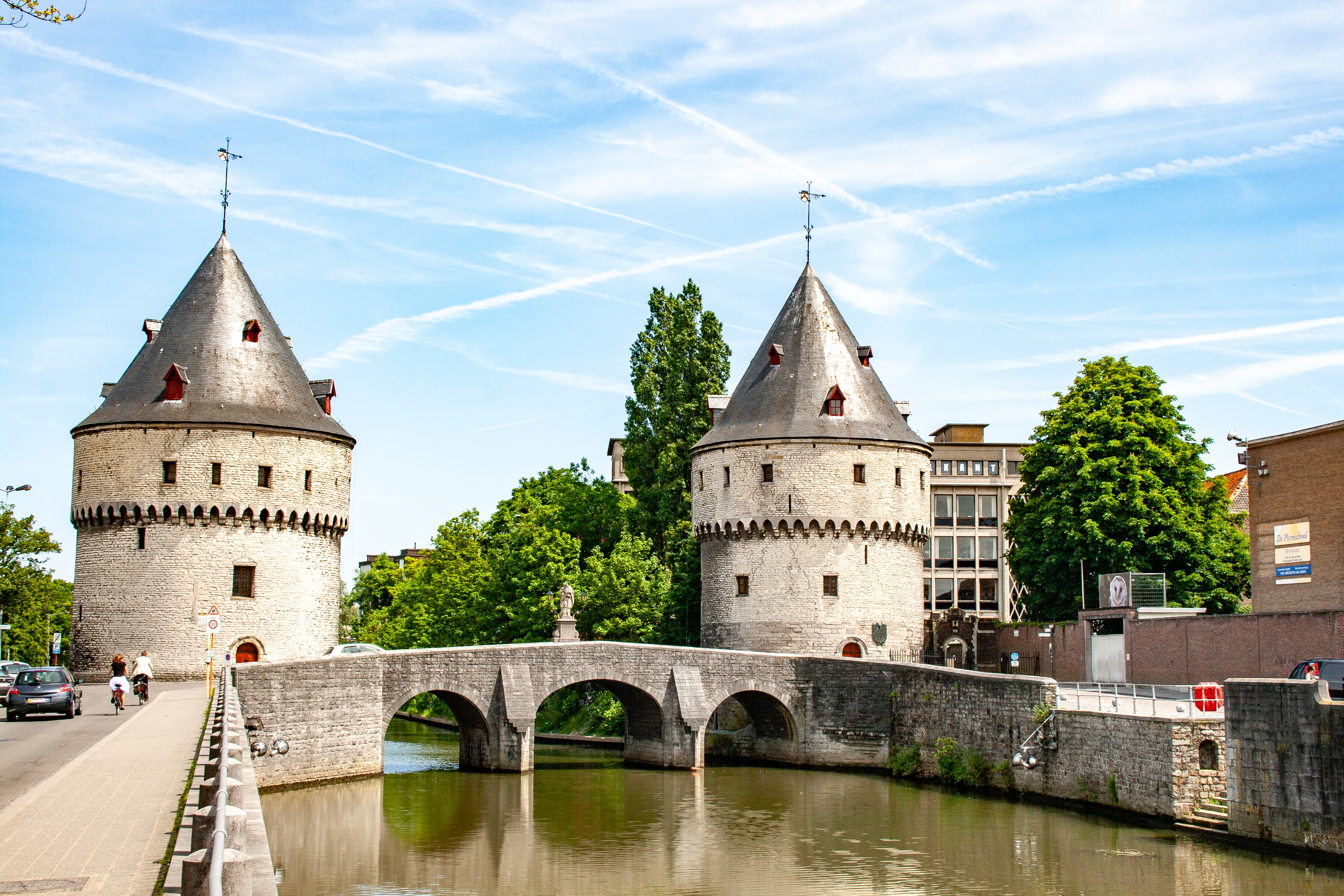
Broeltowers in 2009
