= Budești (disambiguation) =

Budești may refer to several places:

== Romania ==
- Budești, a town in Călărași County
- Budești, Bistrița-Năsăud, a commune in Bistriţa-Năsăud County
- Budești, Maramureș, a commune in Maramureș County
- Budești, Vâlcea, a commune in Vâlcea County
- Budești, a village in Pleșcuța Commune, Arad County
- Budești, a village in Plopana Commune, Bacău County
- Budești, a village in Chiliile Commune, Buzău County
- Budești, a village in Mogoșești Commune, Iași County
- Budești, a village in Făurei Commune, Neamț County
- Budești, a village in Crețești Commune, Vaslui County
- Budești, a village in Diculești Commune, Vâlcea County
- Budești, a village in Cotești Commune, Vrancea County

== Moldova ==
- Budești, Chișinău, a commune in Chișinău Municipality

== See also ==
- Buda (disambiguation)
- Budeni (disambiguation)
