= Clemenceau Medical Center =

Teaching hospital in Beirut, Lebanon

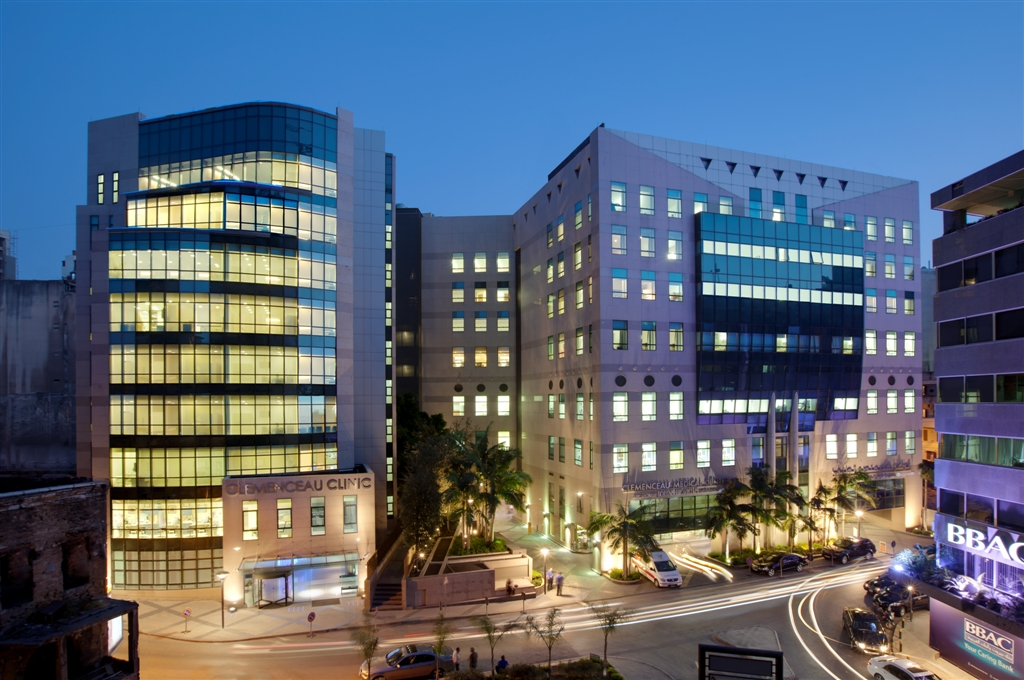

Clemenceau Medical Center (CMC) Beirut is teaching hospital is affiliated with Johns Hopkins Medicine International located in Beirut, Lebanon. The 158 bed hospital houses all the specialty branches, including Neurology, General Surgery, Pulmonary, Cardiac Center, Urology, OB/GYN, Fertility & IVF Center, Digestive Disease & Colonoscopy Center, Diagnostic Services, Robotic Surgery, and Cancer Center with Radiation Oncology Department.

CMC includes ICU/CCU beds, NICU beds, where patients are monitored in private rooms. CMC has also dedicated a specific ward for patients undergoing ambulatory and day surgeries. Full emergency department services and urgent care are also provided at the hospital. Moreover, the medical center is equipped with 11 Operating Theaters complemented by laparoscopy, OR automation systems, and daVinci Robotics System.

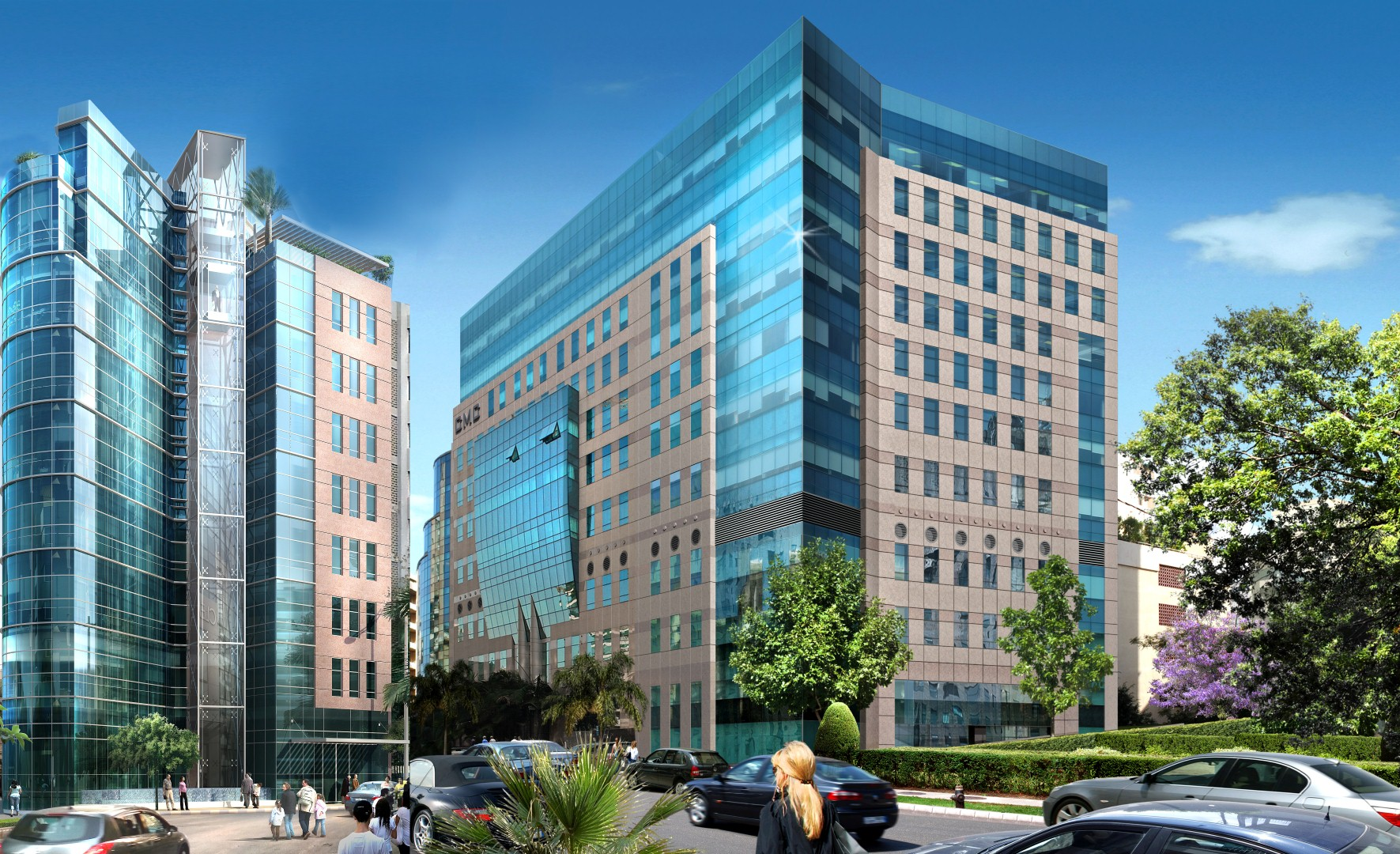

CMC has received multiple accreditations from Joint Commission International and has also achieved medical tourism certification for excellence in quality of care and services for medical tourists through the Medical Travel Quality Alliance.

Clemenceau Medicine International (CMI), a sister company to CMC, is currently in the process of building and operating a number of medical centers in the Middle East region. Abdali Hospital located in Amman, Jordan is built and designed by CMI. In addition, CMI is also in the process of building and operating CMC Riyadh in Riyadh, Saudi Arabia and CMC DHCC in Dubai, United Arab Emirates. The medical centers in Dubai and Riyadh will be affiliated with CMC in Beirut and will be part of the Clemenceau Medicine International.

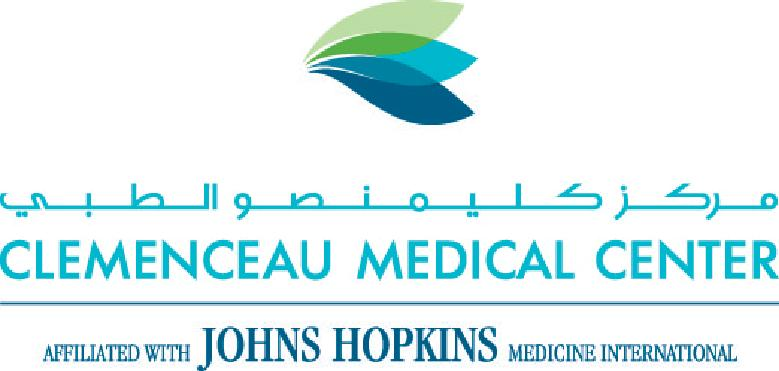
