= Budișteni =

Budişteni may refer to several villages in Romania:

- Budişteni, a village in Leordeni Commune, Argeș County
- Budişteni, a village in Costești, Buzău
