= Johns Hopkins Medicine International =

US partnership program

Johns Hopkins Medicine International (JHMI), not to be confused with Johns Hopkins Medical Institute, also (JHMI), is a partnership program established by the Johns Hopkins School of Medicine to raise the standard of health care through long-term, mission-driven agreements.

== Types of partnerships ==
=== Hospital Management ===
In a Hospital Management program, JHMI oversees the partner institution’s daily operations at an executive level. Examples include:

- Al Rahba Hospital, United Arab Emirates
- Tawam Hospital, UAE

=== Clinical Operation ===
JHMI oversees the partner institution’s clinical operations:

- Tawam Molecular Imaging Center, United Arab Emirates

=== Affiliations ===
Affiliated institutions have a Hopkins faculty member appointed as a part-time medical director to assess, promote and monitor medical quality and safety

- HCL Avitas, India
- Amcare Labs International, Inc.
- Anadolu Medical Center, Turkey
- Clemenceau Medical Center, Lebanon
- Clínica Las Condes, Chile
- Pacifica Salud Hospital Punta Pacifica, in Panama City
- Tokyo Midtown Medical Center, Japan

=== Strategic Collaborations ===
JHMI provides educational and consulting support to:

- Monterrey Institute of Technology and Higher Education, Mexico
- Medcan Clinic, Canada
- Cardiocentro, Brazil
- San Matteo Hospital, Italy
- Trinidad and Tobago Health Sciences Institute, Trinidad and Tobago
