= CardioVascular and Interventional Radiology =

- Discipline: Interventional Radiology
- Language: English
- Edited by: Klaus Hausegger

Publication details
- History: 1978–present
- Publisher: Springer Science+Business Media (International)
- Frequency: Monthly
- Impact factor: 2.740 (2020)

Standard abbreviations
- ISO 4: CardioVasc. Interv. Radiol.
- NLM: Cardiovasc Intervent Radiol

Indexing
- CODEN: CARADG
- ISSN: 0174-1551 (print); 1432-086X (web)
- OCLC no.: 06118549

Links
- Journal homepage; Website; Submissions

CardioVascular and Interventional Radiology is a peer-reviewed medical journal published by Springer. It is the journal of the Cardiovascular and Interventional Radiological Society of Europe.

It had an impact factor of 2.191 in 2016. It is abstracted and indexed in Science Citation Index Expanded, Journal Citation Reports/Science Edition, PubMed/MEDLINE, Scopus, EMBASE, Google Scholar, Academic OneFile, CSA Environmental Sciences, Current Contents/Clinical Medicine, EmCare, Gale, Health Reference Center Academic, INIS Atomindex, Mosby yearbooks, OCLC, SCImage, Summon by ProQuest.
