= Cardiovascular and Interventional Radiological Society of Europe =

Organisation involved in scholarly research

The Cardiovascular and Interventional Radiological Society of Europe (CIRSE) is a learned society of interventional radiologists from Europe and overseas. The society has its headquarters in Vienna (Austria) and was founded in 1985 by the merging of the European College of Angiography (ECA; founded 1976) and European Society of Cardio-Vascular Radiology and Interventional Radiology (ESCVIR; founded 1976). It currently has approximately 4,200 members from around the world, including 24 national societies. CIRSE's objective is to provide continuing education to physicians and scientists with an active interest in interventional radiology and to promote research as well as registries.

CIRSE organises an annual congress with more than 7,000 participants (per 2020), scientific meetings such as the European Conference on Embolotherapy and the European Conference on Interventional Oncology, as well as educational activities such as courses focusing on specific procedures. It established the bimonthly medical journal entitled CardioVascular and Interventional Radiology (CVIR) in October 1991, when a contract was signed with the publisher Springer Nature, and well as having other publications such as newsletters and practice manuals.

== CIRSE Foundation ==
CIRSE's educational arm, the CIRSE Foundation, is an independent non-profit foundation, promoting research and education in the fields of cardiovascular and interventional radiology. The foundation sponsors several research and educational grants every year, including registries and trials and specialized hands-on workshops. At its creation in 2000 as an independent nonprofit and tax-exempt body, it was originally called the Foundation for Interventional Radiology in Europe (FIRE).
