= Verwee =

Verwee is a surname. Notable people with the surname include:

- Alfred Verwee (1838–1895), Belgian painter
- Louis-Charles Verwee (1832–1882), Belgian painter
- Louis-Pierre Verwee (1807–1877), Belgian painter
