= Paul Parmentier =

Belgian painter (1854-1902)

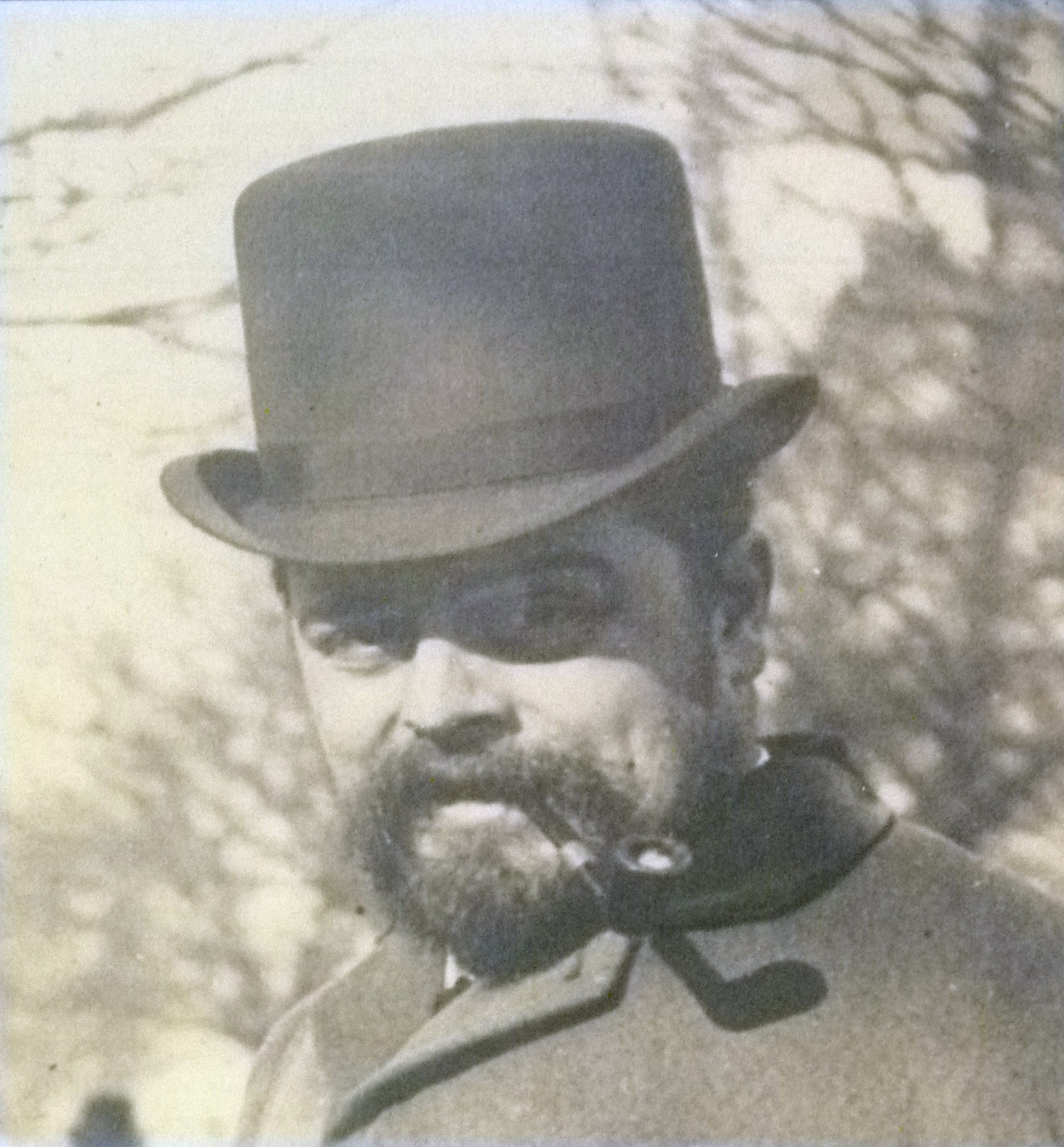
Paul Parmentier

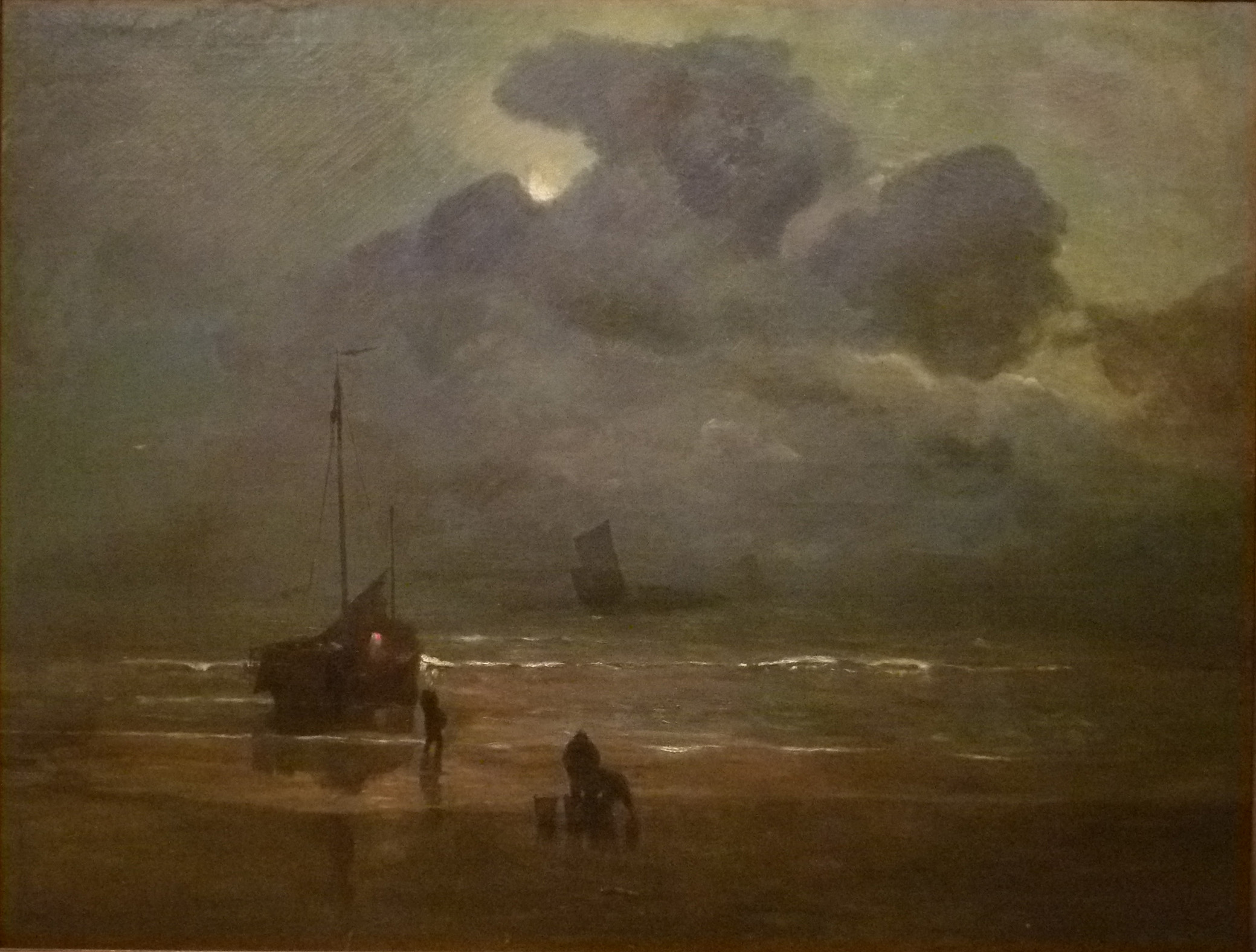
Sunset Over the Sea

Paul Eugène Parmentier (15 February 1854, Brussels – 22 August 1902, Knokke) was a Belgian painter; known for his landscapes, seascapes and scenes with animals.

== Biography ==
He came from a wealthy family. His father, Eugène Parmentier, owned a cotton factory and, from 1884 to 1892, was a member of the Chamber of Representatives.

He began painting as a hobby. In the 1880s, he began visiting the small fishing village of Knokke; a popular gathering place for artists and writers. There, he came to know the animal painter, Alfred Verwee, from whom he took several lessons. In 1890, he settled there with his wife and five children; four sons and one daughter, Suzanne, who became a well known author.

He rarely exhibited his works, and attracted little attention from the art world. It was many years after World War II before his paintings were shown to the general public. Most are still privately owned. A few are in the possession of the municipality of Knokke. He was also a fairly competent photographer. Some of his photographs, of people and places around Knokke, served as inspiration for his friend, Verwee.

For a time, he was involved in local politics; serving as a municipal councilor in 1890, and an alderman in 1891. That same year, he formed a partnership with Verwee, called "Knokke-Attractions", to promote tourism.

He designed the Knokke coat-of-arms, which was used until Knokke merged with Heist-aan-Zee in 1971. A major street there is named after him.

== Sources ==
- Norbert Hostyn, "Paul Parmentier", in: Lexicon van Westvlaamse Beeldende Kunstenaars, Vol.1, Vereniging van Westvlaamse Schrijvers, 1992 ISBN 978-90-7239-015-8
- Patrick Berko, Viviane Berko, Norbert Hostyn, Marines van Belgische Schilders geboren tussen 1750 en 1875, Laconti, 1984
- Danny Lanoy, Frieda Devinck, Thérèse Thomas, Impressionisten in Knokke & Heyst (1870-1914), Stichting Kunstboek 2007, ISBN 978-90-585-6247-0
