= Jan Baptiste de Jonghe =

Belgian painter (1785–1844)

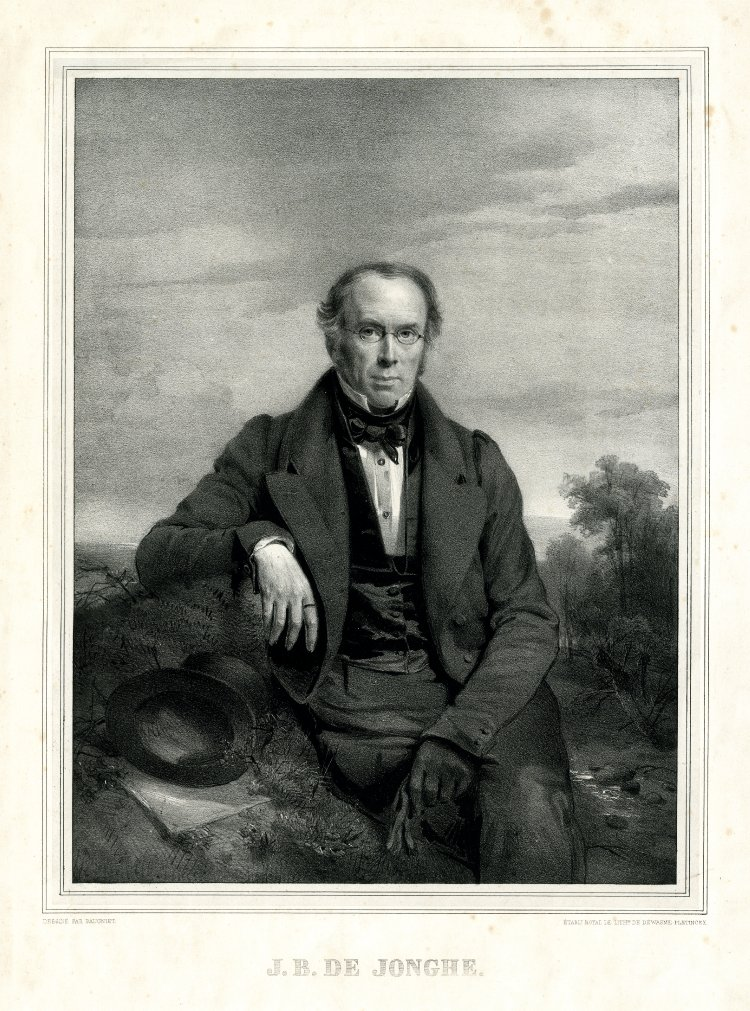
Portrait of Jan Baptiste de Jonghe

Jan Baptiste de Jonghe or Jean-Baptiste de Jonghe (Kortrijk, 8 January 1785 – Schaerbeek, 14 October 1844) was a Belgian painter, draughtsman, etcher and lithographer. He is known for his Romantic landscapes with people, herds and ruins. In his graphic work he also made views of cities in the area of what is now Belgium and the Netherlands. He was an art professor at the Academy of Kortrijk and the Antwerp Academy of Fine Arts.

== Life ==
Jan Baptiste de Jonghe was born in Kortrijk as the son of a wealthy businessman who was mayor of Kortrijk from 1805 to 1817. He received his first training at the Academie van Kortrijk, where he studied for two years. His drawing instructor was the sculptor Pieter Van Reable. He then went to study at the Antwerp Academy of Fine Arts. Here one of his professors was the renowned animal and landscape painter Balthasar Paul Ommeganck. Ommeganck is believed to have set de Jonghe on the path of landscape and animal painting. When in 1812 he won the prize for landscape painting at a competition organized by the drawing academy of Ghent, he started to fully concentrate on this subject matter.

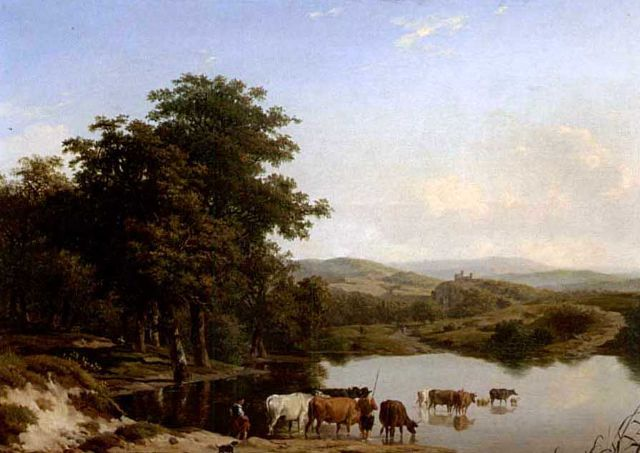
Cattle in the Ardennes

He participated in various other art competitions in Northern France and Belgium and was successful in Douai, Brussels and Bruges. He travelled in The Netherlands, France and England.

In 1823-1824 he was one of the lithographers who made lithographs and provided drawings for the publication Collection des principales vues des Pays-Bas ('Collection of principal views of the Netherlands') published by Dewasme.

In 1825 the Academy of Antwerp admitted de Jonghe as a member. The next year he was appointed professor at the Academy of drawing and architecture in Kortrijk. In 1828 he was admitted as associate member of the Academy of Amsterdam. In 1836 the Belgian government appointed him to the jury tasked to choose the artwork to be acquired by the Belgian state at that year's salon. In 1840, Belgian King Leopold I commissioned from the artist six landscape paintings of sites in the Ardennes.

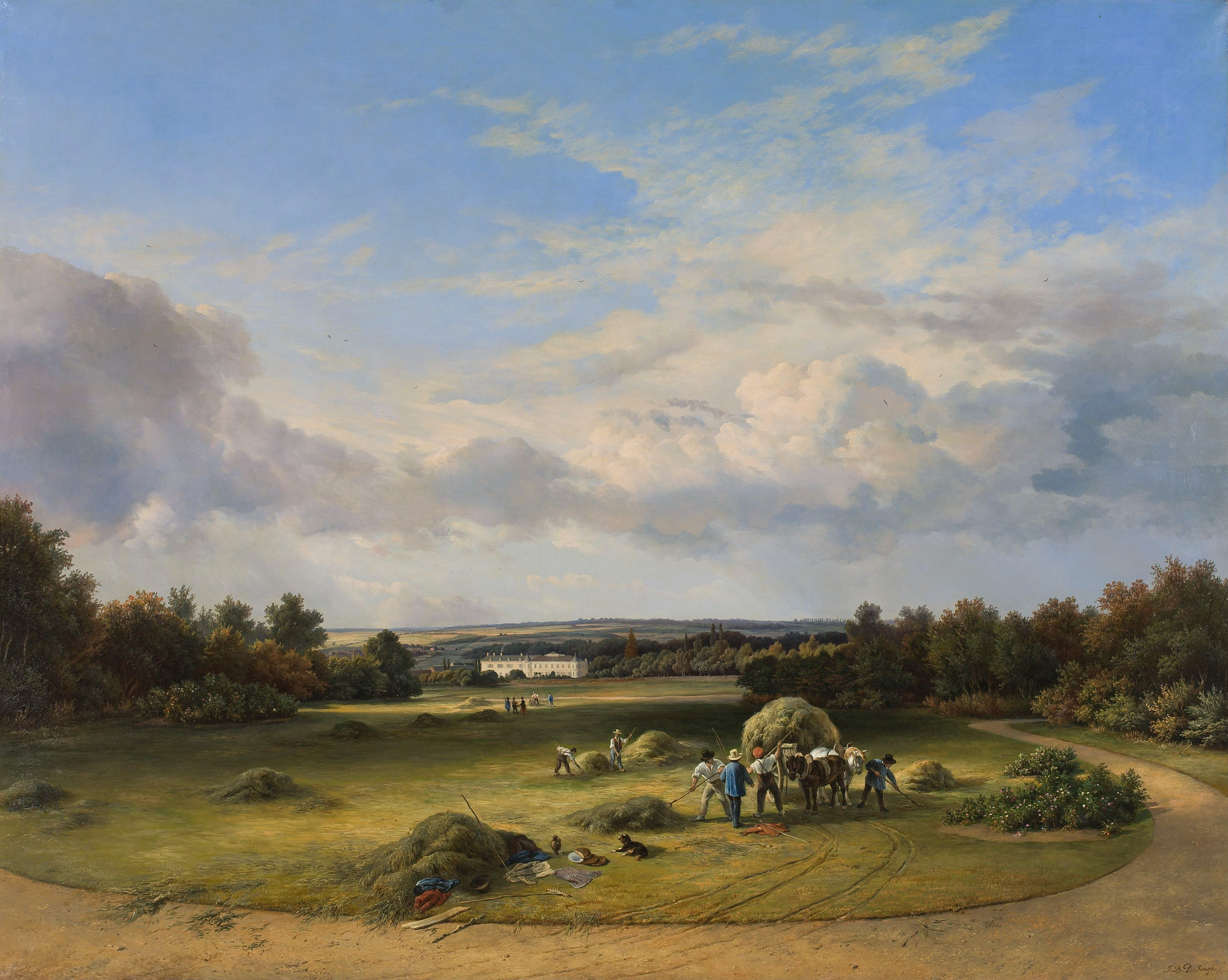
View of the Ardennes Castle

In 1841 de Jonghe was appointed professor of landscape and animal painting at the Academy of Antwerp. He only served in that role for a brief period as he had to resign for family reasons in 1843. After this he was occupied with various commissions in Brussels.

De Jonghe also played an important role as a teacher at the Academy of Kortrijk, where he trained a new generation of painters between 1826 and 1841, including Jean Baptiste Daveloose and Louis-Pierre Verwee. Other pupils of de Jonghe include Louis de Winter, Louis Robbe and Hendrik Frans Schaefels. Gustave Léonard de Jonghe, the son of the artist and his wife Maria Theresia Commeijne, received his first training from his father and became a society portrait and genre painter who worked in Paris for a fashionable clientele.

The artist died in Schaerbeek in 1844 after a brief illness.

== Work ==
Jan Baptiste de Jonghe was a painter, draughtsman, etcher and lithographer. He was specialised in landscapes and city views. His output was relatively limited. As he rarely dated his works his chronology is sometimes difficult to determine.

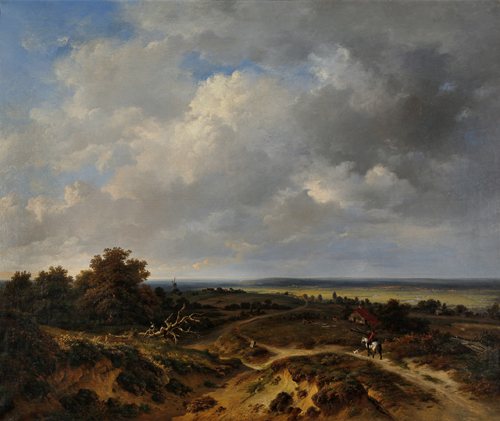
Landscape in the environs of Tournai

In his earliest works, De Jonghe interpreted nature in an idyllic, sentimental way. His paintings were romantic composite landscapes, such as the Border of the forest near Brussels. Initially he borrowed the formulas of 17th century Dutch landscape painting. The sky takes up a prominent place in his compositions as was the case in the work of Jan van Goyen. He had a preference for wooded landscapes and adopted the typical manner composition used by Jacob van Ruysdael with a path starting in the center of the first plane with some trees scattered on both sides. The mood is expressed through the sky, which is either calm, cloudy or stormy and the trees, which are either dying or in full bloom. There is also some body of water included either in the form of a pool, river or pond, at which wild or domesticated animals are drinking. He usually included few human figures in his compositions. For the staffage he often relied on other painters such as his friend and family member Eugène Joseph Verboeckhoven.

Later, he tried to reproduce his subjects more realistically and broke with the traditions of the conventional landscape. In his Landscape in the environs of Tournai of 1836 (Royal Museums of Fine Arts of Belgium), the artist gave the horizon an important role as he opened up the space and the sky became the key element of the composition. This desire to open up the composition is a defining characteristic of his mature period.

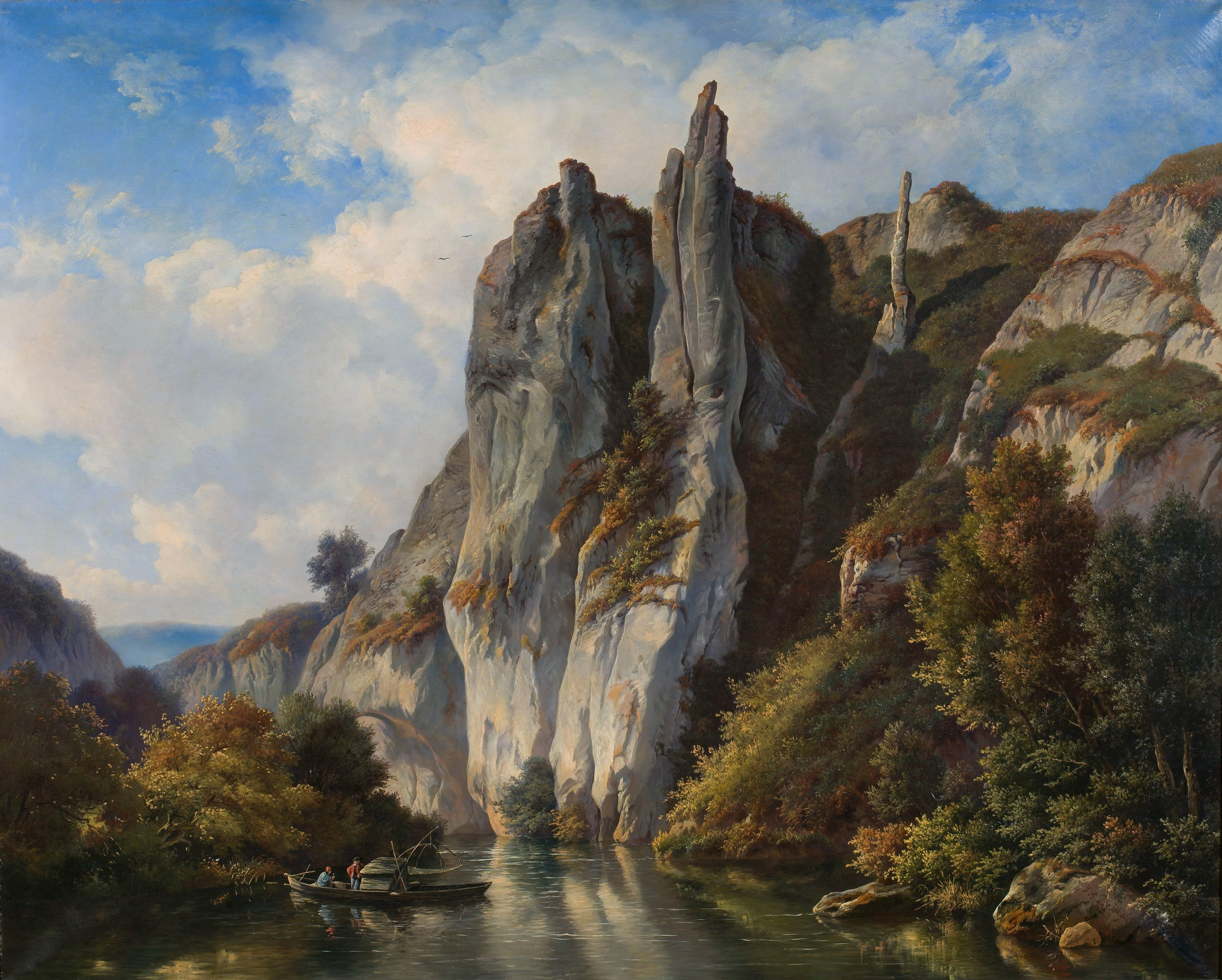
View in the Ardennes

De Jonghe never painted imaginary landscapes. He always painted real locations and the titles of his works often state where the landscape is located. Gradually some of his landscapes became more Romantic as he started to depict certain picturesque scenes in places such as the Ardennes. These works are more in line with artistic currents of the 19th century and were likely made at the end of his career.

During his tenure as an art professor at the Academy of Kortrijk he taught lithography. He published his teaching materials under the title Principes de paysages dessinés d’après nature et exécutés sur pierre ('Principles of landscapes drawn after nature and executed on stone') (Brussels, 1826). In this work he stressed the particular characteristics of different types of trees.
