= N34 road (Belgium) =

Road in Belgium

Coordinates: 51°13′17″N 2°53′37″E

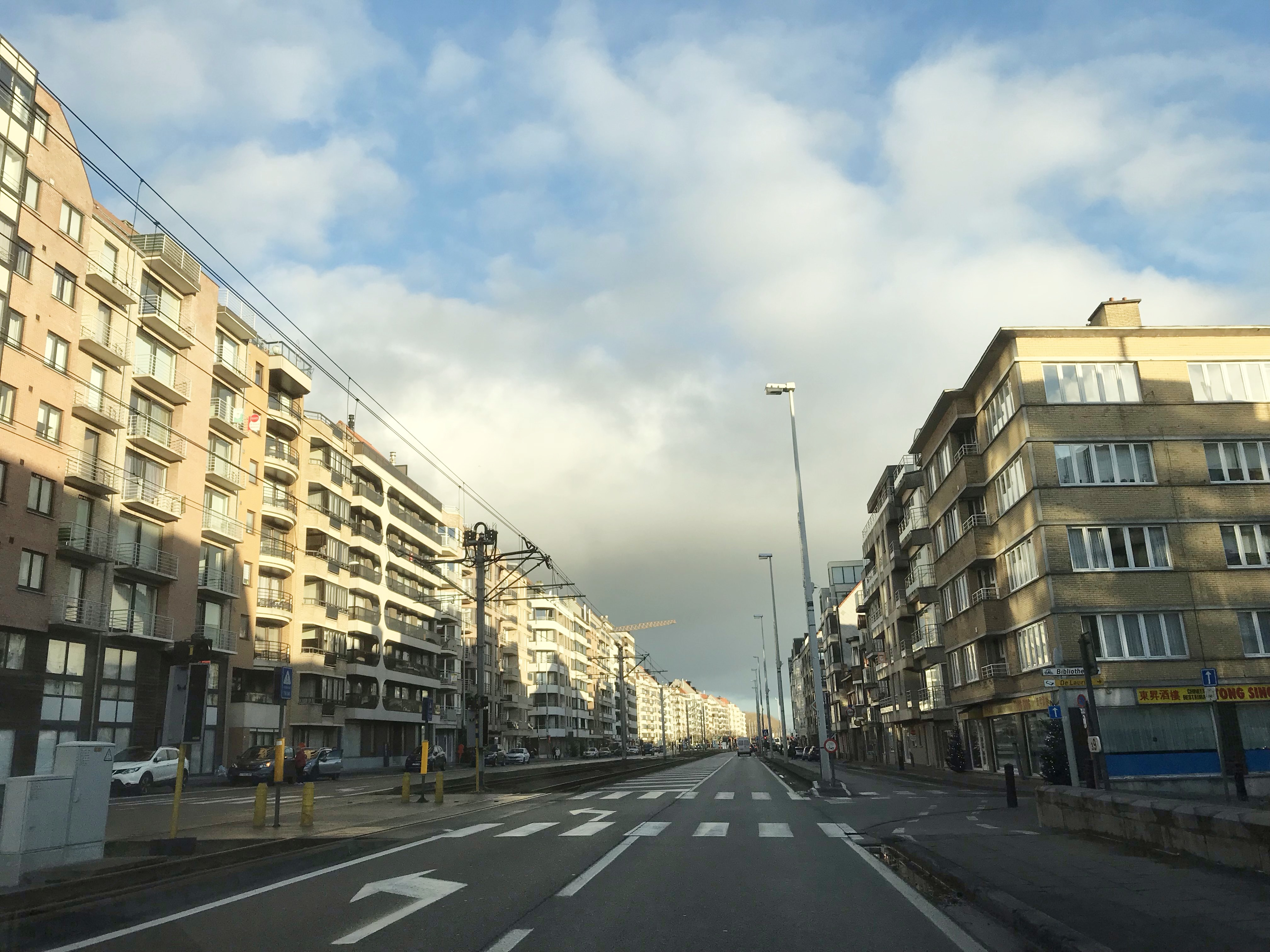
N34 at Heist.

The N34 is a coastal road in Belgium. It connects Knokke in the east with De Panne in the west, running along the coast line.
