= Louis-Charles Verwee =

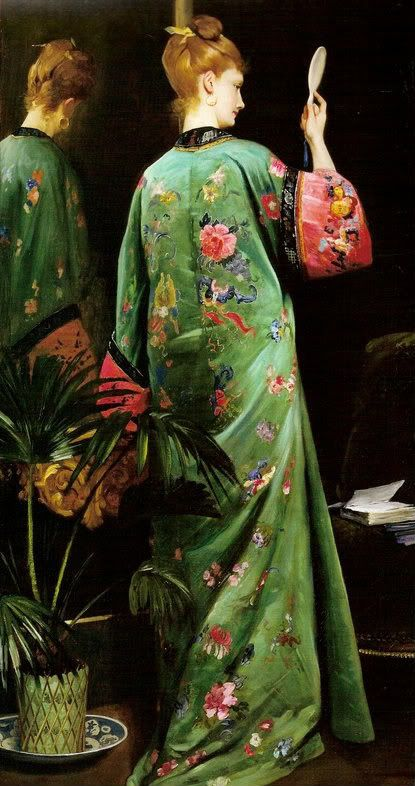
Young woman in a kimono with a fan or Vanity

Louis-Charles Verwée or Louis Charles Verwee (3 July 1832 – 9 July 1882) was a Belgian painter known for his interior scenes, genre scenes and glamorous society portraits. His genre scenes show romantic intrigues and young society ladies.

== Life ==
Louis-Charles Verwée was born in Brussels as the son of the prominent animal and landscape painter Louis-Pierre Verwee, originally from Kortrijk. His younger brother Alfred Verwee (1838–1895) became a well-known painter of animals, landscapes and seascapes. Louis-Charles Verwée received his initial art lessons from his father with whom he studies for several years.

He was less interested in the subject matter favoured by his father, i.e. animals and landscapes. He showed more inclination and ability for the painting of portraits and genre scenes. He particularly liked the style of the Belgian painters Alfred Stevens and Gustave Léonard de Jonghe. He subsequently attended the workshops of these two artists.

He participated in many Salons, including in Brussels in 1854, in Antwerp in 1861, in Ghent in 1871 and Amsterdam in 1877. He died in 1882 in Saint-Josse-ten-Noode.

== Work ==
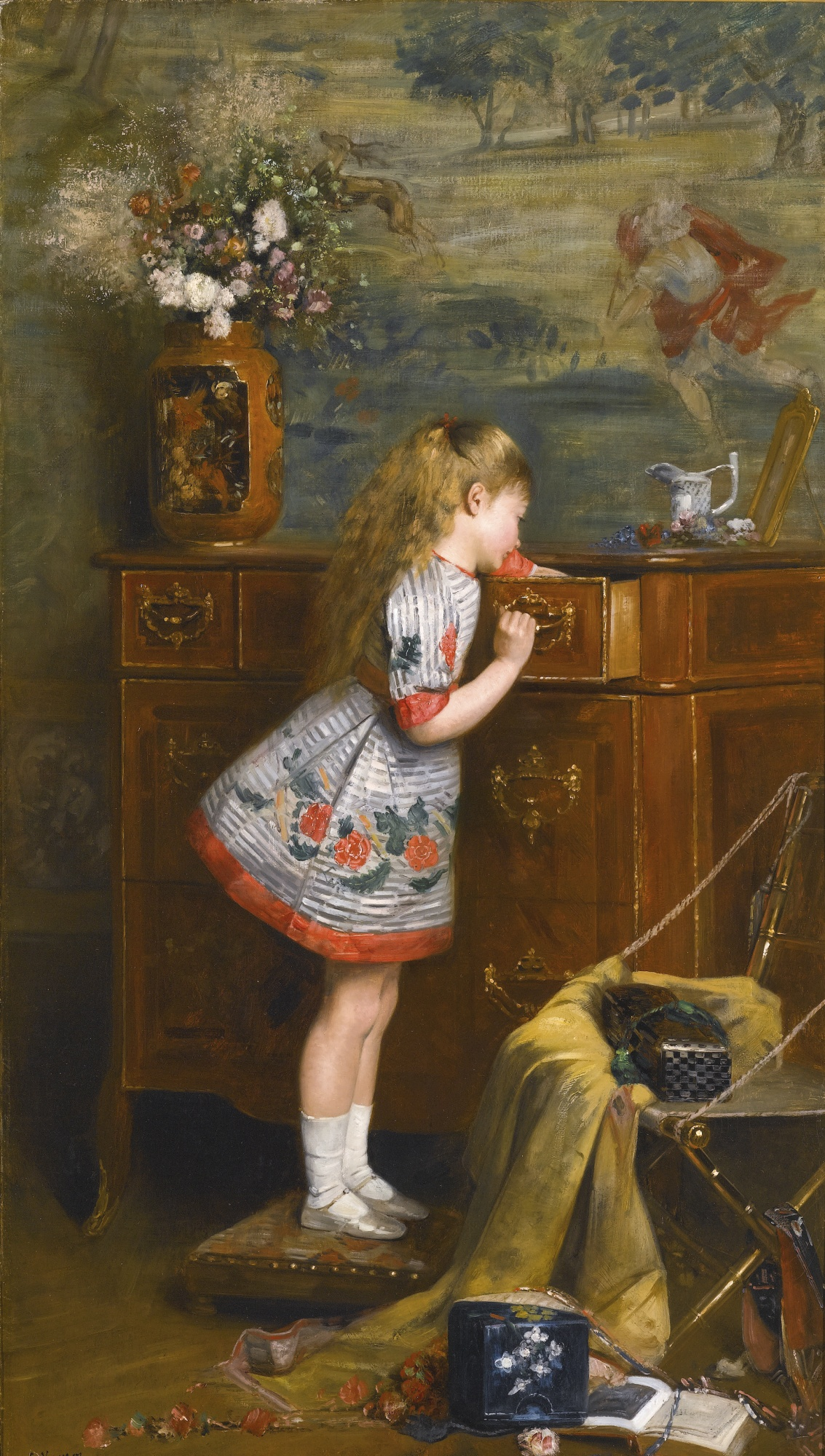
Curiosity

Louis-Charles Verwée was a portrait and genre painter. Most of his works depict interior scenes with some anecdotal event. These usually involve young women or children engaged in some mundane activity such as pressing a lemon, reading a book or rummaging through a drawer. He was particularly skilled at capturing the spontaneity of the intimate moments of his characters.

He painted portraits mainly of women in a style which is close to that of Belgian painters Alfred Stevens, Gustave Léonard de Jonghe and Charles Baugniet. He is regarded as representing the modern trend in the Classical school together with the Belgian painter Charles Hermans.

The artist also created some scenes with lower class characters, such as in The knife sharpener. Belgian king Leopold II acquired his work entitled Diplomacy, which is still in the royal collections.
