= Alfred Verwee =

Belgian painter (1838–1895)

Alfred Jacques Verwee
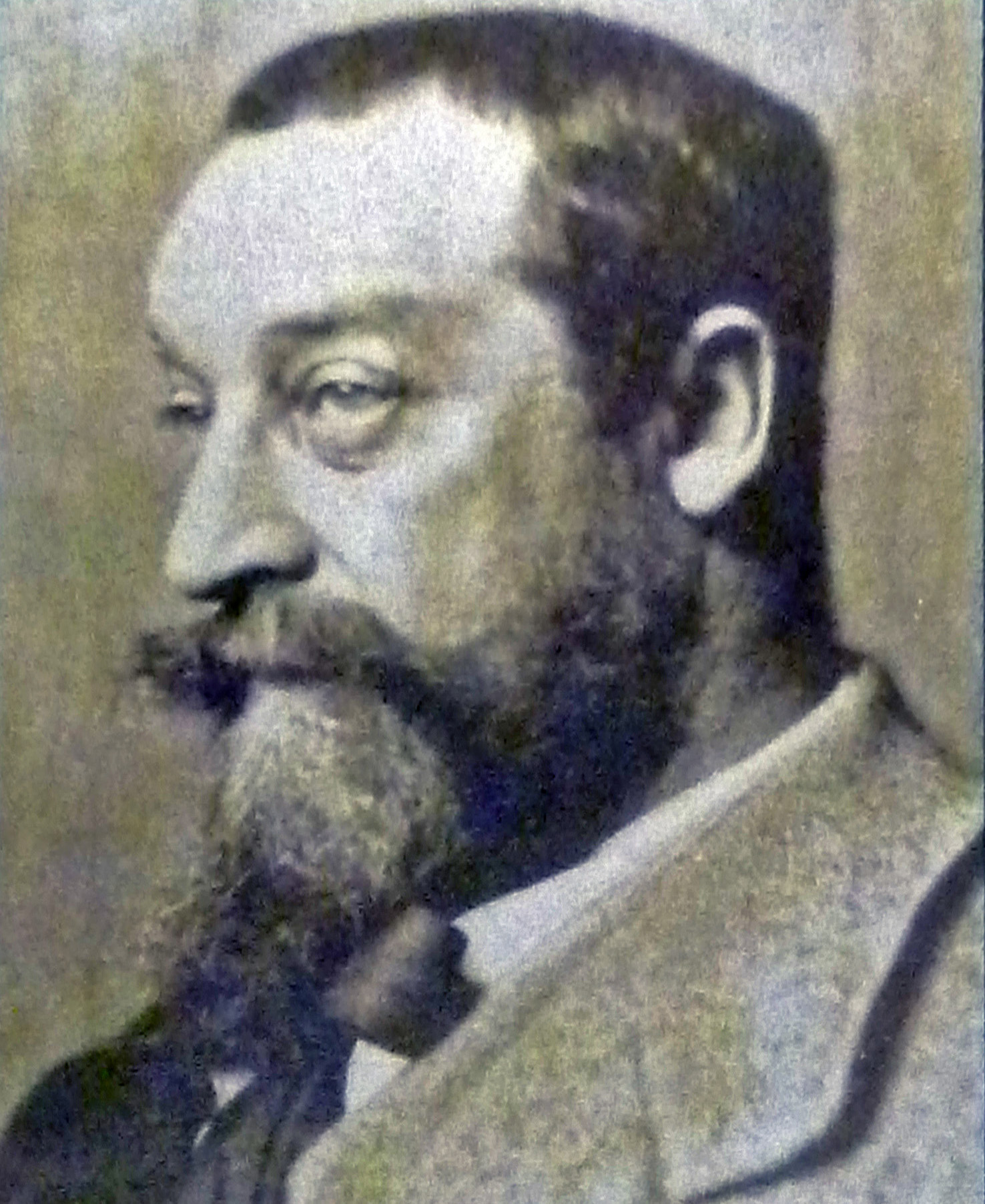
- Alfred Verwee (date and photographer unknown)
- Born: Alfred Jacques Verwee; 23 April 1838; Saint-Josse-ten-Noode, Belgium
- Died: 15 September 1895 (aged 57); Schaerbeek, Belgium
- Education: Académie Royale des Beaux-Arts of Brussels
- Occupation: Painter
- Relatives: Louis-Pierre Verwee (father) Louis-Charles Verwee (brother)

Alfred Jacques Verwee (23 April 1838, Saint-Josse-ten-Noode – 15 September 1895, Schaerbeek) was a Belgian painter known for his depictions of animals, landscapes and seascapes.

== Life ==
His father was the painter Louis-Pierre Verwee and his brother Louis-Charles Verwee would also become a painter. He was originally trained to be a surveyor, but could not complete his engineering studies due to family financial difficulties. Painting had long been a hobby so, with his father's support, he began to pursue that as a career. One of his earliest influences was the French artist Constant Troyon, a member of the Barbizon school. In 1853, he took lessons from the landscape and portrait painter François Charles Deweirdt (1799-1855), who had been a friend and collaborator of his father's. He later enrolled at the Académie Royale des Beaux-Arts of Brussels, but attended only a few classes.

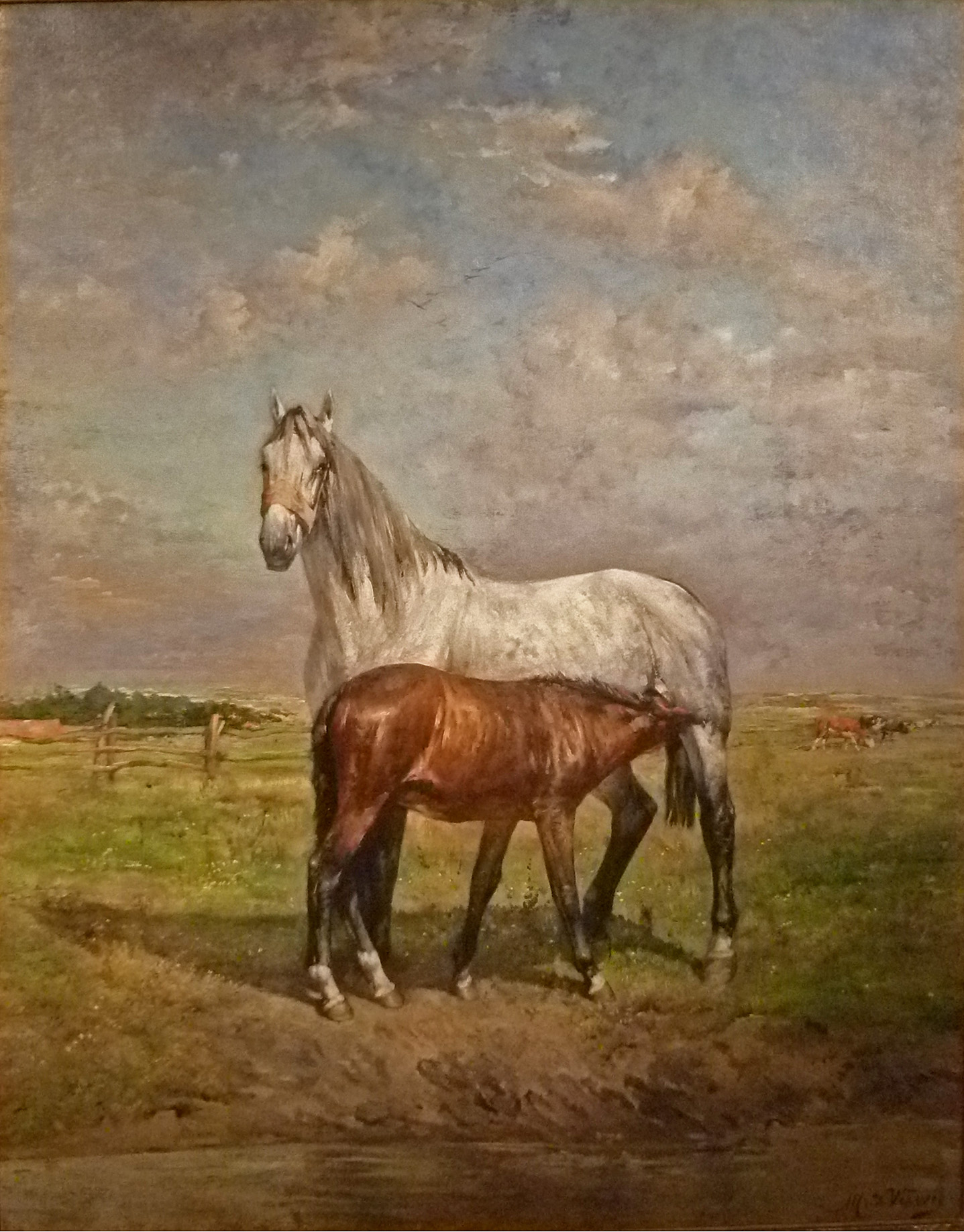
Merrie en veulen (Mare with Foal), date unknown

His first exhibition was in 1857, but he did not achieve true recognition until 1863, when he had a show at the Brussels Salon, where he was awarded a gold medal. He won another gold medal at the Paris Salon of 1864. On the advice of professional acquaintances, he settled in Paris and made contact with more painters of the Barbizon school. However, this did not lead to the expected financial success, and he returned to Brussels a year later. Then, from 1867 to 1868, he lived in London but, again, commercial success was unobtainable and he returned home broke. Despite this, he married and then undertook a tour of the Netherlands.

That same year, he became a founding member of the "Société Libre des Beaux-Arts", a group that was opposed to academicism in art. He began painting plein air to achieve a naturalistic style during this time. From 1875 to 1880, he attempted to create a grand vision of the Flemish countryside. In 1876, he helped establish "La Chrysalide", a short-lived association considered a forerunner to "Les XX". Two years later he, François Musin, Louis Dubois, Amédée Lynen and others were invited by the architectural firm of Naert and Laureys to provide decorations for a new spa in Ostend. The hall he decorated is now known as the "Verwee-zaal".

=== Art and business in Knokke ===
Around 1880, he became fascinated with the area surrounding Knokke, and an informal artists' colony slowly took root there. At the time, he began alternating between landscape and animal painting, doing the landscapes plein air and posing the animals in his studio. He is generally considered to be Belgium's first great animal painter.

By 1887, he saw that Knokke could become a major tourist attraction, so he joined with two local businessmen to purchase a large tract of dunes and polders to subdivide for property developers. In 1888, he built a villa, the "Fleur des Dunes" and, in 1891, joined with his friend, Paul Parmentier, to create "Knokke-Attractions", a promotional firm.

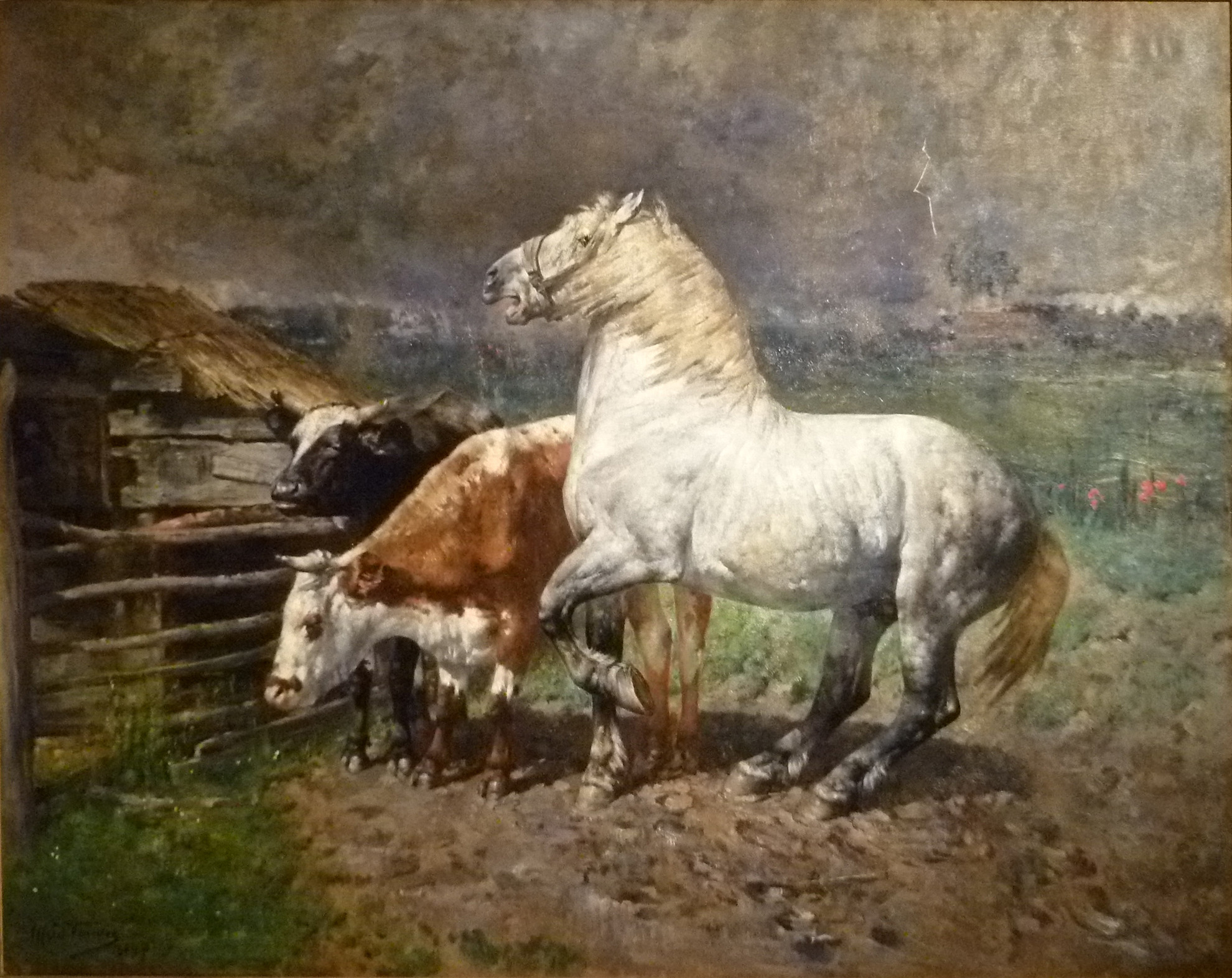
L'approche de l'orage (Thunderstorm), date unknown)

His health began to deteriorate in 1892. First, he suffered from rheumatism, then was diagnosed with throat cancer. In 1895, he travelled to Southern France, Algeria and Egypt in hopes of finding a warm, dry climate that would improve his health. A few weeks before his death, his friends brought him back to Knokke and he died at his home in Schaerbeek.
