= Gustave Léonard de Jonghe =

Flemish painter (1829–1893)

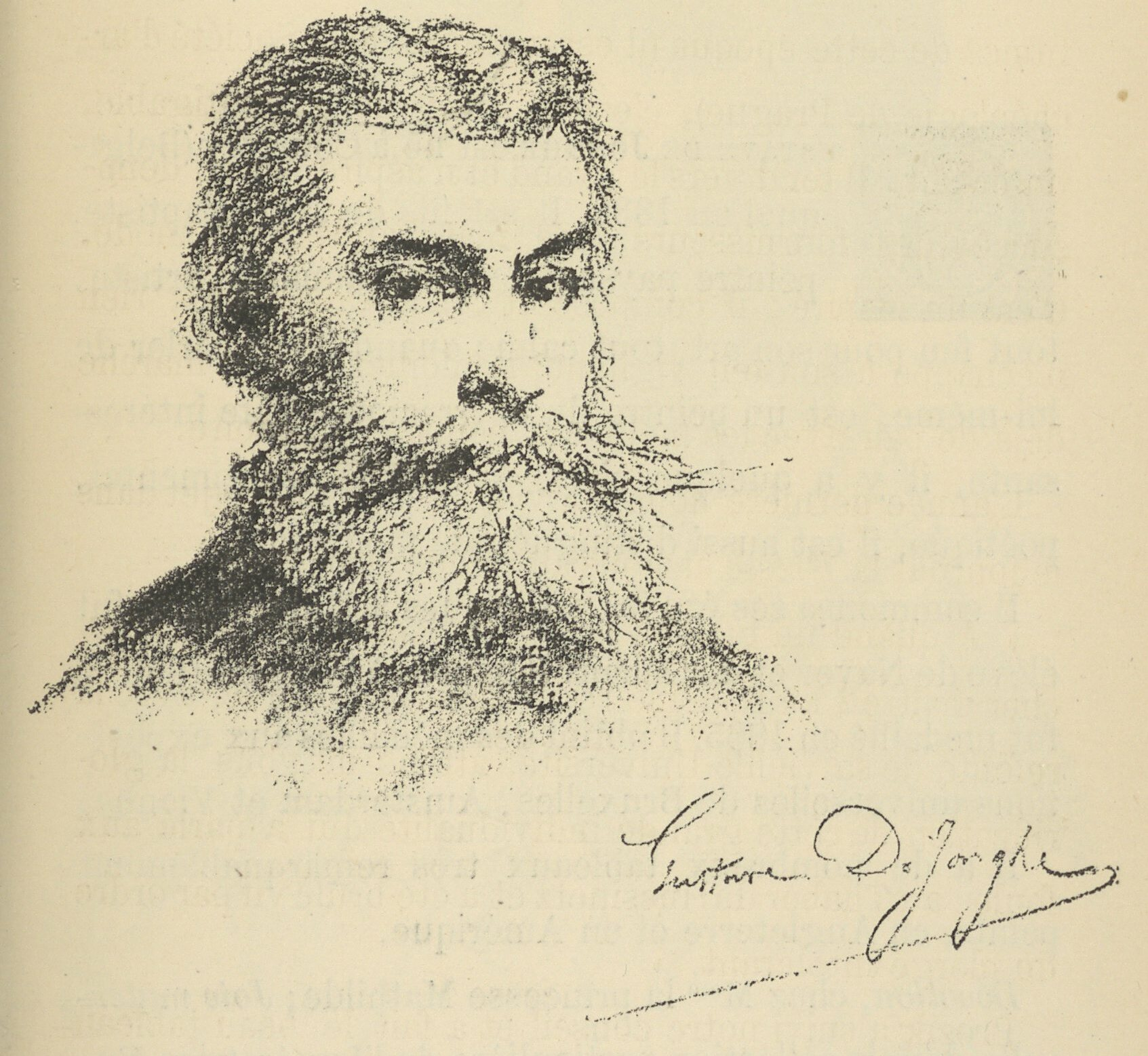
- Self-portrait, from Nos peintres dessinés par eux-mêmes: notes humoristiques et esquisses biographiques (1883)
- Born: 4 February 1829; Kortrijk, United Kingdom of the Netherlands
- Died: 28 January 1893 (aged 63); Antwerp, Belgium
- Education: Académie Royale des Beaux-Arts, Brussels
- Movement: Social realism, Realism, Orientalism

Gustave Léonard de Jonghe, Gustave Léonard De Jonghe or Gustave de Jonghe (4 February 1829 – 28 January 1893) was a Flemish painter known for his glamorous society portraits and genre scenes. After training in Brussels, he started out as a painter of historical and religious subjects in a Realist style. After moving to Paris where he spent most of his active career, he became successful with his scenes of glamorous women in richly decorated interiors.

== Life ==
Gustave Léonard de Jonghe was born in Kortrijk as the son of the prominent landscape painter Jan Baptiste de Jonghe. He received his first art lessons from his father. He continued his studies in Brussels at the Académie Royale des Beaux-Arts where leading Belgian painter François-Joseph Navez was one of his teachers. The history painter Louis Gallait was his close friend and mentor. When de Jonghe’s father died when he was only 15 years old, his native city granted him a scholarship.

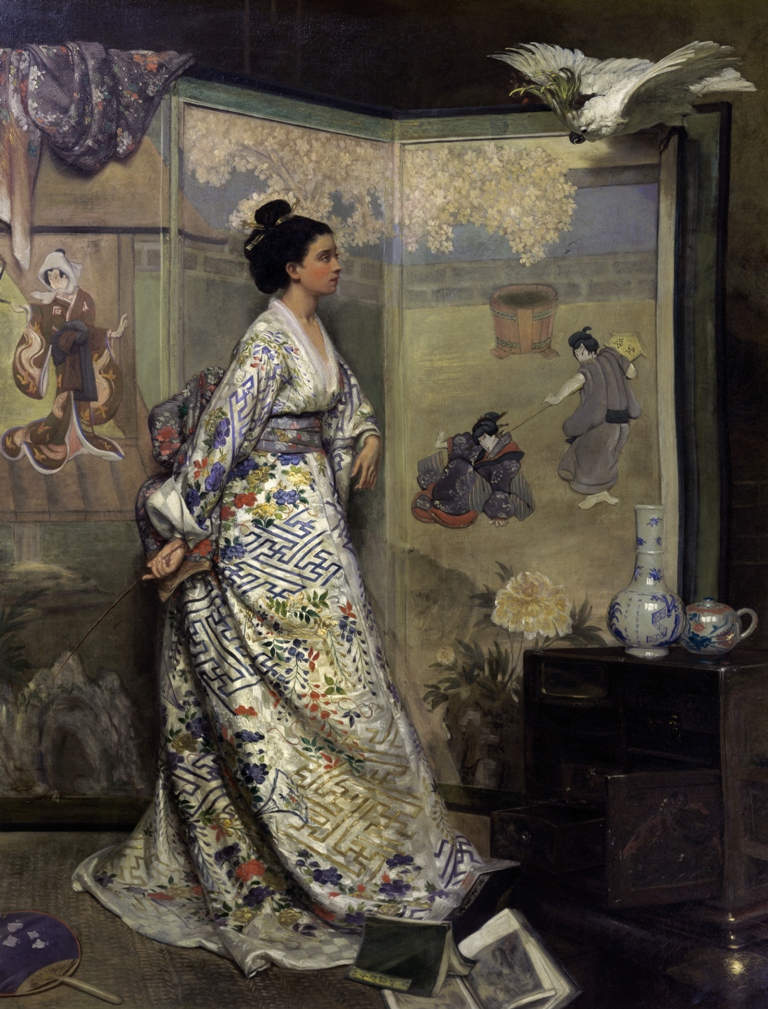
The admirer of Japan, c. 1865

From 1848 onwards, de Jonghe participated in the exhibitions of the Brussels Salon. De Jonghe emigrated to Paris and began to exhibit at the Paris Salons in the 1850s. He became a popular painter of elegant women and group portraits of the bourgeoisie. He usually preferred interior settings, in which he represented several fashionable details of the period.

In the 1870s, the artist repeatedly shuttled between Paris and Brussels. The onset of blindness in 1882 following a cerebral haemorrhage ended his artistic career and he returned to Brussels. Leading Belgian and French artists in Paris organized a charity art sale to support the ailing artist and his family. De Jonghe died in 1893 in Antwerp where he had resided since 1884.

De Jonghe was twice awarded a medal for his work: he received in 1862 a first-class medal in Amsterdam and in 1863 a third-class medal at the Paris Salon of 1863. In 1864, Belgian King Leopold I honoured him with the Order of Leopold.

== Work ==
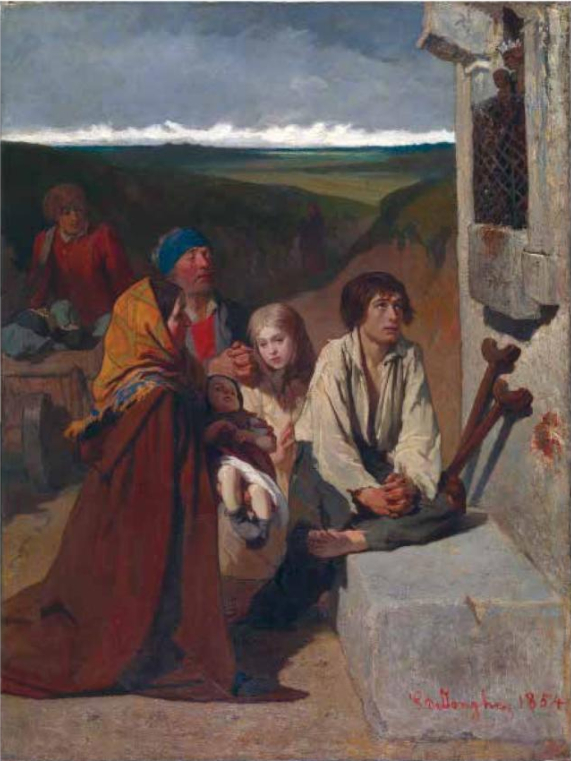
Pilgrims praying to Our Lady of the Afflicted or Our Lady of Mercy, 1854

Gustave de Jonghe's early works explored historical and religious subject matter such as his composition Pilgrims Praying to Our Lady of the Afflicted or Our Lady of Mercy of 1854 (Royal Museums of Fine Arts of Belgium). This large canvas was presented at the Brussels Salon of 1854 and was at the time regarded as an important flag of revolt against the old classics, romantics and academics in Belgian art. The work was considered by artists of that time as a manifesto for the liberation of art as well as the beginning of Realism in Belgian art. It was also noted that this work showed similarities with the work of the French Social Realist painter Charles de Groux who worked in Brussels.

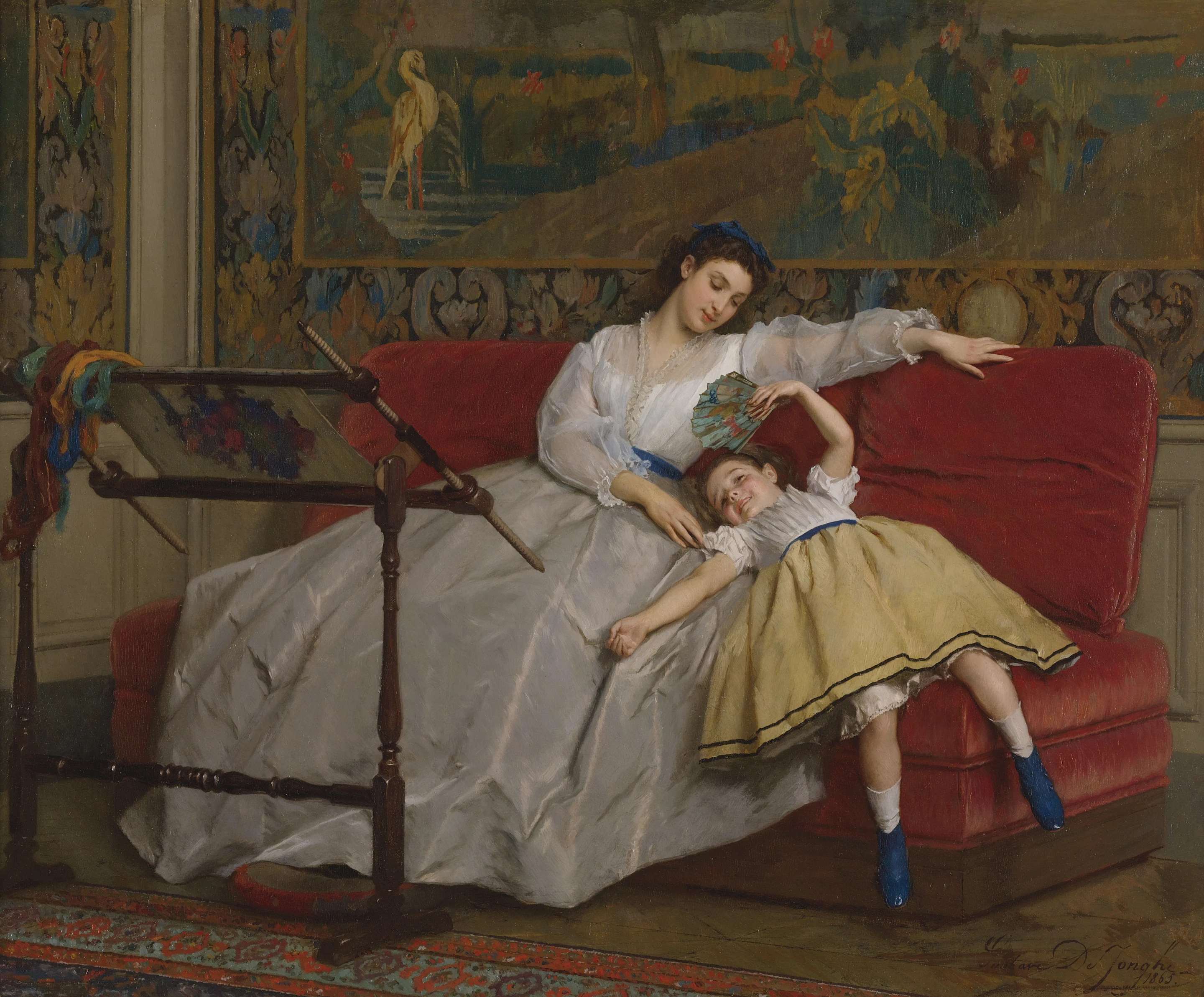
Mother with her young daughter, 1865

Subsequently de Jonghe left the course of Realism and changed his subject matter to portraits and genre scenes and the occasional landscape. He worked in oil as well as watercolour. While some of his works are found in international museums such as the Hermitage and the Musée d'Orsay, most of his work is held in private collections.

His portrait paintings depict the lifestyle of the contemporary, fashionable city dwellers. This was a fashion started by Belgian painter Alfred Stevens in the late 1850s and then followed by another Belgian painter Charles Baugniet, the Frenchman Auguste Toulmouche and de Jonghe himself. By the late 1860s there was a ready market for genre scenes with bourgeois figures, usually young glamorous women, in luxurious surroundings. With the onset of the Belle Epoque in the 1870s, this type of painting depicting fashionable women set in an interior became popular at the Paris Salon.

Gustave de Jonghe painted many scenes of mothers with their children (usually a daughter) in intimate settings. Through the choice of pose, clothing and setting de Jonghe characterized the type of person represented. The title of his paintings often hinted at the narrative of the picture, such as Going to the ball. His pictures aimed to evoke the quiet joys of family life among the prosperous bourgeoisie.

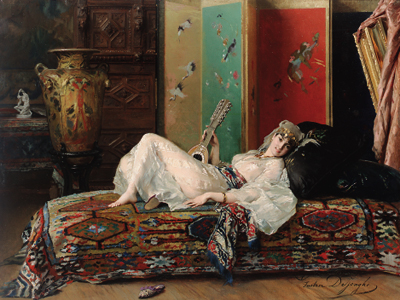
The Afternoon Siesta (A Reclining Odalisque), c. 1870

His work reflects contemporary tastes in art such as the Japonism craze of the latter half of the 19th century with its interest in Japanese art and artifacts. His composition The admirer of Japan depicts a young woman walking in front of a Japanese screen, surrounded by other Japanese objects and catalogues of Japanese pictures.

Gustave de Jonghe also painted some Orientalist compositions such as the Afternoon siesta (also called A reclining odalisque), which reflected the contemporary interest in the theme of the harem and the odalisque in Orientalism.

Although his work may now seem sentimental and too reflective of then prevailing tastes in the market, its lasting appeal was already recognized in his time as being the result of the sincerity and perfect taste of its execution.

== Gallery ==
Selected works

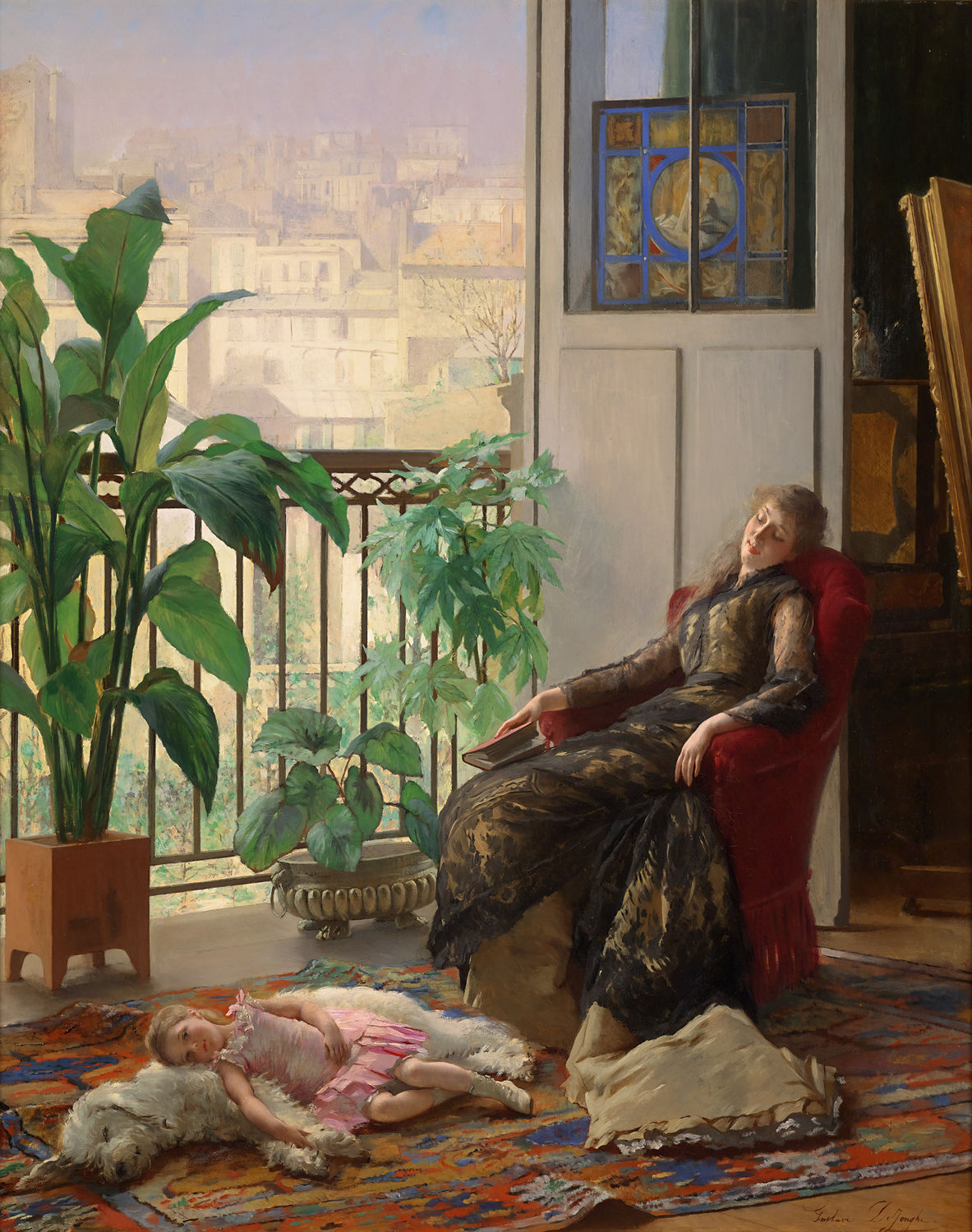
Afternoon Repose

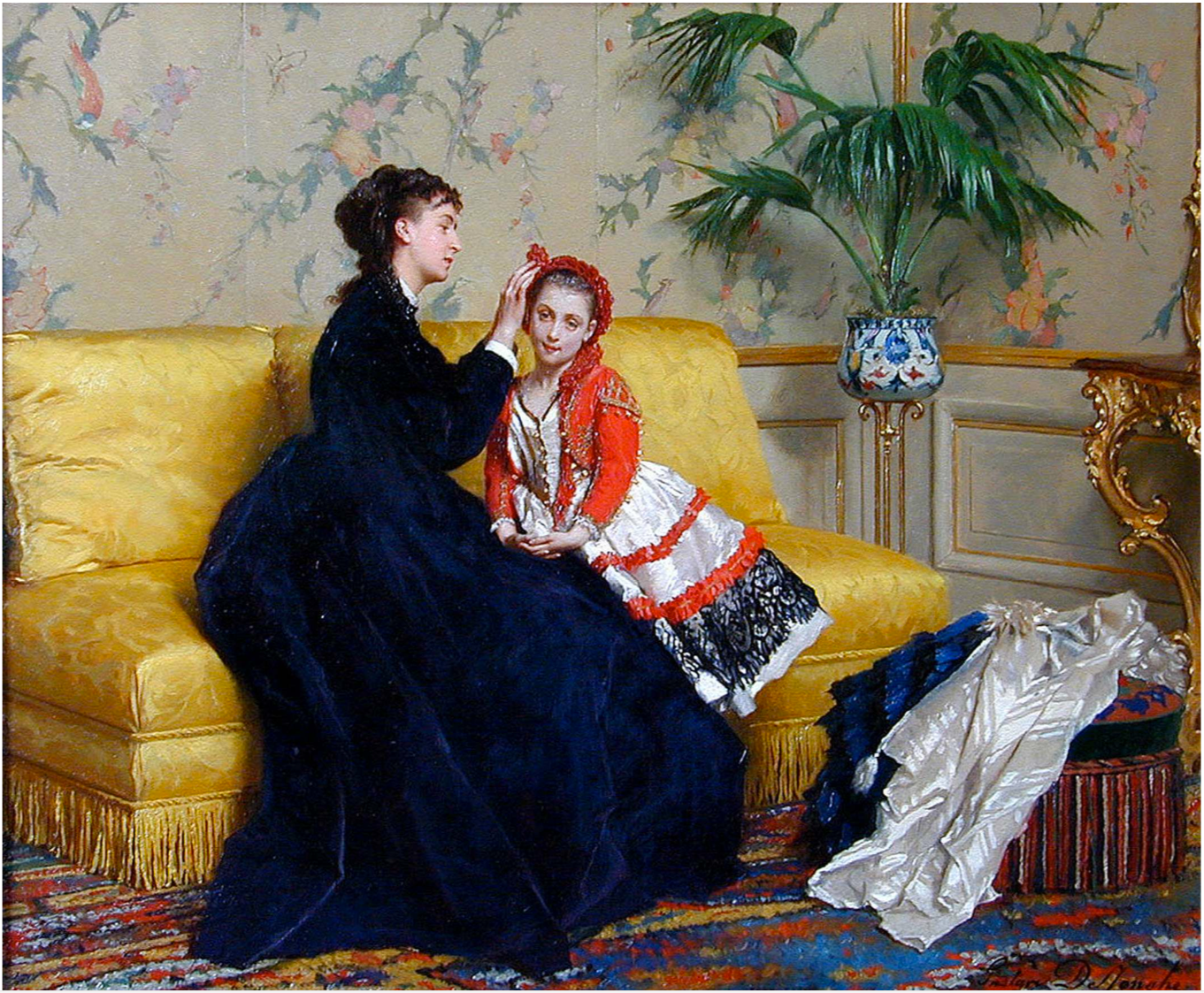
Going to the Ball

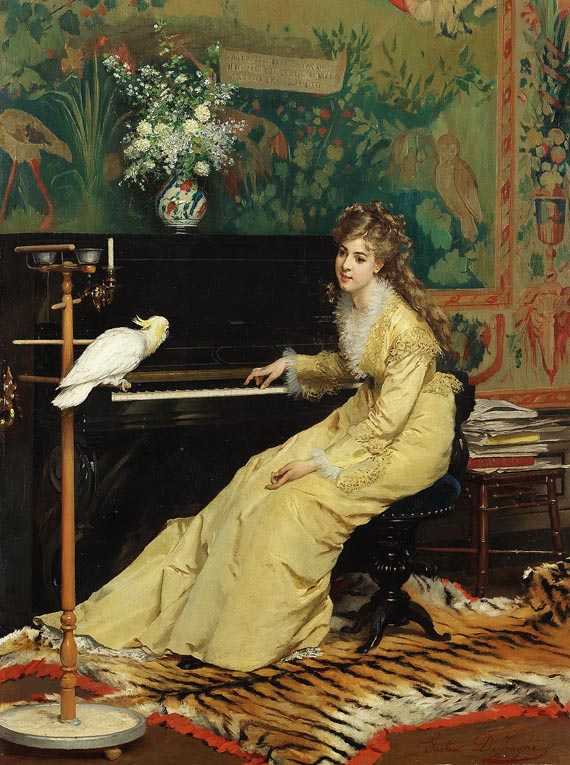
Woman at the Piano with a Cockatoo, c. 1870

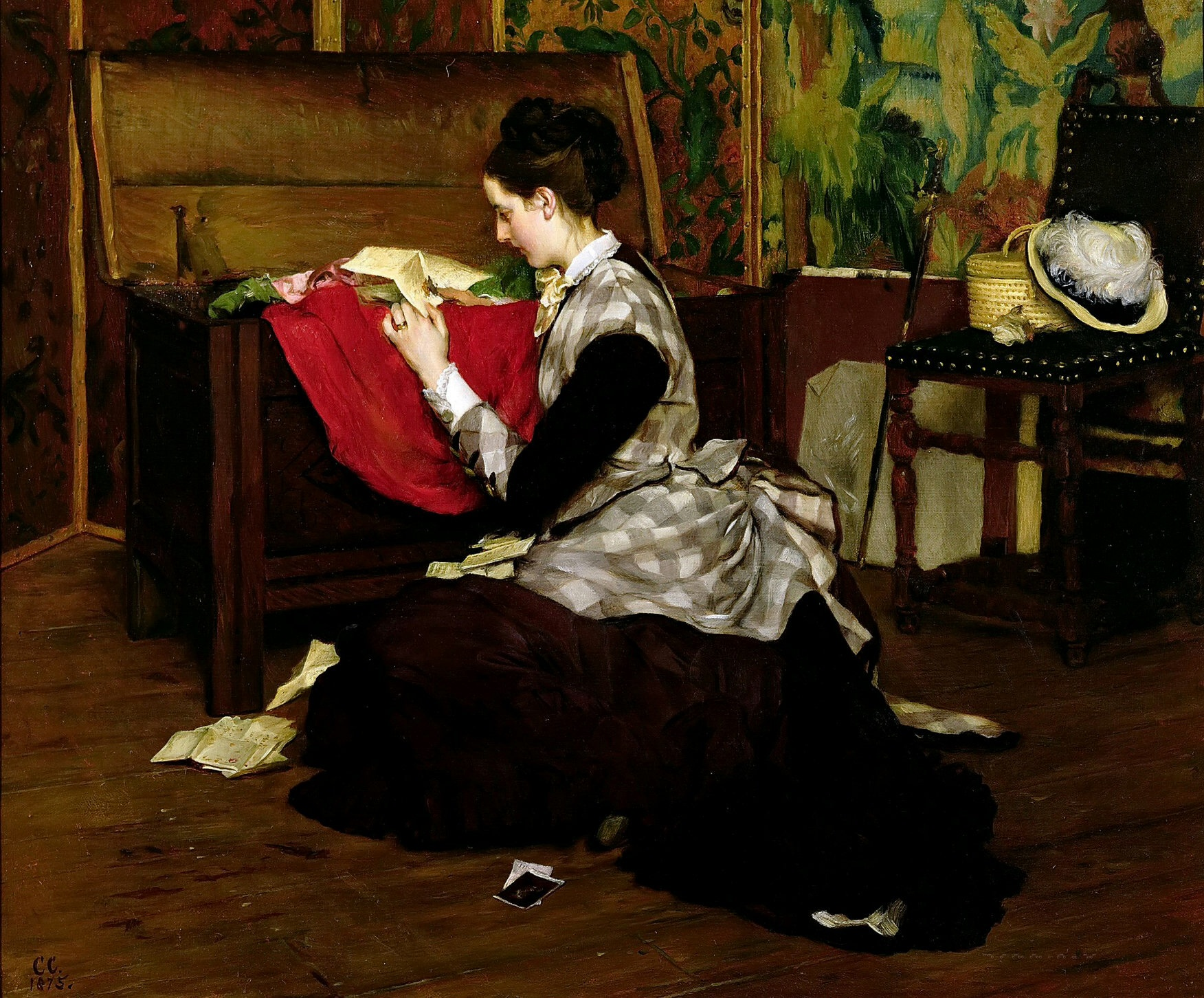
Love Letter, c. 1870

== See also ==
- List of Orientalist artists
- Orientalism
