= Louis-Pierre Verwee =

Belgian painter

- Born: Louis-Pierre Verwee; 19 March 1807; Kortrijk, First French Empire
- Died: November 1877 (aged 70); Brussels, Belgium
- Education: Academy of Fine Arts of Kortrijk
- Occupation: Painter

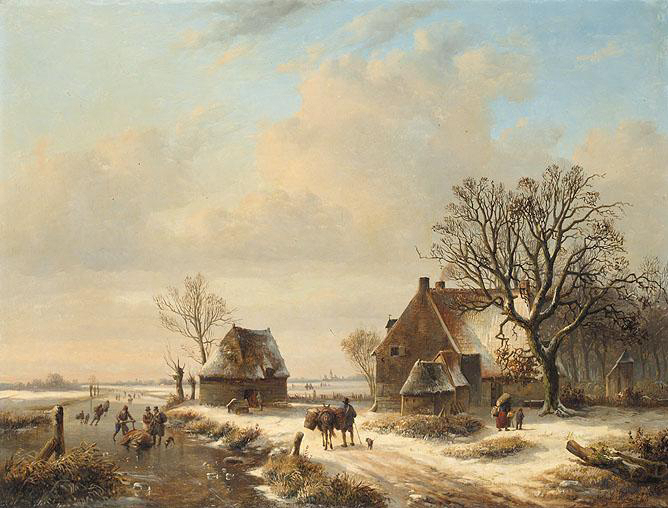
Winter landscapes with ice skaters, figures by Eugène Verboeckhoven

Louis-Pierre Verwee or Louis Pierre Verwée (Kortrijk, 19 March 1807 – Brussels, November 1877) was a Belgian painter known for his rural landscapes with cattle and winter landscapes. He is the principal representative of the Romantic school in Belgian landscape painting characterised by a return to nature.

Louis-Pierre Verwée, Landscape (1836)

== Life ==
Louis-Pierre Verwee was born in Kortrijk. He abandoned school prematurely to become a student at the Academy of Fine Arts of Kortrijk. His instructors there included prominent landscape and animal painter Jan Baptiste de Jonghe (1785–1844). He later studied with the landscape and animal painter Eugène Verboeckhoven in Ghent. He established a lifelong friendship with Verboeckhoven and the two artists regularly created artworks together. He followed Verboeckhoven to Brussels.

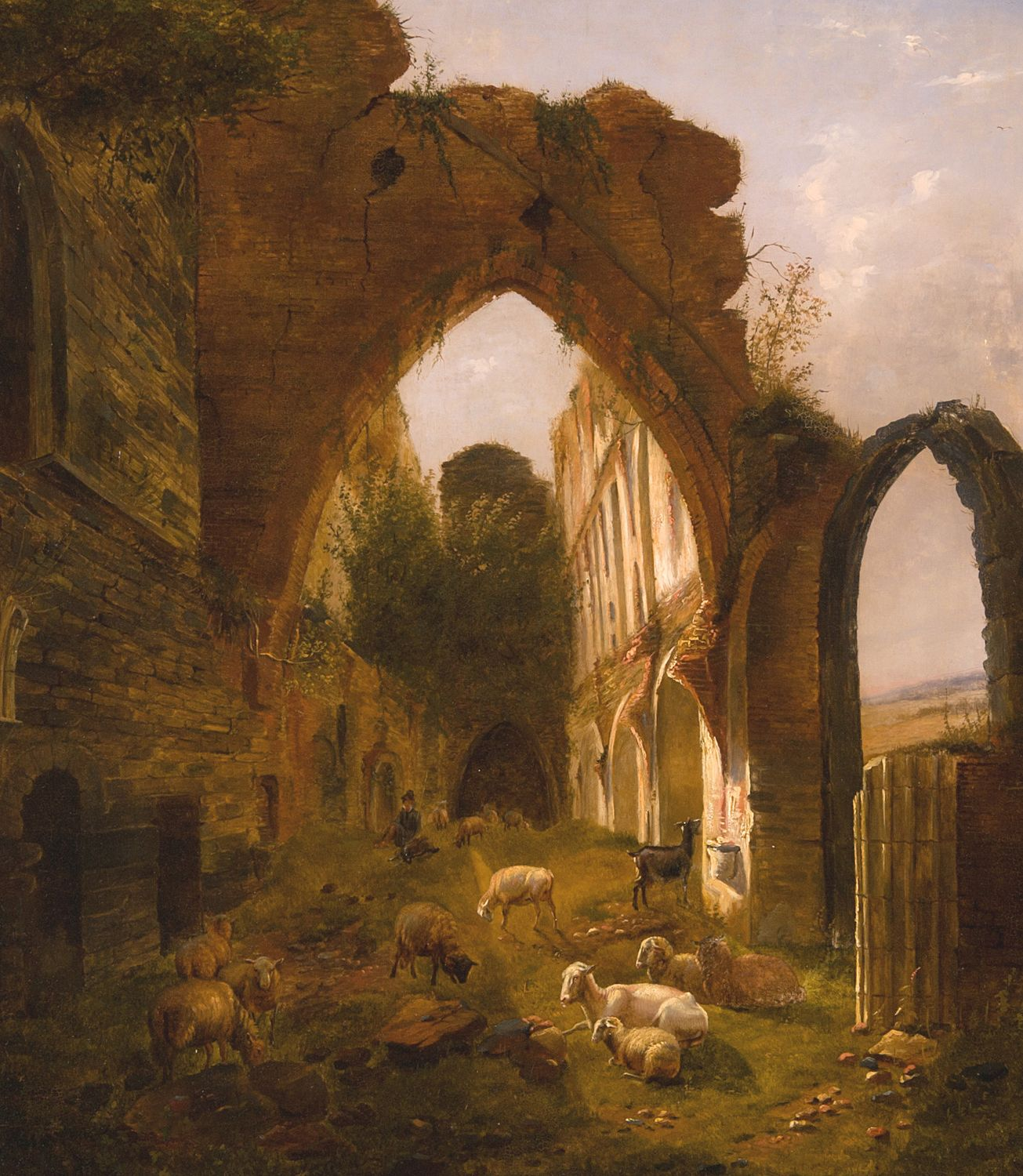
Sheep among the ruins of Villers-la-Ville

Later in his life he traveled through Germany, France and the Netherlands and stayed in London from 1867 to 1868. He was a friend of Constant Troyon and Gustave Courbet.

He married Claire van der Smissen, with whom he had one daughter and three sons, two of whom became painters: Alfred Verwee became an internationally renowned animal painter and Louis-Charles Verwee was a genre and portrait painter.

== Work ==
Louis-Pierre Verwee was a landscape and animal painter. His early works are similar to those of his master Verboeckhoven, to the extent that it is often difficult to distinguish their work. Verboeckhoven sometimes painted the figures and animals in Verwee's pictures.

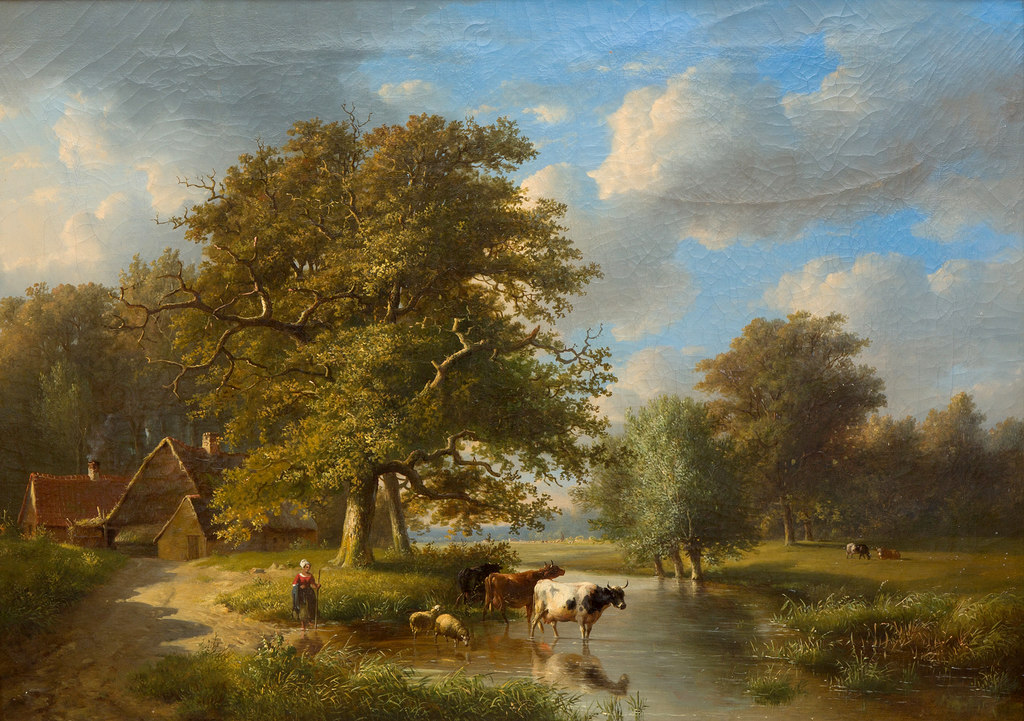
Wooded river landscape with shepherdess and cattle

Verwee's paintings of forests and rivers are in the stereotypical, romantic way that can be found in the landscapes of the painters Andreas Schelfhout (1787–1870), Barend Cornelis Koekkoek (1803–1862), Frans Keelhoff (1820–1893) and Johann Bernard Klombeck (1815–1893).

In the later part of his career he strived for innovation, but from 1837 onwards he became stuck in ever-changing winter landscapes. This type of winter landscapes had become popular due to the work of Barend Cornelis Koekkoek and Andreas Schelfhout. Louis-Pierre Verwee depicted these landscapes with low-hanging, heavy snow clouds over wintry land and waterways and dotted with figures. He used light blue and metallic gray in his color palette in an effort to suggest the intimate, moody aspect of such landscapes. In some of these paintings Florent Willems and Verboeckhoven painted the figures.

He made a number of lithographs after works of Eugène Verboeckhoven.
