= Knokke =

Section of Knokke-Heist, Belgium

- Town
- Interactive map of Knokke
- Coordinates: 51°20′47″N 3°17′16″E
- Country: Belgium
- Region: Flanders
- Province: West Flanders
- Municipality: Knokke-Heist

Population (2007)
  - Total: 15,708
- Time zone: UTC+1 (CET)
  - Summer (DST): UTC+2 (CEST)
- Postal code: 8300

Knokke (Dutch pronunciation: [ˈknɔkə]) is a town in the municipality of Knokke-Heist, which is located in the province of West Flanders in Flanders, Belgium. The town itself has 15,708 inhabitants (as of 2007).

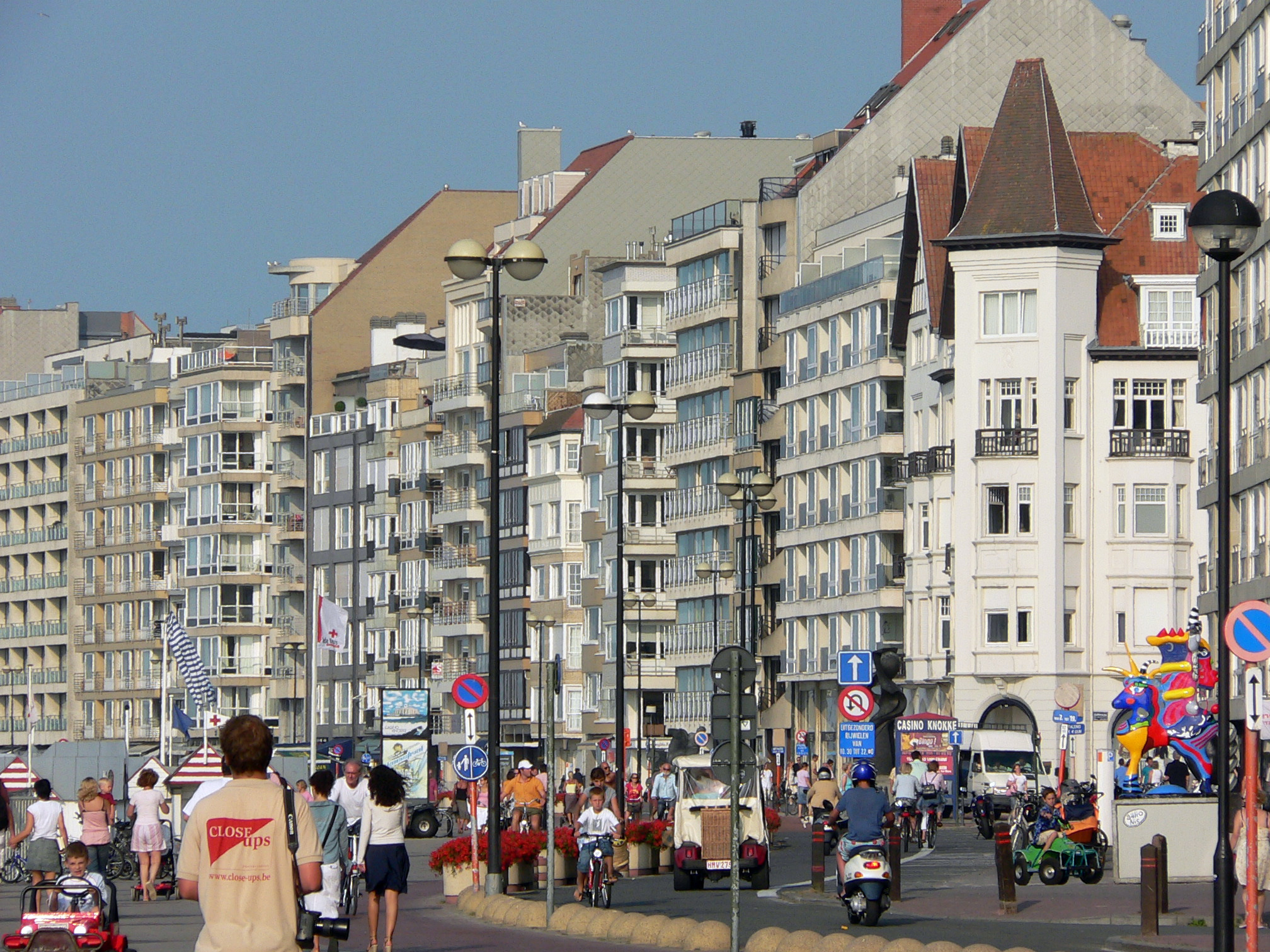
The Promenade on Het Zoute

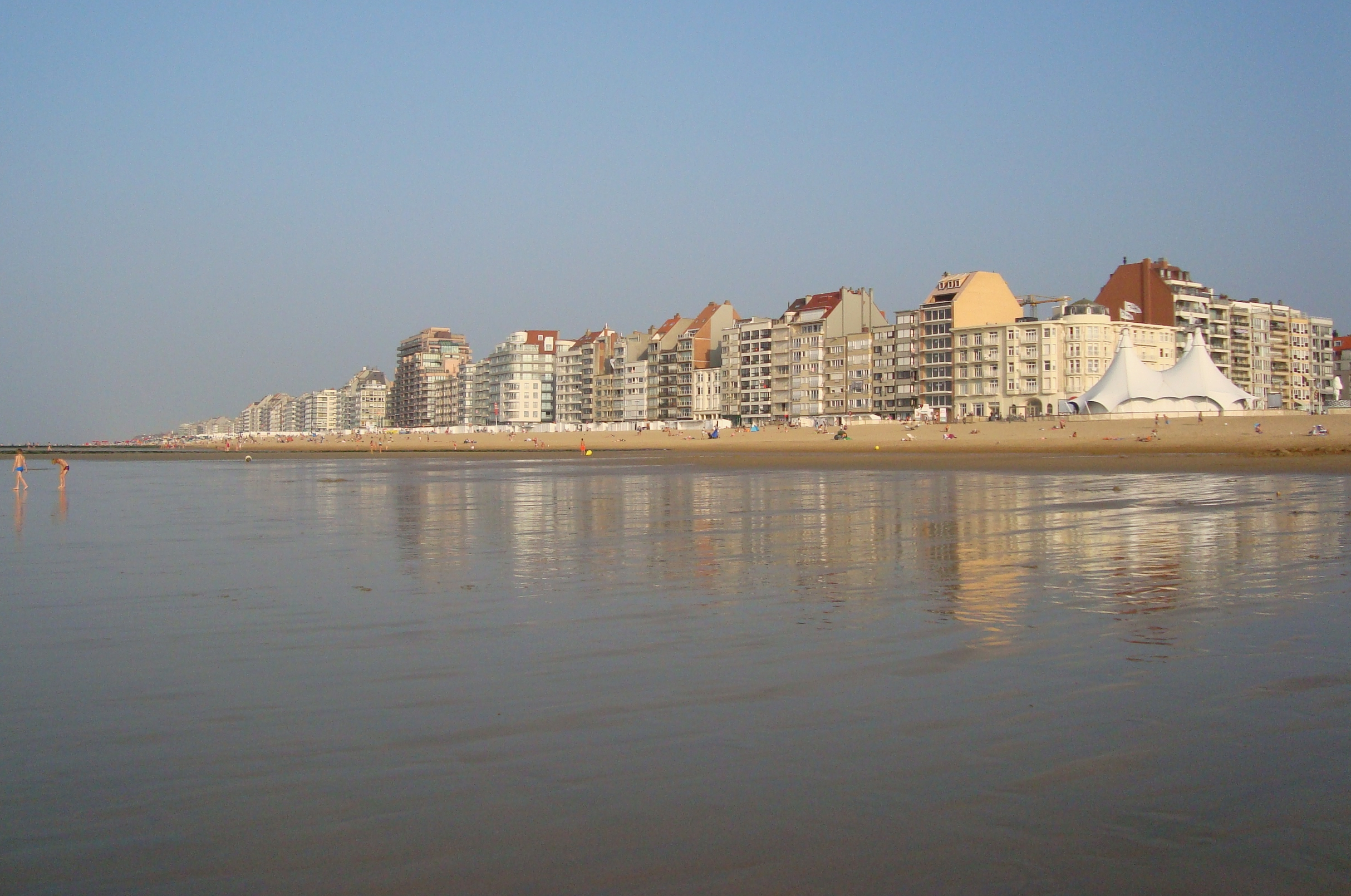
Knokke beach resort

Knokke is the most north-eastern seaside resort on the Belgian coast. It lies adjacent to the Dutch border; separated from the Dutch territory by the Zwin nature reserve. Knokke came into existence as a result of the construction of dikes that were to protect the area around the 'Zwin' sea-arm.

Originally a vacation haven for the city folk of Brussels in the early 19th century, artists such as James Ensor, Alfred Verwee and others started to frequent the small hamlet to paint its vistas. The artists rented a small miller's cottage and founded the Cercle des Artistes in 1880. It gradually became a resort town with upscale clientele, restaurants and shops. St. George's Anglican Church serves the English-speaking community.

Nowadays Knokke is known for its beaches and for the dike system to which it owes its origins. The largest of Belgium's ten casinos, Knokke Casino, is located on a seaside promenade and is open 20 hours a day.

The town lies at the northern end of the Belgian Coast Tram line and is also served by NMBS trains at Knokke railway station. The N34 connects Knokke to De Panne.

== In popular culture ==
Knokke is mentioned in the Jacques Brel song, "Jacky (La Chanson de Jacky)": Even if one day in Knokke-le-Zoute/I become, as I fear/Singer for old women... It does not feature in the English language version written by Mort Shuman.

In the 1970s the town was the host of the light entertainment competition for the Golden Sea swallow of Knokke. In 1976 the British entry, BBC's The Norman Wisdom Show, won first prize.

The 2023 Belgian-Flemish television series Knokke Off was filmed and set in Knokke.

== Gallery ==
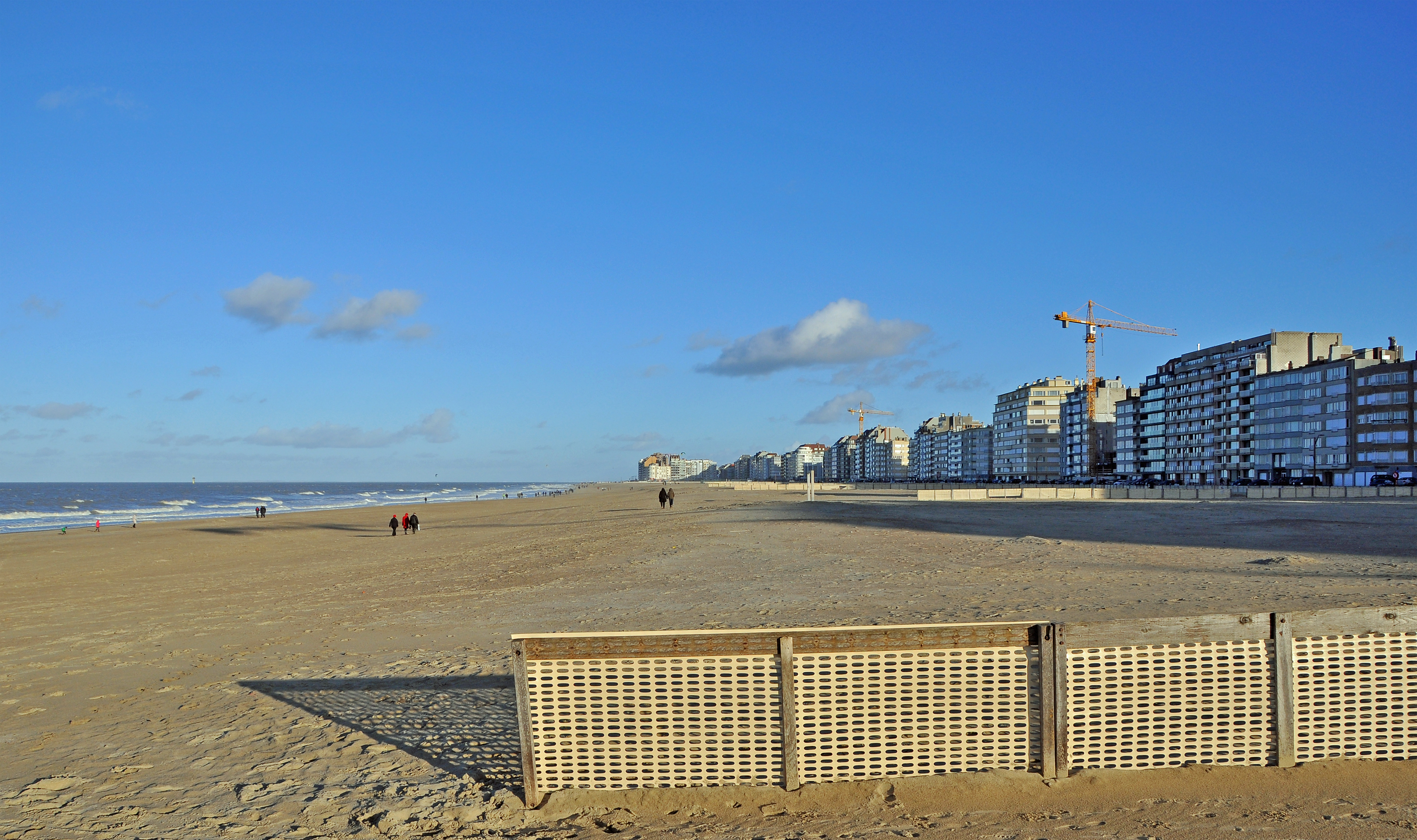
Beach

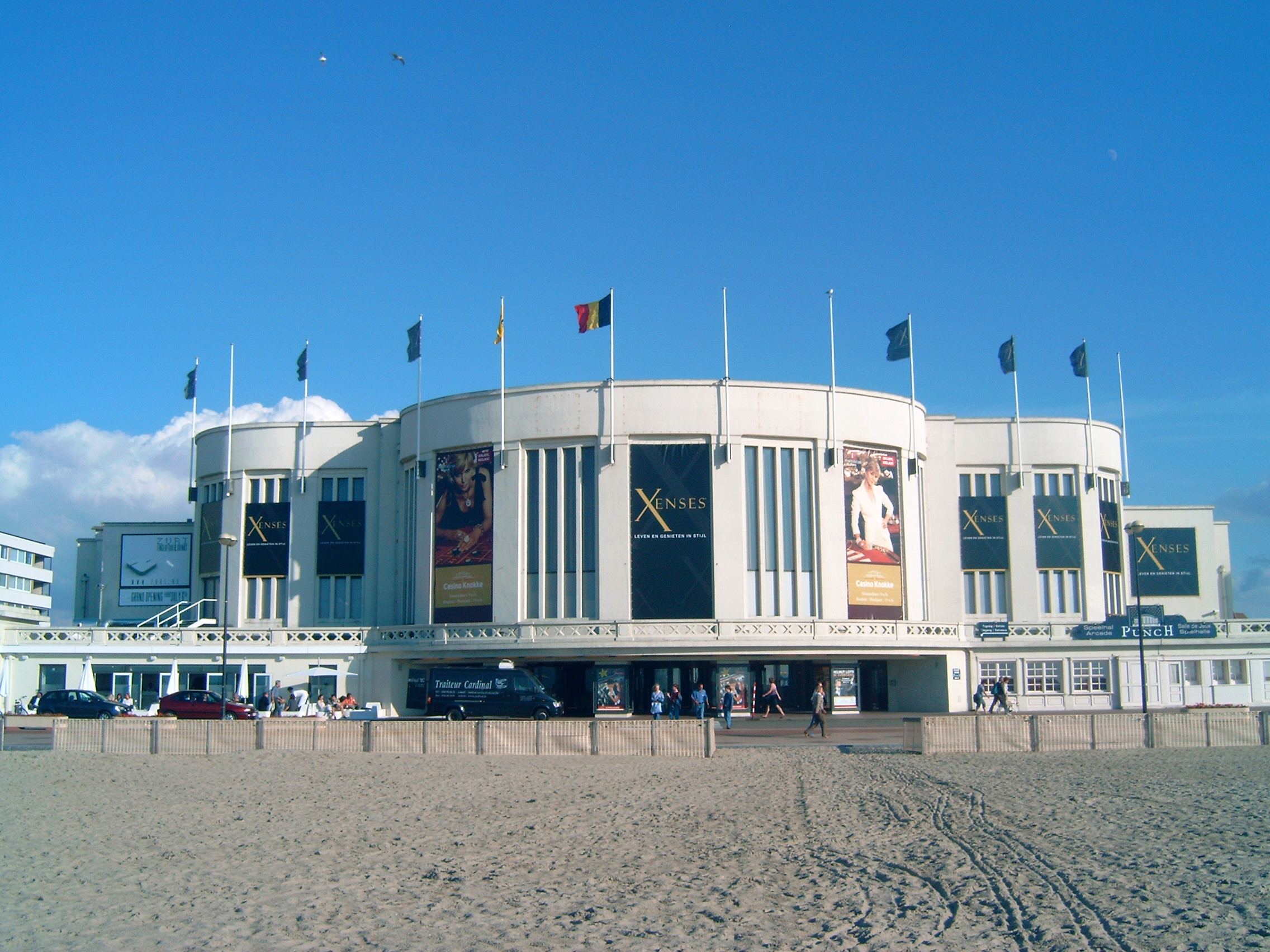
Casino

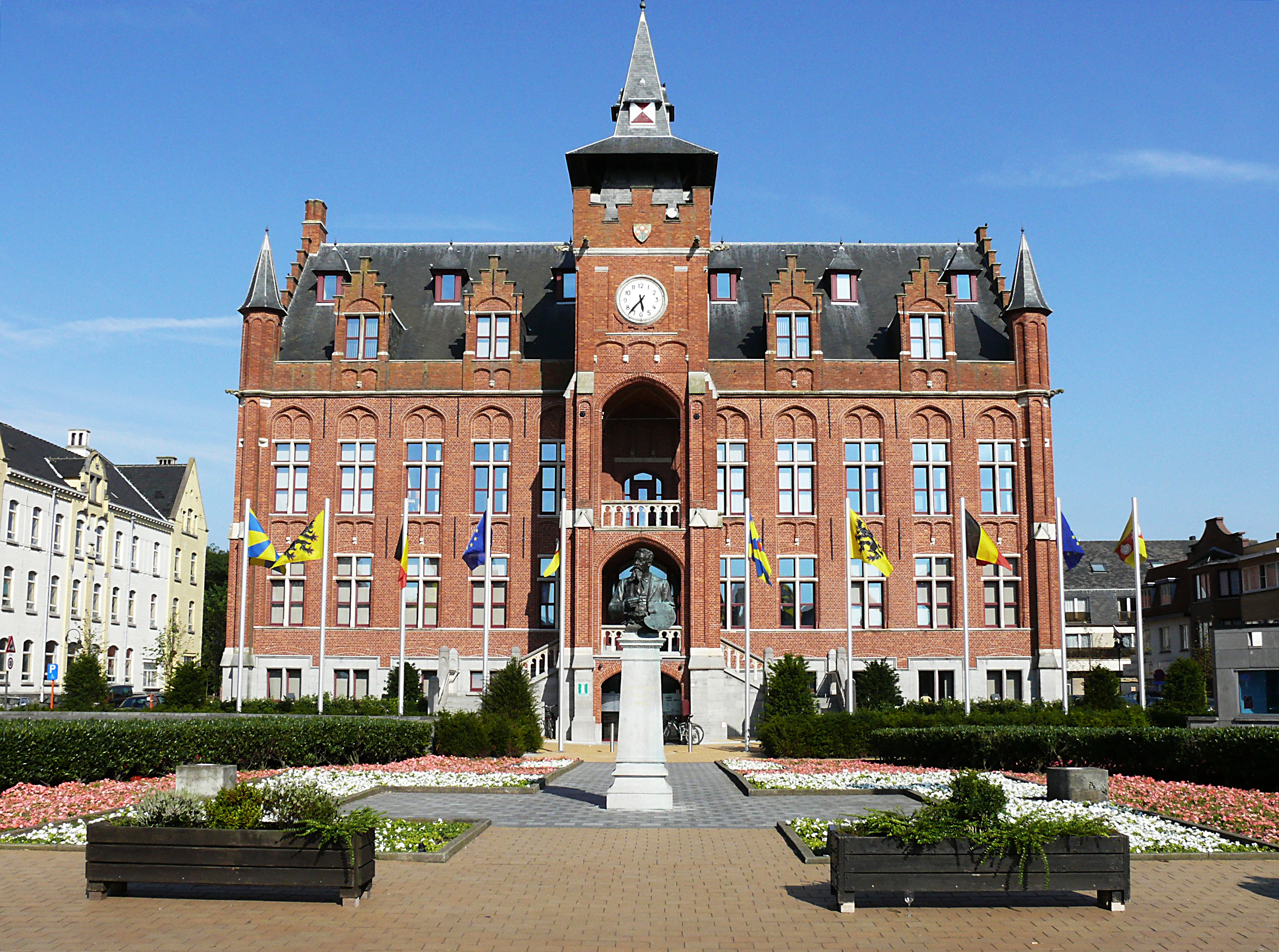
Townhall

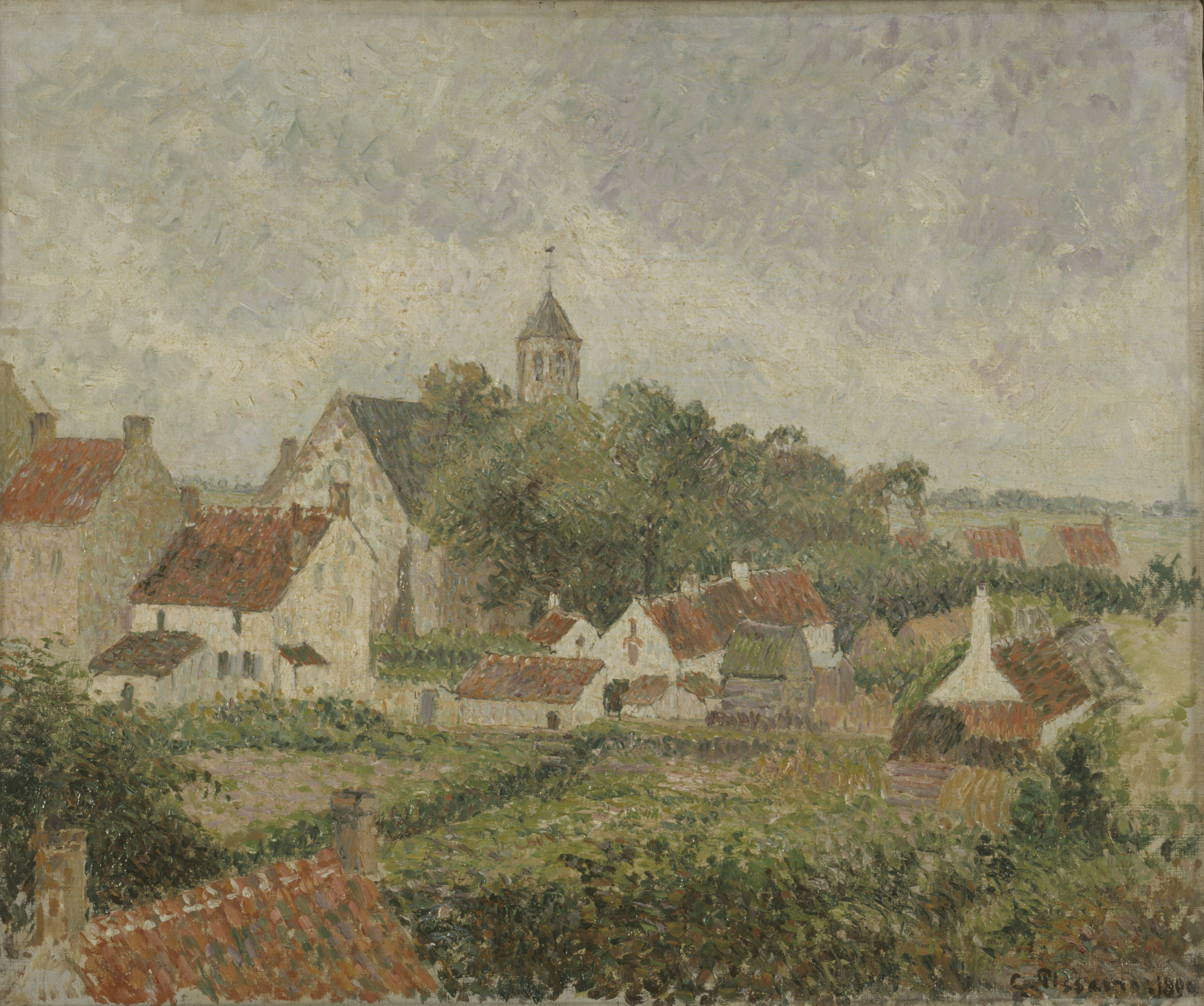
Painting of one time village

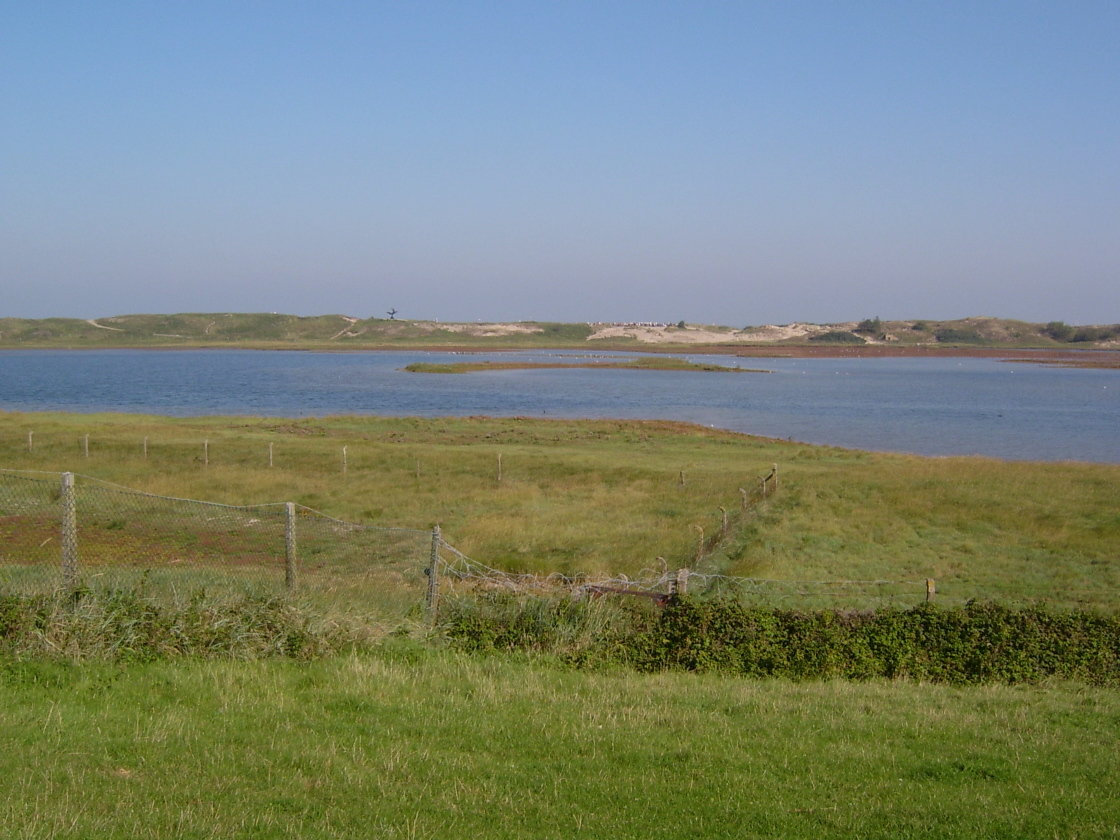
The Zwin nature reserve

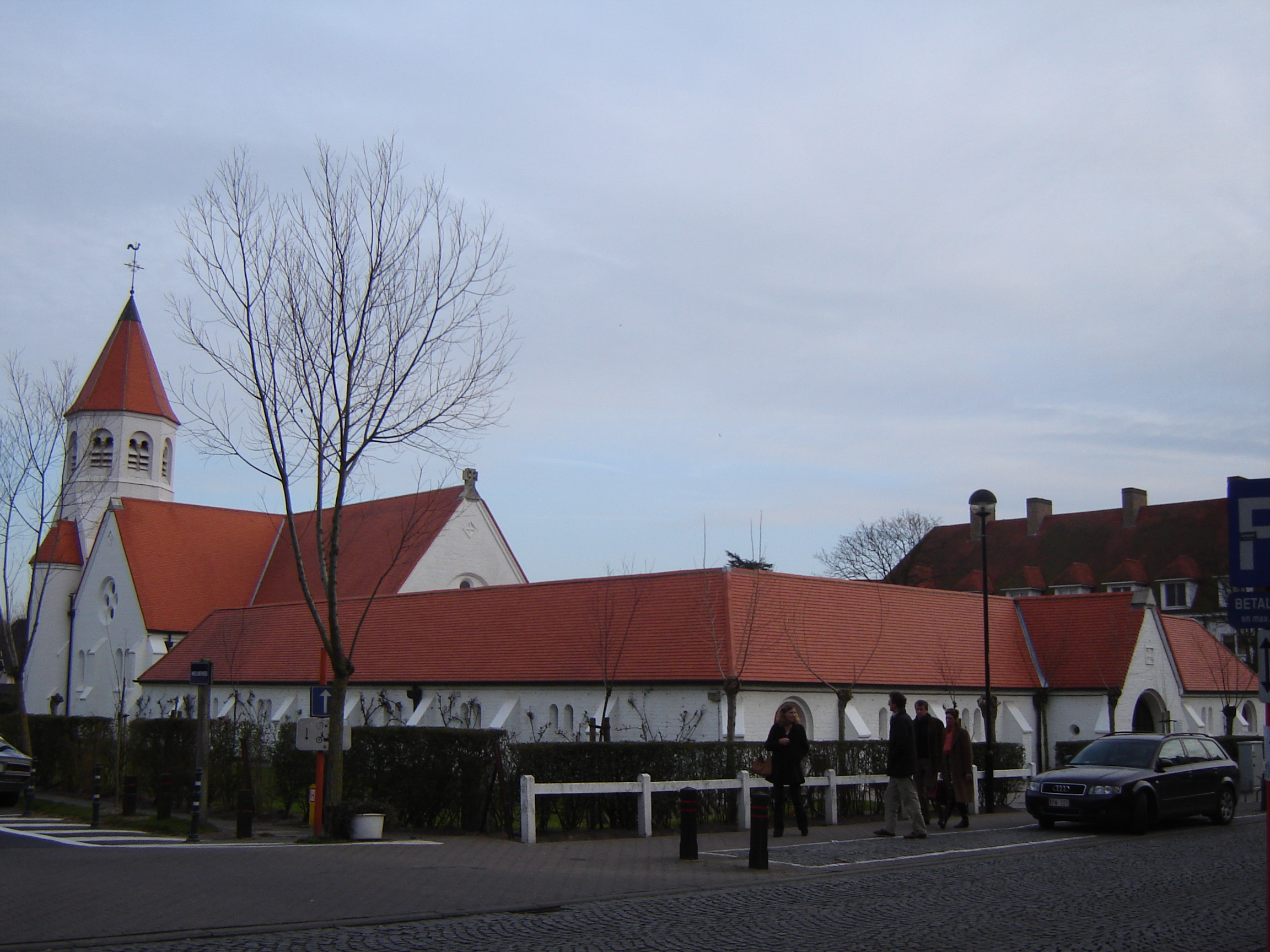
Dominican church

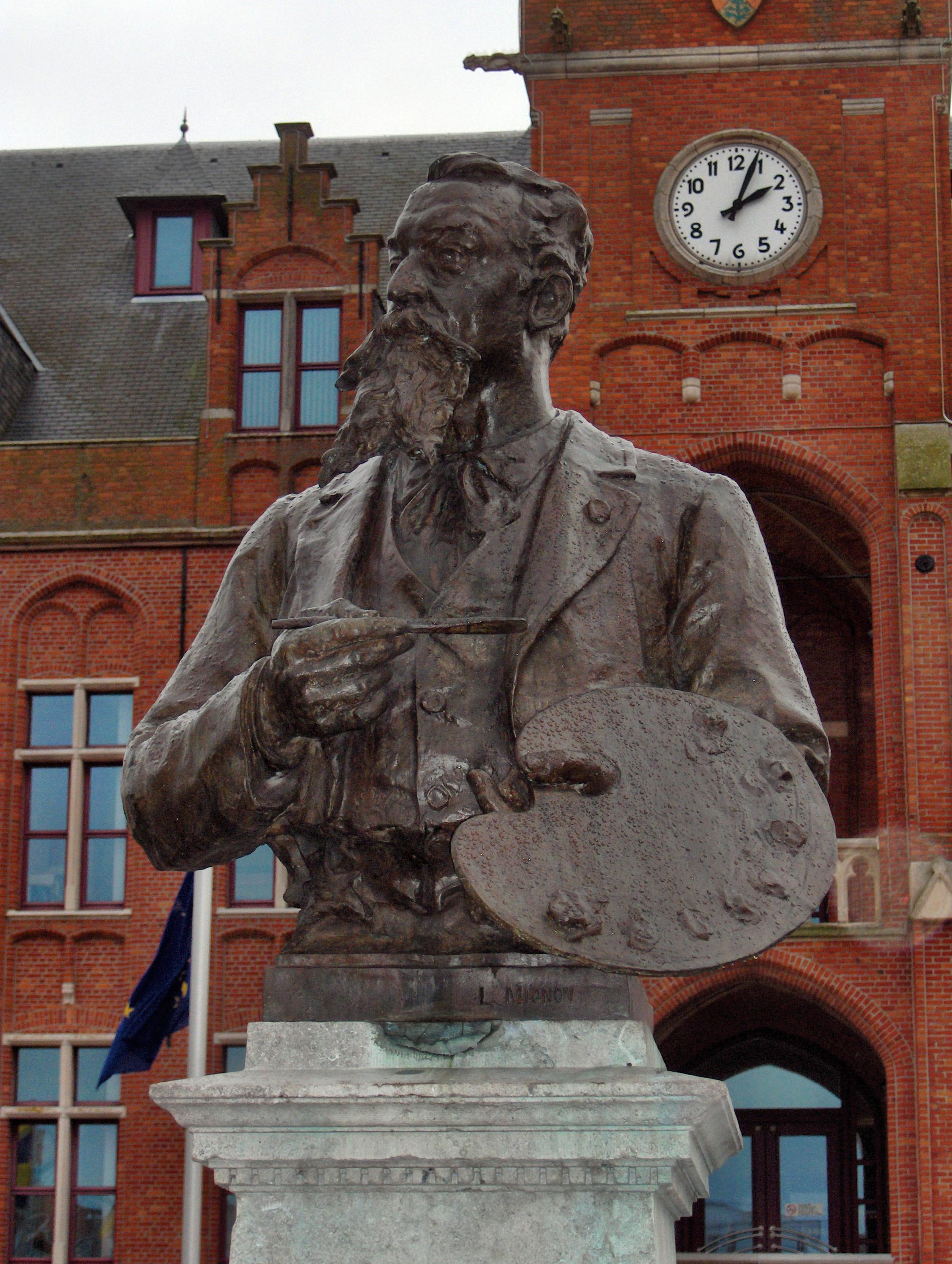
Sculpture of Alfred Verwee

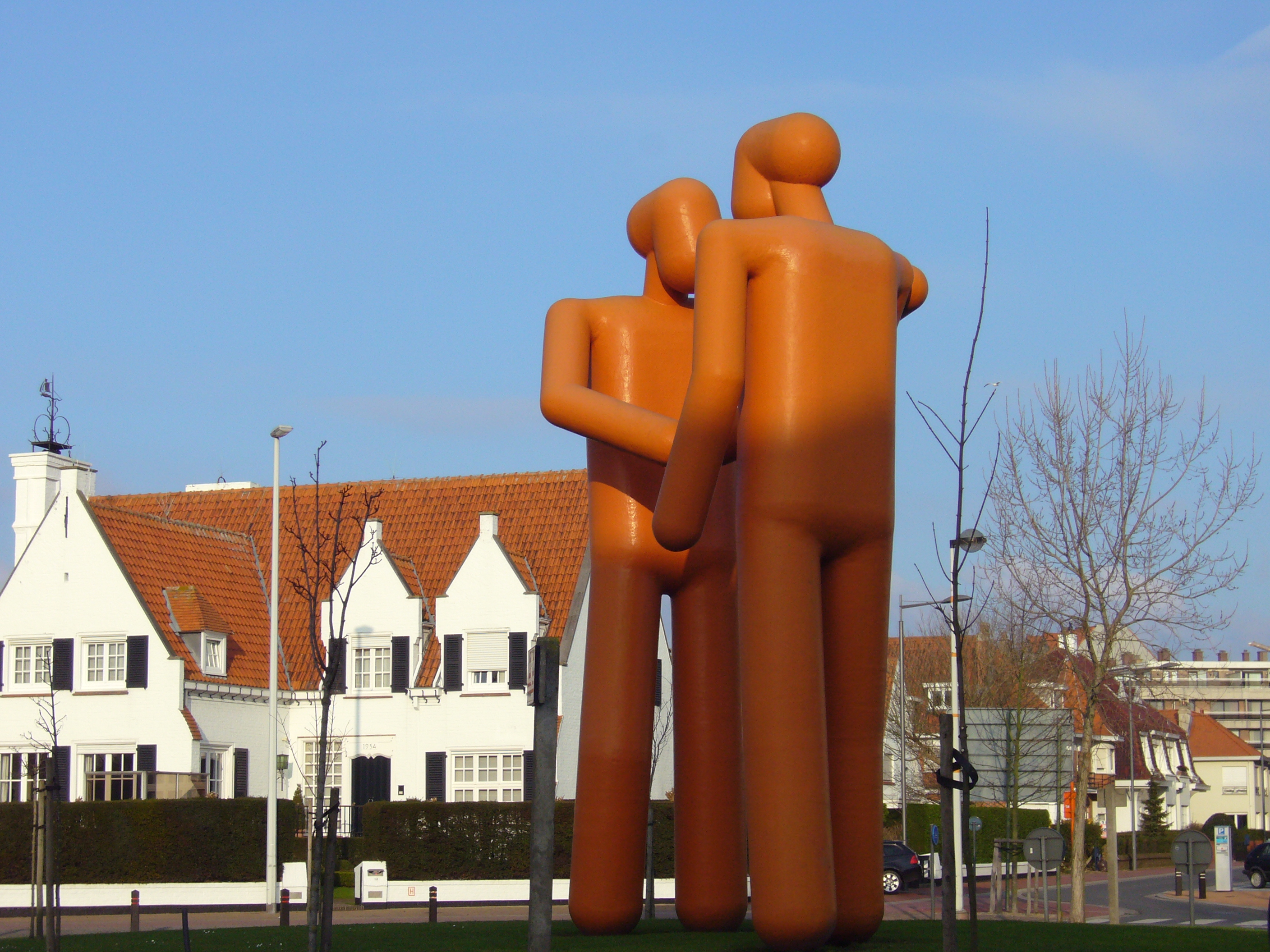
Sculpture by Joep van Lieshout

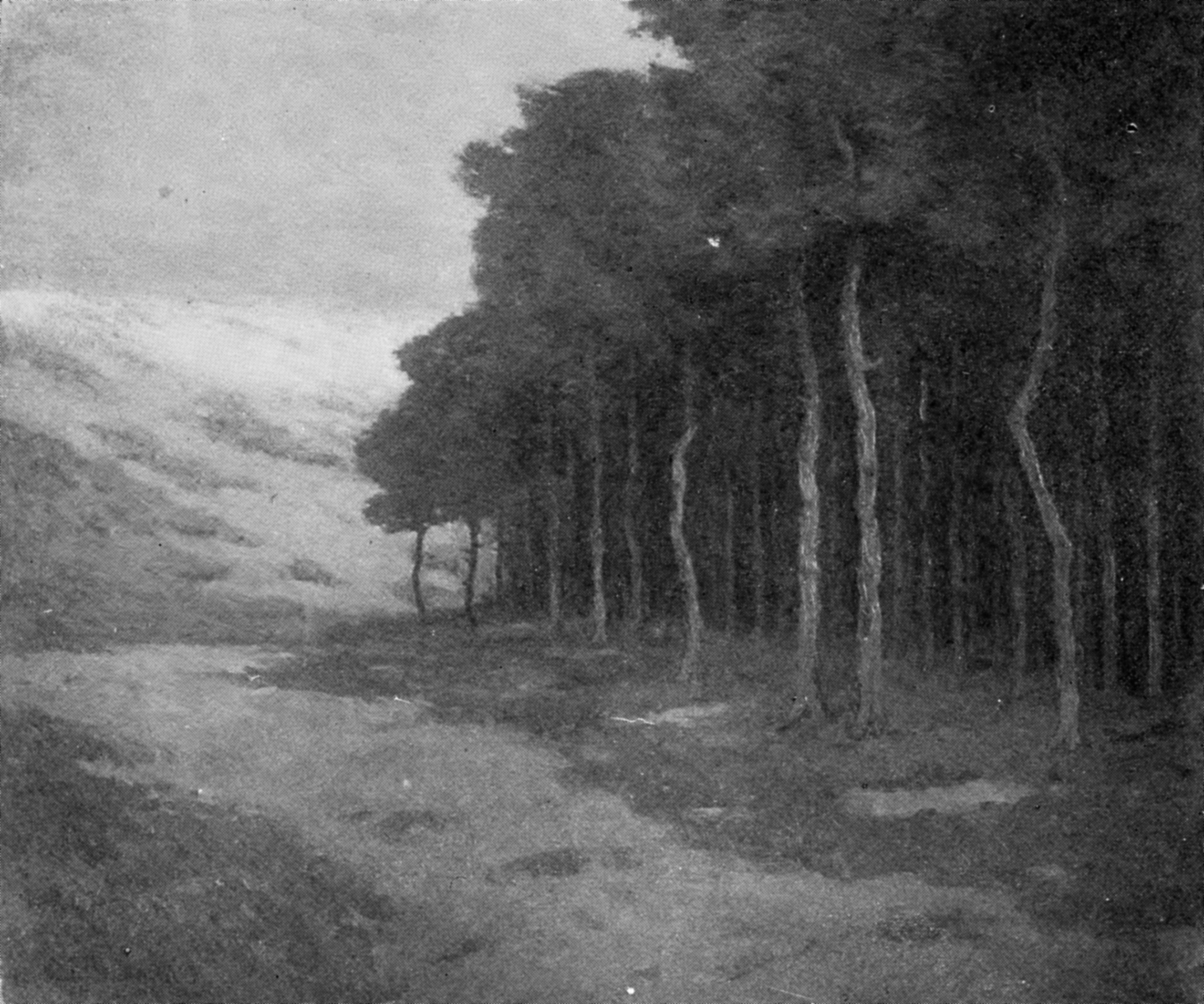
Pines at Knocke by Charles Warren Eaton

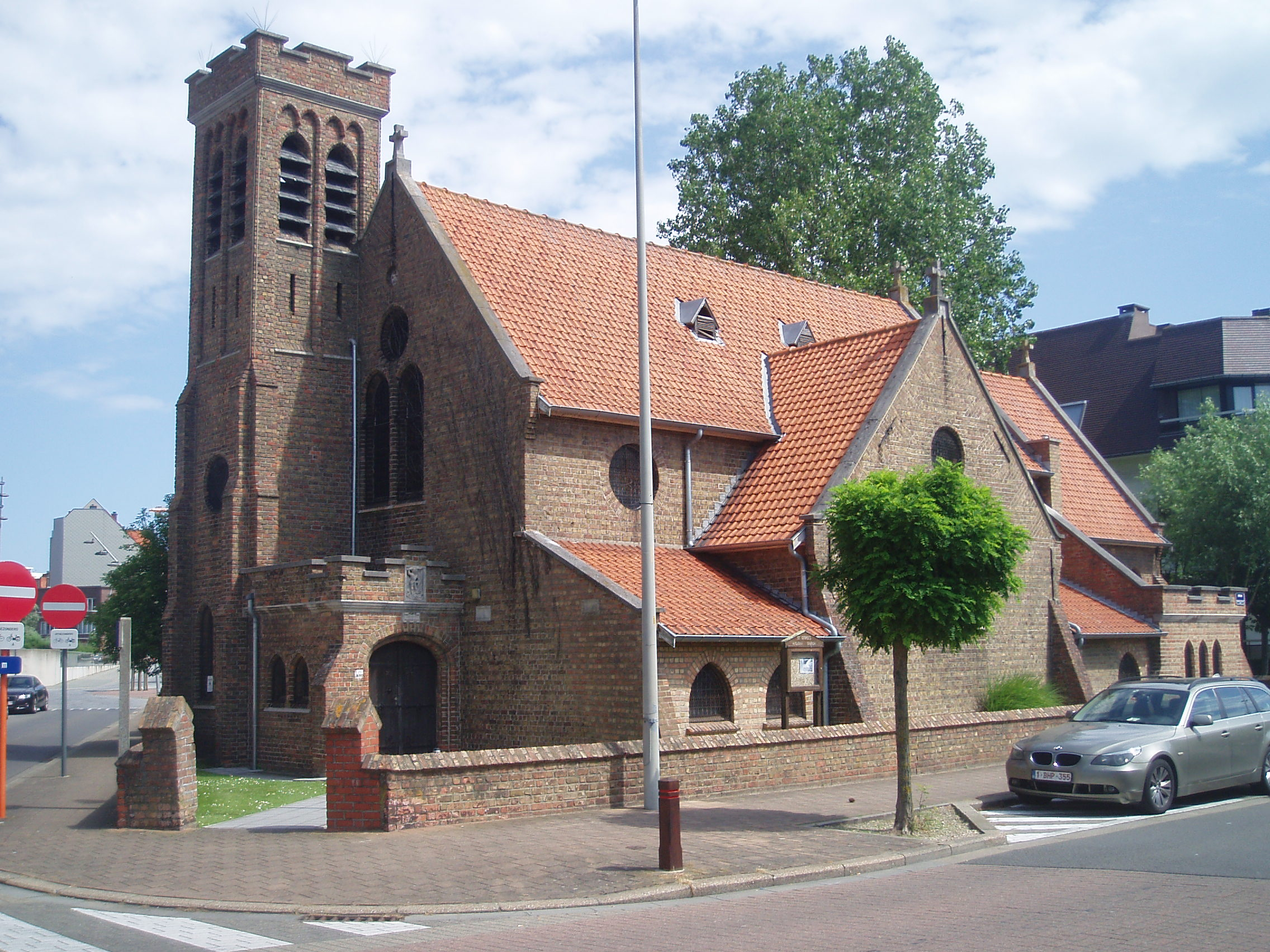
St George's Anglican Church

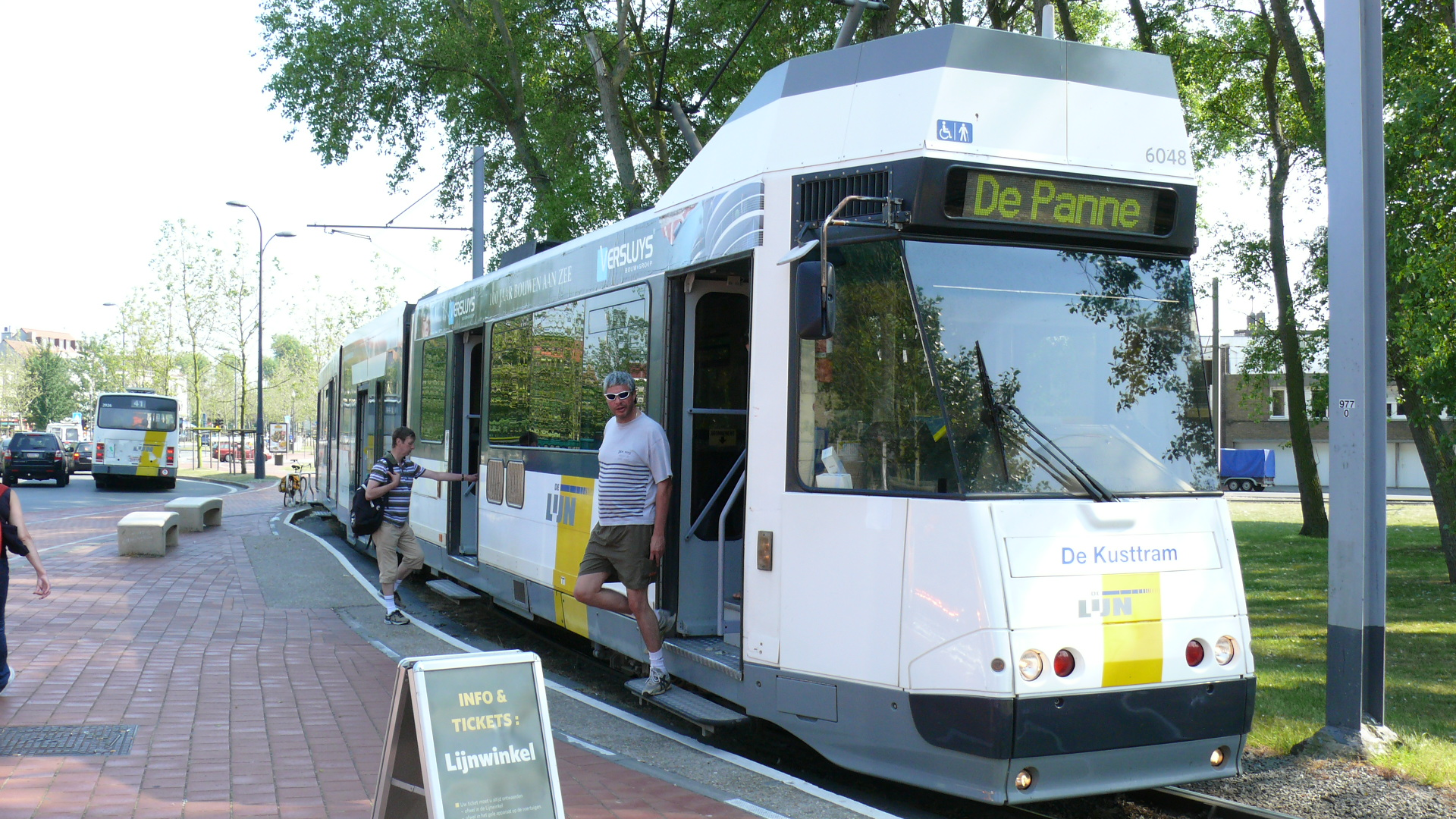
Tram
