= Gum =

Gum or GUM may refer to:

== Viscous or sticky substances ==
- Chewing gum, designed to be chewed without being swallowed
  - Bubble gum, designed to be inflated out of the mouth as a sphere
  - Gum base, the masticatory delivery system
- Natural gum, a sticky substance of natural origin composed predominantly of polysaccharides
  - Gum (botany), natural gum of botanical origin
- Other exudates that solidify like natural gum, such as:
  - Resin
  - Kino
- Postage stamp gum, applied to the back of a stamp

== Arts, entertainment and media ==
- Mr. Gum, a series of novels for children by Andy Stanton, and the protagonist
- Gum, a character in the Jet Set Radio video game franchise
- Gums, a character in the British comic Monster Fun
- Great Uncle Matthew, a character in the novel Ballet Shoes by Noel Streatfeild
- Gum, a character from the 2016 adult animated film Sausage Party
- "The Gum", episode of comedy TV show Seinfeld
- Gums (film), a 1976 horror film
- Gum, a 2017 book by Nancy Willard
- Glasgow University Magazine, in Scotland
- Ghent University Museum in Belgium
- GUM, the moniker used by musician Jay Watson for solo recordings
- GUM, a 2020 album by rapper Cities Aviv

== People ==
- Gum (footballer) (Welington Pereira Rodrigues, born 1986), Brazilian footballer
- Allen Gum (born 1969), American baseball coach
- Gum Nanse (born 1947), South Korean conductor
- Gum Tayeng (fl. from 2013), an Indian politician
- Gum Yuen (1875–1943), Chinese Australian community leader
- Jay Watson (born 1991), Australian musician who records as GUM

== Other uses ==
- Gums, the soft tissue partly covering teeth
- Gum (crater), on the Moon
- GUM (department store), in Russia
- GUM, an oral care brand of Sunstar Group
- The Gums (homestead), a historic homestead in Victoria, Australia
- Gum Air, a Surinamese airline
- Gum languages of New Guinea
- Gum River, in Papua New Guinea
- GUM, the ISO 3166 country code for Guam
- Antonio B. Won Pat International Airport, Guam, FAA/IATA airport code GUM
- Guide to the Expression of Uncertainty in Measurement (GUM), a guide measurement uncertainty
- Genito-urinary medicine

== See also ==
- Gummy (disambiguation)
- Gumball (disambiguation)
- Gumshoe (disambiguation)
- Gum Spring (disambiguation)
- Adhesive
  - Spirit gum
  - List of glues
- Gum-Gum, township in Malaysia
- Gum metal, titanium alloy with high elasticity
- Gum tree, any of various related species of Eucalypt trees
- GumCo, an American advertising agency
