= Gumbo (disambiguation) =

Gumbo is a spicy, hearty stew or soup.

Gumbo may also refer to:

- Gumbo (surname), a list of people with the name
- Gumbo (mascot), a mascot dog of the New Orleans Saints
- Gumbo, Missouri, a community in the United States
- Gumbo (soil), heavy clay soil
- Okra or gumbo, a flowering plant with edible green fruit
- Gumbo Jones, a character in Gumby
- Gumbo, the family name of the characters in Rose Is Rose
- Gumbo, the code name for Adobe Flex 4

== Music ==
- Gumbo'!, an album by Pink Siifu, 2021
- Gumbo (PJ Morton album), 2017
- Gumbo (Young Nudy album), 2023
- Gumbo!, an album by Pony Poindexter with Booker Ervin, 1973
- Dr. John's Gumbo, an album by Dr. John, 1972
- "Gumbo" (song), by Phish, 1995
- "Gumbo", a song by Jay Rock from 90059, 2015

== See also ==
- Captain Gumbo, a Dutch Cajun music and zydeco band
- Vertisol or "black gumbo", a type of soil
- Gumball (disambiguation)
