= Gumby (disambiguation) =

Gumby is a character made of green clay who was the star of the animated television series The Gumby Show.

Gumby may also refer to:

- Gumby: The Movie, featuring the green character
- Gumbys, recurring characters in the television series Monty Python's Flying Circus
- Gumby (album), released in 1989
- Kyle "Gumby" Gunther, the lead singer of American heavy metal band Battlecross
- L. S. Alexander Gumby (1885–1961), African-American archivist and historian
- Jordan Montgomery, American baseball pitcher, nicknamed "Gumby".

== See also ==
- Survival suit, "quick don" versions being known as Gumby suits
- The Old Gumbie Cat Jennyanydots, a character from Old Possum's Book of Practical Cats and the musical Cats
- Gumbly, Characters believed to have appeared on The Simpsons
- Gummy (disambiguation)
