= Plastic cement =

Plastic Cement may refer to:

- Cement, in the US where it refers to certain formulations of Masonry Cement
- Dichloromethane, used to solvent weld some thermoplastics including acrylic
- Butanone, model cement is a thick mixture with polystyrene
- Tetrahydrofuran, the main solvent in PVC cement

== See also ==
- List of glues
- Plastic welding
