= Charles van Rysselberghe =

Belgian architect

- Portrait of Charles van Rysselberghe
- Born: Carolus Julianus van Rysselberghe; 25 July 1850; Meerle, Belgium
- Died: 30 April 1920 (aged 69); Nice, France
- Occupation: Architect
- Buildings: Museum of Fine Arts in Ghent; Zebrastraat in Ghent

Charles van Rysselberghe (25 July 1850 – 30 April 1920) was a Belgian architect.

== Biography ==
Carolus Julianus van Rysselberghe was born in Meerle, Hoogstraten, on 25 July 1850. He was trained at the Academy of Ghent, studying there between 1863 and 1875. After his education at the academy, he was honored with the Prize of the City of Ghent.

He was municipal architect of the city of Ostend for two years. Among his works in this city is the Vishal. Then, in 1879, he became city architect of the city of Ghent, succeeding Adolphe Pauli, with whom he had worked at the start of his career. As city architect of Ghent he carried out many works of restoration and renovation. Among other things, he extended the Cloth Hall, extended the Academy of Ghent, and turned two Gothic houses (the Zwarte Moor and the Grote Sikkel) into a conservatory. He built many buildings in Ghent, including twenty schools. Among the latter are the Andries School on Triestlaan (1881–1883) and the Laurentius Institute on Onderstraat (1901), both in Flemish Neo-Renaissance style.

His best known work, however, is the Museum of Fine Arts, built between 1898 and 1904 and extended in 1912.

Van Rysselberghe also taught architecture at the Ghent academy. In 1905, he was one of the founders of the Ghent Workers Housing Company. It was one of the first social housing associations in Belgium, and for it he completed five projects. Van Rysselberghe had limited resources for this work, but still managed a polychrome use of materials on a lively design.

== Selected works ==
- 1880–1881: Intermediate section of Ghent City Hall, built along the Poeljemarkt between the Aldermen's House of Gedele and the Armenkamer
- 1887–1888: City school on Kaprijkestraat in Ghent
- 1891: Urban boy school on Drongensesteenweg in Ghent
- 1891: City school on Désiré Van Monckhovenstraat in Ghent
- 1893: City school on Molenaarsstraat in Ghent
- 1898: Urban primary school for girls on Acaciastraat in Ghent
- 1898–1904: Museum of Fine Arts of Ghent
- 1901–02: Fire station on Londenstraat in Ghent
- 1904: City school on Frans van Ryhovelaan/Lavendelstraat in Ghent
- 1911–1912: Social housing on Bellefleurstraat in Ghent
- 1912–1913: Social housing on Biezenstuk/Rooigemlaan in Ghent
- 1914: Urban school for girls on Lammensstraat in Ghent
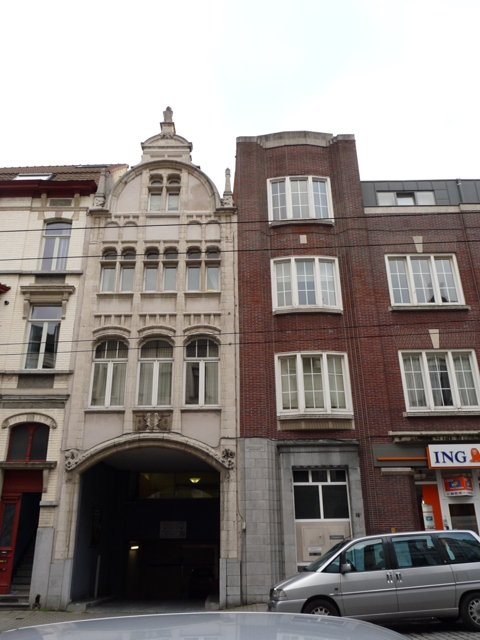
Civil house on Belfortstraat in Ghent

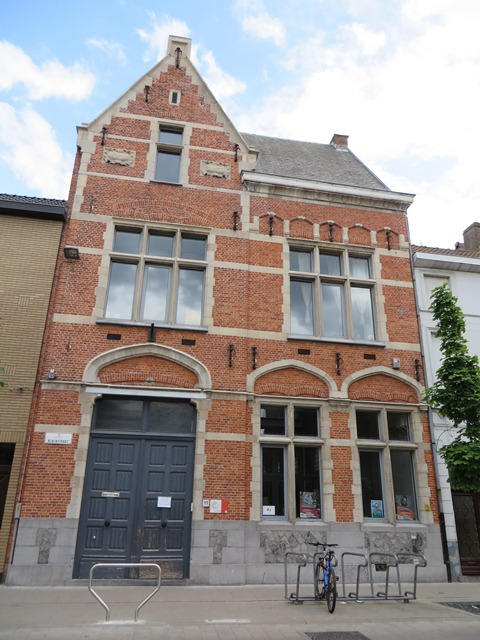
Urban elementary school for boys on Acaciastraat in Ghent

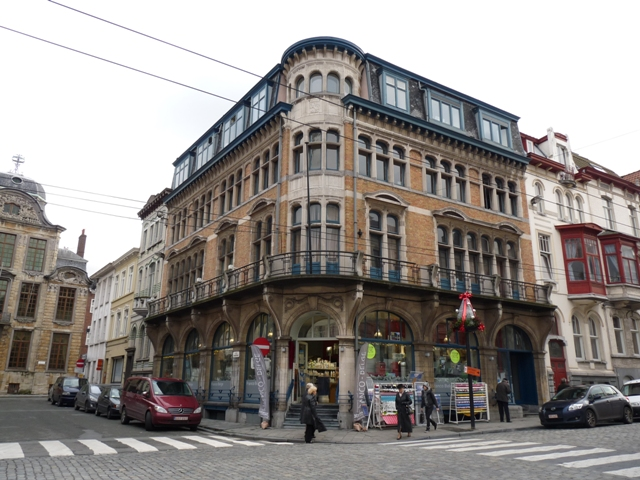
Corner house on Belfortstraat in Ghent

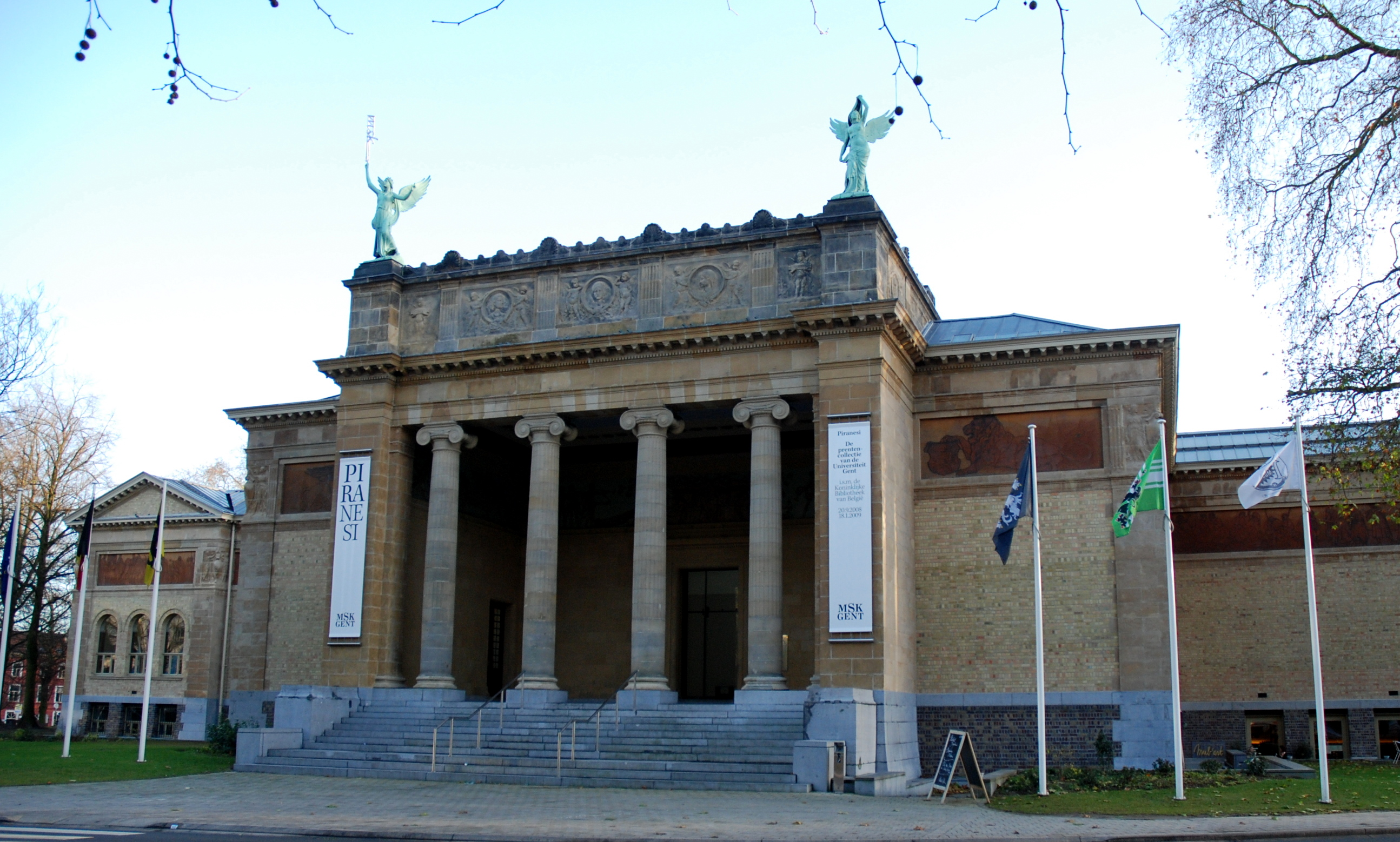
Museum of Fine Arts in Ghent

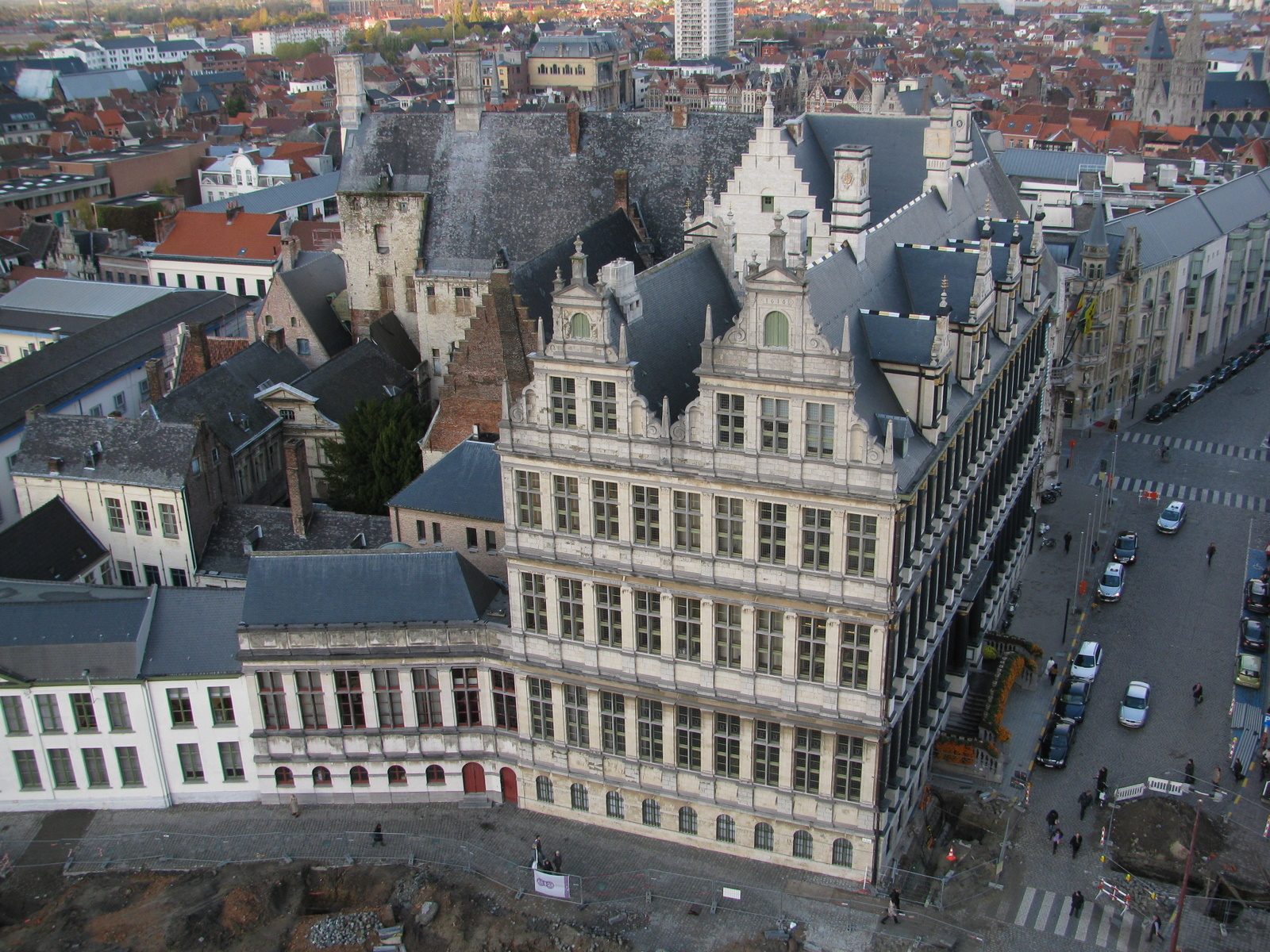
Intermediate section of Ghent City Hall built along the Poeljemarkt

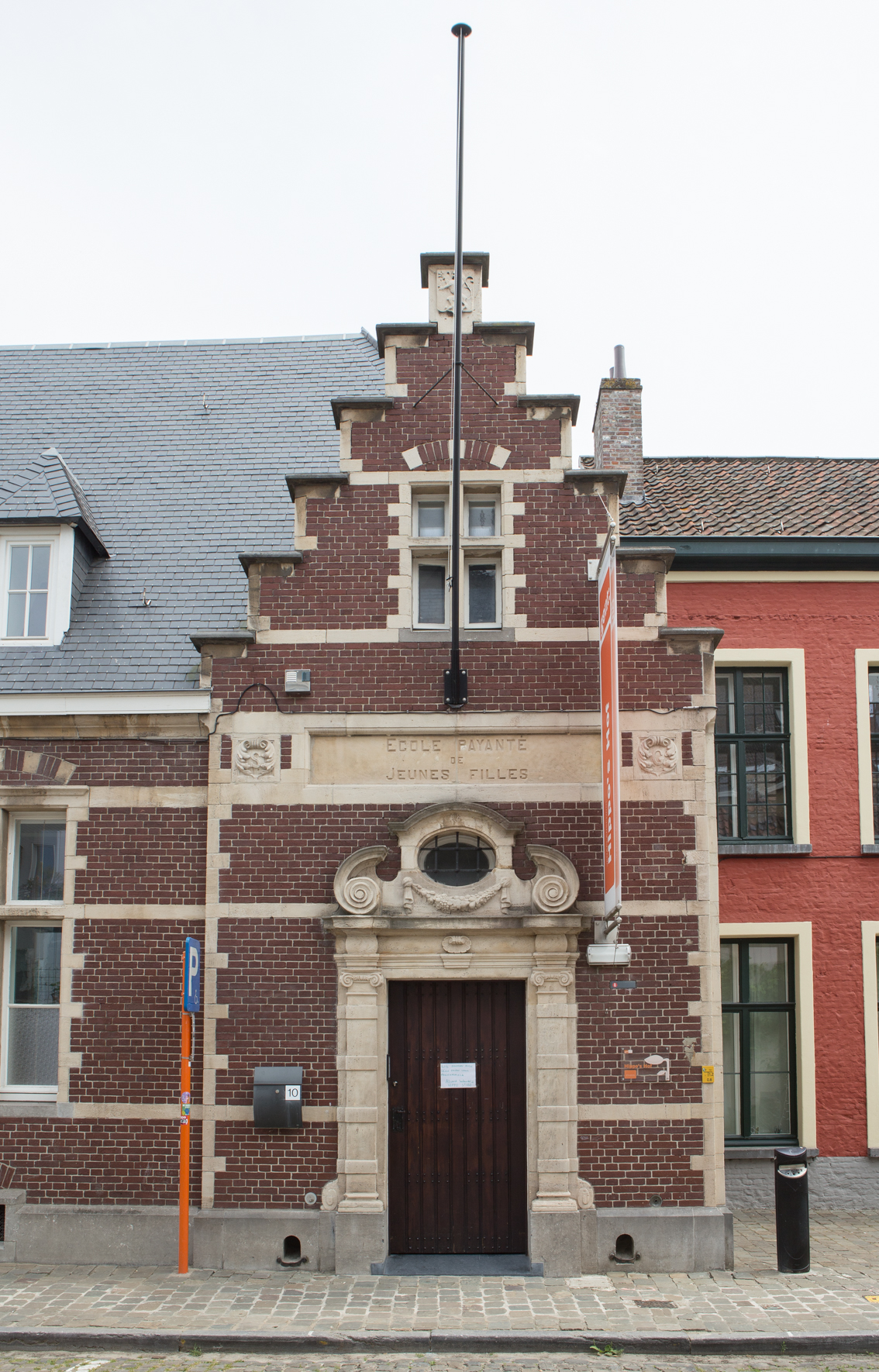
Urban school for girls on Lammensstraat in Ghent

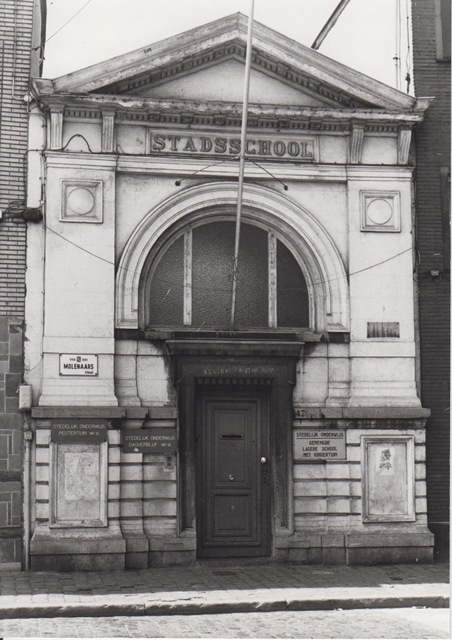
Gatehouse of city school on Molenaarsstraat in Ghent

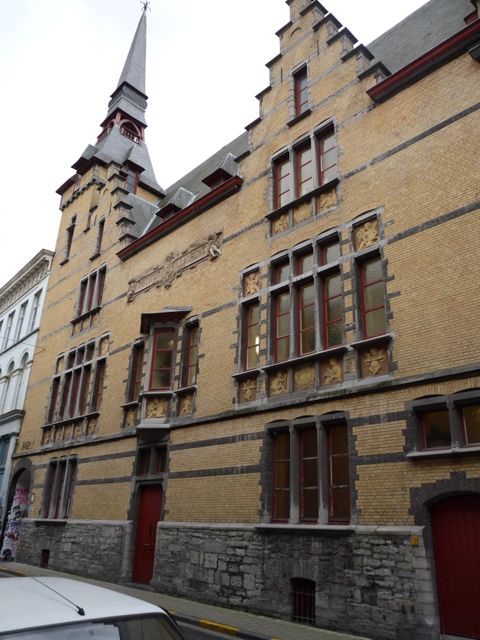
Laurent Institute in Ghent

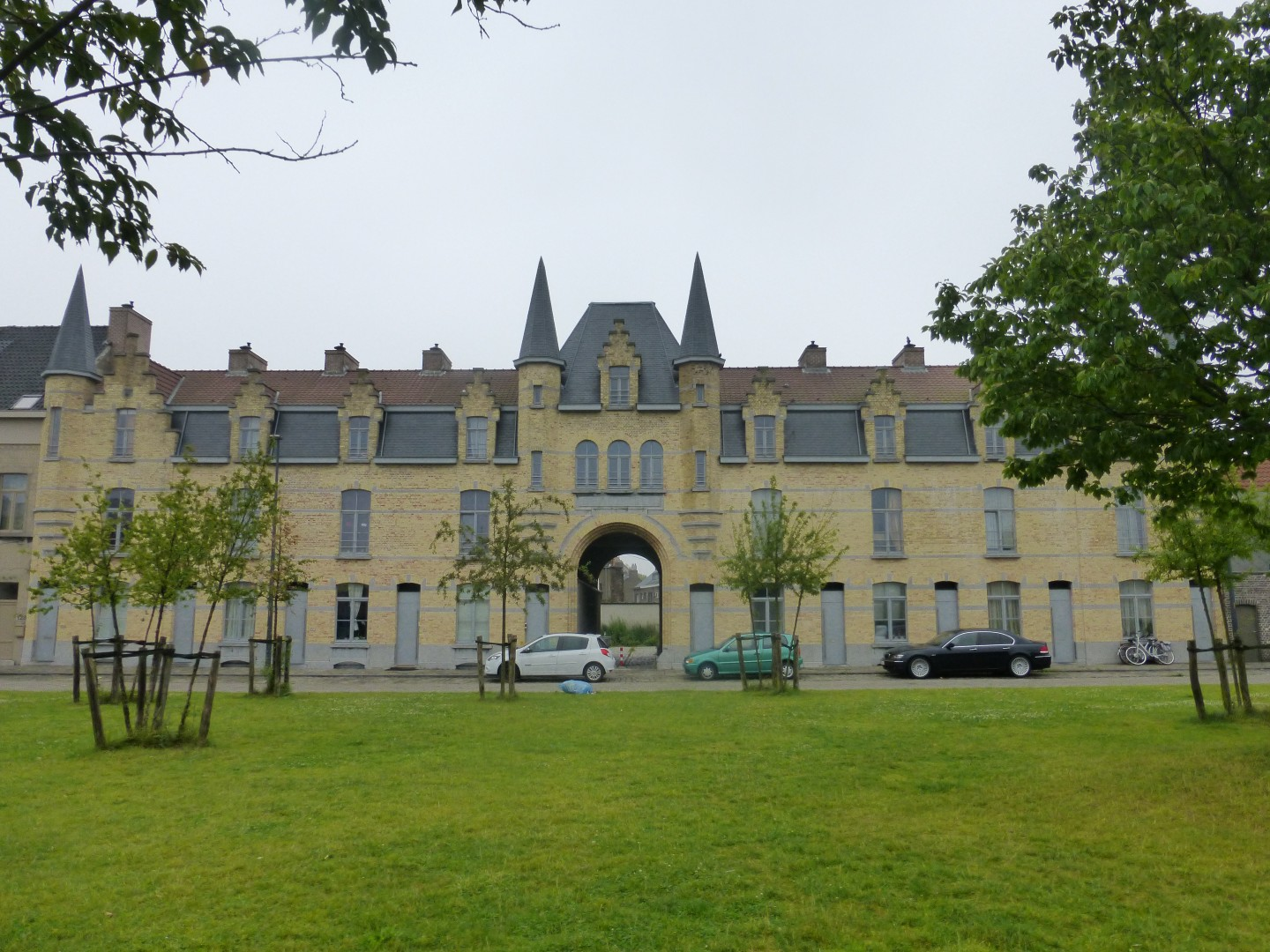
Fire station on Londenstraat in Ghent

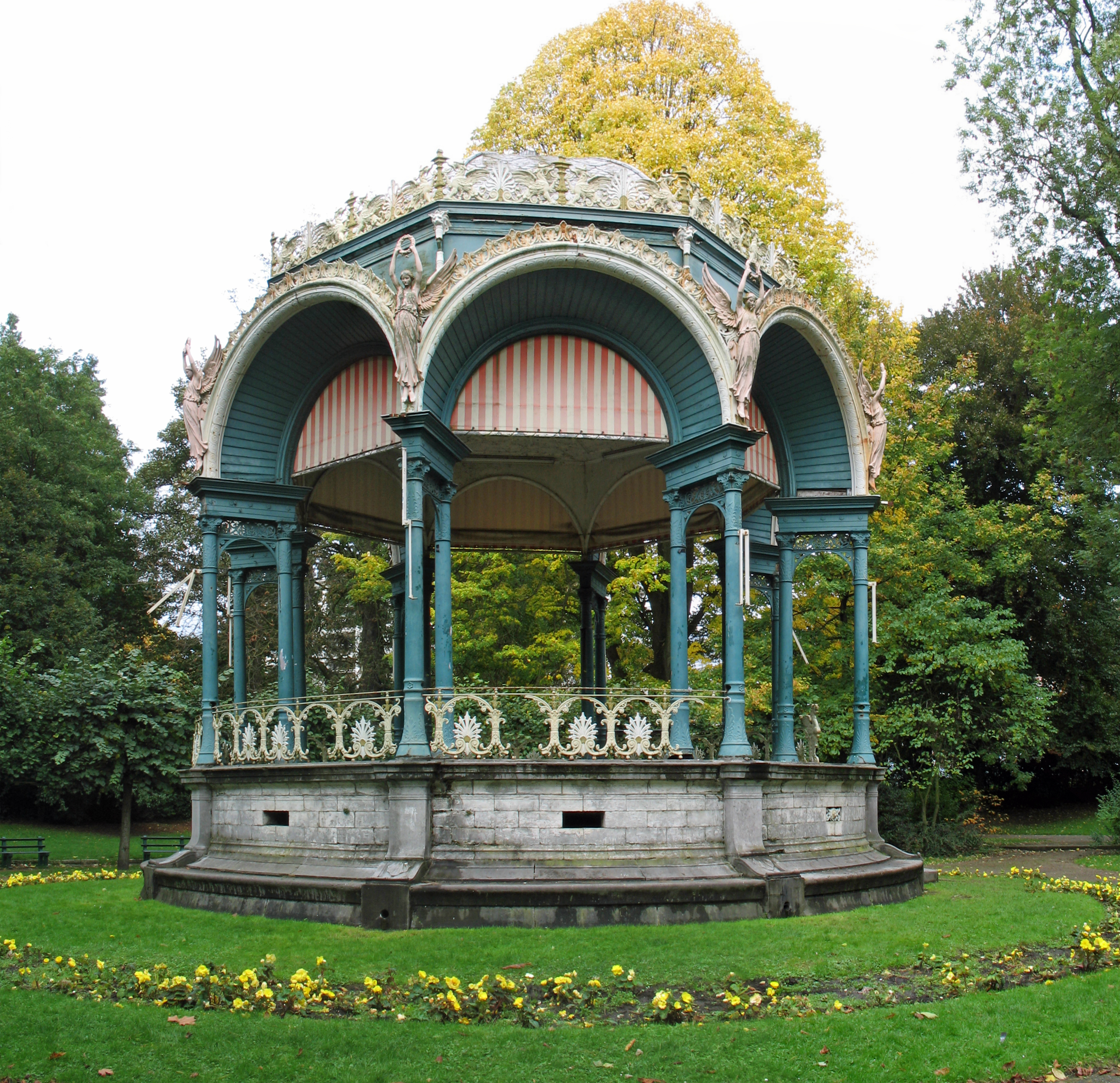
Music kiosk in Citadelpark, Ghent

== See also ==
- Van Rysselberghe family
