= Domien de Waghemakere =

Flemish architect

Domien de Waghemakere, or Dominikus (ca. 1460 – 1542), was a Flemish architect and an important exponent of Brabantine Gothic.

== Biography ==
He began his career in 1494, alongside his father, in the construction of the church of Lier, the Church of Saint Gummarus. Between 1521 and 1530 he completed the tower of the Antwerp Cathedral with a Gothic-flamboyant spire. Between 1502 and 1542 he worked on and completed the St. James' Church in Antwerp; from 1514 to 1529 he is thought to have contributed to the St. Andrew's Church, also in Antwerp. Together with the other great Flemish architect Rombout Keldermans he built the Maison du Roi on the Grand-Place in Brussels between 1514 and 1523; in 1515 he built the Old Stock Exchange of Antwerp; he also probably made the plans for St. Paul's Church in Antwerp; between 1517 and 1533 he contributed to the Ghent City Hall; around 1520, together with Keldermans, he collaborated in the restructuring of the Fortress of Antwerp, Het Steen, and in 1525 at the Castle of the Dukes of Brabant in Turnhout. Between 1525 and 1540 he collaborated again with Keldermans, on Hoogstraten Castle.
