= Ghent City Hall =

Town hall in Ghent, Belgium

- Stadhuis van Gent (Dutch)
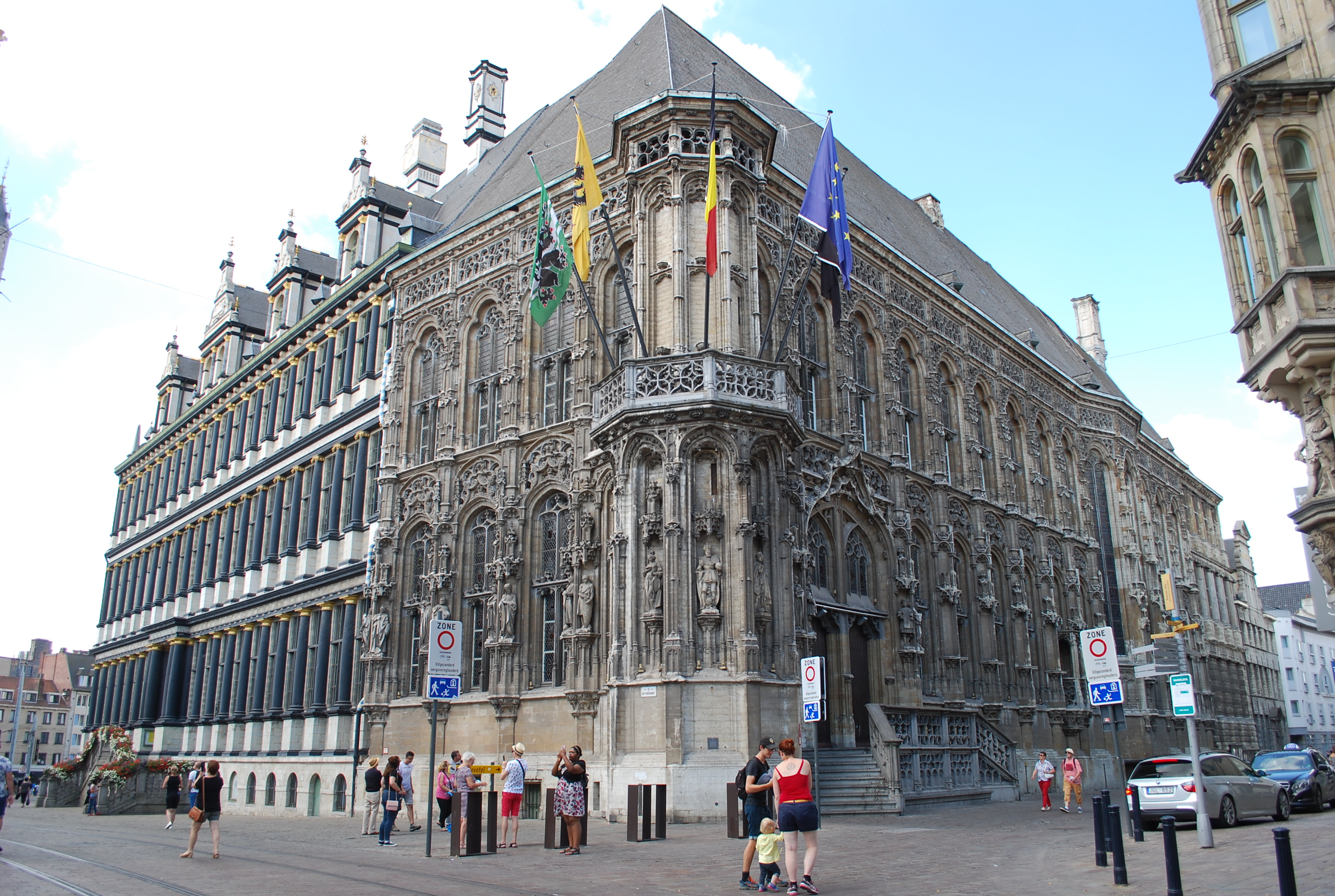
- Ghent's City Hall seen from the Botermarkt

General information
- Type: Town hall
- Architectural style: Late Gothic; Renaissance; Baroque
- Location: Ghent, East Flanders, Belgium
- Coordinates: 51.0545°N 3.7253°E
- Construction started: 1321
- Completed: 1881

Design and construction
- Architects: Domien de Waghemakere, Rombout II Keldermans, Bernard de Wilde, Adolphe Pauli, Charles van Rysselberghe

The City Hall (Dutch: Stadhuis) of Ghent, East Flanders, Belgium, is a four-sided complex surrounded by the Botermarkt, the Hoogpoort, the Stadhuissteeg and the Poeljemarkt. The main wings are the late-Gothic alderman's house of De Keure and the alderman's house of Gedele in the Renaissance style. The building has 51 halls.

== Layout ==
The aldermen's house of De Keure (corner Botermarkt-Hoogpoort) was built in late Gothic flamboyant style between 1519 and 1539 to a design by Rombout II Keldermans and Dominicus de Waeghemaekere. The facade niches were intended to contain the statues of the Counts of Flanders.

The Gedele Alderman's House (corner Botermarkt-Poeljemarkt) is a product of the Renaissance and was built between 1595 and 1618. The facades are characterized by an application of successive Doric, Ionic and Corinthian three-quarter columns and pilasters, inspired by the design of the Italian renaissance palazzi. The side along the Botermarkt has nineteen bays and the side along the Poeljemarkt has nine bays and two gables. The interior of this part of the complex was embellished with chimneys and paintings especially during the 17th century. In the 17th century and early 18th century a number of small offices were built on the west side of the complex, while between 1700 and 1701 a new home for the caratekar of De Keure was erected. Also in the 18th century, the former Armenkamer was erected on the Poeljemarkt. Other works were carried out in the 19th century, including the thorough adaptation of the late Gothic alderman's house De Keure to the taste of the day.

In 1870, Adolphe Pauli carried out works of restoration, also with the collaboration of Eugène Viollet-le-Duc. Between 1880 and 1881, Charles van Rysselberghe built an intermediate section along the Poeljemarkt, between the Aldermen's House of Gedele and the Armenkamer. In the 20th century there were some more works of renovation.

A cellar on the corner of Hoogpoort and Botermarkt (probably a remnant of the Cardeloet house) probably dates from before 1100. The oldest above-ground part in the center of the complex dates from 1482. The Pacification Hall was named after the Pacification of Ghent, proclaimed in 1576.

== Gallery ==
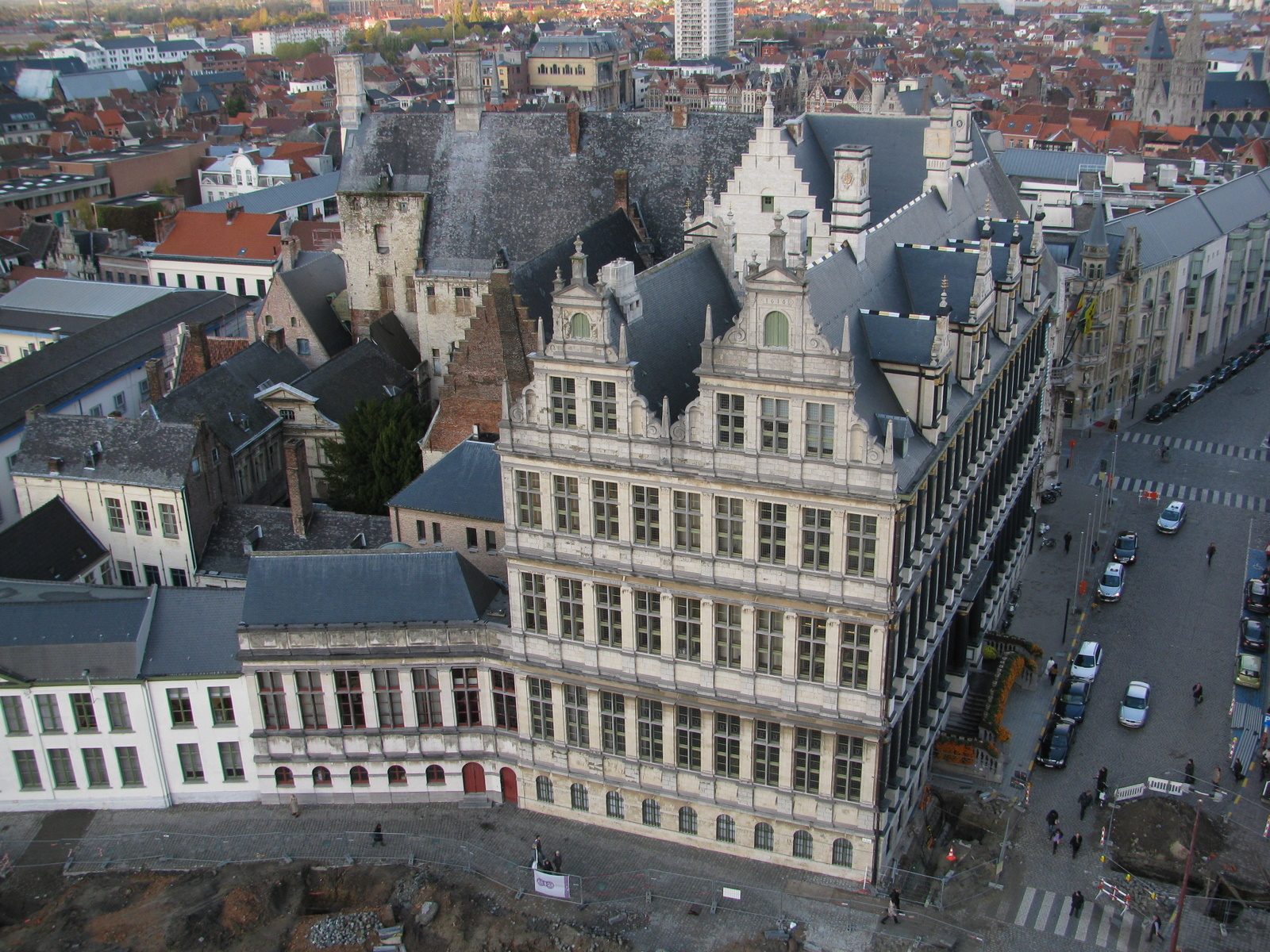

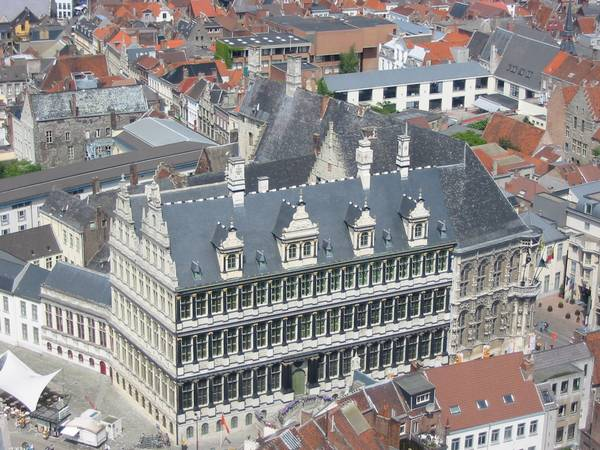

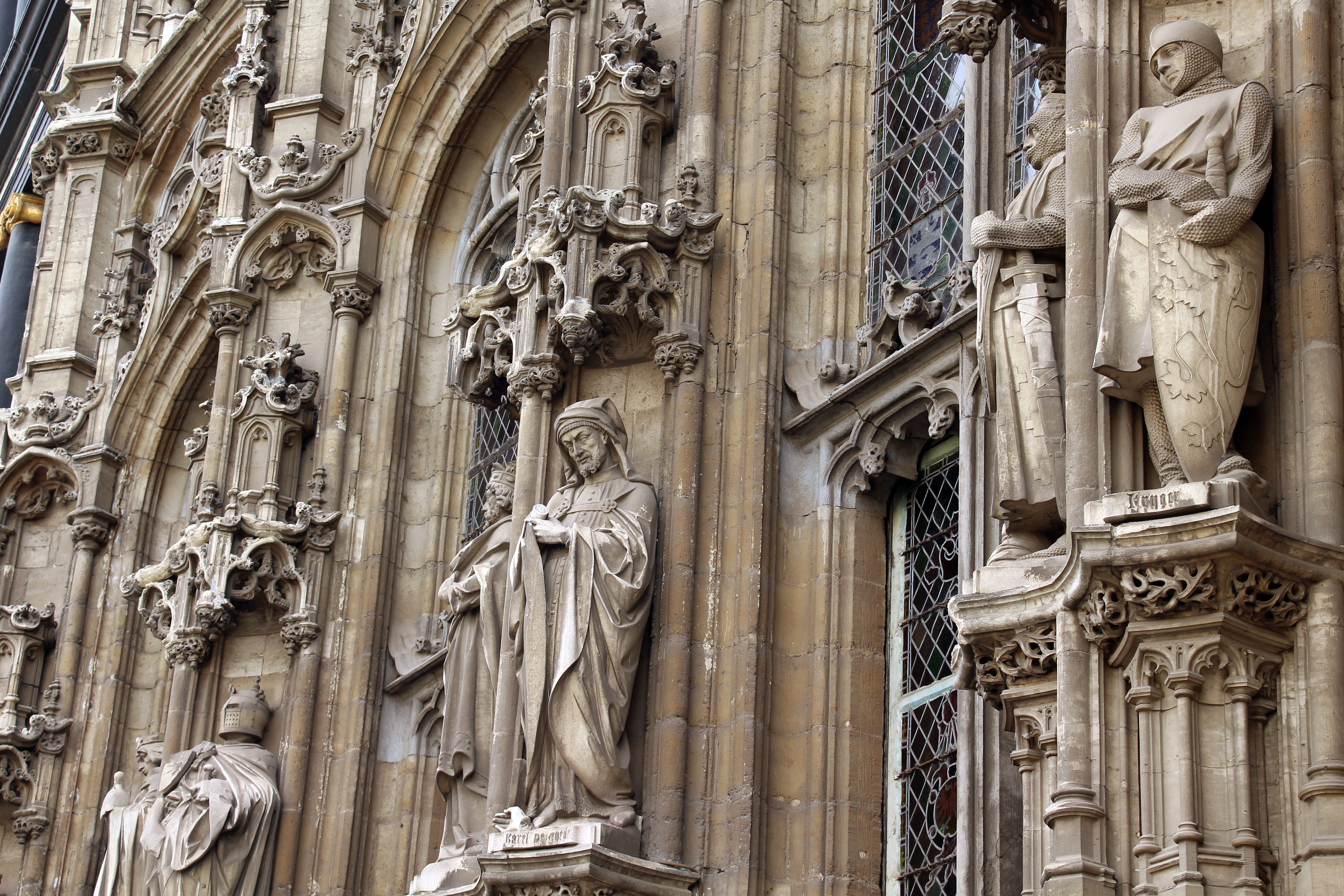

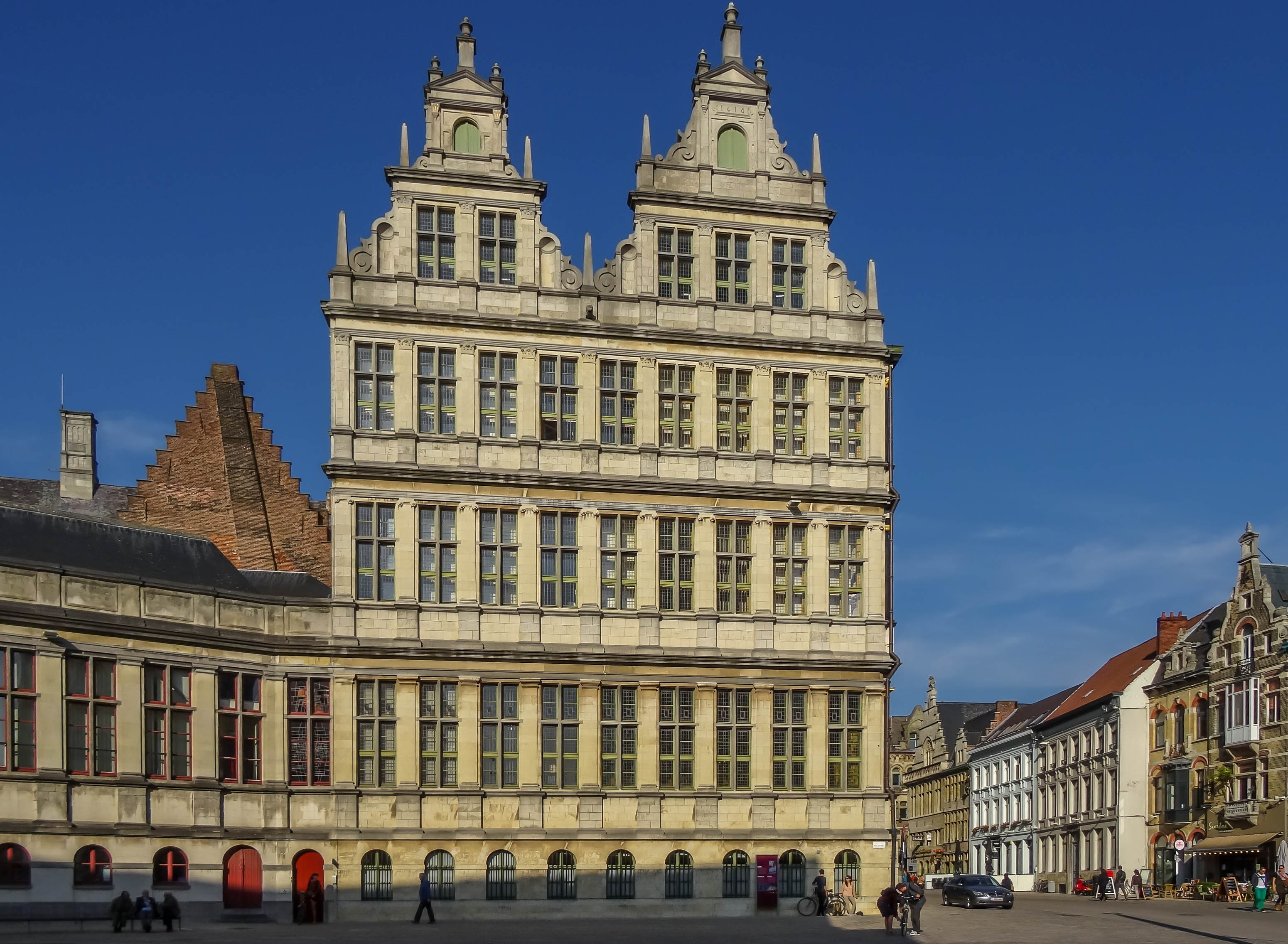

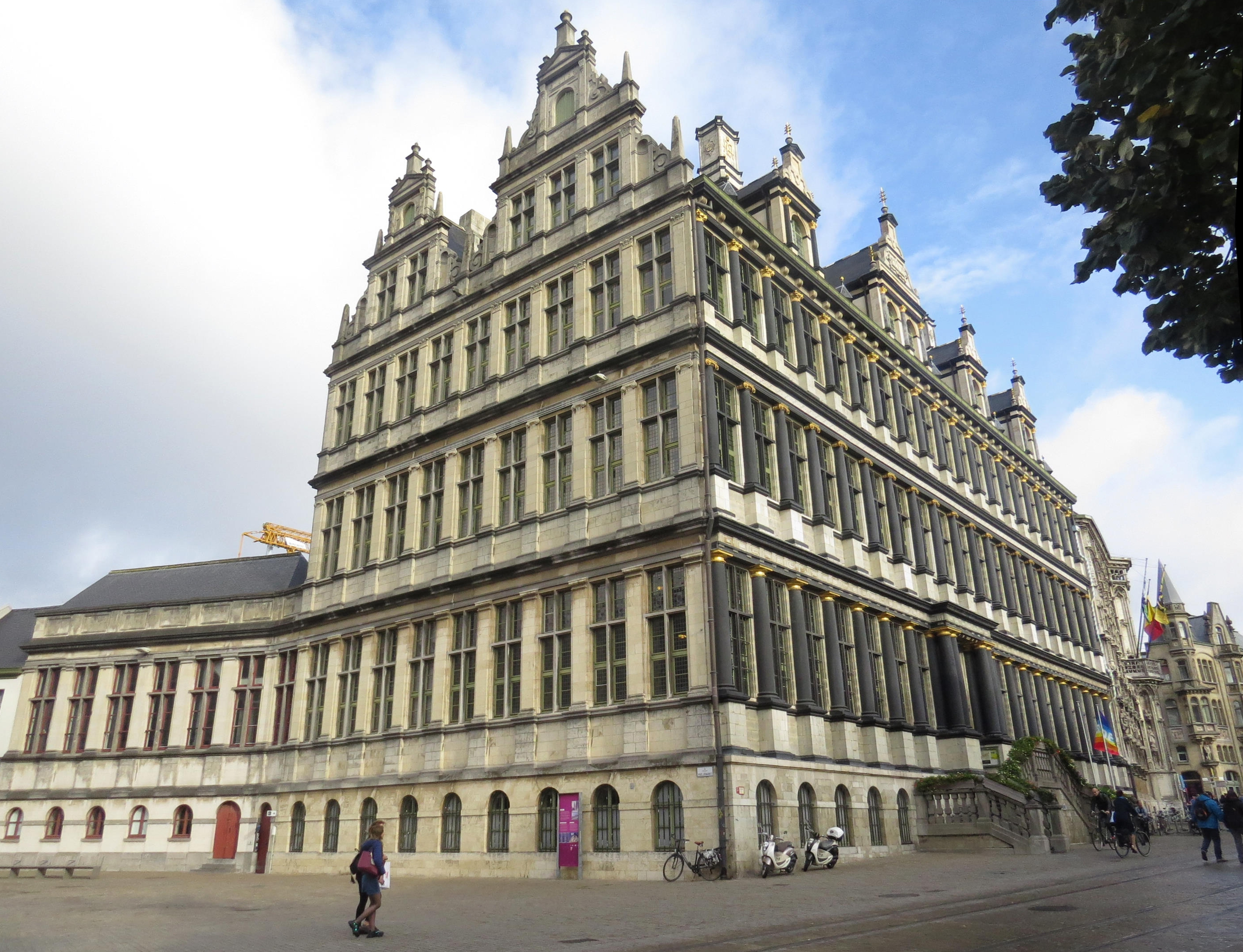

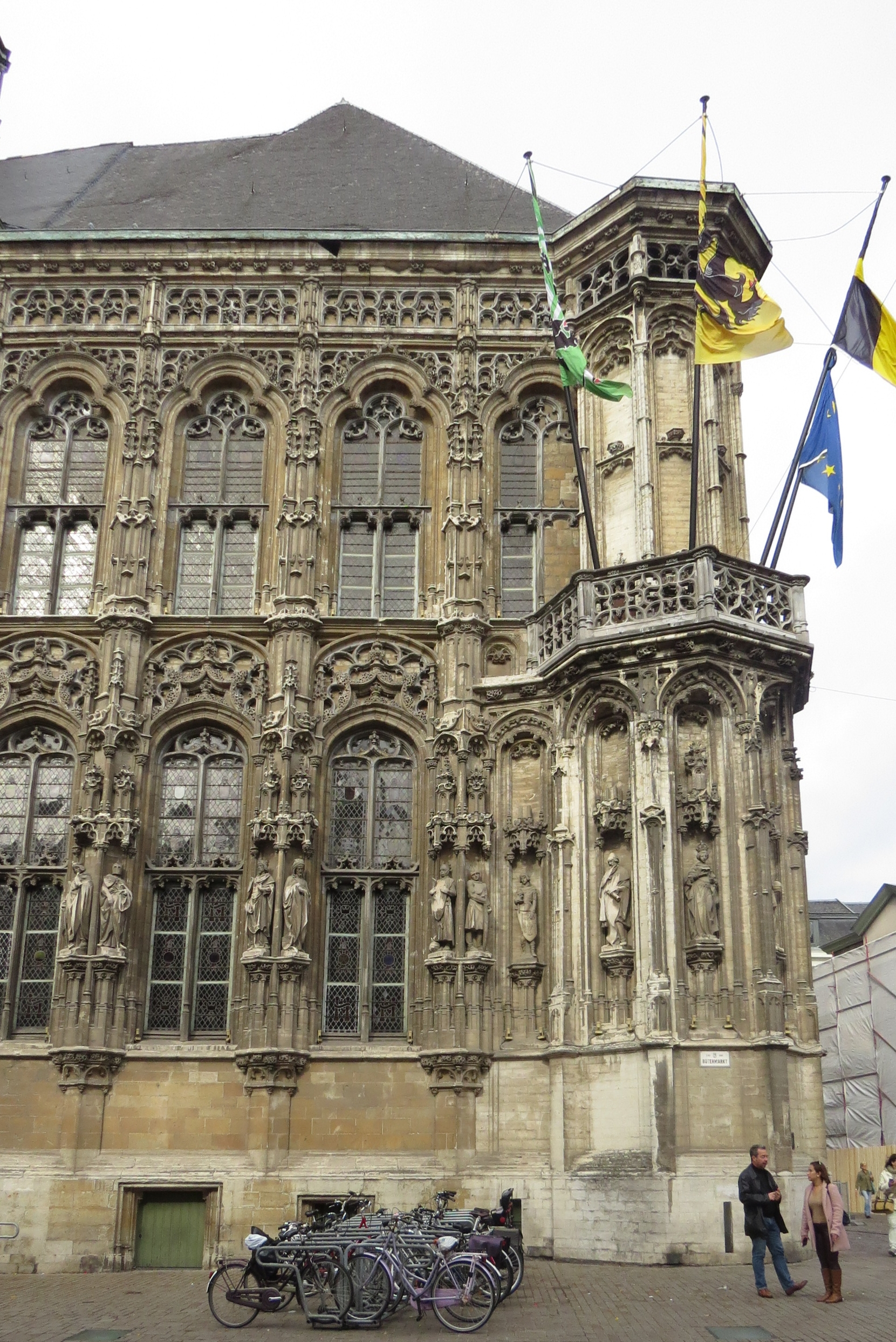
