= Ghent University Museum =

Coordinates: 51.03631°N 3.72419°E

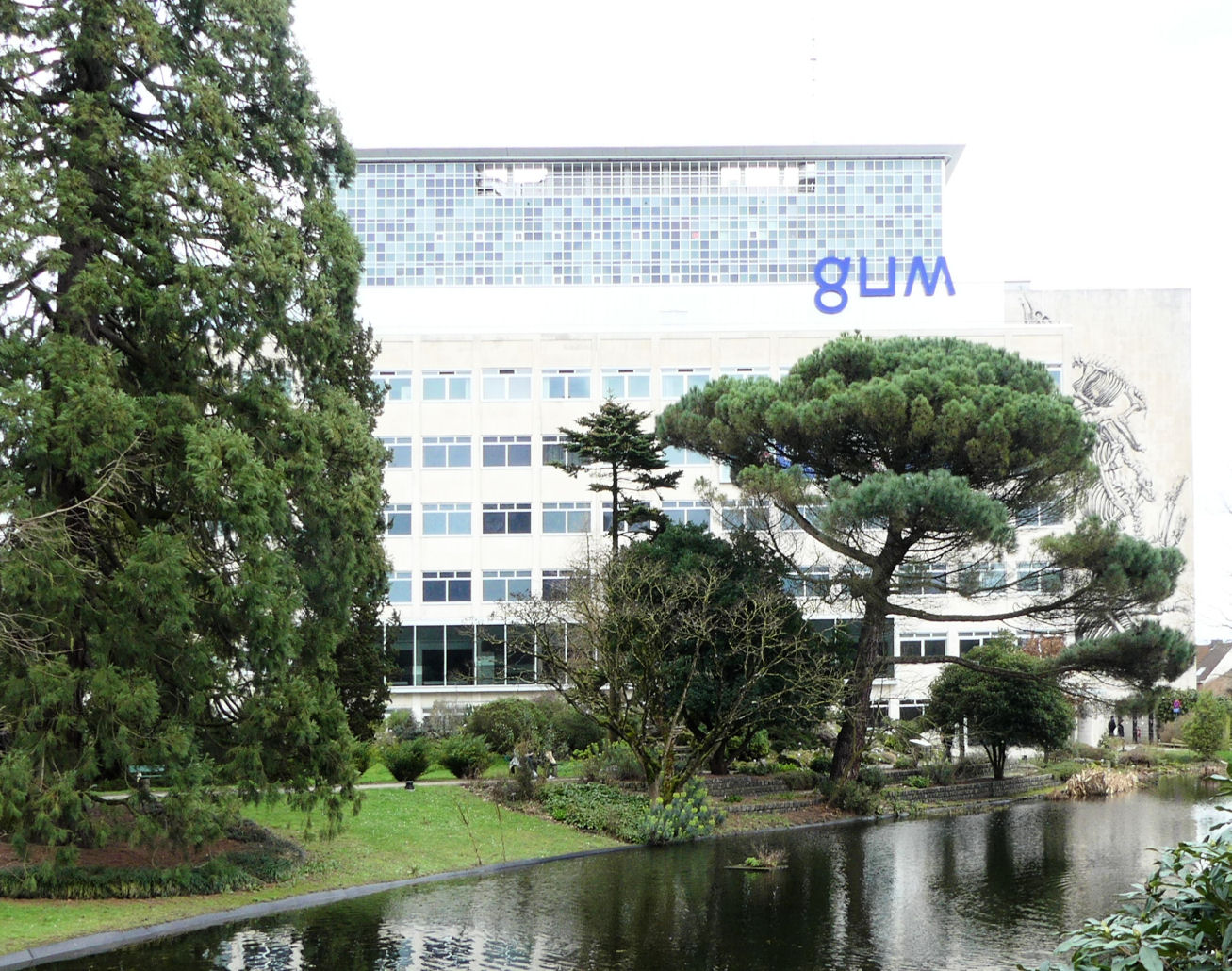
Ghent University Museum and the botanical garden

GUM & Botanical Garden, or the Ghent University Museum and its botanical garden, is a museum that uses academic heritage to illustrate how science works. Since its opening in 2020, the GUM has combined diverse scientific disciplines and shown how doubt and failure are part of the research process without emphasizing success stories. The GUM describes itself as a “Forum for Science, Doubt and Art” that also provides space for artistic research.

In 2022-2023, PHALLUS. Norm & Form was the first major exhibition, followed by Wunderkammer of TRUTH in 2024-2025 and BORDERS in 2026-2027. The exhibitions explore relevant themes that stimulate the imagination, and every two years GUM hosts DARK WEEKends, an Art & Science Festival. Prof. Marjan Doom is the artistic and general director of GUM & Botanical Garden. She previously wrote the manifesto Museum of Doubt for Academia Press, which served as the basis for the current vision of the GUM.

The scientific heritage collections of Ghent University comprise more than 400,000 objects from a wide range of disciplines. The Ghent University Museum (GUM) is responsible for the management and sustainable preservation of these collections. The Botanical Garden houses a wide variety of plant collections spread across the outdoor garden and various greenhouses. In the autumn of 2020, the GUM and the Botanical Garden joined forces to operate as a single entity.

GUM & Botanical Garden is located on the Ledeganck campus of Ghent University, within walking distance of the Citadel Park and the MSK and SMAK art museums. The façade of the building features a giant mural of several animal skeletons by artist ROA.

In 2022, GUM & Botanical Garden, together with graphic designer PJOTR, received the bronze medal of the Henry van de Velde Award for Graphics and the museum gained a special commendation at the European Museum of the Year Award. GUM & Botanical Garden also received the Ultima Culture Prize for Movable and Intangible Cultural Heritage 2023. The juries of the latter two awards praised the museum for encouraging its visitors to ask questions and think critically. MuST (the Museum Student Team) was also mentioned positively for its significant influence on the museum's operations, which attracts many young visitors.

== History GUM ==
The GUM opened its doors in October 2020, but it has a history stretching back more than two hundred years. When the university was founded in 1817, King William I of the Netherlands donated various collections, including medical and archaeological collections, for educational purposes. In the decades that followed, these collections were expanded and sub-collections were created throughout the university. The sub-collections included those of Veterinary Medicine, Archaeology, Ethnography, Morphology, History of Science and History of Medicine. Some of these collections were exhibited in small-scale museums on the corresponding campus, such as the Museum of Zoology, Museum of Morphology, Museum of the History of Science and the Ethnographic Collections.

From 2010 onwards, vision statements were developed to centralise the academic heritage of Ghent University. In 2013, the museum was allocated the Campus Ledeganck location and was given the working title of Ghent University Museum. That same year, a large-scale inventory was carried out, which revealed that the university collections together comprise more than 400,000 objects. This is the largest academic collection in Flanders. GUM is responsible for managing these collections, ensuring that they are preserved in a sustainable manner and exhibited to the public.

In the years leading up to the opening, several exhibitions were organised under the direction of Marjan Doom, exploring ways in which art and science can engage with each other. Post Mortem (2015) dealt with the dead body in science and art, and during Out of the Box (2017-2018), GUM presented various installations at different locations in Ghent in honour of the 200th anniversary of Ghent University. For example, a fin whale skeleton was hung in Saint Bavo's Cathedral.

The opening of the GUM was planned for March 2020 but was postponed until 3 October of that year due to the coronavirus crisis. There is a permanent exhibition with approximately 800 objects organised into seven themes that illustrate the research process across scientific disciplines. These themes are Chaos, Doubt, Model, Measure, Imagination, Knowledge and Network.

== Temporary exhibitions GUM ==
In addition to the permanent exhibition, the GUM organises a temporary exhibition every two years. In the year without a new exhibition DARK WEEKends, an Art & Science Festival, takes place in the autumn, often featuring a smaller exhibition. Temporary exhibitions are always accompanied by a supporting programme consisting of workshops, lectures, debates, guided tours and lecture performances. GUM & Botanical Garden integrates both new and existing works of art into the temporary and permanent exhibitions and in the Botanical Garden, such as on the pond of the Victoria Greenhouse.

PHALLUS. Norm & Form was the first temporary exhibition to open its doors in March 2022, with a planned closing date of early January 2023. Due to its success, it was extended until the end of April. The exhibition dealt with the scientific focus on male genitalia and the role assigned to female genitalia. It made visitors think about the imbalance, its causes and what this means. PHALLUS included research by Piet Hoebeke, Guy T'Sjoen and Jasmine Abdulcadir, among others. In addition, there was also art on display by Belgian artists such as Sofie Muller, Murielle Scherre and Berlinde de Bruckere and international artists such as Man Ray and David Hockney. The end of PHALLUS. Norm & Form was accompanied by an event weekend called Vulva Weekend in April 2023, and in May the exhibition moved to the University Museum of Groningen.

In March 2024, Wunderkammer of THRUTH opened its doors for thirteen months. This exhibition dealt with, the search for truth, how truth changes over time and how science determines it, amongst other things. When and why do we trust something or someone, and does absolute truth exist? Wunderkammer of TRUTH exhibited art by Kehinde Wiley, Nick Ervinck, Will Cotton and Babette Van Rafelghem. In the additional programme Luanda Casella, in collaboration with NTGent, brought the theatre performance Short of Lying to GUM, and the art collective playField reworked their performance I Remember and presented it several times at the Ghent Wintercircus. Towards the end of the exhibition, a Lie Weekend took place with an extensive programme that focused on lies rather than truth, including a Werewolves of Millers Hollow championship. This exhibition was largely revived by the Rijksmuseum Boerhaave in 2026 under the title Truth? The Art of Doubt.

In October 2025, the second edition of DARK WEEKends | Art & Science Festival took place, highlighting topics that are difficult to discuss. The festival and its diverse programme lasted two weekends and dealt with the themes of shame, taboo and mourning that year. At the same time, a shorter and smaller exhibition (UN)SHAME opened as part of DARK WEEKends, showcasing art by four artists exploring shame and letting go of it. The artworks by Hanne Lamon, Ugo Woatzi, Loïs Soleil and Giulia Cauti were on display for three months.

BORDERS opened in March 2026 as the third major temporary exhibition organised by GUM & Plantentuin. The exhibition explores the concept of borders as structures that organise and impart meaning within social, cultural and scientific contexts. Through the work of scientists and artists, it examines how borders are defined, questioned and sometimes crossed. The exhibition features art by, among others, Roger Raveel, Berlinde De Bruyckere, Francis Alÿs, Bieke Depoorter, Panamarenko, Lieve Blancquaert, Robbert&Frank Frank&Robbert, Lana Schneider and playField. With NOIR PERFORMANCE, Luanda Casella has created a marketing campaign for BORDERS that can be seen in the museum and throughout the city of Ghent. In doing so, the Brazilian word artist, who lives in Ghent, hijacks the language of power. She explores how communication influences society’s perception of the world.

== History of the Botanical Garden ==
The history of the Botanical Garden goes back even further than that of Ghent University, but it has not always been in the same place. After Napoleon conquered the Southern Netherlands in 1794, Ghent became the capital of the Scheldt and Leie department, which meant that it was given a botanical garden, among other things. This was in the Boudelo Abbey and opened its doors in 1797. The collection was built up by other gardens and amateur growers. The garden was divided into four parts and was visited by Napoleon in 1803. The following year, the Botanical Garden was transferred to the city of Ghent.

Throughout the nineteenth century, the number of factories in the vicinity of the garden increased, and their soot began to cover the plants. For this reason, in 1903, the Botanical Garden was moved to the vicinity of the new Citadel Park, where it is still located today. In the first half of the twentieth century, several new greenhouses were added to the botanical garden.

== Living and non-living collection Botanical Garden ==
The Botanical Garden's collection contains approximately 10,000 plant species from around the world that are important for scientific research conducted by Ghent University and both national and international partners. This includes studying the evolution and relationships of plants and describing new species. The collection also includes several endangered species, which are well preserved there.

The Botanical Garden consists of several sections and multiple greenhouses. The Victoria greenhouse, succulent greenhouse, tropical and subtropical greenhouse are open to the public, while the collection greenhouses are inaccessible to protect its plants. The Victoria greenhouse contains a pond with various plants, such as water lilies that reached a record width of 260 centimetres in the summer of 2024 thanks to a new mixture of nutrients. The tropical greenhouse contains several titan arums, which rarely flower, but thanks to the favourable conditions in the greenhouse, they bloom almost every year. This produces a strong scent and can be viewed on a live stream. The outdoor collection includes a swamp with carnivorous plants, a rock garden, a Mediterranean zone and a zone with edible and medicinal plants.

In addition, the Ghent Botanical Garden also has a very extensive herbarium with 300,000 specimens. Approximately half of these are vascular plants, supplemented by 100,000 fungi, 20,000 mosses and many other species. These collections are important for ongoing scientific research and have led to many theses, doctoral studies and publications since the 1970s. The herbarium is being digitised as part of the DigiHerb research project, which also includes herbaria from Dublin and Karlsruhe.

== Awards ==
On 7 May 2022, the European Museum of the Year Award ceremony took place in Estonia, and the GUM was awarded a special commendation. The museum received this thanks to its dedication to science, art and critical thinking. The jury emphasised that the museum encourages its visitors to reflect on the plurality of meanings in a fascinating way.

In 2022, GUM & Botanical Garden, together with graphic design agency PJOTR, won third place in the Henry van de Velde Award for Graphics for their corporate identity. The jury described it as accessible, inviting and full of scientific references.

Later, GUM & Botanical Garden won the Ultima Culture Prize for Movable and Intangible Cultural Heritage 2023, with the jury stating that GUM & Botanical Garden is innovative, inclusive and inspiring. Here too, the encouragement of critical thinking was rewarded, in addition to the focus on doubt and the importance of youth participation through their Museum Student Team (MuST). The jury described the degree of MuST's involvement as impressive, as was the way in which students from a wide range of disciplines work together with the museum team to organise events such as the annual Museum Night. As a result, GUM & Botanical Garden has a very wide reach among students.
