= Zebrastraat =

Coordinates: 51.04°N 3.7337°E

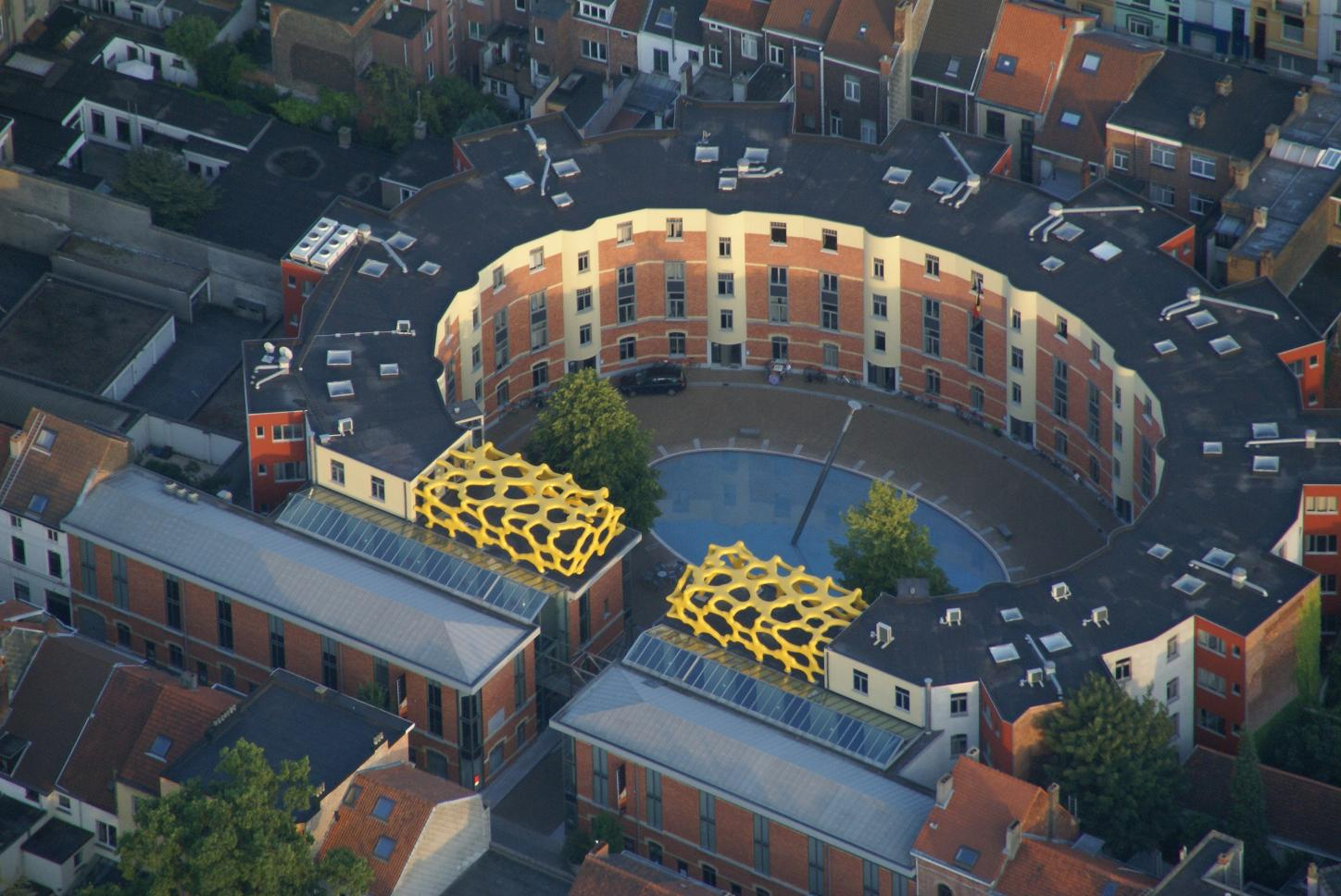
Aerial view of Zebrastraat with roof sculpture by Nick Ervinck

The Zebrastraat (Dutch for "Zebra Street") is a small street in the Belgian city of Ghent. The first worker housing building in the country, designed by the architect Charles van Rysselberghe in 1906, is located in the Zebrastraat. The building, also named the Zebrastraat after its location, remains a private project dedicated to housing, entrepreneurial, and cultural initiatives.

== History ==
The Zebrastraat is located on land formerly occupied by the Ghent Zoo, which opened in 1851. When the zoo closed in 1905, the land was purchased by the city of Ghent, which used the land to create a new neighborhood. In recognition of the previous use of the land, several streets in the area were named after animals that were once housed at the zoo, including Elephant Street (Olifantstraat), Tiger Street (Tijgerstraat), Lion Street (Leeuwstraat) and Zebra Street (Zebrastraat).

At the beginning of the 20th century, the textile industry in Ghent was booming, but many workers nevertheless suffered from poor housing conditions. The city council, along with some notable charity organizations, established the Ghent Workers Housing Company (Gentsche Maatschappij Der Werkerswoningen) which built and later rented higher-quality houses for the working class. Their plan to improve housing on the Zebrastraat centered on a building project designed and supervised by Charles Van Rysselberghe, the officially appointed "City Architect" of Ghent. Since accommodation in the city was very expensive, Van Rysselberghe decided to construct an apartment-styled building with three units on top of each other. This housing project is widely known as the first social housing apartment building in Belgium.

The building never had an official name, but it was popularly called "The Circle" (De Cirk) because of its circular central square. A 4th story was added in the 1930s. By the 1990s, the Ghent Workers Housing Company had evolved into the Ghent Housing Association (Gentse Huisvestingsmaatschappij), but they had trouble maintaining the decaying building. In 2001, the barely inhabited ruins were put up for sale and sold to the Liedts-Meesen Foundation. Between 2002 and 2005, this new owner reconstructed the exterior of the buildings into its original state and design, while profoundly reshaping the interior. It was the beginning of "The Zebrastraat project". The goal of the new Zebrastraat project is to create an urban climate by combining and mixing art, business, and housing. People can rent short or long term apartments, companies can book meetings or events, and artists can display their performances.

In 2012, the Zebrastraat project expanded with the building of "New Zebra", a brand new extension to the original building, housing several life-size public artworks of artists such as Ned Kahn and Nick Ervinck.

== Initiatives ==
The projects of the Zebrastraat project concentrated on interactive and experiential digital art. The foundation has favored less well known forms of artistic expression, especially those that reflect technological changes. The first initiative was the exhibition Stippels en Pixels in early 2005, linking new digital art forms with the pointillism of Theo Van Rysselberghe, brother of the original Zebrastraat architect. The success of this exhibition led to follow-up in 2006 with Update, a bi-annual exhibition for interactive and digital art, and to the creation of the New Technological Art Award in 2008. The award is presented to the individual who displays Outstanding Work in the World of Digital Art, after the evaluation by an international jury. The project has also begun naming an "Artist of the Month," which allows a promising young artist to present his or her work to a broad and diverse public audience in a non-commercial context.

In 2010, a second Update exhibition was organized, in the form of Body Sound, in cooperation with the Centre Georges Pompidou in Paris. The Update events always conclude with an exhibition by an established provincial artist. The Zebrastraat project also owns its own permanent art collection, with works by Nick Ervinck, Panamarenko, Thomas Huyghe and Honoré d’O, among others.

In addition to artistic endeavors, the foundation is also engaged in projects promoting diversity and opposing fragmentation between people, such as Habbekrats, a service for disadvantaged young people and for transgressing initiatives.

== New Technological Art Award ==
The New Technological Art Award is an biannual award and exhibition first held in 2005.

Year	Title	Jury Award	Public Award	Award in collaboration with the STARTS-program of the European Commission	Other Artists
2005	Dots and Pixels				
2006	Update_1				Peter Beyls, Jean-Louis Boissier, Anouk De Clercq, Edmond Couchot & Michel Bret, Chris Cunningham, François Curlet, Jean-Marie Dallet, Koen De Decker, Driessens & Verstappen, Masaki Fujihata, Jerry Galle, Tobias Grewenig, Thierry Guibert, Peter Kogler, Piotr Kowalski, Christian Laroche, William Latham, Sol LeWitt, Lia, Matt Mullican, David Renaud, Soda Play, Koen Theys, Erki de Vries
2008	Update_2	Julien Maire (FR) - "Exploding Camera"	Nick Ervinck (BE) - "Studies 2004-2006"	Julien Maire (FR) - "Exploding Camera"	Jim Campbell, Heinz Mack, Piero Fogliati, Bruno Munari, Kovac Architecture, Masaki Fujihata, Golan Levin, Wolfgang Münch, Jeffrey Shaw, Tony Oursler and Bruce Nauman, Esther Polak, Michell and Jean-Pierre Hartmann
2010	Update_3	Julien Gachadoat (FR) - "Gravity"	Julien Gachadoat (FR) - "Gravity" & Go Eun Im (KR) - "SEE(N)"		Bruce Nauman, Vito Acconci, Manon de Boer, Céleste Boursier-Mougenot, Carsten Nicolai - Alva Noto, Anouk De Clercq, Didier Faustino, Mike Kelly / Scanner, Martin Creed, Adam McEwen, Keiko Owada, Mika Vainio, Chris Marker, Ugo Rondinone, Emmanuel Lagarrigue and Semiconductor
2012	Update_4	Julijonas Urbonas (LT) - "Euthanasia Coaster"	Wim Janssen (BE) - "Static"		
2014	Update_5	Quayola (IT) - "Captives" & Jacob Tonski (US) - "Balance From Within"	Patrick Tresset - "5 Robots Named Paul"		
2016	Update_6	Michael Kugler (US) and Sebastian Wolf (DE) - "Brume"	1024 Architecture - "WALKING Cube"	Theresa Schubert - "Growing Geometries (Tattooing Mushrooms)"	
2019	Update_7				

== Exhibitions at Zebrastraat ==
- 2005: Stippels en Pixels
- 2006: Update I (curator Jean-Marie Dallet)
- 2006: 40 year of paintings by Henri Vandermoere
- 2006: Wonderland - Fluxus and the game
- 2007: Cabinet portraits 1962-2006 Pjeroo Roobjee
- 2008: Update II (curator Peter Weibel, ZKM)
- 2009: Picture Palace Hans Vandekerckove
- 2010: Update III (curator Christine Van Assche, Centre Pompidou)
- 2010: Verlangzamingen Michel Buylen
- 2013: Expo Etienne De Smet
- 2016: Update VI
- 2017: Dream Box Deluge Ben Bubb
