= Gumshoe =

Gumshoe is a term for a rubber-soled shoe, one form of which is the galosh.

Gumshoe may also refer to:

- Gumshoe, a slang term for a detective, from wearing soft, quiet rubber-soled shoes
- Gumshoe (album), 2025 album by Samantha Crain
- Gumshoe (film), Stephen Frears's 1971 directorial debut
- Gumshoe (video game), a 1986 Nintendo shooter
- Gumshoe, the Hardboiled Detective in the 30s, a 1981 book-based game published by Sleuth Publications
- Gumshoe: Reflections in a Private Eye, a 1988 non-fiction book by Josiah Thompson
- Gumshoe Awards, an American award for popular crime fiction literary works
- Gumshoe System, a tabletop role-playing game system designed for investigative scenarios
- Dick Gumshoe, a character in the 2001 video game, Ace Attorney

== See also ==
- Gum boot
- Gum (disambiguation)
