= Graggle Simpson =

Hoax fictional character

An edited image of the Simpson family with Graggle imposed to the far right.

Graggle Simpson, also referred to as Gumbly, is an Internet meme centered on a metafictional character of the same name, satirically claimed to be a former core member of the Simpson family on the American animated sitcom The Simpsons, having been removed through retroactive continuity. The intent behind the meme includes satirizing the Mandela effect and its believers. Graggle is most commonly portrayed as a yellow, unclothed, alien-like humanoid with a large mouth and three strands of hair, commonly portrayed in hoax materials alongside members of the Simpson family.

Most claims made about Graggle include a backstory regarding the character's existence in the sitcom's lore. Various permutations of the story claim that he was intended to be a self-insert of The Simpsons creator Matt Groening, that he was a much-beloved character among fans, or, alternatively, that he was removed due to poor viewer reception, or that he was added late in the show's run as a way of satirizing the show's perceived decline in quality. A variety of fan works featuring Graggle have been produced, including fan art, edited cover art, screenshots and recordings of episodes of The Simpsons that include Graggle amongst other characters of the cast, and a modification for the 2003 video game The Simpsons: Hit and Run.

== Origin ==
Although the character was expanded upon and hit viral levels of popularity in 2022, the earliest mentions of Graggle, also referred to as "Gumbly", date to 2015, when an anonymous user on the Japanese textboard 2channel added a version of the character referred to as "Nan-j min" to screenshots of The Simpsons, with Nan-j min being a mascot of the site's /livejupiter/ board (nicknamed "Nan-j") at the time. The earliest references to the character in English date from early 2021 on 4chan, in a post that establishes the prior aspect of Graggle being intended as Groening's persona, and also introducing two alternate names, "Yellow Matt" and "Weird Matt". The name "Gumbly" was likely inspired by Gumby, a claymation character who once made a cameo appearance in the seventeenth season episode "The Girl Who Slept Too Little".

== See also ==
- "The Lost Art of Forehead Sweat", an episode of The X-Files that features a supposed "erased" regular character.
- "Four Regrettings and a Funeral", a 2013 episode of The Simpsons that features a joke one-time character that supposedly was involved in the series's notable moments.
- "Adam", an episode of Torchwood that features an alien that manipulates the main characters into having false memories of him being a regular character.
- "Total Rickall", an episode of Rick and Morty which features alien parasites that convince the cast they have always been part of the family through fabricated flashbacks.
- Goncharov, a fictitious Martin Scorsese film known for having its plot details invented by Internet users.
- Herobrine, a hoax character purported to be from the video game Minecraft.
- Fiddlebert, a fan-made meme character jokingly claimed to have been removed from the Pikmin series.
- Ermac, a hoax character from Mortal Kombat who later became a playable character.
- Sheng Long, a hoax character purported to be from the video game Street Fighter II.
- Purple Francis, a fan-made meme character jokingly claimed to have been removed from Left 4 Dead.
