= Rombout II Keldermans =

Belgian Gothic architect

- Born: Rombout II Keldermans; 1460; Mechelen, Burgundian Netherlands
- Died: 15 December 1531 (aged 70–71); Antwerp, Habsburg Netherlands
- Occupation: Architect

Rombout II Keldermans (ca. 1460 in Mechelen – 15 December 1531 in Antwerp), was an important architect from the Gothic period, born from a family of architects and sculptors (see Keldermans family).

He was city architect of Mechelen and court architect for Charles V, Holy Roman Emperor, who elevated him into nobility.

He worked among others on the Onze-Lieve-Vrouw-over-de-Dijlekerk in Mechelen, the Cathedral of Our Lady in Antwerp, the Blue Tower palace in Gorinchem, and the city hall of Ghent.
