= Gum Spring =

Gum Spring or Gum Springs may refer to the following places in the United States:

- Gum Springs, Arkansas
- Gum Springs, Texas
- Gum Spring, Virginia
- Gum Springs, Virginia
- Gum Spring, West Virginia
