= List of glues =

There are many adhesive substances that are considered or commonly referred to as glue. Historically, the term only referred to protein colloids prepared from animal flesh. The meaning has been extended to refer to any fluid adhesive.

== Plant- and animal-based adhesives ==
Type	Subtypes	Source(s)	Manufacture	Chemistry	Volatiles	Safety	Properties	Shelf life	Working time	Setting	Strength	Solvents	Uses	Date
Roasted hydrocarbons	Tar, pitch, and asphalt/ bitumen	Made from plants (especially wood) or fossil hydrocarbons	natural or artificial destructive distillation	Hydrocarbon goo of no specific chemical formula	Emits Volatile organic compounds, especially when heated	health effects understudied (see Asphalt#Health and safety)	dark, viscous, more flexible when heated	Indefinite, may stiffen	Indefinite	Reversibly becomes more flexible and fluid when heated		water-repellant,	Sealant, hafting	prehistoric
Mixed-protein glues	Casein glue	Milk, limestone and brine	Milk curd is mixed with alkalis			non-toxic (preservatives excepted)		Once wet, 6–7 hours.		~4 hours for softwood, 8 for hardwood; must be under pressure for >0.5-2 hrs	tensile strength exceeds most woods, 2,200-3,00 pounds per square inch	water-resistant, depending on alkalis used	Woodworking, paper glue, fireproof laminates	Medieval or earlier
Mixed-protein glues	Soybean glue	As for casein glue, but using soy protein	Soy protein is mixed with alkalis											
Mixed-protein glues	Albumin glues (blood glues and egg albumin adhesive, EAA)	blood (serum albumin) or eggs												prehistoric
Gelatin glues	hide glue, including rabbit-skin glue; bone glue, and fish glue including isinglass	Animal connective tissue and bones	hides are acid-treated, neutralized, and repeatedly soaked; the soaking-water is dried into chips	hydrolyzed collagen					Until it cools	Thermoplastic. Somewhat brittle when set		Water-soluble	Cabinetmaking, bookbinding, lutherie, glue-size	
Keratin glues	Hoof glue and horn glue	hooves of ungulates, animal horns	Hooves or horns are fragmented, boiled into goo, and acidified	partially- hydrolyzed keratin					Until it cools	Thermoplastic. Hardens as it cools, but does not become brittle			Gluing and stiffening textiles, cabinetmaking, glass sealant	
Fibrin glue		human fibrinogen and human thrombin		when two parts are mixed, they form fibrin					10–60 seconds	converts to fibrin			Medicine	
Waxes	Beeswax	made by insects												
Starch glues	potato starch, rice glue, wheatpaste	starches (plant energy-storage chemicals)	Starch may be purified before being mixed with water; leaving gluten in makes a more permanent bond											
Dextrin glues	British gum, Coccoina	usually derived from potato starch												mid-19th century
Polysaccharide glues	mucilage, agar, algin													
Tree gums/resins	Balsam (fir) resins, such as Canada balsam, Dammar gum, Gum Arabic (also called acacia gum), Mastic													
Latex rubber cement (cow gum)		latex, a coagulating plant fluid, also made synthetically	latex is dissolved in an organic solvent		organic solvent evaporates as it sets	solvent may be hazardous; latex is an allergen								
Methyl cellulose		cellulose, a plant structural material, and methyl chloride	heating cellulose with an alkali and reacting it with methyl chloride											

== Solvent-type glues ==
Solvent adhesives temporarily dissolve the substance they are gluing, and bond by solvent-welding material together with the re-solidified material.

Type	Subtypes	Source(s)	Manufacture	Chemistry	Volatiles	Safety	Properties	Shelf life	Working time	Setting	Strength	Solvents	Uses	Date
Ketones	Acetone			dissolves ABS plastic	it is volatile									
Ketones	Polystyrene cement/Butanone/methyl ethyl ketone (MEK)			dissolves polystyrene	it is volatile	Vapour is heavier-than-air and explosive. Toxic, neuropsychological effects. Rapidly absorbed through undamaged skin and lungs. Produces toxic ozone.								
Dichloromethane				Dissolves: Polycarbonate; Polymethylmethacrylate (PMMA), commonly called "acrylic glass" among other brand names	it is volatile, boiling at 39.6°C (103.3°F; 312.8K)		Will also glue acrylic to wood. Clear, waterproof, exterior grades exist.			24 hours to set fully.				

== Synthetic glues ==
=== Synthetic monomer glues ===
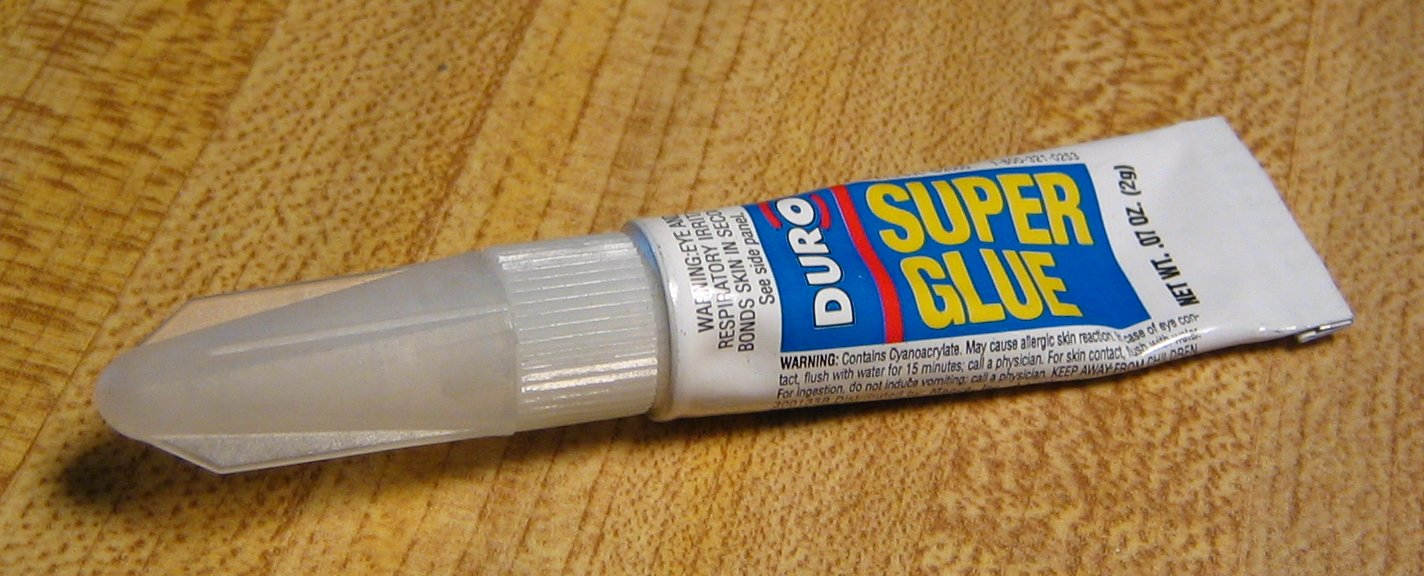
A tube of Super Glue cyanoacrylate

Type	Subtypes	Source(s)	Manufacture	Chemistry	Volatiles	Safety	Properties	Shelf life	Working time	Setting	Strength	Solvents	Uses	Date
Acrylonitrile				synthetic monomer										
Cyanoacrylate ("Superglue", "Krazy Glue")				synthetic monomer										
Methyl acrylate ("acrylic")				synthetic monomer										

=== Synthetic polymer glues ===
==== Thermoplastic polymers ====
Thermoplastic glues including hot-melt adhesives cure reversibly as they cool, like the gelatin and keratin glues listed above. They frequently don't emit volatiles unless overheated.

Type	Subtypes	Source(s)	Manufacture	Chemistry	Volatiles	Safety	Properties	Shelf life	Setting	Strength	Solvents	Uses	Date
Ethylene-vinyl acetate		synthetic	polyethylene mixed with about 11% vinyl acetate										
Polyolefins	(polyethylene, polypropylene, etc.)	synthetic							thermosetting				
Polyamides		synthetic											
Polyesters		synthetic											
Polyurethanes		synthetic											
Polycaprolactone		synthetic		biodegradable					very low melting temperature, 40–60 °C (104–140 °F) and heat conductivity means it can be moulded by hand. Can be used to mould itself.				

- Styrene acrylic copolymer – e.g. "No More Nails"

==== Thermosetting polymers ====
Thermosetting glues or thermosets cure irreversibly by polymerization. The polymerization can be triggered by heat or other radiation, or high pressure or a catalyst/hardener may be added.

Type	Subtypes	Source(s)	Manufacture	Chemistry	Volatiles	Safety	Properties	Shelf life	Working time	Setting	Strength	Solvents	Uses	Date
Phenol formaldehyde resins (PF), also called phenolic resins	Resorcinol glue, Para tertiary butylphenol formaldehyde resin	synthetic	resorcinol or similar is mixed with phenol to make a resin; cured by adding formaldehyde		offgasses phenol and formeldehyde	phenol and formeldehyde are toxic, PTBPF causes contact allergies	Temperature-, UV-, and microbe-resistant. No gap-filling; joint must fit tightly. Brown in colour, sands off.	A few years, unmixed.	Temperature-dependent. Will not cure at temperatures below 10 °C (50 °F).	Needs to be clamped	Structural	Water-soluble until set, waterproof after.	laminating plywood, especially for exterior use; woodworking	
Urea-formaldehyde glue		synthetic	urea and formaldehyde		offgasses urea and formeldehyde	formeldehyde is toxic, urea is an irritant					thermosetting			
Polysulfides		synthetic					Will melt acrylic, polycarbonate, ABS and PVC plastic. Can be used to glue nylon, epoxy, and polyoxymethylene.							

- Epoxy resins
  - Epoxy putty
- Polyvinyls
  - Polyvinyl acetate (PVA) Includes white glue (e.g. Elmer's Glue) and yellow carpenter's glue (Aliphatic resin) (Brands include Titebond and Lepage)
  - Polyvinyl alcohol
  - Polyvinyl chloride (PVC)
  - Polyvinyl chloride emulsion (PVCE) – a water-miscible emulsion that polymerizes as it cures
  - Polyvinylpyrrolidone (component of glue sticks)
- Silicone resins
- Silyl modified polymers

== By use ==
- Postage stamp gum may be a mixture of assorted starch and resin adhesives
- Library paste is usually starch-based
- Meat glue is a variety of culinary binding agents
