= Gum metal =

Titanium alloy with high elasticity

Gum metal, also called TNTZ, is a unique titanium alloy with high elasticity, ductility, and yield strength. While originally developed with a composition of 23% niobium, 0.7% tantalum, 2% zirconium, and 1% oxygen, it can exist over a range of compositions and also include vanadium and hafnium.

Applying cold work to gum metal actually decreases its elastic modulus, with reported shear moduli as low as 20 gigapascals (2,900,000 psi). At the same time, cold work increases gum metal's yield strength. By using a heat treatment after this cold work, some elasticity can be sacrificed for even greater strength, with yield strengths ranging as high as 2 gigapascals (290,000 psi), on par with some of the strongest steels.

"Gum metal" is a registered trademark of Toyota Central R&D Labs and was initially developed there. The results of that research were first published in April 2003.
