= Gummy (disambiguation) =

Gummy is a kind of gelatin candy.

Gummy or gummi may also refer to:

== Places and jurisdictions ==
- Gummi in Byzacena, a city and former bishopric in Roman Africa, now a Latin Catholic titular see
- Gummi in Proconsulari, a city and former bishopric in Roman Africa, now a Latin Catholic titular see
- Gummi, Nigeria, a local government area in Zamfara State, Nigeria

== Other ==
- Gummy (singer) (born 1981), Korean R&B singer
- Gummibär, a German international multi-lingual character and virtual band
- Gummi (software), a LaTeX editor for Linux/Gnome
- Gummy bear, a small, rubbery-textured confectionery in the form of a bear
- Gummi Bears (TV series), a Disney animated television series
- Gummy shark, a shark in the family Triakidae
- "Gummy (song)", 2017 song by Brockhampton
- Geummi (alternate spelling "Gummi"), member of Korean girl group Crayon Pop
- Gumy, a 2022 television series

== See also ==
- Gum (disambiguation)
