= Sunstar Group =

Japanese global manufacturing company

- Sunstar Group official logo

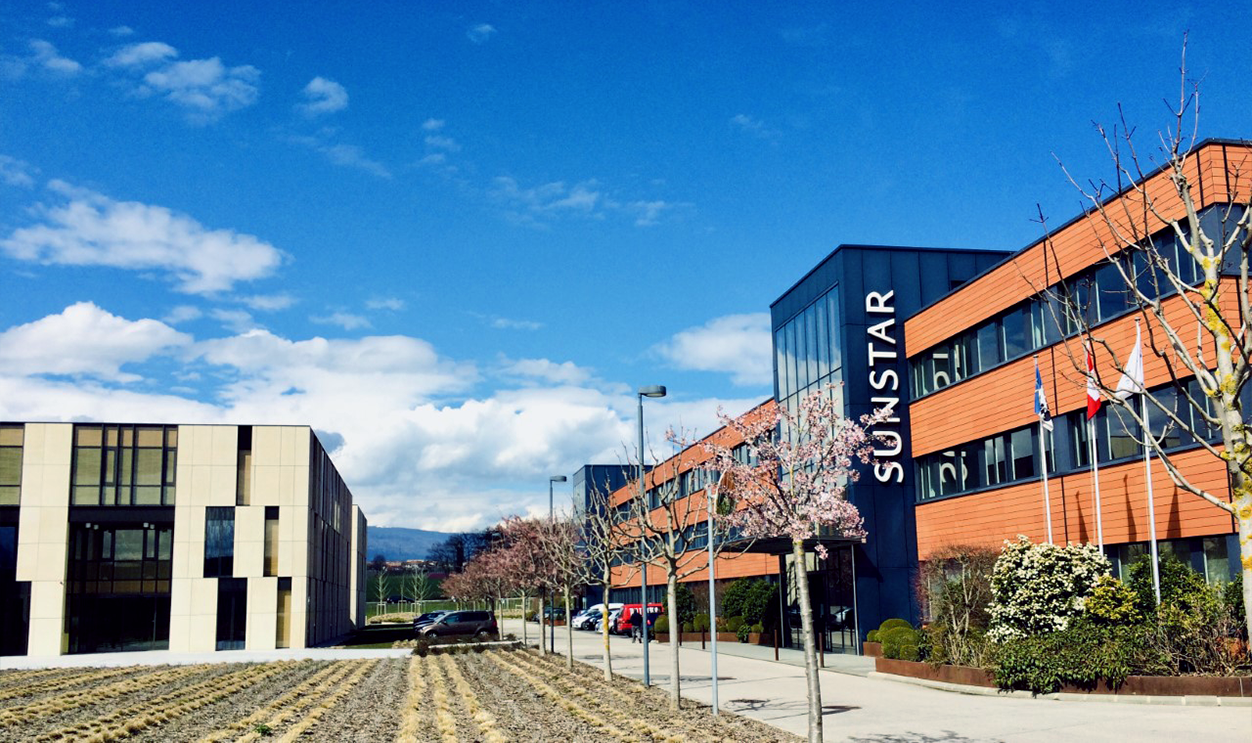
- Sunstar Group headquarters in Switzerland
- Type: Privately held company
- Industry: Oral care, chemical, and automotive
- Founded: 1932; 94 years ago Osaka, Japan
- Founder: Kunio Kaneda |ja| 金田邦夫
- Headquarters: Route de Pallatex 11, 1163 Etoy, canton of Vaud, Switzerland
- Area served: Worldwide
- Key people: Hiroo Kaneda, chairman emeritus
- Number of employees: 4,000
- Website: www.sunstar.com

Sunstar is a global conglomerate with origins in Japan going back to 1932. The corporation has two main wings, consumer and industrial. Its main consumer business is the development, manufacturing and sale of oral care products (toothpastes, interdentals, dental rinses and toothbrushes) globally marketed under the GUM brand. It also has a range of health food and beauty products in Japan. Its industrial wing accounts for around 40% of its revenue, and produces chemical formulations for industrial applications (automotive, construction and electronics industries) and motorcycle and automobile parts (sprockets and braking disks).

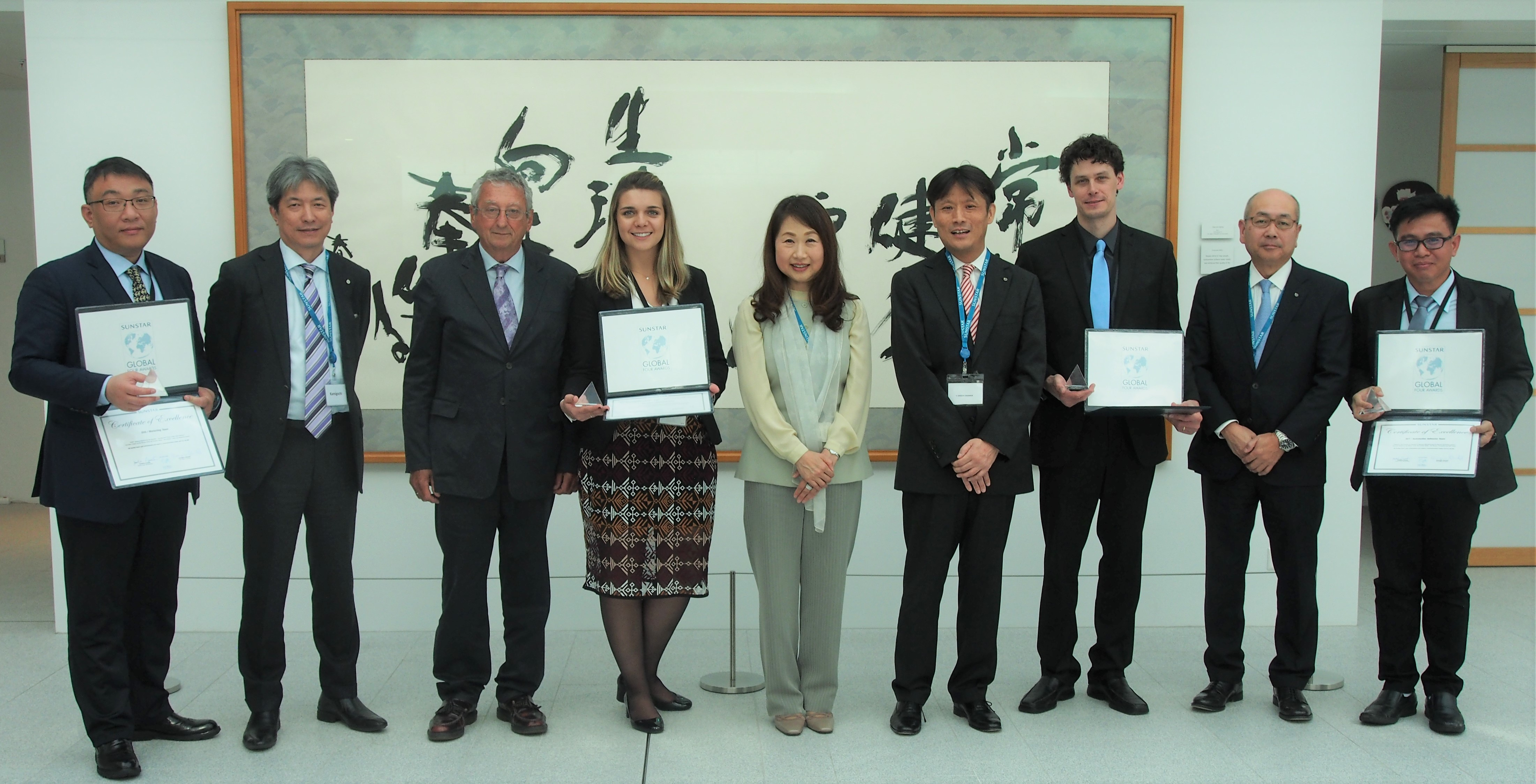
Sunstar annual employee global awards recipients (2019): Tony Shen, Adriana Grijo, Greg Carroll, Poothanabodee Kaewchengwang

Sunstar's founder, Kunio Kaneda, established the Kaneda Keitai Shokai Company in Osaka, Japan in 1932 as a seller of rubber glue for bicycles. The introduction of metal tubes for packaging of the rubber glue, and later also toothpaste, formed the basis for the early success of the business. The company has since become the leading oral care business in Japan, expanding over subsequent years to become a global business. The industrial business also has a leading position for several of its products in Japan and other markets. Group sales exceeded one billion United States dollars for the first time in the 1990s, and are now at $1.4 billion US per year.

After having been listed on the Osaka Securities Exchange since 1961, Sunstar undertook a management and employee buyout of all shares in 2007. The ownership of Sunstar Japan and the other group companies of the consumer goods. Business was transferred to Switzerland, and the industrial business to Singapore, in an effort to accelerate globalization.

Sunstar group instituted global awards to recognize outstanding contributions to dental hygiene.

== History ==
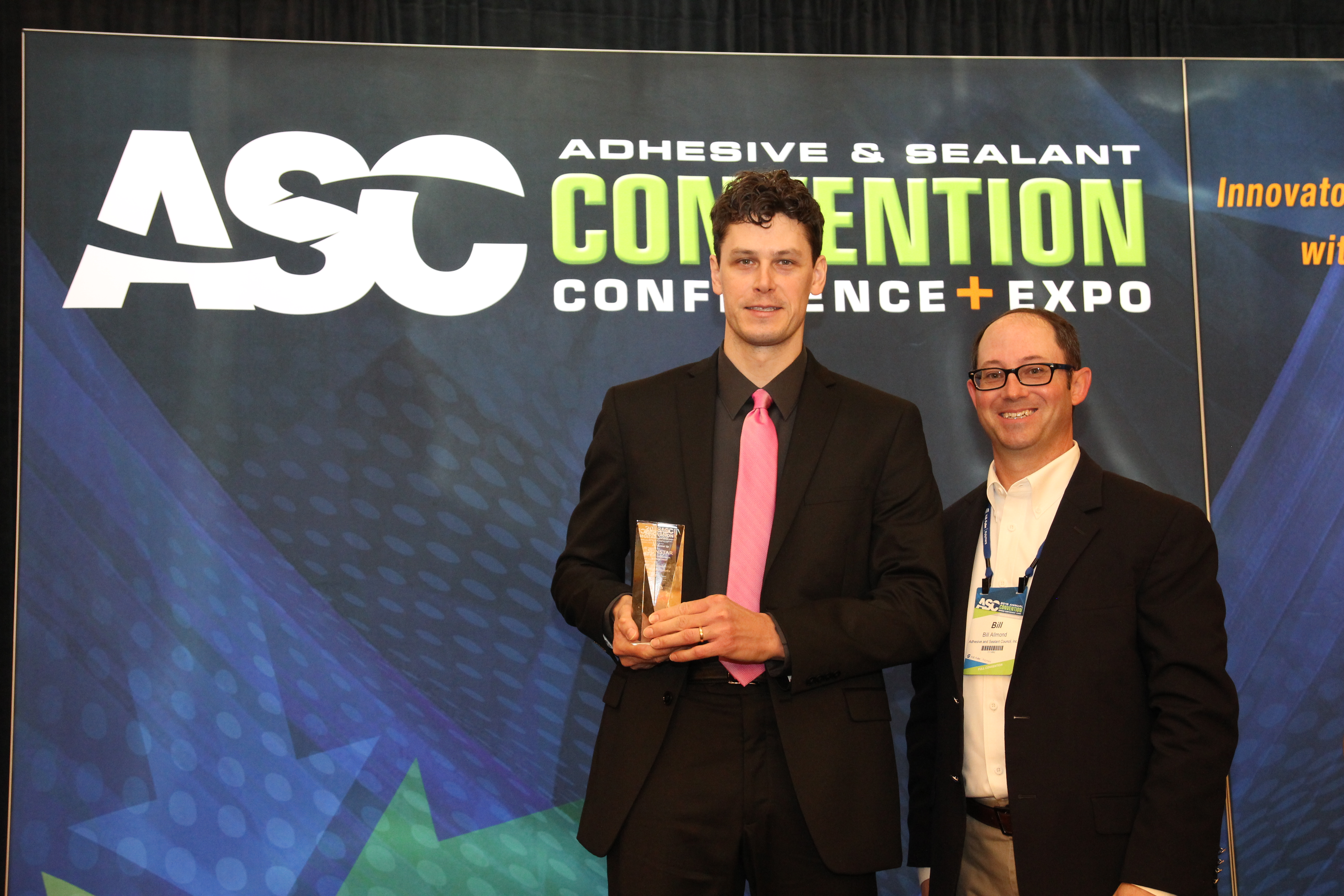
Sunstar Engineering Americas scientist, Dr. Gregory Carroll, accepts an Innovation Award from the Adhesives and Sealants Council at an ASC conference in Miami, FL for the development of UV cure foams.

Sunstar was founded in 1932 by Kunio Kaneda, who established the Kaneda Brother's Company as a distributor of bicycle parts in Osaka, Japan. In 1933, he started selling rubber glue for puncture repair packed in a small metal tubes. Until 1946, the company produced metal tubes and founded Kaneda Light Metal Tube Industries.

In 1946, the company developed its first toothpaste, in a metal tube. Also that year, the company engaged in the production of bicycle parts. In 1948, the company started to sell medical toothpaste.

In 1969, Hiroo Kaneda, Kunio's eldest son took up his father's mantle. Under Hiroo's leadership, Sunstar expanded globally over the next 60 years.

In 1988, Sunstar acquired the US dental manufacturer, J.O. Butler, Inc. 20 years later, in 2007, Sunstar started the transfer of the headquarters office functions to Switzerland and privatized ownership by management and employee share buyout (delisted from Osaka Securities Exchange).

Also in 2007, the Sunstar Foundation and International Federation of Dental Hygienists instituted the World Dental Hygienist Awards to recognize dental hygienists who have made significant contributions to dental hygiene science, or to patients, the community and the general public.

In 2008, the BUTLER SG series for mucosal erosion was launched.

In 2009, the headquarters building in Switzerland (Sunstar Suisse S.A., Etoy) was completed. In 2011, Sunstar Acquired Interbros GmbH (German toothbrush and interdental brush manufacturer) as well as Degradable Solutions AG (a Swiss bonegraft manufacturer). In 2013, Sunstar established a new product development center for the industrial and consumer business in Singapore. In 2014, the fine blanking automobile metal parts was expanded in Indonesia and Thailand. The company also opened a new base for the consumer business in Brazil.

In 2015, a new headquarters building in Etoy, Switzerland, was completed.

In 2018, Sunstar Engineering Americas won an Innovation Award from the Adhesives and Sealants Council (ASC) for "automated application of UV Curable Foams".

In 2019, Sunstar built a factory in Rain, Germany with an investment of 20 million Euros, however, a lack of progress after a highly celebrated opening has left many in the region wondering if the company is planning to leave. The intent was to manufacture newly developed structural adhesives by a product development group in the United States for German OEMs, however, a legacy polyurethane developed in Japan is mainly produced there. Earnings have been negative every year since construction up to at least the year ending Dec. 31, 2025.

In 2024, Sunstar announced a new global transformation program.

In 2025, Hiroo Kaneda was awarded the honorary title of chairman emeritus in recognition of his 60 years of leadership at Sunstar, as he left the board. Mayumi Kaneda was appointed as the family representative director, marking a generation change.
