= Silyl modified polymers =

Chemical compounds used in adhesives and sealants

Silyl-modified polymers (SMP; also silane-modified polymers, modified-silane polymers, MS polymers, silane-terminated polymers, etc.) are polymers terminating with a silyl group. SMPs are the main components in solvent-free and isocyanate-free sealant and adhesive products. Sealant products manufactured with silyl-modified polymers generally have most of the desirable properties of acrylic- or polyurethane-based products, including high opacity, short drying time, and good paint adhesion, as well as some key properties of silicone-based products, including adhesion to a wider range of substrate materials, higher temperature and UV resistance, higher elasticity, and greater resistance to bacteria and fungi.

MS polymers consist of a polyether backbone with dimethoxy-silyl or trimethoxy-silyl ends, with trimethoxy-silyl groups being more reactive. Backbones can be linear with single or double ends, or branched for an increased amount of cross linking. Precursors can also be varied in the molecular weight and reactive silyl group concentration, resulting in variable cure times, strength, density, and hardness.

== Curing process ==
The products cure from a liquid or gel state to a solid elastomer. Curing entails crosslinking by the hydrolysis of silyl ethers:

2 RSi(OCH_{3})_{2}R' + H_{2}O → [RSi(OCH_{3})R']_{2}O + 2 CH_{3}OH

In a hydrolysis reaction, a catalyst and moisture is required to form an intermediate silanol, which then reacts to form siloxane linkages in a condensation process.

== Applications ==
Silyl-modified polymers are widely used in the formulation of high-performance elastic sealants and adhesives for the construction industry, particularly in modern prefabricated building structures and concrete expansion joints. Due to their high movement capability and durability, SMP sealants accommodate environmental stressors such as thermal expansion and contraction without losing adhesion. Compared to traditional polyurethane and silicone materials, SMP-based sealants offer enhanced resistance to UV degradation, minimal bubble formation during moisture curing, and low volatile organic compound (VOC) emissions, often aligning with European environmental standards such as REACH compliance and GEV-EMICODE EC1PLUS certification.
