= Gumball =

Gumball may refer to:

- A ball made of gum often dispensed from a gumball machine
- Gumball (band), an alternative rock band from the 1990s
- Gumball (video game), a 1983 video game by Broderbund
- Gumball 3000, an international car rally
- Gumball Watterson, an animated character
  - The Amazing World of Gumball, an animated television series on Cartoon Network (2011–2019)
  - The Wonderfully Weird World of Gumball, a revival of the above show (2025–present)
- The Gumball Rally, a 1976 film
- Fruit from an American sweetgum, tree
- Prince Gumball, a character first appearing in the episode "Fionna and Cake" of the animated series Adventure Time

== See also ==
- Gum (disambiguation)
