= Gum Yuen =

Gum Yuen (October 1875 – 15 May 1943) was a Chinese Australian carpenter, local Chinese community leader, and restaurateur.

== Early life ==
Gum was born in October 1875 in Chung Gwok Village in Zhongshan, Guangdong, China, the second son of policeman Gang Poy and his wife Fong (née Young). Gum worked in a bakery after leaving school and emigrated to Australia in 1897, where he found work at the Melbourne-based Quong Hing furniture factory.

== Career ==
In 1903, he relocated to West Perth and was hired as a cabinet maker by fellow Guangdong native Yuen Hoy Poy at his furniture factory, See Wah & Co. On 15 June 1910, Gum married Australian-born May Sam at the Methodist Church in West Perth.

The same year, he became a founding member of the Chung Wah Association in Perth, and was elected as its secretary and treasurer. In these roles Gum was in charge of buying land and building a hall for the association in James Street. Gum's family came to Australia in 1911, taking his wife and their son back to China with them. Gum returned to his home country for a year in 1914 and his wife gave birth to another son.

Together with his Chinese friends Yen Hay Hoy and Mew Toy, Gum became the owner and manager of the Perth-based furniture factory J. W. Wing & Co. by 1916. In 1921, Gum helped to organise a Kuomintang charter in Perth. He went back to China again in June 1923. This time, he returned to Australia with his wife and two sons; shortly afterwards, his third son was born.

In 1933, Gum became the sole proprietor of J. W. Wing & Co. after his two partners retired. Having started out with around eight Chinese workers in his employ, he now had fourteen Chinese and four European workers under him. The company mainly supplied furniture made from woods like jarrah, Tasmanian oak, and pine to local firms like W. Zimpel and Bairds Co.

== Later years ==
In 1930, together with Guangdong herbalist Yuen Bow, Gum established the Nanking Cafe in Barrack Street, Perth, serving both Chinese and Europeans. During World War II, Gum was the treasurer of the Chinese Patriotic Society which financially backed those fighting against the Japanese in China.

Gum died on 15 May 1943 in his residence at Newcastle Street. The cause of death was chronic emphysema. He was buried in Karrakatta Cemetery. His furniture factory closed in 1951.
