= Nick Ervinck =

Belgian artist

Nick Ervinck (born 1981) is a Belgian artist.

== Biography ==
Ervinck was born in 1981, in Kortemark. From the age of 15, he studied at the Academie voor Schone Kunsten in Bruges and at the Royal Academy of Fine Arts (KASK) in Ghent.

== Work ==
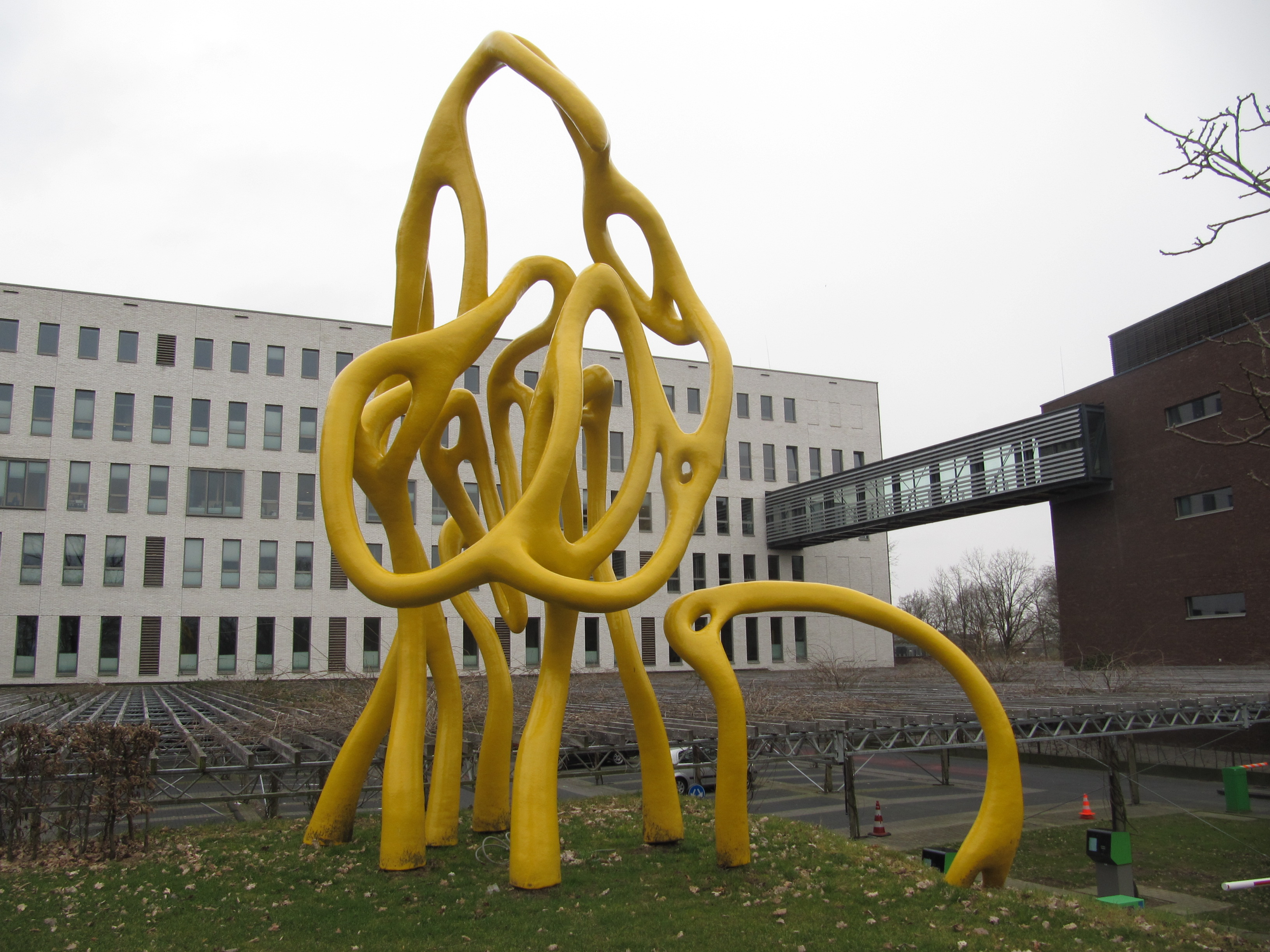
Sculpture LUCE in front of the Meander Medical Center in Amersfoort, The Netherlands

Ervinck creates, in his own words, a dialogue between craft and technology and between the virtual and the physical. His shapes are inspired by the work of Henry Moore (1898–1986), Barbara Hepworth (1903–1975), and Hans Arp (1886–1966). The futuristic blob architecture (a term of Greg Lynn) and the work of Zaha Hadid also inspire him. Ervinck often used the color yellow in his work, but he has also used other colors. ^{[1]}

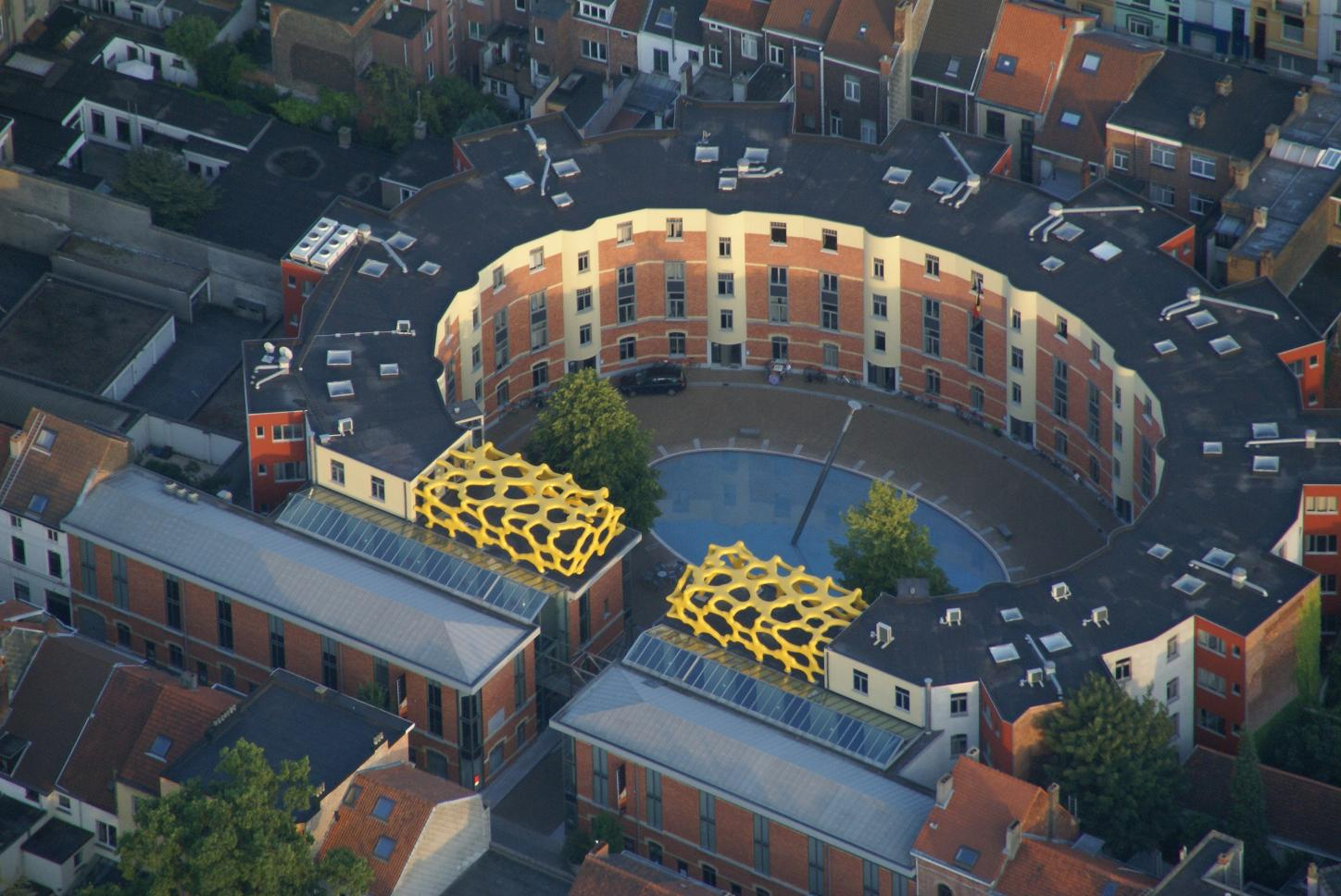
Aerial view of Zebrastraat with roof sculpture by Nick Ervinck

In 2008, Ervnick conceived on behalf of the Liedts-Meessens two terraces for which its site in Ghent Zebrastraat. The work was called WARSUBEC. Afterwards followed monumental works in public and private collections, including: NARZTALPOKS (Our Farm, Bruges), LUIZADO (Gallo-Roman Museum, Tongeren), IMAGROD (Milho, Ostend), CIRBUATS (A large yellow "blob" in the form of a chair in the Zebra, Ghent, where a bar is located^{[2]}), EGNOABER (Emmen)^{[3]}. For NK Cycling in Emmen 2015 Ervinck designed the trophy entitled ENNERNEISE.^{[3]}

In 2016, he designed the trophy for the cycling race, Gent–Wevelgem.

Ervinck has investigated alongside more conventional work also known as the "artistic possibilities of the digital revolution". The boundaries of the virtual space he wants to make tangible the complex forms of 3D prints that are impossible to do manually (such AGRIEBORZ 2009). He also makes 3D printing, animation videos, digital and ordinary drawings interact with each other.

== Awards ==
Ervink received from 2000 several awards and nominations:

- Stimulant, 2001.
- Provincial prize for visual arts of West Flanders in 2002 (nominated).
- Godecharle for sculpture, 2005.
- Provnciale prize for visual arts of West Flanders, 2006 (laureate).
- Médiatine Prize of the city of Brussels in 2006.
- Cultuurprijs 2006–2007, municipality Kortemark, 2007.
- Award of New Media, Liedts-Meesen Foundation, 2008.
- Rodenbachfonds Award 2008 (winner).
- Golden Phoenix, Culture Prize of Houtland, 2011 (laureate).
- CoD + A Award - Merit winner in the category "Liturgical" with IMAGROD, 2013
