= GumCo =

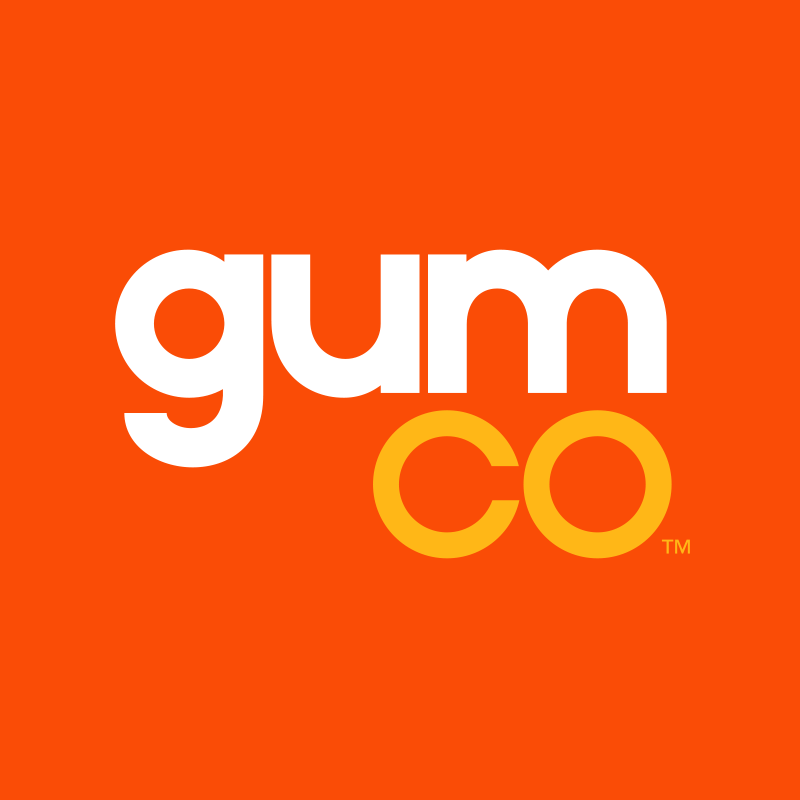
- Type: Privately held
- Industry: Advertising, Marketing
- Founded: Salt Lake City, Utah (2013)
- Founder: Steve Driggs
- Website: www.gumco.com

GumCo is an advertising agency in Salt Lake City, Utah.

== History ==
GumCo was founded in 2013 by Steve Driggs, Phil Smallwood, and Garrett Martin. The three partners met at Struck, where Steve worked as partner and executive creative director for seven years.

== Services ==
GumCo specializes in advertising, design, digital, social media, direct marketing, and brand strategy.

== Notable Campaigns ==
Some of their notable campaigns include Pikes Peak and Wounded Warrior Homes, for which they received the 2014 Utah American Advertising Foundation "Best in Show" award for their spot "You Are Not Alone," directed by Ed McCulloch.
