= Meerle =

- Village
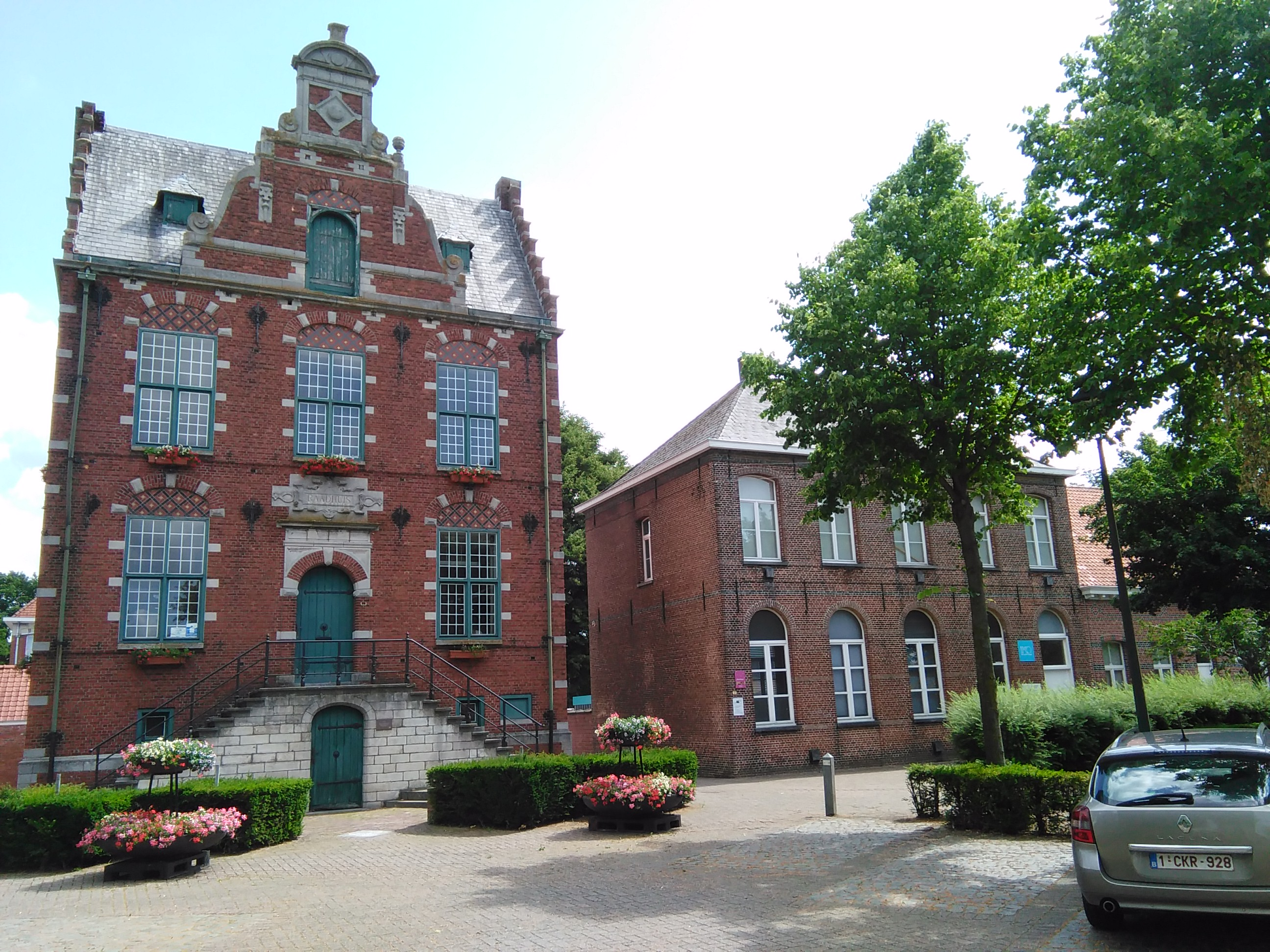
- Former town hall and clergy house

- Location in Belgium
- Coordinates: 51.4733°N 4.8036°E
- Country: Belgium
- Region: Flemish Region
- Province: Antwerp
- Municipality: Hoogstraten

Area
  - Total: 24.66 km^{2} (9.52 sq mi)

Population (2021)
  - Total: 3,671
  - Density: 148.9/km^{2} (385.6/sq mi)
- Time zone: CET

Meerle is a village in the Belgian municipality of Hoogstraten in the province of Antwerp. As of 2021, it has about 3,871 inhabitants.

== History ==
The village was first mentioned in 1266 as Meerle, and means "open forest near a lake/pond". The Thorn Abbey used to have many possessions in Meerle, and the village originally belonged to the Land of Breda. During the 14th century, the possessions were gradually transferred to the Lord of Hoogstraten. After the French Revolution, Meerle became an independent municipality. The village was mainly an agricultural village with an emphasis on livestock. During the 20th century, it increasingly became a residential town. Meerle was an independent municipality until 1977 when it was merged into Hoogstraten.

== Gallery ==
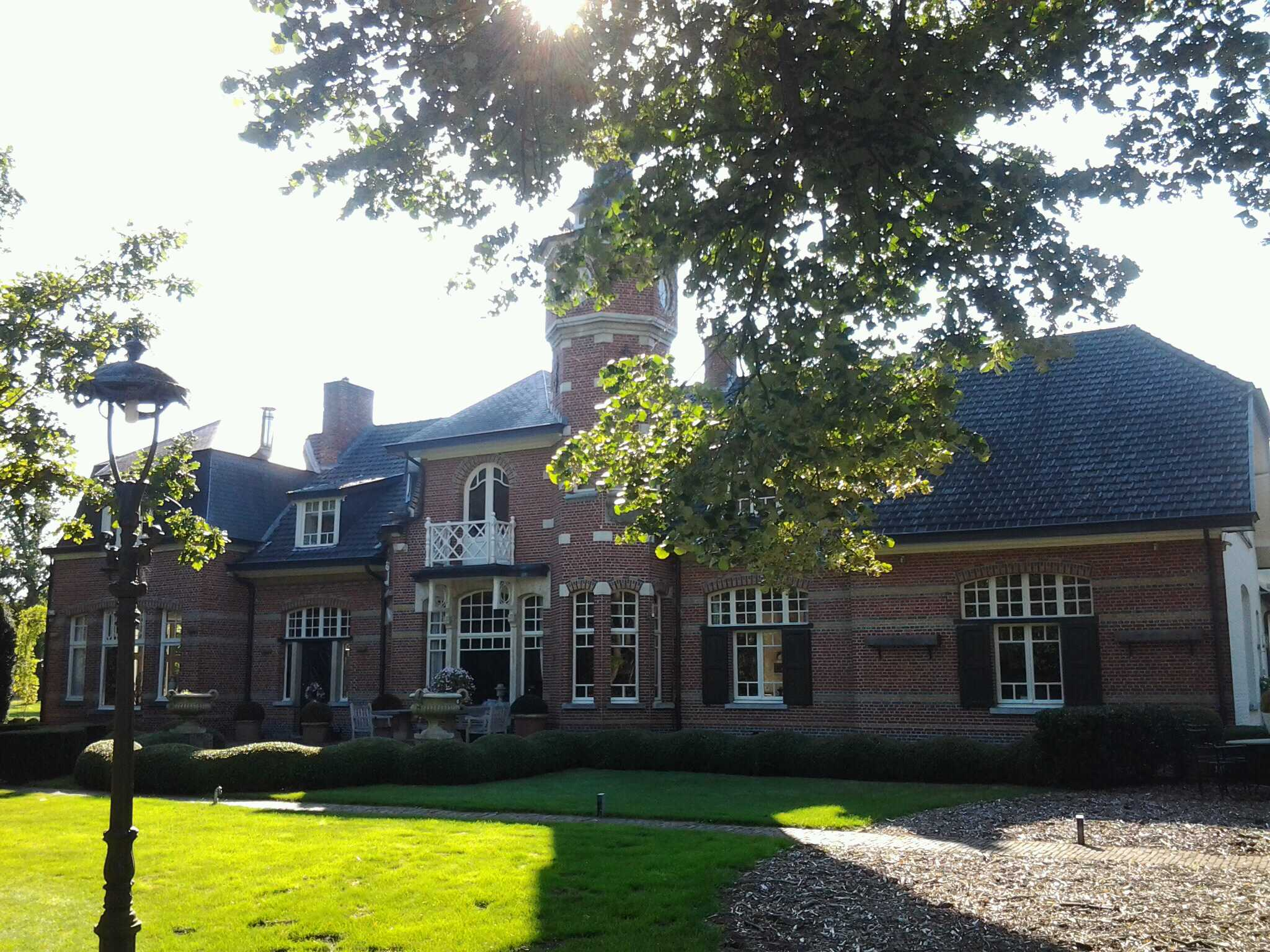
Manor house Sint-Jorisburg

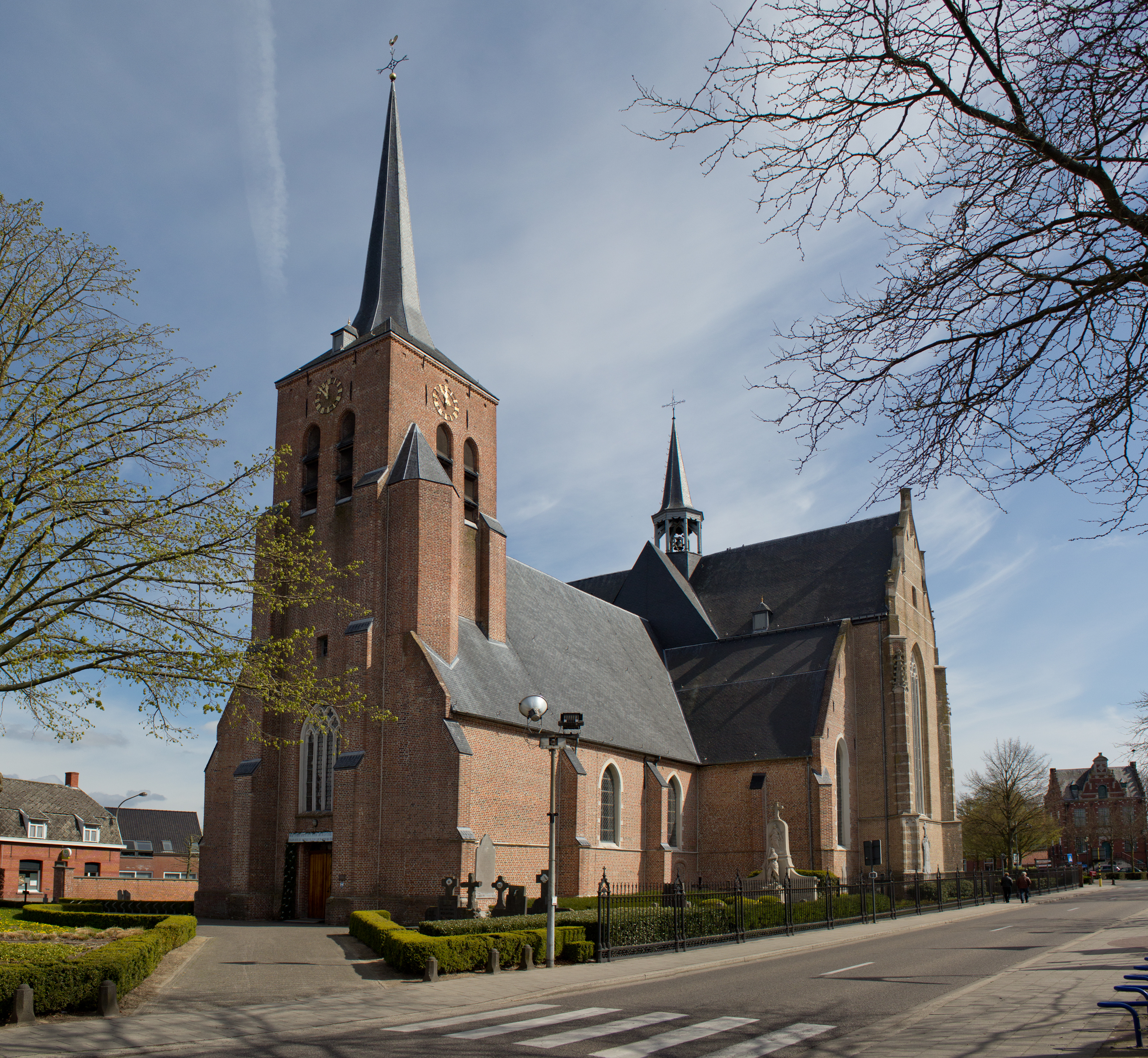
St Salvator Church

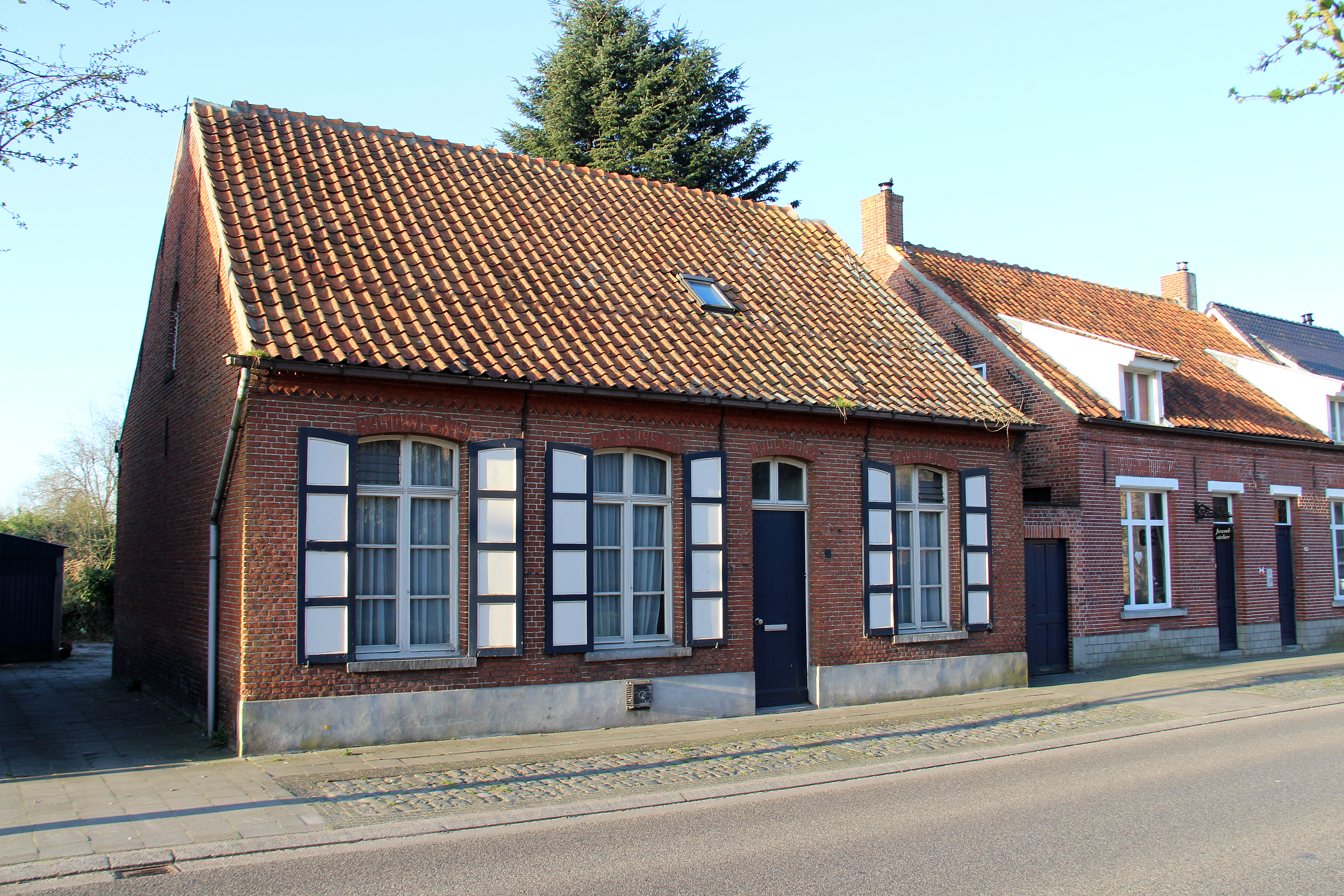
House in Meerle

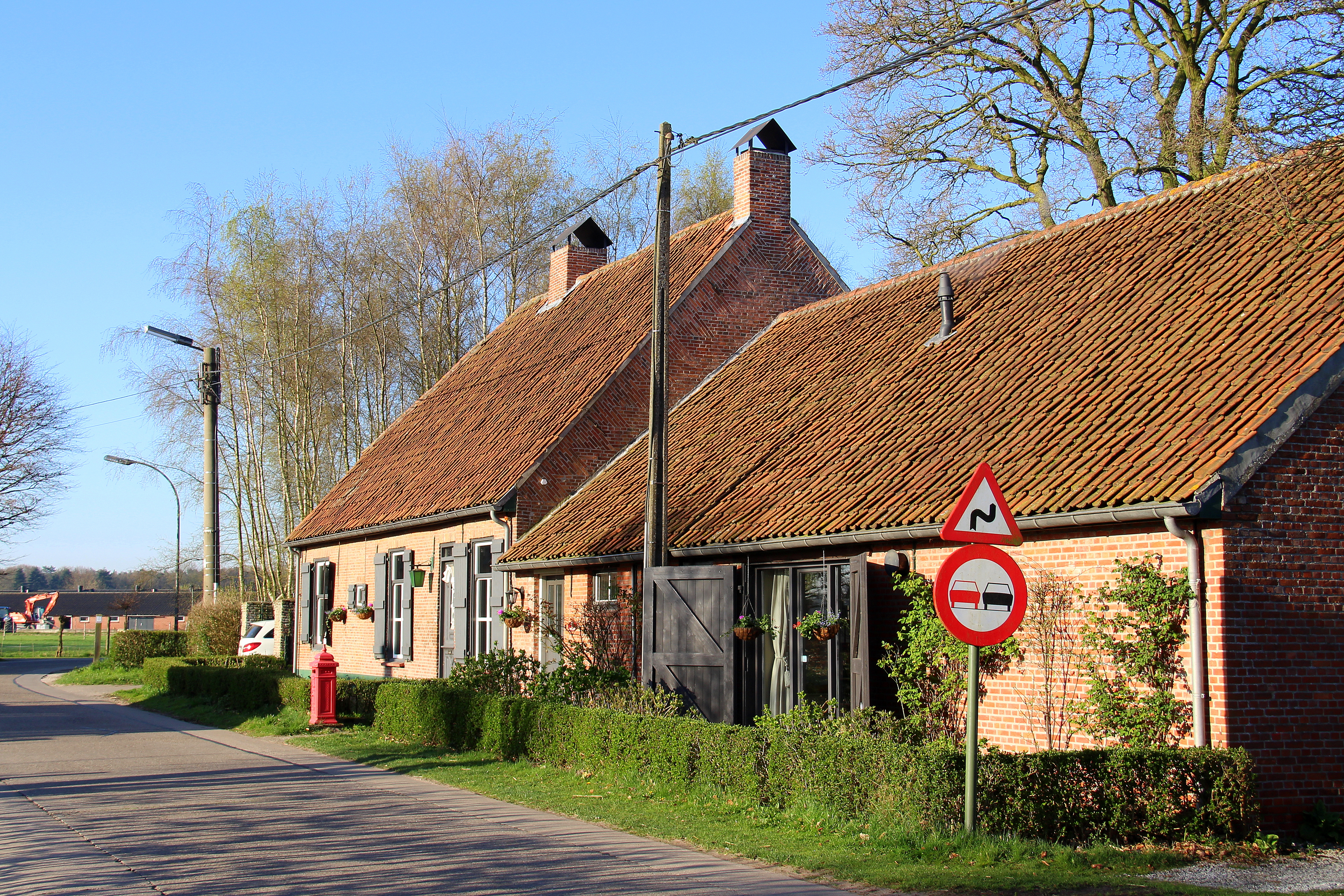
Miller's house
