= Gumbo (surname) =

Gumbo is the surname of the following notable people:

- Aleck Gumbo (born 1940), Minister of Economic Development in Zimbabwe
- Joram Gumbo, Zimbabwean politician
- Judy Gumbo (born 1943), Canadian-American activist
- Nicholas Gumbo, Kenyan politician
- Rahman Gumbo, Zimbabwean football player and manager
- Rashid Chidi Gumbo (born 1988), Tanzanian football midfielder
- Rugare Gumbo, Zimbabwean politician
- Sithembile Gumbo (1962/1963–2019), Zimbabwean politician
