= Gum-Gum =

Google

Coordinates: 5.9805°N 117.9296°E

Gum-Gum is a township of Sandakan, Sabah, Malaysia. It is situated about 25 km from Sandakan town along Labuk Road.
