= Gustaaf =

Gustaaf may refer to:

- Gustaaf Van Cauter, (born 1948), former racing cyclist
- Gustaaf Deloor (1913–2002), Belgian road racing cyclist
- Gustaaf Eeckeman (1918–1975), Belgian football left winger
- Gustaaf Adolf van den Bergh van Eysinga (1874–1957), Dutch theologian
- Boudewijn Albert Karel Leopold Axel Maria Gustaaf (1930–1993), King of the Belgians from 1951 until his death
- Gustaaf Hermans (born 1951), former Belgian cyclist
- Gustaaf Bernard Jozef Hiltermann (1914–2000), Dutch journalist, jurist, political commentator, publisher, historian
- Gustaaf Hulstaert (1900–1990), Belgian missionary in the Belgian Congo from 1925
- Gustaaf van Hulstijn (1884–1976), Dutch fencer
- Gustaaf Willem van Imhoff (1705–1750), Dutch colonial administrator for the Dutch East India Company
- Gustaaf Joos (1923–2004), prelate of the Diocese of Ghent
- Julius Gustaaf Arnout Koenders (1886–1957), Surinamese teacher and fervent activist for Sranan Tongo
- Gustaaf Lauwereins (born 1941), Belgian judoka
- Adolf Gustaaf Lembong (1910–1950), Indonesian military officer involved in guerrilla warfare against Japan in the Philippines during World War II
- Gustaaf Adolf Maengkom (1907–1984), former Indonesian Minister of Justice in the Djuanda Cabinet and Indonesian ambassador to Poland
- Gustaaf Adolf Frederik Molengraaff (1860–1942), Dutch geologist, biologist and explorer
- Gustaaf Martinus Oosterling (1873–1928), early Surinamese photographer
- Gustaaf Pelsmaecker or Auguste Pelsmaeker (1899–1976), Belgian footballer
- Gustaaf Van Roosbroeck (born 1948), Belgian professional road bicycle racer
- Gustaaf Sap or Gustave Sap (1886–1940), Belgian politician and minister for the Catholic Party
- Gustaaf Schlegel (1840–1903), Dutch sinologist and field naturalist
- Gustaaf Segers (1848–1930), Flemish writer, Dutch and German teacher and Vondel scholar
- Gustaaf Van Slembrouck (1902–1968), Belgian professional cyclist from 1926 to 1934, nicknamed 'Den Staf'
- Gustaaf De Smet (1935–2020), Belgian cyclist
- Gustaaf Sorel (1905–1981), Belgian painter and draughtsman
- Gustaaf Uhlenbeek (born 1970), Dutch former footballer
- Gustaaf Wappers (1803–1874), Belgian painter

== See also ==
- Gustav (disambiguation)
- Gustavia (disambiguation)
- Gustavo
- Gustov
