= Huet =

Huet may refer to:

People

- Alfred Huet du Pavillon (A.Huet, 1829-1907), a botanist
- Conrad Busken Huet (1826–1886), Dutch literary critic
- Cristobal Huet (born 1975), French ice hockey goaltender
- Edmond Huet, Paris Metro engineer
- Gérard Huet (born 1947), French computer scientist
- Guénhaël Huet (born 1956), French politician
- Gustavo Huet (born 1912), Mexican Olympic shooter
- Henri Huet (1927–1971), French war photographer killed in Vietnam
- Jan Huet (1903–1976), Belgian stained glass painter
- Jean-Baptiste Huet (1745–1811), French painter and designer
- Judith Benhamou-Huet, French journalist and art specialist
- Marie Huet, French painter and fashion designer
- Paul Huet (1803–1869), French painter
- Pierre Daniel Huet (1630–1721), bishop of Soissons
- Sophie Huet (1953-2017), French journalist
- Thomas Huet (died 1591), Welsh biblical scholar

Other uses

- Helicopter Underwater Escape Training
