= Bijdragen tot de Geschiedenis =

- Discipline: History of the Low Countries
- Language: Dutch

Publication details
- History: 1902-1914; 1924-2005
- Publisher: UFSIA (Belgium)
- Frequency: Quarterly

Standard abbreviations
- ISO 4: Bijdr. Geschied.

Indexing
- ISSN: 0006-2286
- OCLC no.: 609453517

Bijdragen tot de Geschiedenis was a Belgian history journal, published from 1902 to 2005. The journal was initially published in Hoogstraten from 1902 to 1914 under the title Bijdragen tot de Geschiedenis, inzonderheid van het aloude Hertogdom Brabant ("Contributions to history, particularly of the former duchy of Brabant"). Publication was disrupted by the First World War. It was continued from 1924 as Bijdragen tot de Geschiedenis. The continuation was published first by the Zuid-Nederlandsche Maatschappij voor Taalkunde en Geschiedenis, and later by the History Department of UFSIA (University Faculties Saint Ignatius Antwerp).
