= Benhamou =

Benhamou is a surname common in the Maghreb, meaning "son of Hayyim". It is typically used by Jews.

Notable people with the name include:

- Éric Benhamou (born 1955), IT professional and businessman
- Daphna Poznanski-Benhamou (born 1950), French politician
- Judith Benhamou-Huet, French journalist and art specialist
- Mohamed Benhamou (born 1979), Algerian footballer
- Belkasem Benhamou Abasri (born 1962 in Tahla) Moroccan Jewish Soldier.
- Françoise Benhamou (Moroccan-French) member of the ARCEP.
- Jamal Benhamou Moroccan American Amazigh activist and professor
