= Gustov =

Gustov or Hustov (Russian: Густов) is a Russian masculine surname, its feminine counterpart is Gustova. Notable people with the surname include:

- Vadim Gustov (born 1948), Russian politician
- Vladimir Gustov (born 1961), Russian guitarist, arranger, composer and sound producer
- Volodymir Hustov (born 1977), Ukrainian cyclist

== See also ==
- Gustov C. Lerch House in Iowa, United States
