= Maurits Van Hoeck =

Belgian author (1890–1950)

- Born: 30 September 1890; Hoogstraten, Belgium
- Died: 1 August 1950 (aged 59); Antwerp, Belgium
- Occupations: Priest, poet, writer, composer, translator, critic

Maurits Van Hoeck (30 September 1890 – 1 August 1950) was a Belgian poet, writer, composer, translator, and critic.

He was born in 1890 in Hoogstraten, Belgium. He served as a Roman Catholic priest and writer. Van Hoeck died in Antwerp in 1950.
