= Julius Gustaaf Arnout Koenders =

Surinamese writer

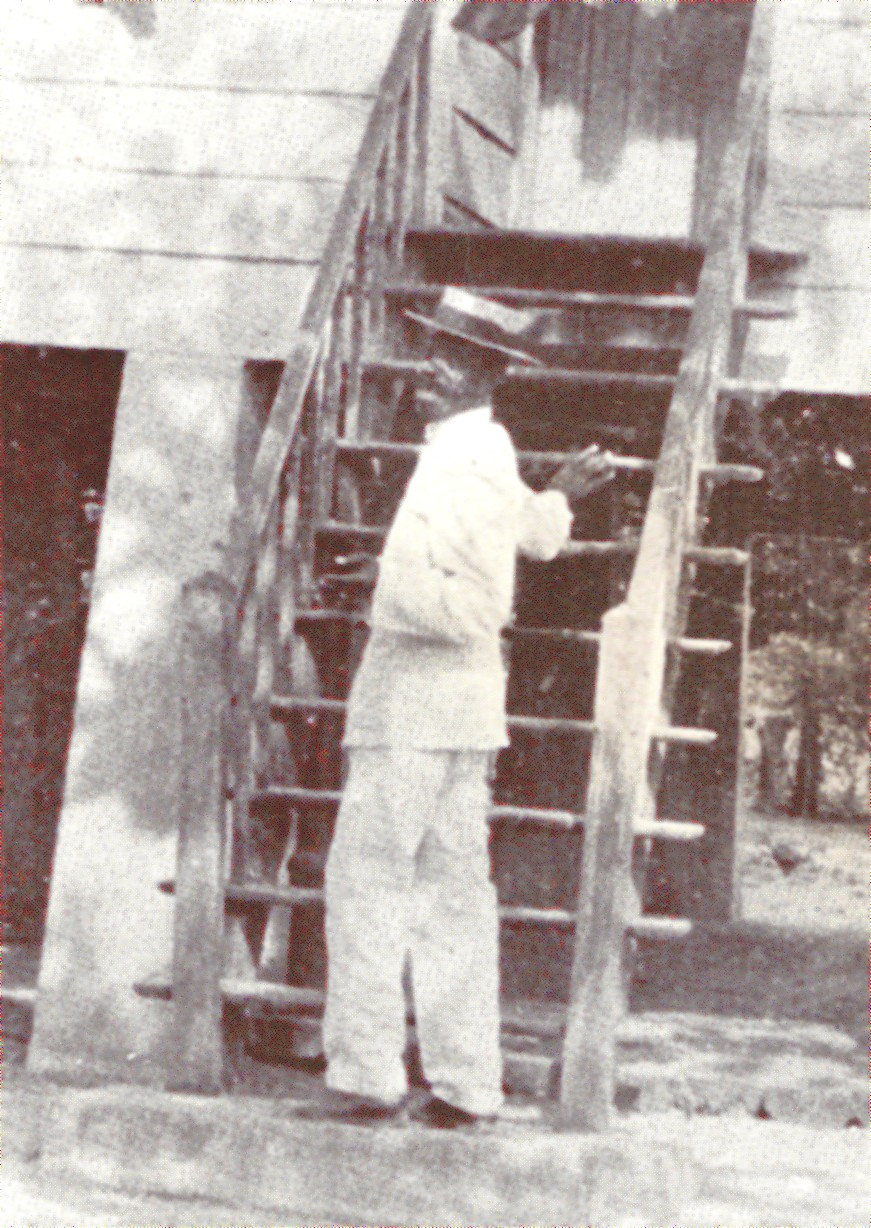
- The only known photo of 'Papa Koenders'
- Born: 1 March 1886; Paramaribo, Surinam
- Died: 17 November 1957 (aged 71)
- Other names: Papa Koenders; Kris Kras
- Occupations: Teacher activist
- Notable work: Foetoe-boi

Julius Gustaaf Arnout Koenders (1 March 1886 – 17 November 1957) was a Surinamese teacher and fervent activist for Sranan Tongo. As a teacher, he was forced to use the Dutch language thus denying the children their own language. He was an early advocate of Sranan and Creole culture.

== Writer ==
In 1943, the women's organisation Pohama asked Koenders to help them. Pohama consisted of about 20 women who wanted to strengthen the education of their children and make them proud of their own heritage. Pohama organised cultural evenings in theatre Thalia in Paramaribo, and was known for their 1 July event to remember the emancipation of slavery in Suriname. Koenders wrote his first publication for them called Foe memre wi afo [In memory of our forefathers] about the Creole language, and went to write much more for the organisation.

Even though most of his literary work consisted of translations of existing work into Sranan Tongo, Koenders was influential in inspiring the next generation like Eddy Bruma and Trefossa.

Koenders also wrote articles in Dutch about education in De schakel tussen school en huis (The bridge between school and home) using the pseudonym Kris Kras. The magazine was published every two weeks and was bundled with Dagblad Suriname.

== Foetoe-boi ==
Foetoe-boi was a monthly periodical he published with the association Pohama from May 1946 to April 1956, and was the editor responsible for it, though other authors were involved. It was published in both Sranan Tongo and Dutch, with many articles based on his own ideals. The cultural association Wie Eegie Sanie which was founded in 1951 by Eddy Bruma would continue Koenders' pioneering work after Foetoe-boi stopped.

== Other publications ==
- Foe memre wi afo, 1 juli 1863 1943, 'Het Surinaamsch in een nieuw kleed', (Met oefeningen) ("To commemorate our ancestors, 1 July 1863 – 1943, 'Surinamese in a new dress' (With exercises)", 1943)
- 60 moi en bekentie singie na Sranantongo ("60 beautiful and well-known songs in Sranan", 1944)
- Aksie mie, mie sa piekie joe foe wie skien ("Ask me, I will answer you about our body", 1945)

About Koenders:

- Op zoek naar Papa Koenders (2019)
