= Gustaaf Martinus Oosterling =

Surinamese photographer

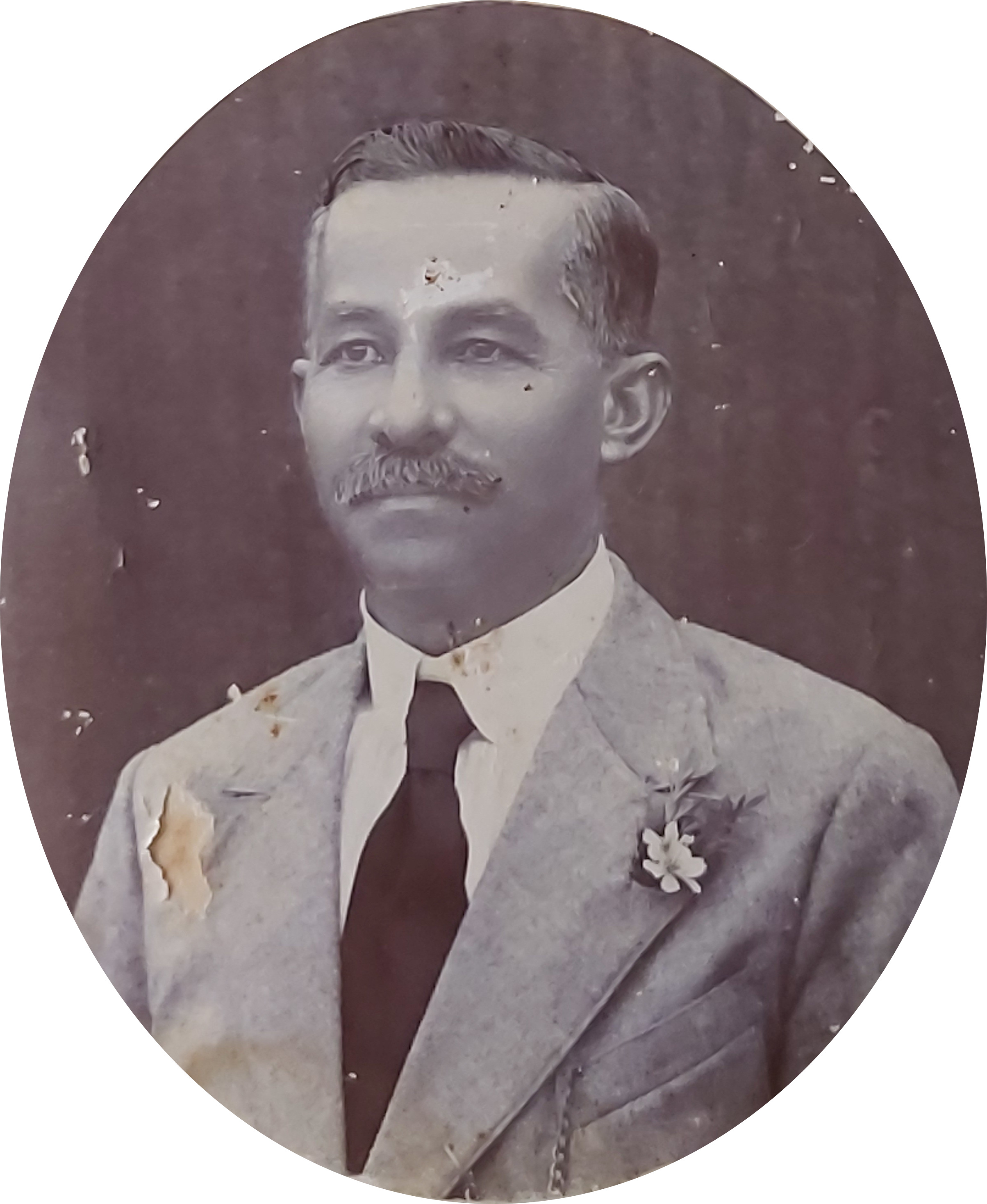
- Born: 30 June 1873; Paramaribo, Suriname
- Died: 11 January 1928 (aged 54); Paramaribo, Suriname
- Spouse: Louisa Ferdina Flu (m. 1905)

Gustaaf Martinus Oosterling (30 June 1873 – 11 January 1928) was a Surinamese photographer, who had a photo studio on the Gonggrijpstraat in Paramaribo. Before turning to photography, Oosterling worked as a draughtsman, calligrapher and painter. Together with Augusta Curiel, Karl Friedrich Ludwig Eugen Klein, Julius Eduard Muller, W. Amo and Théodore van Lelyveld, he is considered a pioneer of photography in Suriname.

== Biography ==
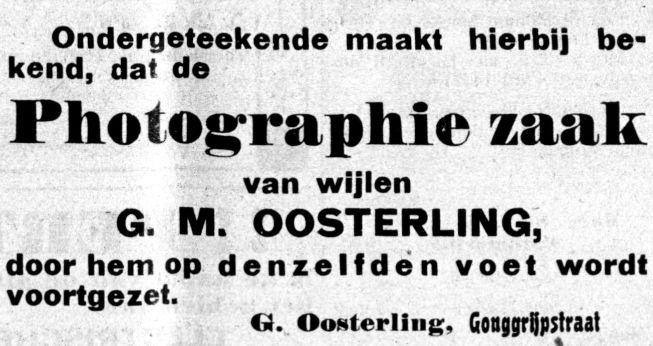
Announcement by Guillaume David Oosterling that he will continue his father's photo studio after his father's death on 11 January 1928.

Gustaaf Martinus Oosterling was born on 30 June 1873 in Paramaribo to Salomon Jacob Oosterling (1841–1885) and Nanette Louisa Sophia Bosfaeld (1839–1878). His grandfather Cornelis Oosterling (1813–1858) was originally from Groede in Zeeland and migrated to Suriname in the early 19th century.

Oosterling died on 11 January 1928 at age 54. His studio was continued by his son Guillaume David Oosterling.

== Personal life ==
Gustaaf Martinus Oosterling married Louisa Ferdina Flu in October 1905. In the 1921 Suriname census, there are five daughters and four sons listed as living with him and his wife on Gonggrijpstraat 69. Oosterling and his family were members of the Free Evangelical Church of Paramaribo.

== Gallery ==
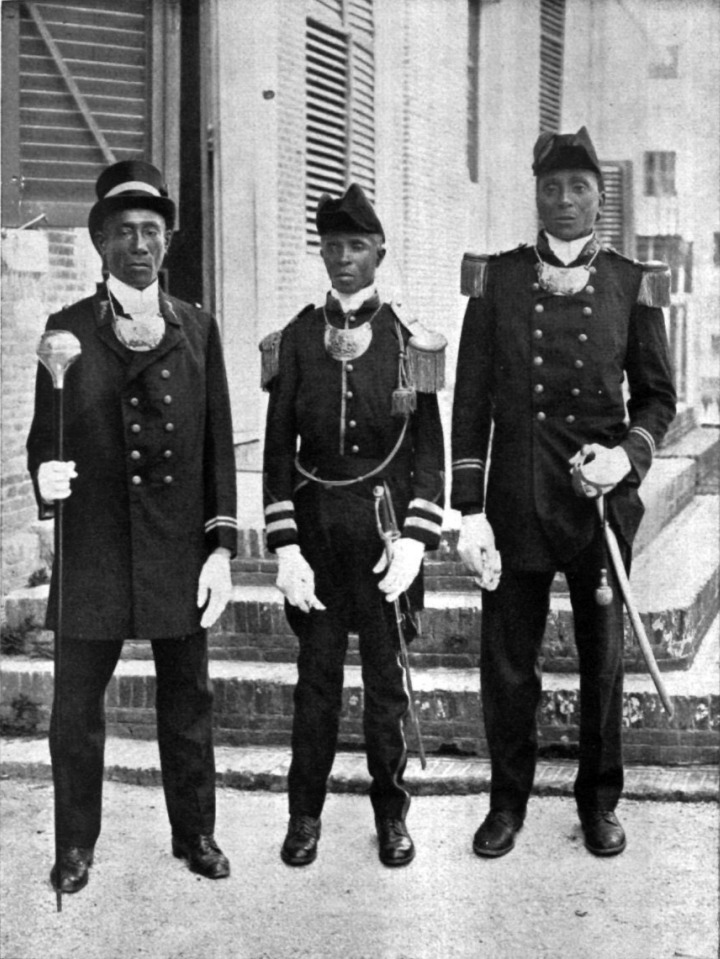
Portrait of Ndyuka dignitaries gaanfisikali Gagu, gaanman Amakiti and edekabiten Kanape

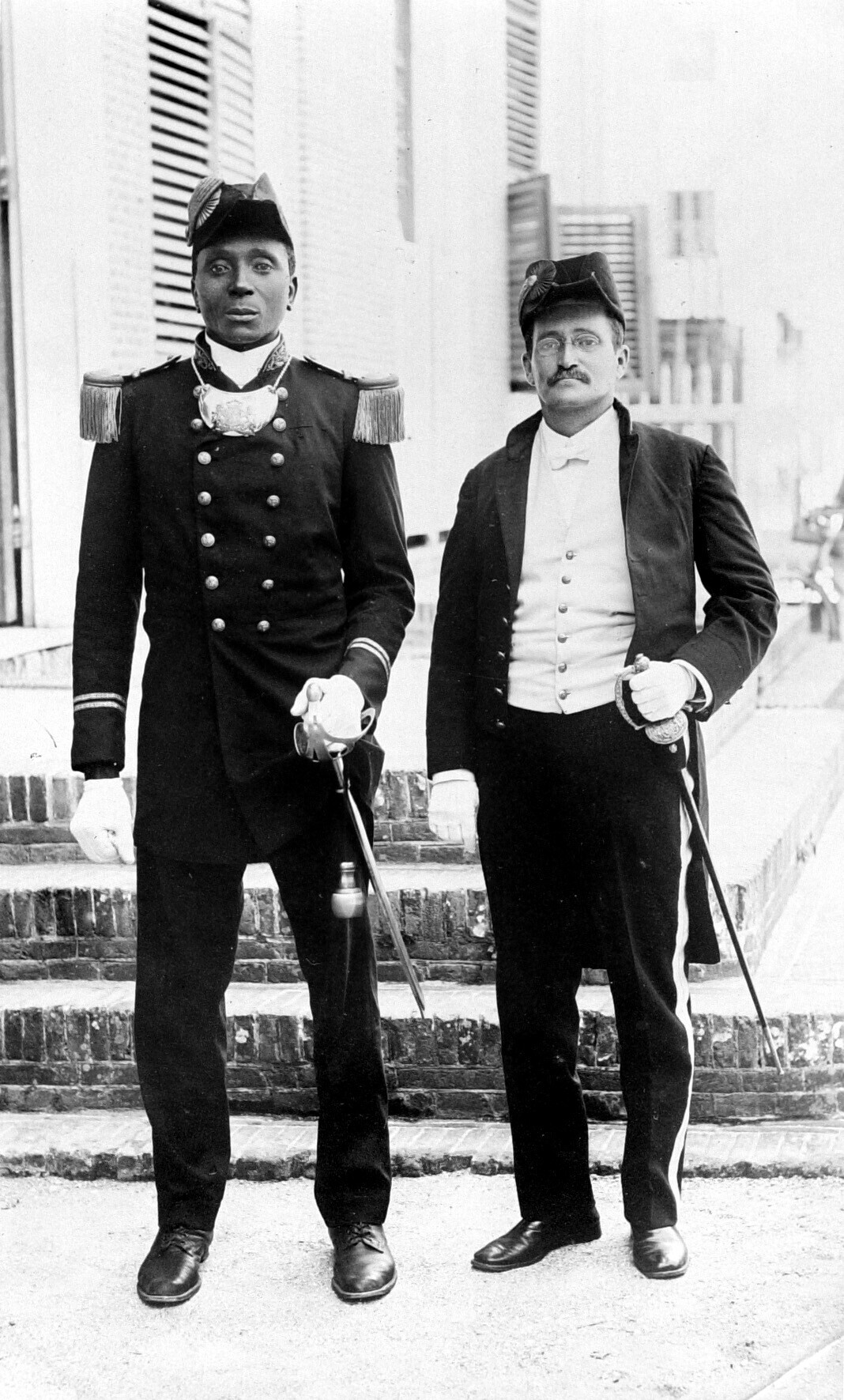
Portrait of Yensa Kanape and Willem Frederik van Lier
