= Gustaaf Segers =

Flemish writer, Dutch and German teacher and Vondel scholar

- Born: 29 December 1848; Hoogstraten, Belgium
- Died: 3 April 1930 (aged 81); Hoogstraten, Belgium
- Occupations: Novelist, scholar, teacher

Gustaaf Segers (29 December 1848 – 3 April 1930) was a Flemish writer, Dutch and German teacher and Vondel scholar.

== Biography ==
He graduated from the state normal school in Lier as a teacher. He received his first appointment in 1868 in the municipal education of Leuven. In 1873 a story by Segers was published in De Vlaamsche Kunstbode. In 1875 he became a teacher in Antwerp, and in 1879 he became a teacher of Dutch language and literature and of German language at the normal school in Lier. His debut Dorpsgeschiedenissen was also published that year. A second collection of short stories, In de Kempen followed in 1882. During his career Segers published several essays on Joost van den Vondel, the first in 1887. In total, he produced about thirty texts about this writer, his life and his work. His first novel, Twee beren, was published in 1890.

In addition to creative work (novels, novellas and short stories), he was also the author of essays on parenting, education and language teaching. Segers was a strong opponent of teaching a second language in primary education. He believed that at that age the study of a second language prevented a solid knowledge of the mother tongue.

He was invited on 11 July 1894 to become a corresponding member of the Royal Flemish Academy of Language and Literature as the successor of Karel Frans Idesbald de Flou, who became an ordinary member. On 17 December 1900, he became a full member, succeeding August de Maere, who died that year.

A street in Hoogstraten is named after him.
