= Gustavia (disambiguation) =

Gustavia is the main town and capital of the island of Saint Barthélemy.

Gustavia may also refer to

- Gustavia, Rügen, an unfinished town project in Swedish Pomerania
- Gustavia (plant), a genus of plants in the family Lecythidaceae
- Gustavia (arachnid), a genus of arachnids in the family Gustaviidae within the order Sarcoptiformes

People with the name include:

- Gustavia Lui, New Zealand businesswoman
