= Gustov C. Lerch House =

Historic house in Iowa, United States

- U.S. National Register of Historic Places
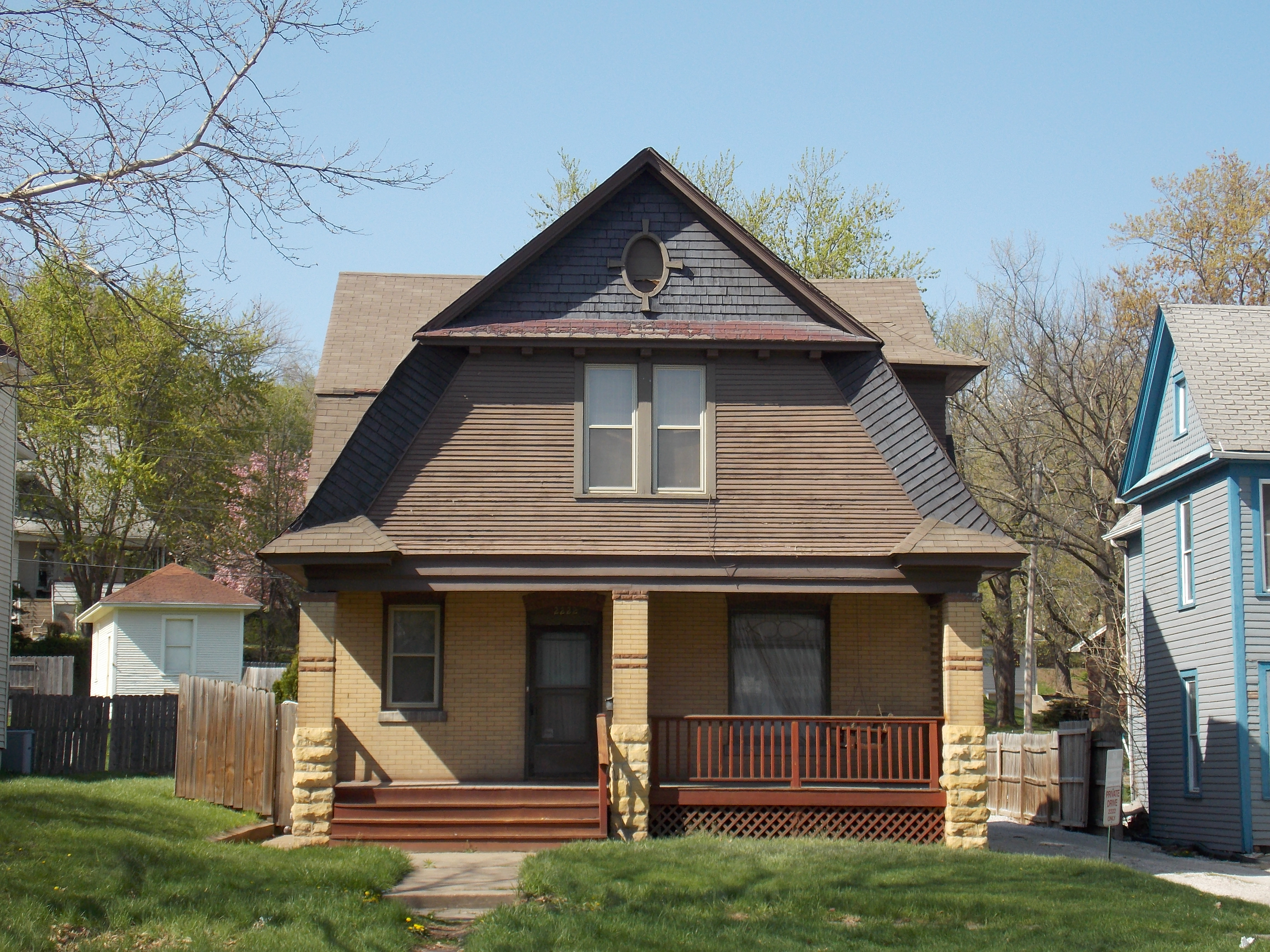

- Location within Iowa Location within the United States
- Location: 2222 W. 4th St. Davenport, Iowa
- Coordinates: 41°31′25″N 90°36′44″W
- Built: 1904-1905
- Architectural style: Shingle Style; Colonial Revival
- MPS: Davenport MRA
- NRHP reference No.: 83002463
- Added to NRHP: July 7, 1983

The Gustov C. Lerch House is a historic building located in the West End of Davenport, Iowa, United States. It has been listed on the National Register of Historic Places since 1983.

== History ==
Gustov Lerch was a clerk in the District Court. He later became a bookkeeper for a hardware dealer, the A.J. Lerch Company. Lerch and his wife Mamie built this house between 1904 and 1905.

== Architecture ==
The Gustov C. Lerch House was designed in a combination of the Shingle and Colonial Revival styles. The house is distinguished by its cross gambrels and the variety of surface textures that were employed in its construction. The foundation is composed of quarry-faced stone, the main level is composed of tan brick with segmented widow arches and corners in dark, rock-faced brick. The upper level is composed of gambrels that are covered in narrow clapboard. There is a pentroof across each gable on the attic level. An Adamesque oval window is located at the top of the main gable. There is an identical house in Davenport's Oak Lane Historic District.
