= Judith Benhamou-Huet =

French journalist and curator

Judith Benhamou
- Born: Judith Benhamou; France
- Occupations: Journalist, independent curator, author
- Writing career
- Language: French, English
- Genres: Art history, art

Judith Benhamou is an independent journalist, author and major cultural voice who has documented the international art world for more than three decades. A weekly columnist for Les Echos, she is also an independent curator and the author of several books, and regularly publishes articles related to art and the art market on her own blog Judith Benhamou Reports.. She explores the people, ideas and forces shaping contemporary culture through reporting, interviews and on-the-ground coverage. Known for her editorial independence and exceptional access, she offers a distinctive perspective on the artists, institutions and cultural leaders influencing today’s global art scene.

== Career ==
=== Writing ===
In the early 1990s, Benhamou began her career as a weekly columnist for the French daily Les Échos Benhamou collaborated with Interview Magazine, Vogue Paris, Neue Zürcher Zeitung, Art & Auction, Artinfo, ArtPress, Beaux-Arts and Connaissance des Arts. In the early 2000s she began her weekly column for the French Magazine Le Point. She is now also involved in Les Echos TV and BFM TV where she presents, on a weekly basis, her views on current art exhibitions of the French and international art scene.

Alongside to her journalistic achievements, Benhamou wrote several books. Among them are Art Business (2001) and Art Business (2) (2007), published in English with the title The Worth of Art and The Worth of Art (2). In these publications, Benhamou analyzes the principles of valuation in the contemporary art market. Thus far, the two volumes have been translated from French to English, Mandarin Chinese and Russian.

In 2008, Benhamou authored Global Collectors, written in both French and English and published by Phébus in which she profiled 120 international art collectors.

In 2012, Benhamou wrote Les Artistes ont Toujours Aimé L'Argent. D'Albrecht Durer à Damien Hirst, a study of notable artists throughout history and their – sometimes unexpected - relationship to money. The book was published by Grasset in France and by World Publishing Beijing in China.

In 2014, Benhamou authored a biographical account of the life of the artist, Robert Mapplethorpe, published in France by Grasset. Titled Dans la vie noire et blanche de Robert Mapplethorpe, the book was followed closely by Mapplethorpe, Vivant – Réponse à des Questions in which Benhamou presented a series of exclusive interviews of relatives, friends, curators and former boyfriends of Mapplethorpe, each relating singular details of the artist’s life and art. The book was published by Presses du Réel. Both works emanate from researches Benhamou did on the occasion of her curating and co-curating two shows on Mapplethorpe at the Musée Rodin and at the Grand Palais in Paris.

=== Curatorial Practice ===
As an independent curator, Benhamou curated an exhibition titled Warhol TV (2009) in which she explored Andy Warhol's connection to television and for which she also wrote the exhibition catalogue. Warhol TV toured in Paris at La Maison Rouge, the Berardo Museum in Lisbon, and in several other institutions in Brazil including Oi Futuro Flamengo in Rio de Janeiro, Oi Futoro in Belo Horizonte and Sesc Pinheiros in São Paulo.

In 2014, Benhamou co-curated the exhibition "Mapplethorpe-Rodin" at the Musée Rodin in Paris and was an associate-curator of the Robert Mapplethorpe retrospective at the Grand Palais.

Judith has curated an exhibition of the Chinese artist Ai Weiwei at the Mucem in Marseille. The exhibition Ai Weiwei Fan-Tan has opened in June 2018 and featured works by Ai Weiwei in dialogue with the museum's collection.

In 2022, Judith has co-curated the exhibition Serra/Seurat. Drawings at the Guggenheim Museum Bilbao. The exhibition brings together a selection of 22 drawings by the late 19th-century master Georges Seurat, which in turn engage in dialogue with the drawings of Richard Serra, a great admirer of Seurat’s.

== Publishing history ==
Releases by Judith Benhamou
Year	Title	Publisher	ISBN
2001	Art business : Le marché de l'art ou l'art du marché (in French and Chinese)	Assouline	978-2-84323-305-0
2001	The Worth of Art: Pricing the Priceless (in English)	Assouline	978-2-84323-284-8
2006	Femme Cuillière (in French)	Cinq Sens	978-2-95262-390-2
2008	Art Business (2) (in French and Russian)	Assouline	978-2-7594-0146-8
2008	The Worth of Art (2) (in English)	Assouline	978-2-7594-0147-5
2008	Global Collectors (in English and French)	Phoebus / Senses	978-2-7529-0328-0
2009	21st-Century Embroidery in India: In Their Hands (in English)	Prestel Publishing	978-3-7913-4229-0
2010	Les œuvres d'Art les plus chères du monde (in French)	Éditions du Chêne	978-2-8123-0263-3
2012	Les artistes ont toujours aimé l'argent (in French)	Grasset	978-2-2467-6981-1
2014	Mapplethorpe, vivant - réponse à des questions (in French)	Les Presses du réel	978-2-84066-655-4
2014	Dans la vie noire et blanche de Robert Mapplethorpe (in French)	Grasset	978-2-24680-506-9
2015	Les artistes ont toujours aimé l'argent (in Chinese)	World Publishing Beijing	978-7-5100-8806-3
2017	Aleijadinho – Le Brésil est un sculpteur métisse (in French)	Les Presses du réel	978-2-84066-751-3
2018	Ai Weiwei Fan-Tan	Manuella	978-2-91721-799-3
2022	Serra/Seurat. Drawings	Guggenheim Bilbao	978-84-18895-60-9
2023	Histoires extraordinaires de l'art à l'hôtel Drouot - De Vermeer à Louise Bourgeois (in French)	Flammarion	978-2-08-042808-0
