= Jan Huet =

Belgian stained glass painter

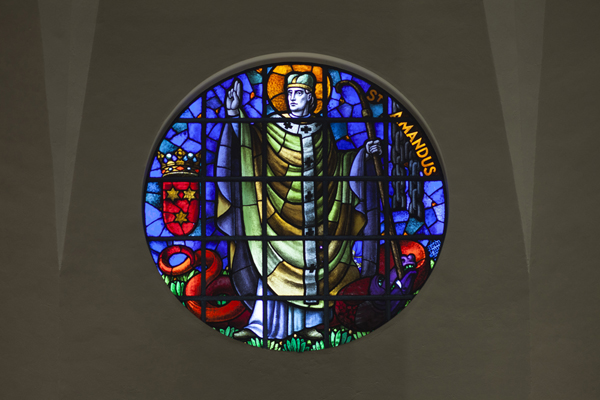
Stained glass window in the Sint-Amanduskerk (Zwevegem)

Jan Huet (19 May 1903 – 2 April 1976) was a Belgian stained glass painter.

Huet studied Greek and Latin at the Minor Seminary in Hoogstraten and then went to the Higher Institute of Art Crafts in Ixelles and the Sint-Lucas School and the Higher Institute in Sint-Gillis Brussels. He was a pupil of Jan Willemen. After his education he went to Denmark to realize some works there. In 1947 he became a professor at the Royal Academy of Fine Arts of Antwerp.

His cousin Raph Huet was also a glass painter.
