= Royal Academy of Fine Arts, Brussels =

Art school established in Brussels, Belgium, in 1711

Royal Academy of Fine Arts of Brussels
- Académie royale des Beaux-Arts de Bruxelles (French); Koninklijke Academie voor Schone Kunsten van Brussel (Dutch)
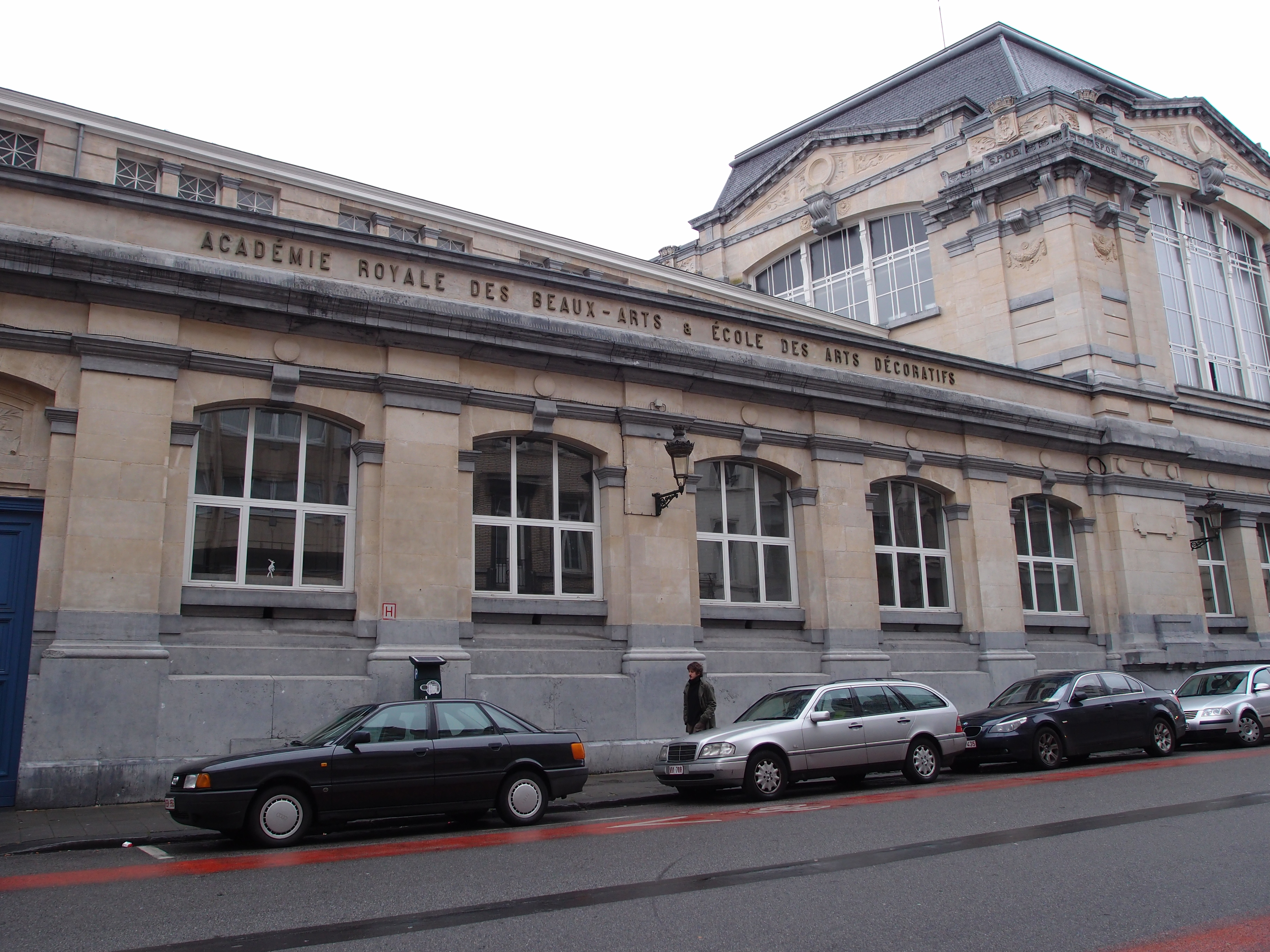
- Façade of the Royal Academy of Fine Arts, Rue du Midi/Zuidstraat, Brussels
- Type: Art school
- Established: 1711 (315 years ago)
- Location: Brussels, Belgium; 50.8440°N 4.3477°E
- Website: arba-esa.be/en

The Royal Academy of Fine Arts of Brussels (French: Académie royale des Beaux-Arts de Bruxelles [akademi ʁwajal de boz‿aʁ də bʁysɛl], ArBA-EsA; Dutch: Koninklijke Academie voor Schone Kunsten van Brussel [ˈkoːnɪŋkləkə ˌaːkaːˈdeːmi voːr ˈsxoːnə ˈkʏnstə(ɱ) vɑm ˈbrʏsəl]) is an art school in Brussels, Belgium, founded in 1711. Starting from modest beginnings in a single room in Brussels' Town Hall, it has since 1876 been operating from a former convent and orphanage in the Rue du Midi/Zuidstraat, which was converted by the architect Victor Jamaer. The school has played an important role in training leading local artists.

== History ==
=== Origins ===
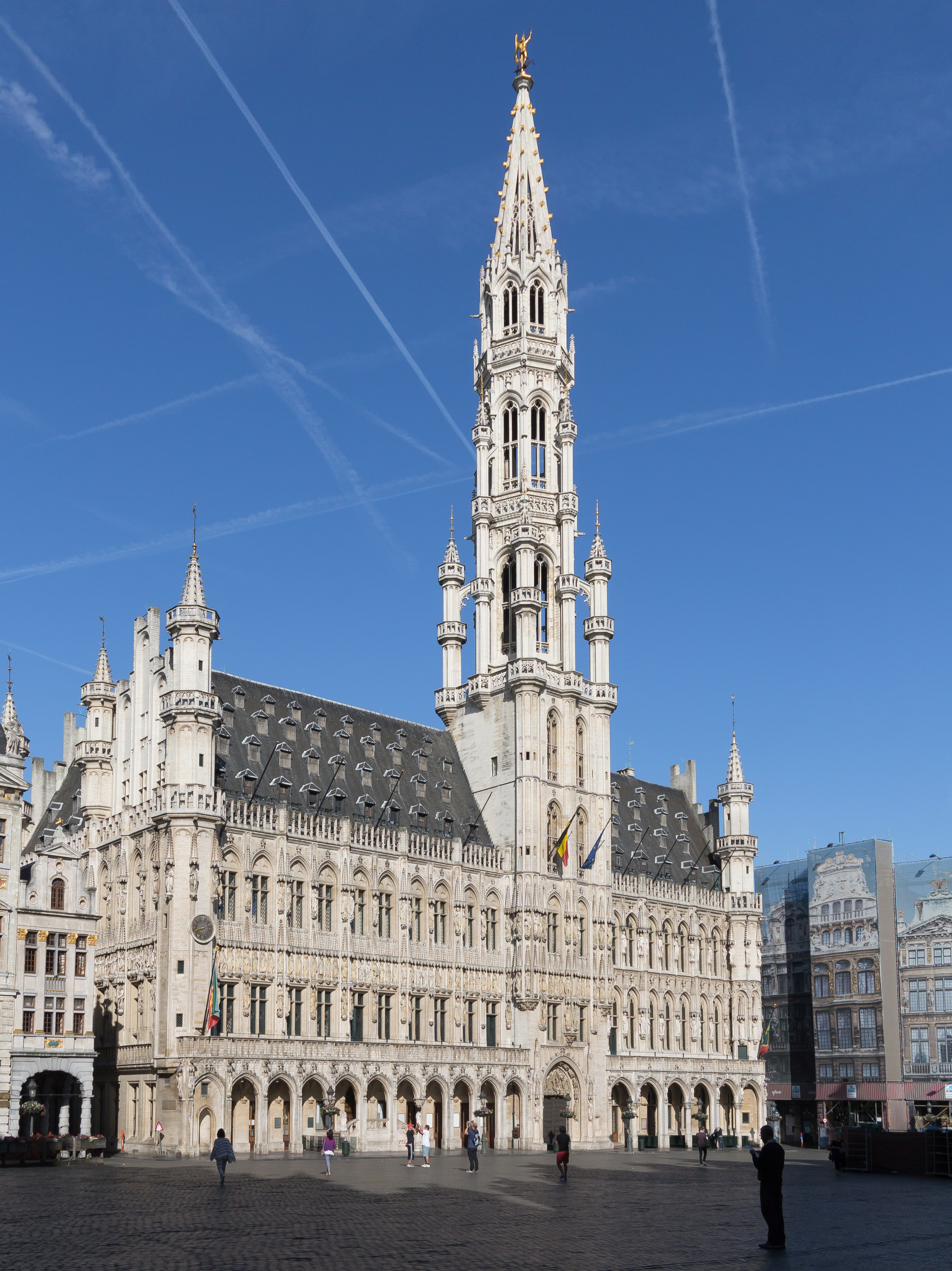
Brussels' Town Hall, where the Academy draws its origins

Historically, artistic training in Brussels was organised in traditional workshops, where masters would teach their skills to apprentices. The masters needed to be registered with their local guild to be able to practice their craft. On 30 September 1711, the magistrate of the City of Brussels granted the guilds of painters, sculptors, weavers, as well as other amateurs, the use of a room in the Town Hall to teach drawing classes to their pupils. On 16 October of the same year, some sort of school was established at these premises to organise the classes. This school would concentrate mainly on teaching drawing. (Note: The principle of master and apprentice was left. This new school-system ultimately led to a loss of the specialised knowledge accumulated in the past by the respective guilds.)

In 1737, the school adopted its first rules. The city assumed some costs, including those for the models. A few decades later, however, disagreement broke out. The classes moved to the 't Gulden Hoofd inn and were even suspended for a while. The Bruges painter Bernard Verschoot took over the school's leadership and tried to put it back on the rails with a heavy hand. The Governor of the Habsburg Netherlands, Prince Charles Alexander of Lorraine, put the school under his high protection in 1762. His attention went mainly to the Department of Architecture. The school was re-established in 1768 as the Académie de Peinture, Sculpture et Architecture ("Academy of Painting, Sculpture and Architecture"), with funds raised through a public subscription. Inspiration was found in the French model. A year later, the school returned to the Town Hall. In 1795, the Academy was closed following the conquest of Brussels by French revolutionary troops.

=== Resurgence under François-Joseph Navez ===
In 1829, the Academy moved into the Granvelle Palace (since demolished). The following year, François-Joseph Navez became director. He organised the school and expanded it. In 1832, the Academy relocated to the basement of the left wing of the Palace of Industry. From 1835 to 1836, Navez's plans were implemented. In 1836, the Academy was awarded the privilege of using the adjective "Royal" as part of its name. Panel painting was declared to another important department; it was based on the first golden age of Dutch painting. However, there were tensions at the Academy for some time regarding the yet propagated neoclassical style. In addition to painting and sculpture, architectural education became increasingly important, though it never achieved the status of a pioneering teaching and training facility. (Note: In 1842, the Palladio Society was founded. It emerged from the class of the then-professor Tilman-François Suys. Its aim was to promote students in their learning path. Later, it began advising architects on all professional matters. Since 1936, the Palladian society's aims and objectives have been represented by the SADBr, which should be considered its successor organisation.)

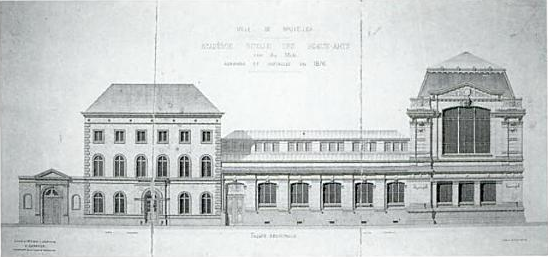
Drawing of the Academy's plan (Jamaer, 1876)

In 1876, the Academy moved to the school buildings on the Rue du Midi/Zuidstraat, in what was the former Bogards' convent, which had meanwhile served as an orphanage. The architect Victor Jamaer managed to incorporate the entire school within the limited space of the existing ensemble. On that occasion, the façade was redesigned in the neoclassical style. The Academy remains there to this day. From 5 January 1889, women were also allowed to participate in a class for advanced students. (Note: At this point, Europe moved away from the social perspective that women were assigned to amateurism. With this opening, they gained the right to be recognised as full-fledged artists. The term can be seen in the sense of Friedrich Schiller and Johann Wolfgang von Goethe.) At the end of the 19th century, the modern LUCA Campus Sint-Lukas Brussels was founded, a strong competition. Under the direction of Charles van der Stappen, the Academy gained even greater prestige. The training offer at that time even included literature and photography.

In the European art scene around the turn of the 20th century, Brussels drew forth as a training centre in the shadow of Paris. (Note: The Salon in Paris had reached its zenith at the time and thus lost its leading role.) Since 1889, Brussels had been the uncrowned capital of Art Nouveau, especially in architecture, which had its triumphal procession through Prof. Victor Horta. (Note: In architecture, the flow of eclecticism must not be ignored, which is a combination of neoclassicism and Art Nouveau. In Brussels, the façades of new buildings adopted this architectural design, too. Even abroad, this style has been taken by architects and builders as a model for their projects. Among the most influential architects in Belgium were Paul Picquet, Jean Baes, Fernand Conrad, Henri Beyaert and Paul Hankar.) The Academy managed the step to another centre of the avant-garde in panel painting. The Academy and its students went on to influence the development of Realism, Symbolism, Impressionism, Neo-Impressionism, Post-Impressionism and the newly incipient Expressionism. These were all precursors of modern art.

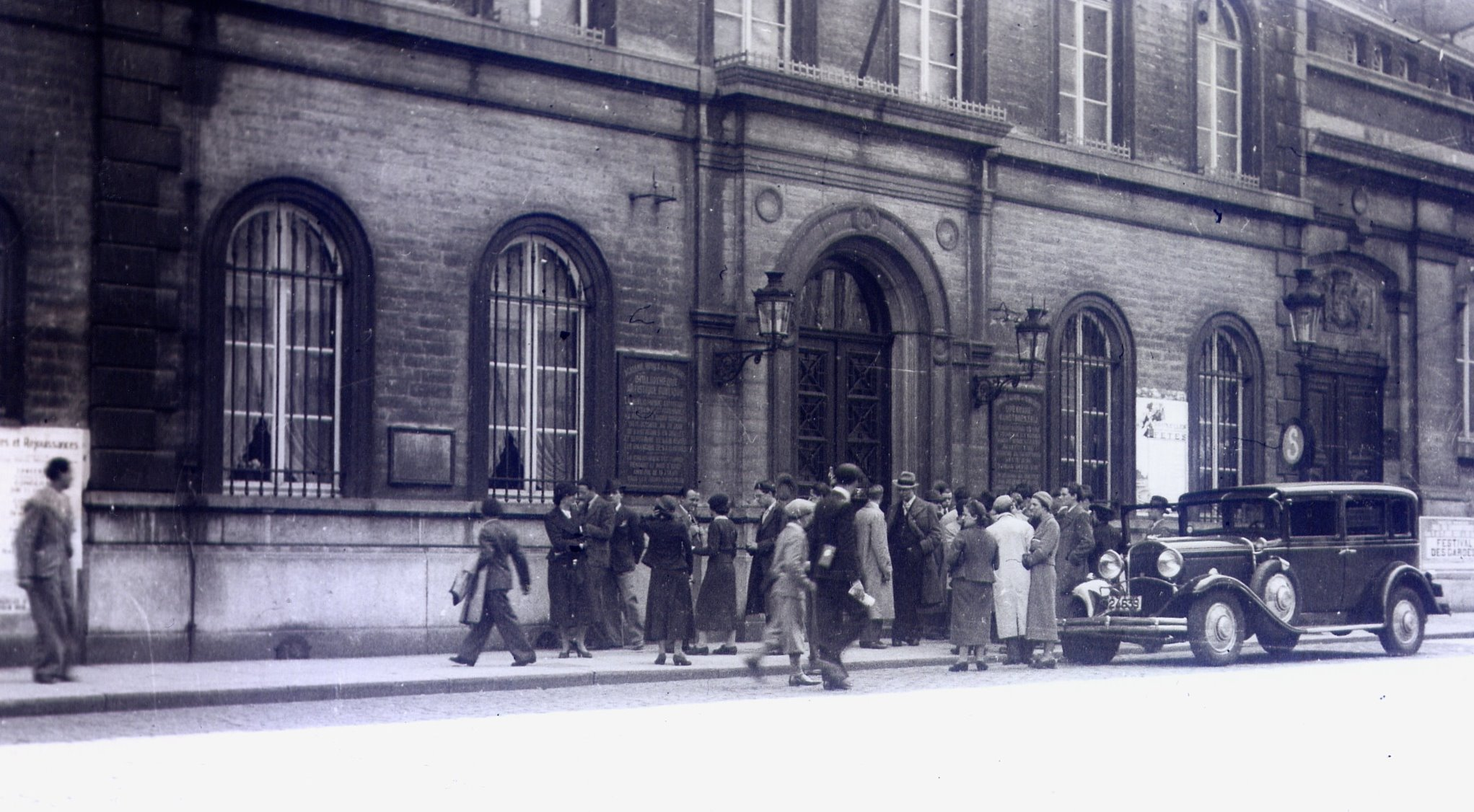
The Academy's entrance on the Rue du Midi in 1935 (photo by Léon van Dievoet)

In 1912, Horta had made changes to the organisation of the school. A system of studios was created, as it was recommended by Paul Bonduelle and Émile Lambot. (Note: Since 1954, the Paul Bonduelle Prix in architecture of the Royal Academy of Fine Arts of Brussels is awarded.) (Note: Émile Lambot was one of the key architects of the Belgian Art Nouveau style.) In 1936, the Royal Order was made to the formation of the separate Department of Architecture.

=== Changes in organisation and teaching after 1945 ===
In 1949, a small Department of Planning and Urban Development was established. Architectural studies got the rank of university education. In 1972, the Department of Artistic Humanities was established. In 1977, the Department of Architecture finally acquired its autonomy. Also in 1977, the Institut supérieur d'architecture Victor Horta, named after the Art Nouveau architect and former director, was founded. In 1980, higher second-degree education and new courses were introduced. In 2009, the Faculty of Architecture of the Université libre de Bruxelles (ULB) was founded. This followed the merger of two architectural schools: the Institut supérieur d'architecture Victor Horta (ISAVH) and the Institut supérieur d'architecture de la Communauté française La Cambre (ISACF).

Nowadays, ARBA is one of the sixteen art schools of the French Community of Belgium. Programmes are offered for Bachelor of Arts and Master of Arts in the fields of design, art and media, as well as doctoral studies. The Academy has been an ESA (Ecole Supérieure des Arts - Art College) with a university orientation. In addition, it is part of the Royal Academies for Science and the Arts of Belgium (RASAB), founded in 2001. The school is sometimes confused with the Royal Academies for Science and the Arts of Belgium (RASAB) and the Royal Academy of Science, Letters and Fine Arts of Belgium, both separate institutions, as well as the French Académie des Beaux-Arts in Paris, part of the Institut de France.

== Faculty and alumni ==
Includes some of the most famous names in Belgian painting, sculpture, and architecture:

- James Ensor (1860–1949), painter and printmaker
- Paul Delvaux (1897–1994), surrealist painter
- René Magritte (1898–1967), surrealist painter
- Kali (1918–1998), Polish-American painter
- Peyo (1928–1992), cartoonist, creator of The Smurfs
- Oriane Lassus (b. 1987), French author, cartoonist and illustrator

== Notable directors and professors ==
- Barnabé Guimard (1731–1805), French architect
- Tilman-François Suys (1783–1861), architect
- François-Joseph Navez (1787–1869), neoclassical painter
- Louis Gallait (1810–1887), painter
- Eugène Simonis (1810–1893), sculptor
- Jean-François Portaels (1818–1895), painter
- Charles van der Stappen (1843–1910), sculptor
- Jef Lambeaux (1852–1908), sculptor
- Jacques de Lalaing (1858–1917), Belgian-British sculptor and painter
- Victor Horta (1861–1947), architect
- Paul Saintenoy (1862–1952), architect, teacher, architectural historian, and writer
- Henri van Dievoet (1869–1931), architect
- Alfred Bastien (1873–1955), artist, academic, and soldier
- Léon Devos (1897–1974), painter

== Gallery of works by notable teachers and directors ==
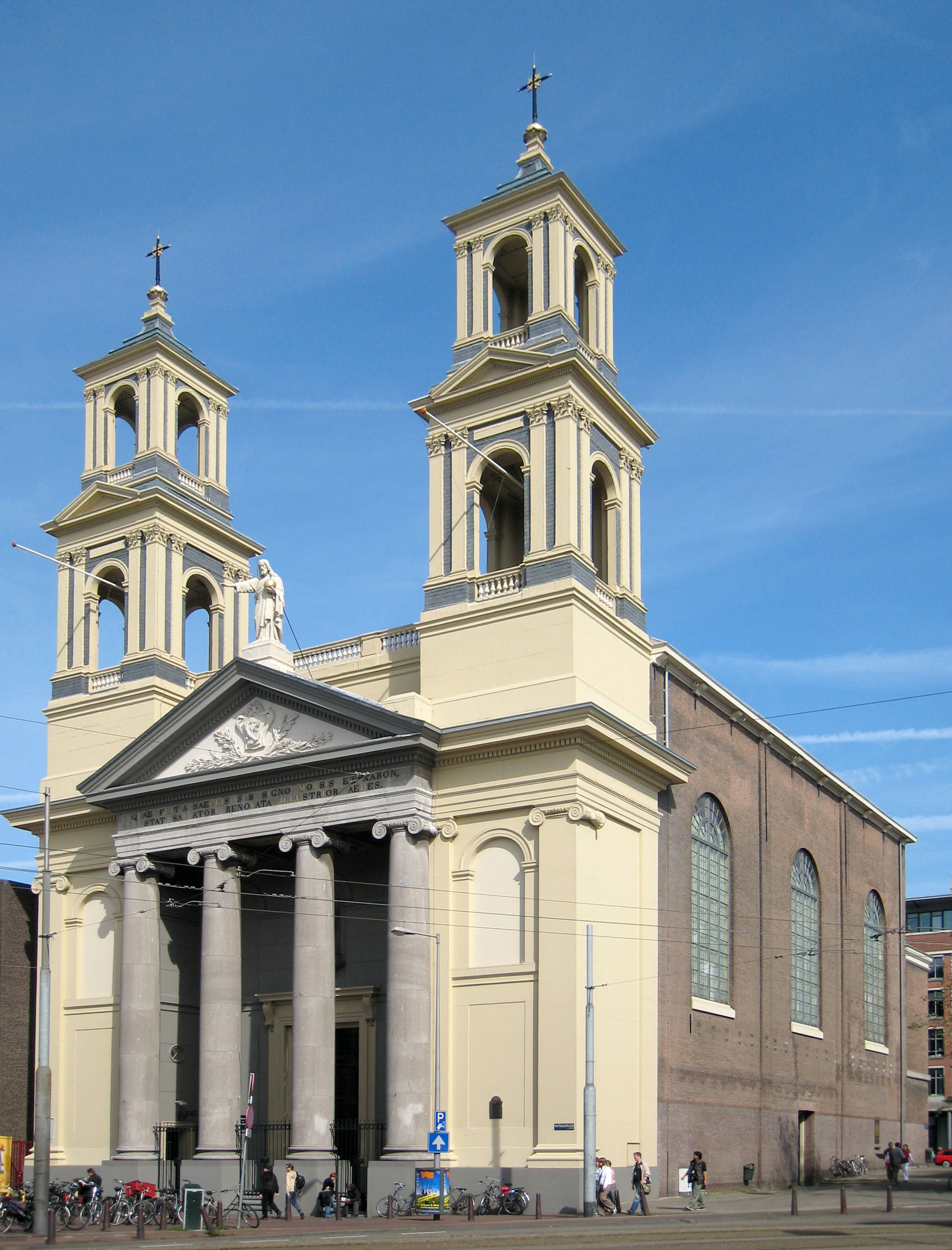
Tilman-François Suys (date unknown): St. Antonius Church, Amsterdam

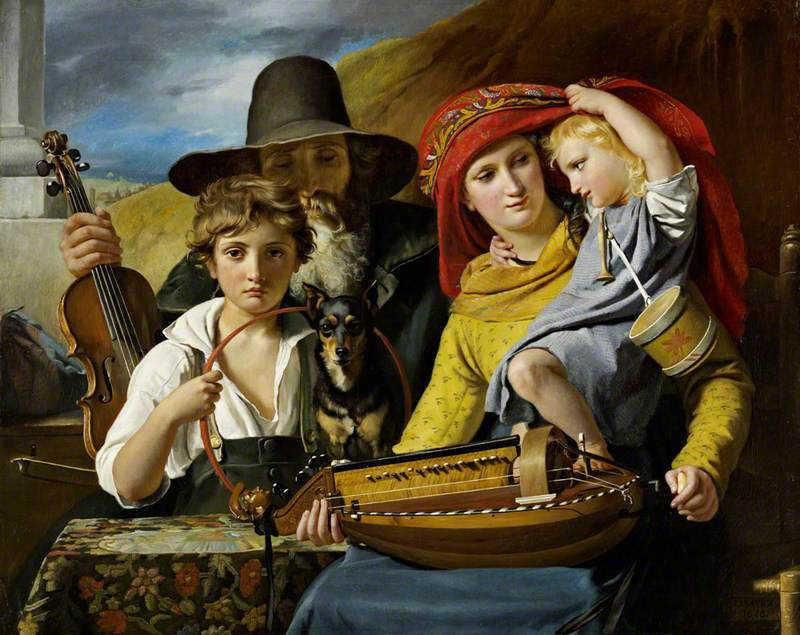
François Joseph Navez (1828): Travelling Musicians, National Galleries of Scotland

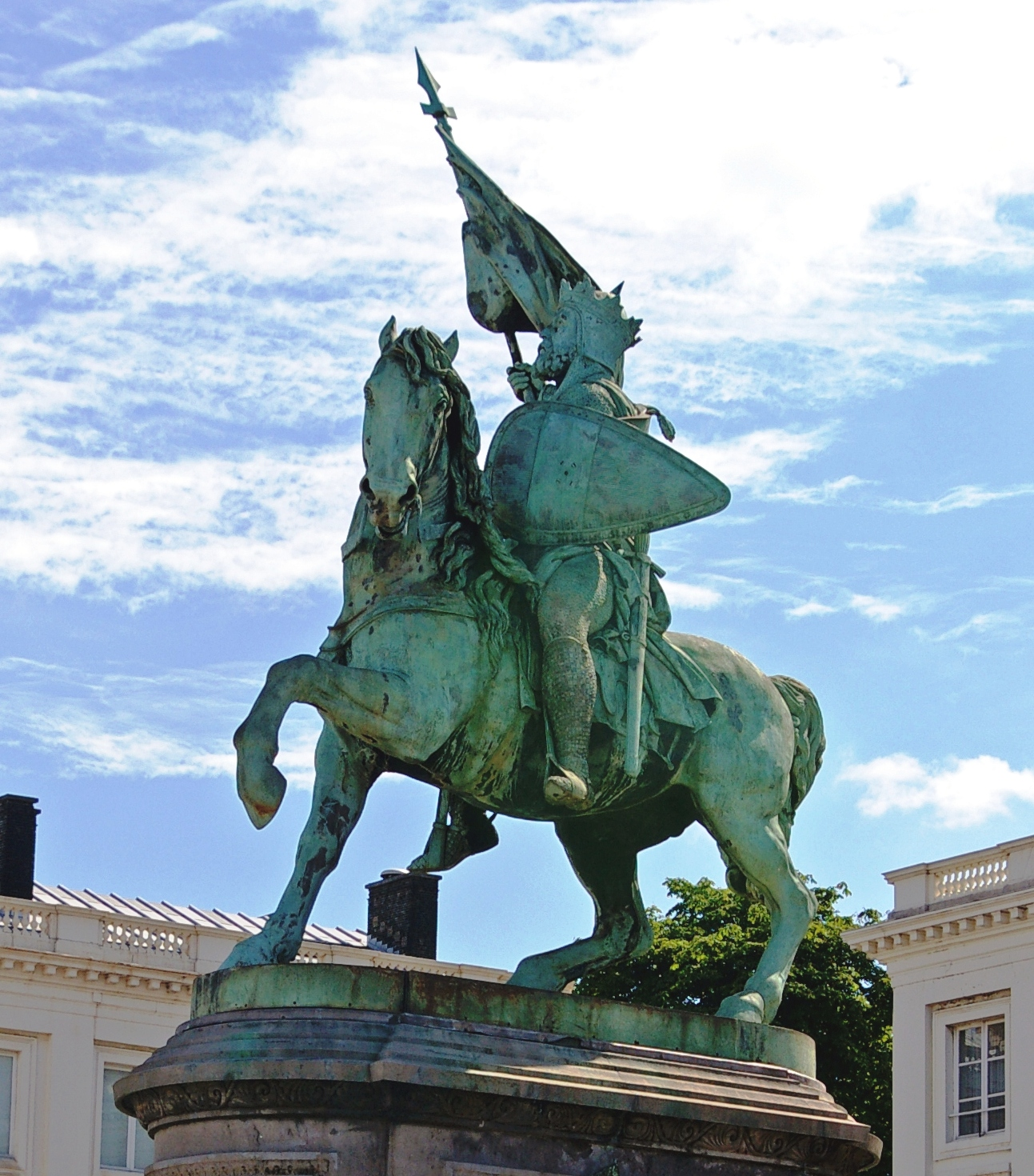
Eugène Simonis (1848): Equestrian statue of Godfrey of Bouillon, Place Royale/Koningsplein, Brussels

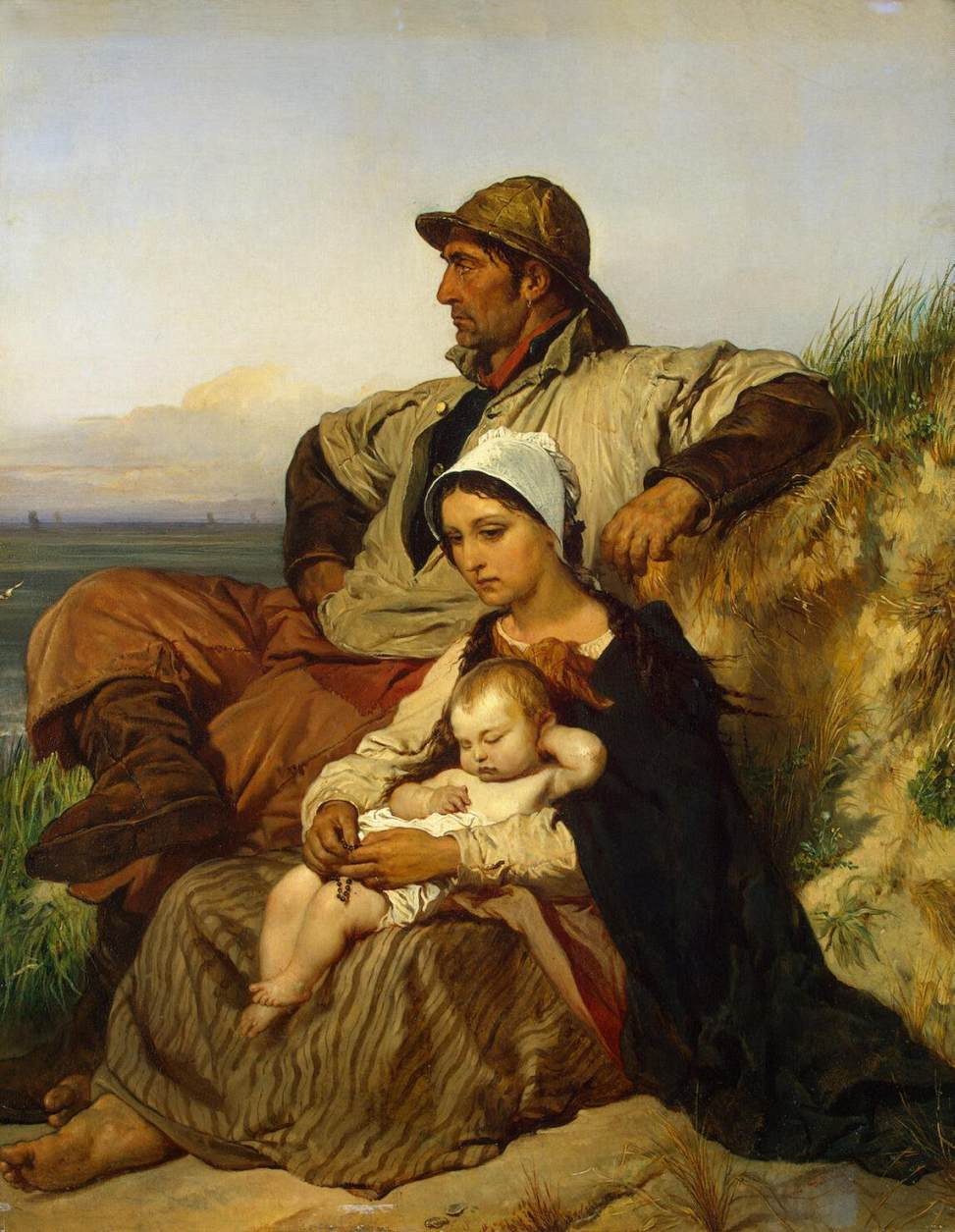
Louis Gallait (1848): The family of the fisherman, Hermitage Museum, St. Petersburg

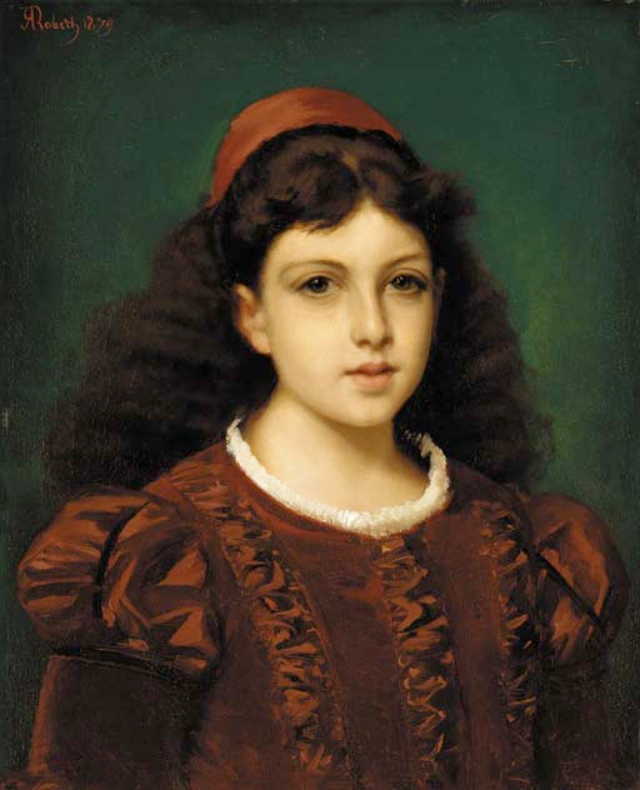
Alexandre Robert (date unknown), Young page, Private collection

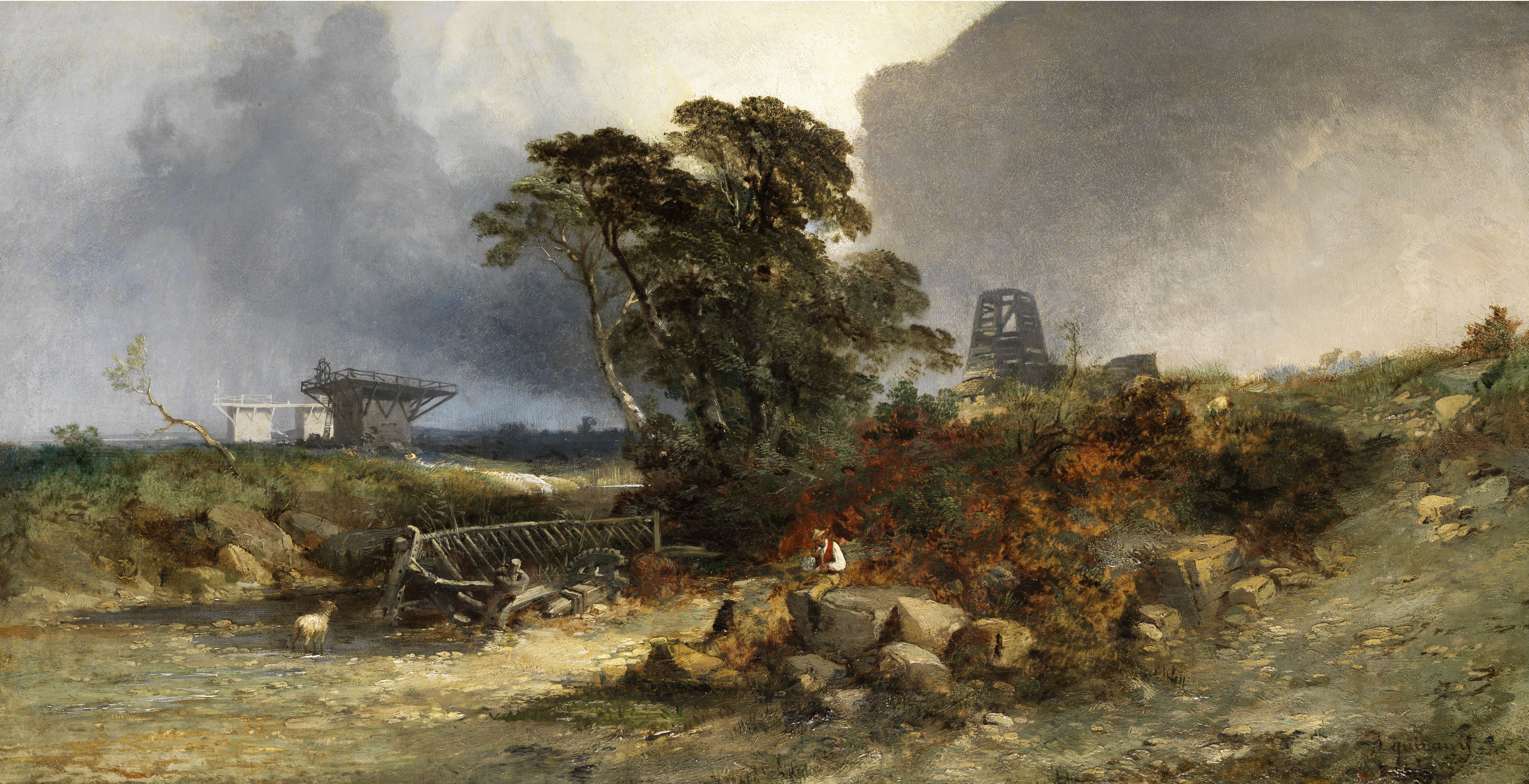
Joseph Quinaux (date unknown): The rest, Private collection

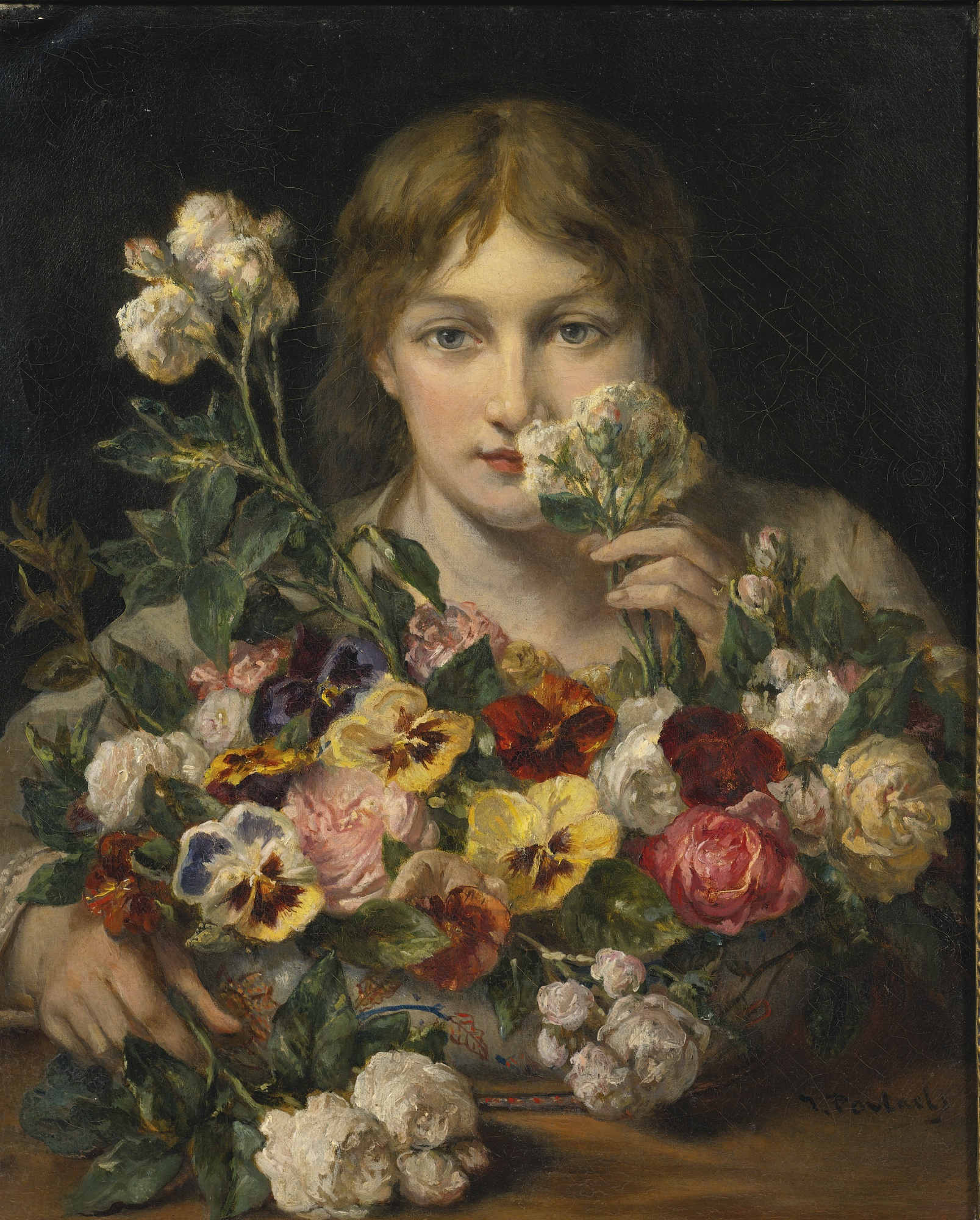
Jean-François Portaels (date unknown): Sweet flowers, Private collection

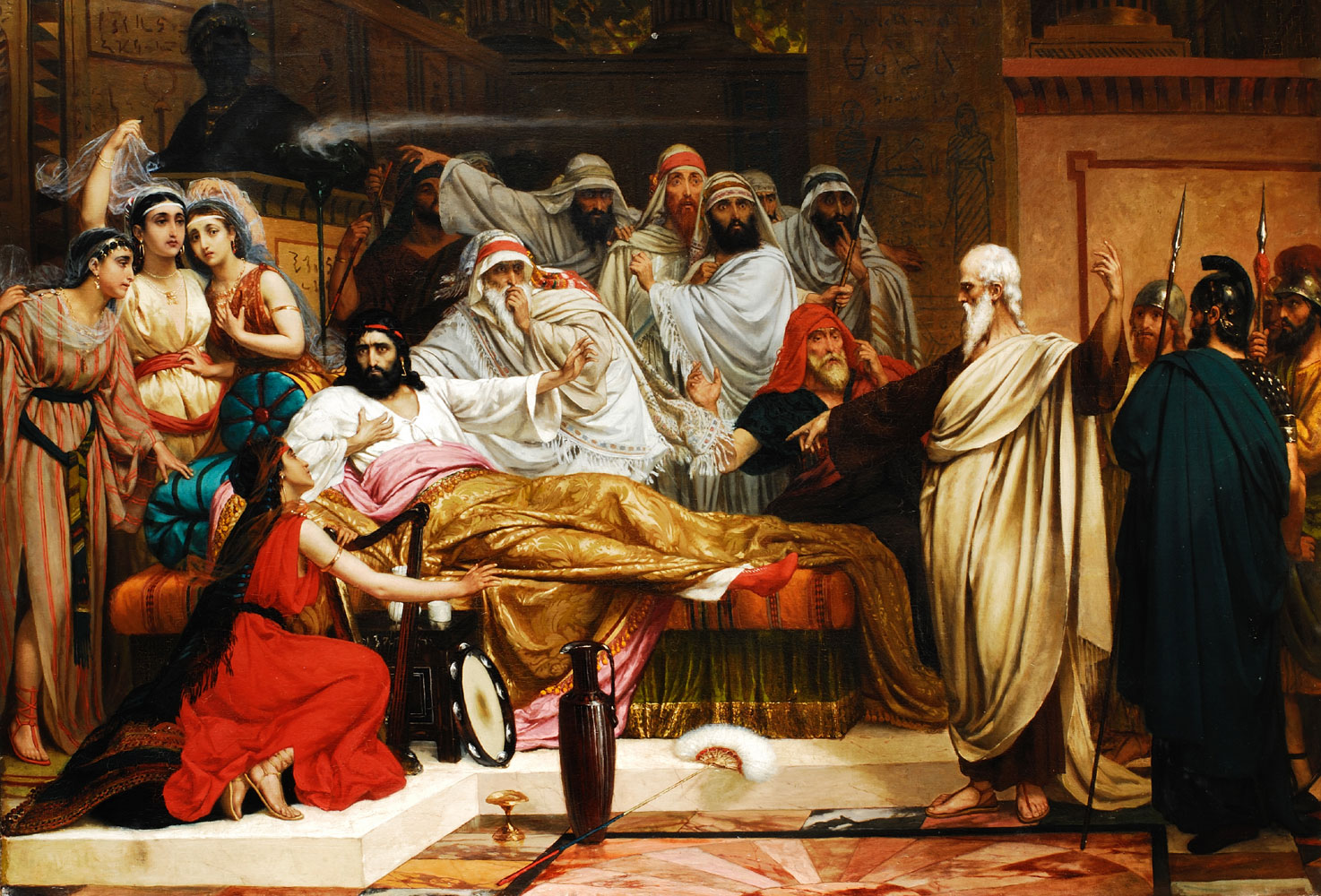
Joseph Stallaert (date unknown): The prophet Jeremiah prophesies the fall of Jerusalem, Private collection

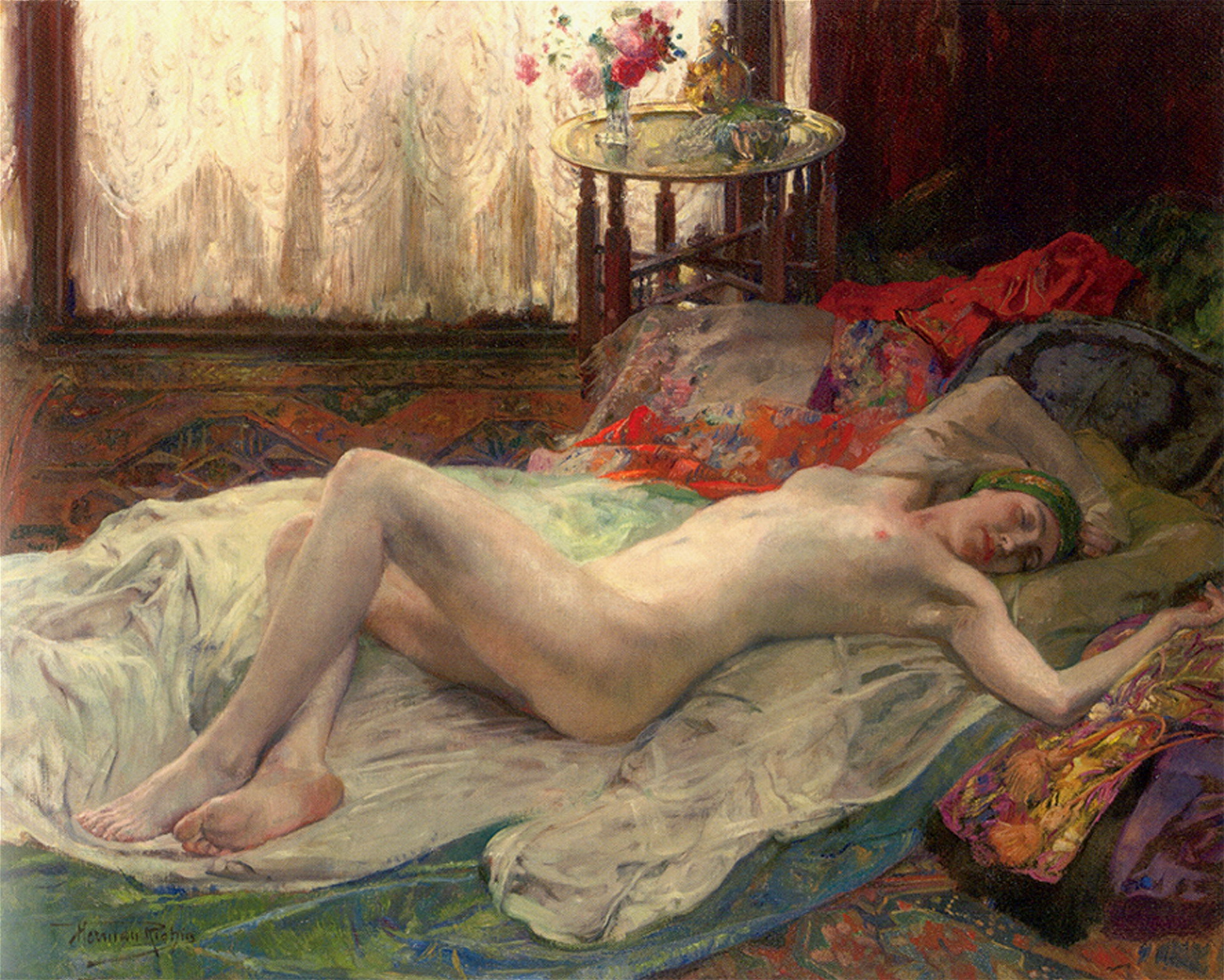
Herman Richir (date unknown): The sleep of Jamilé, Private collection

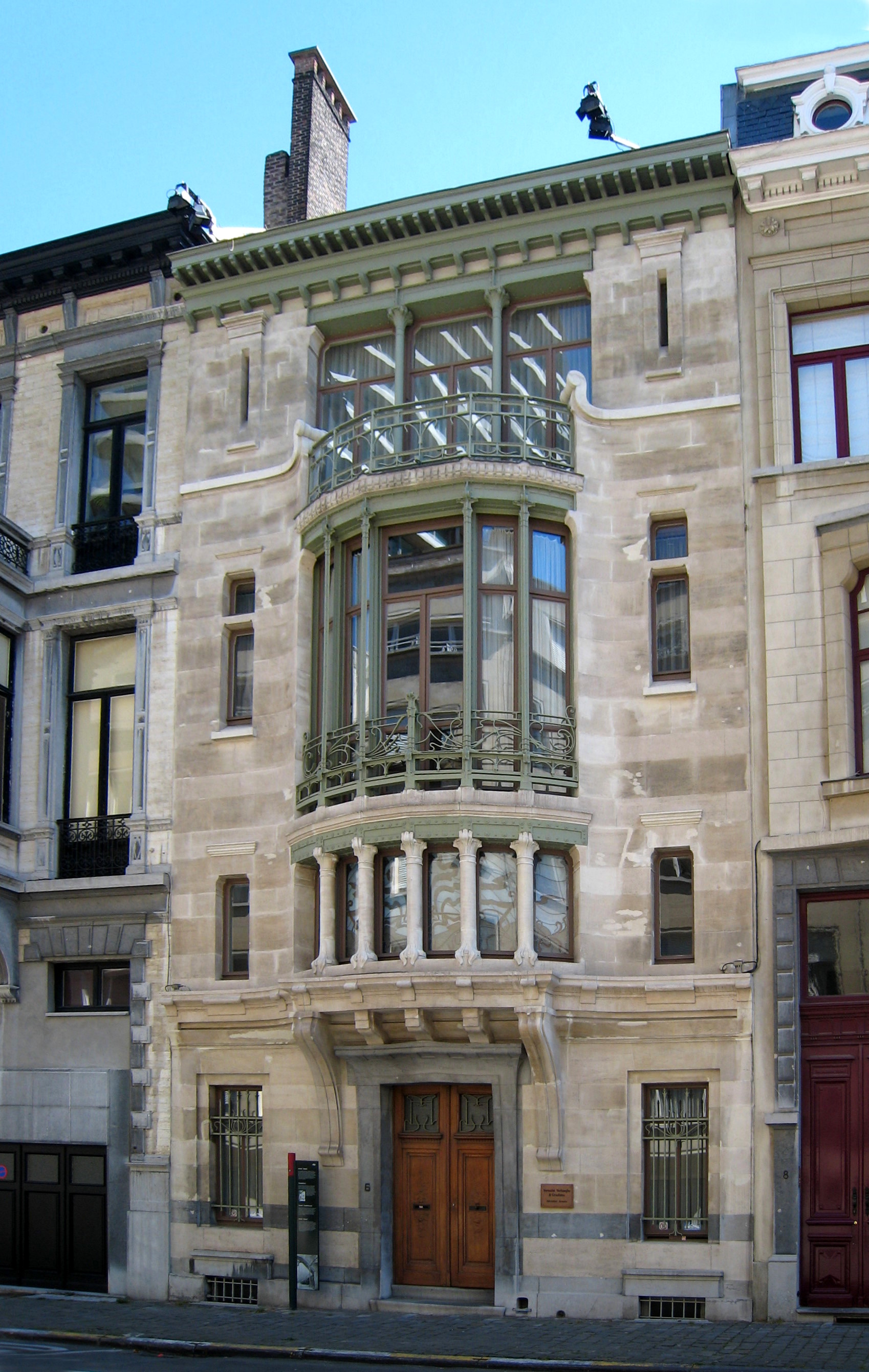
Victor Horta (1892/93): Hôtel Tassel, Brussels

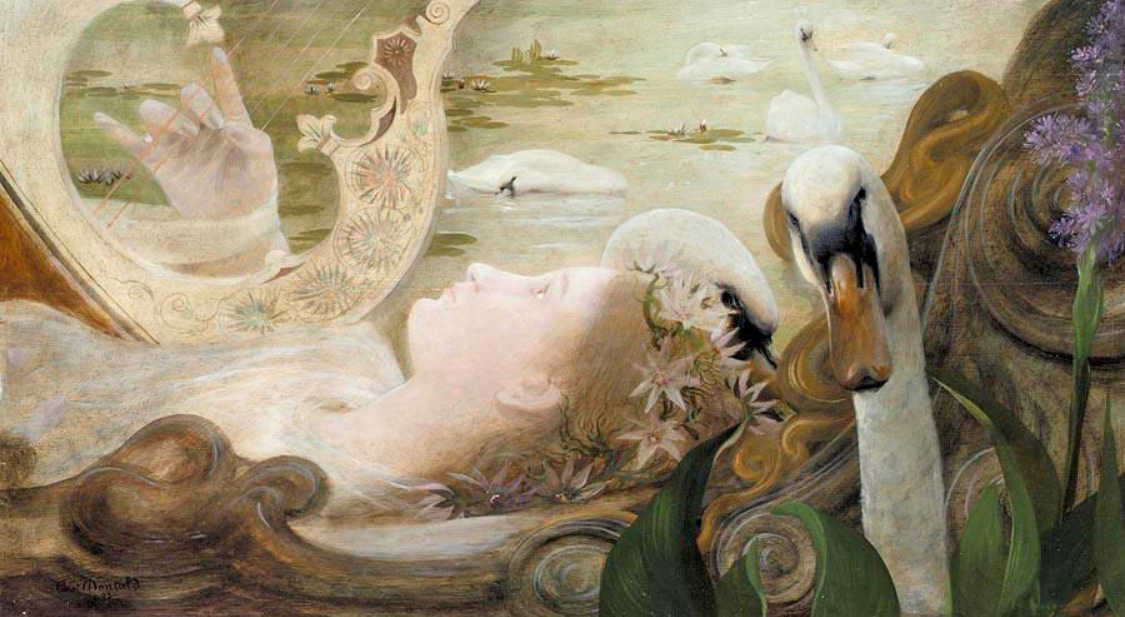
Constant Montald (1893): Ophelia, Private collection

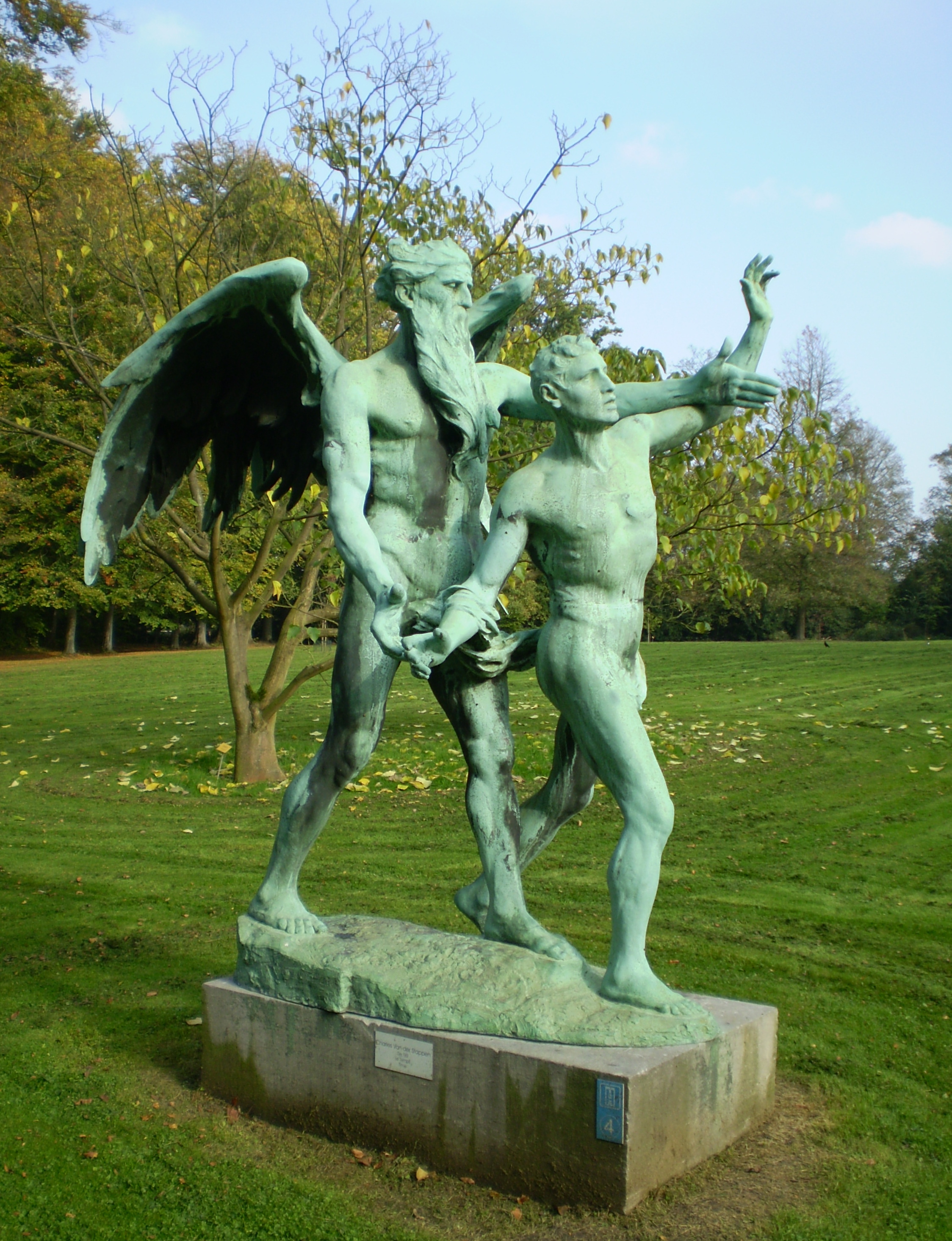
Charles Van der Stappen (1894/98): Time, Meise Botanic Garden

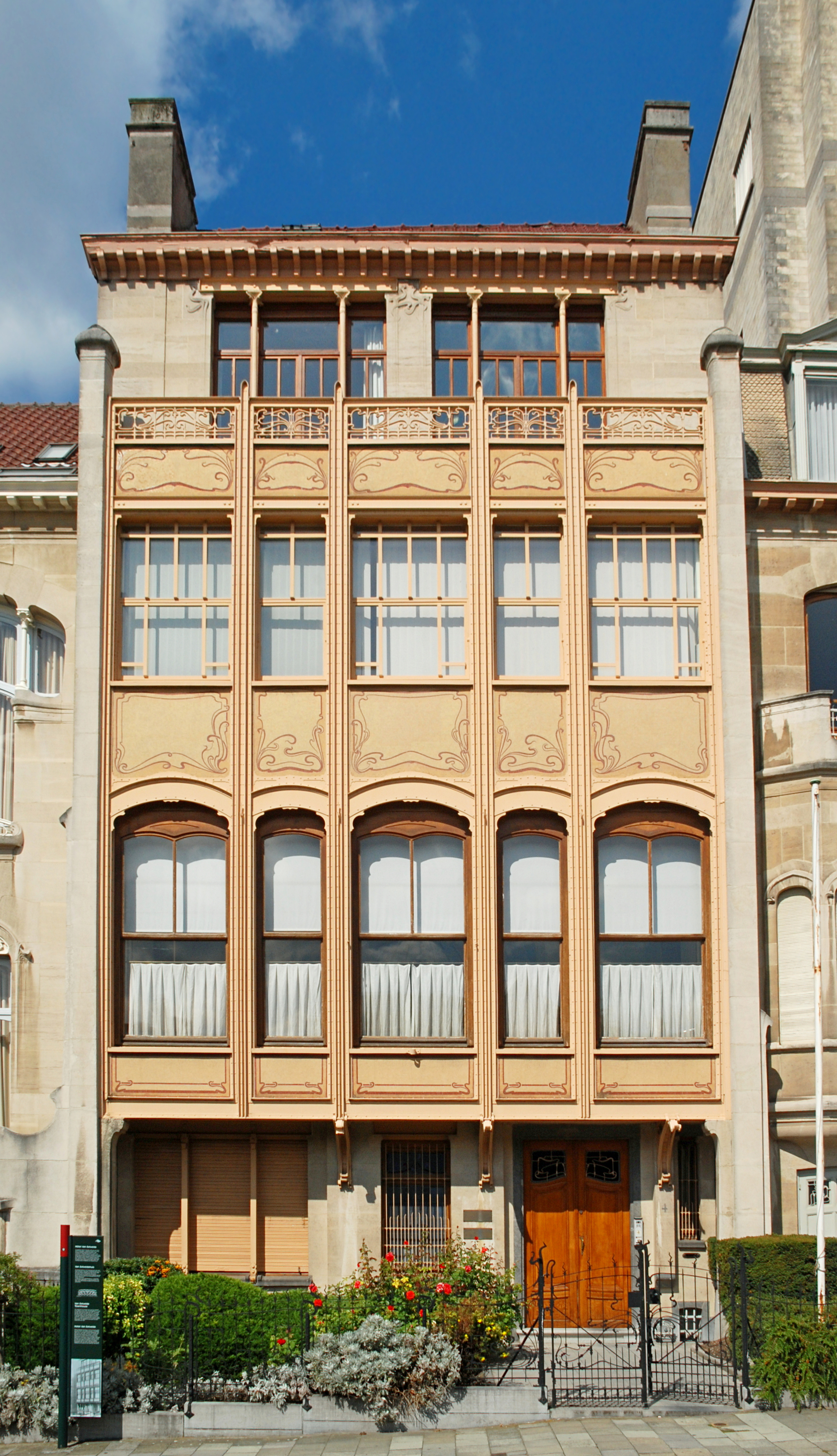
Victor Horta (1898/1900): Hôtel van Eetvelde, Brussels

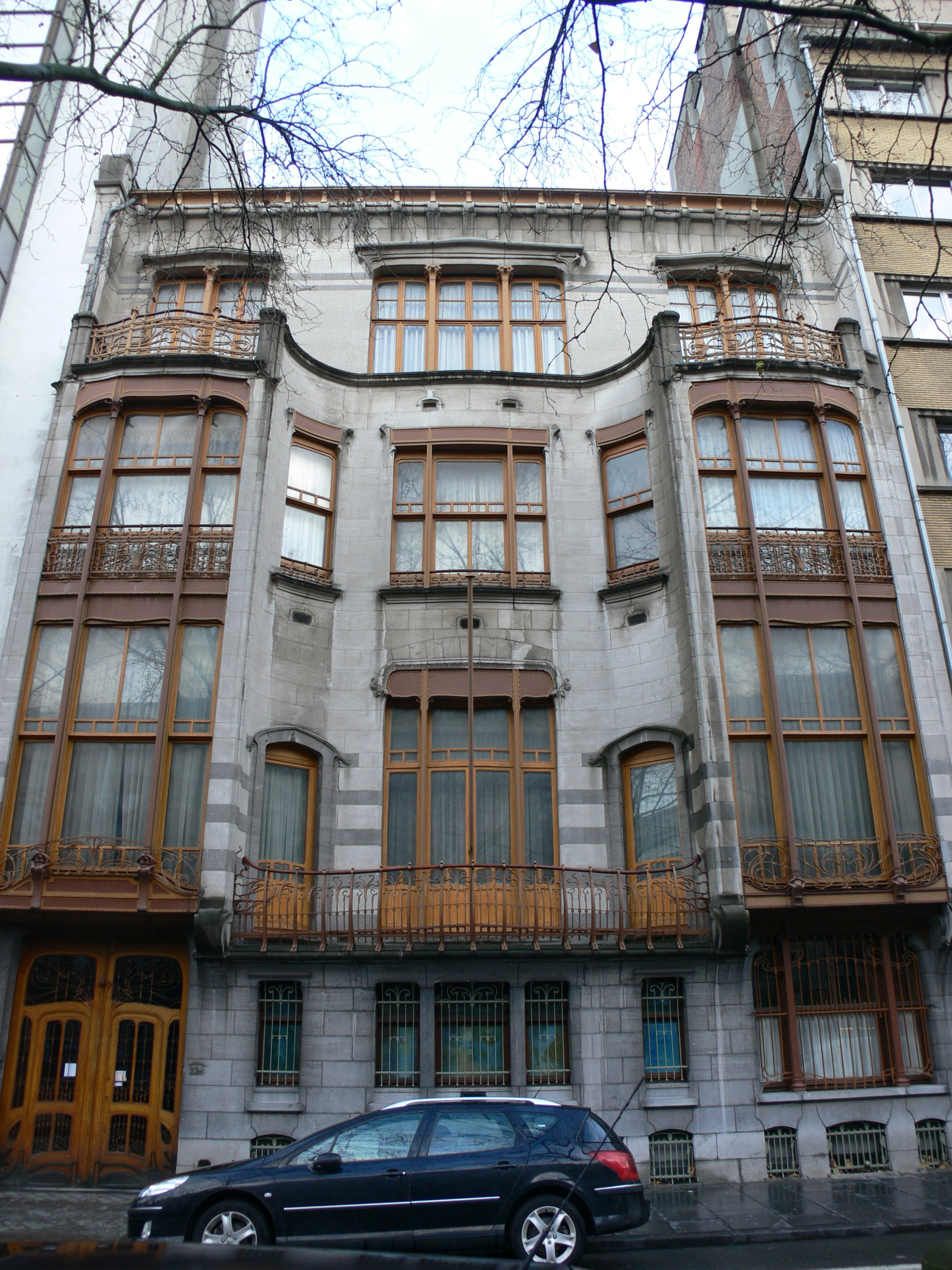
Victor Horta (1898/1900): Hôtel Solvay, Avenue Louise/Louizalaan 81, Brussels

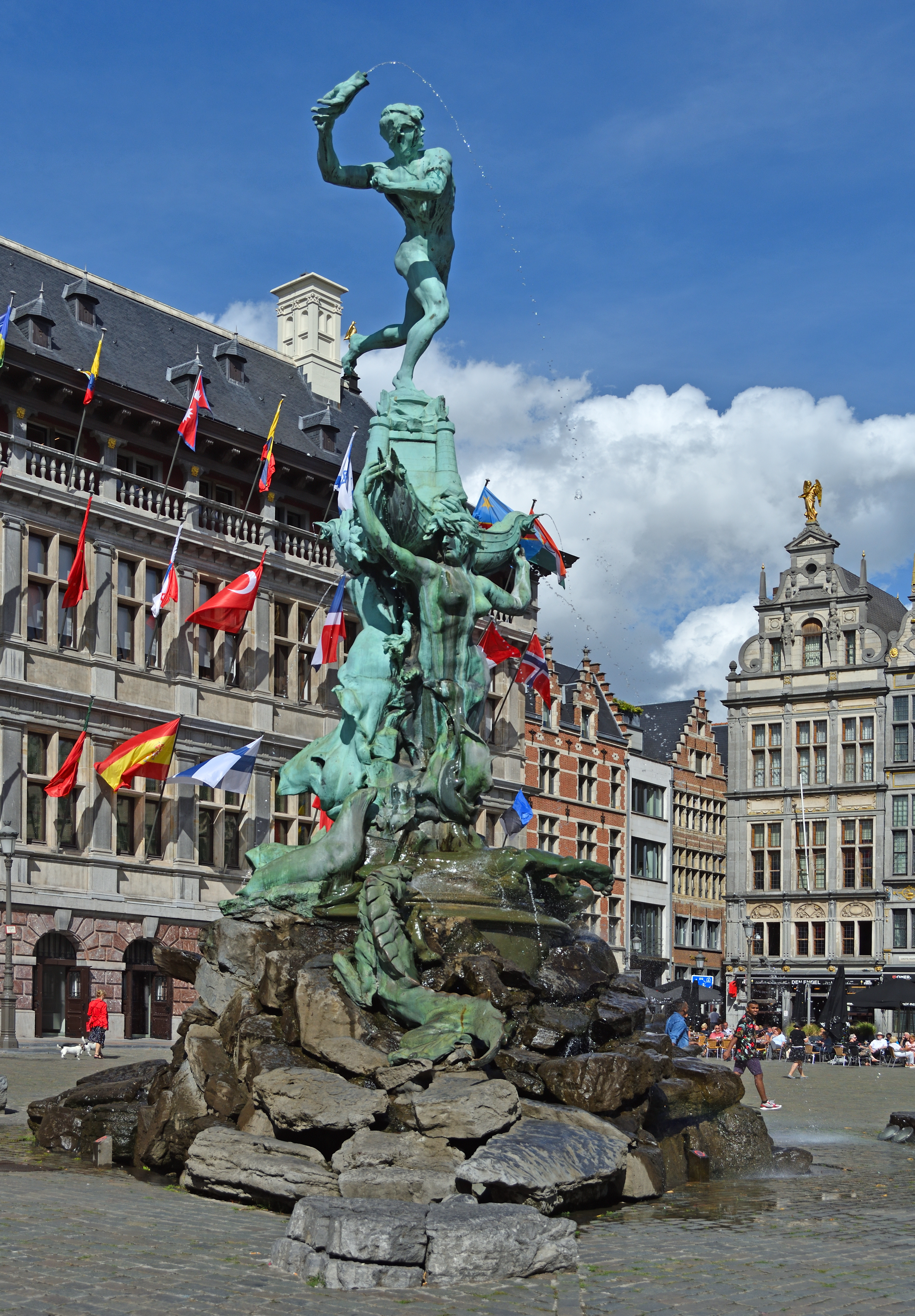
Jef Lambeaux (date unknown): Brabo Fountain, Antwerp

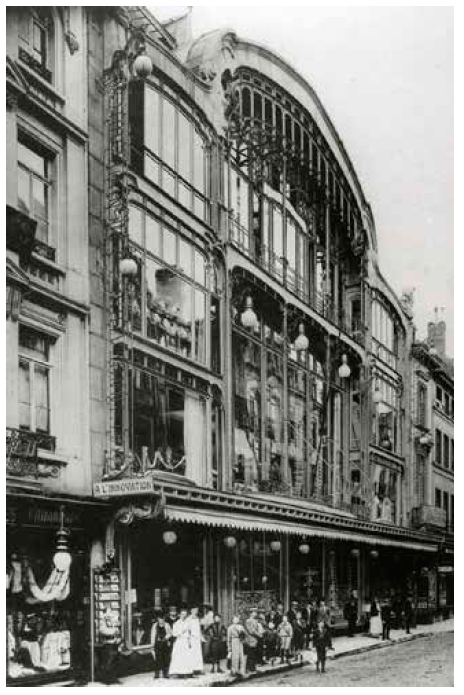
Victor Horta (1901): À L'Innovation department store, Rue Neuve/Nieuwstraat, Brussels

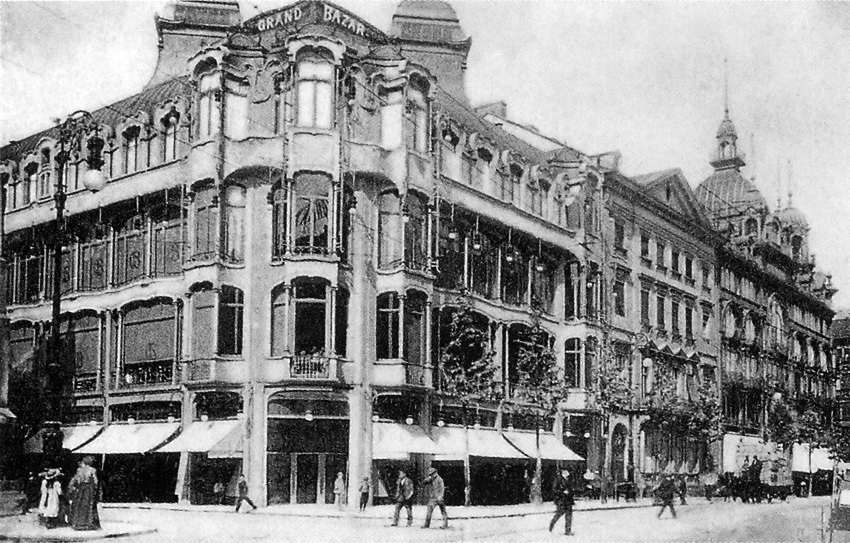
Victor Horta (1903/05): Le Grand Bazar department store, Frankfurt

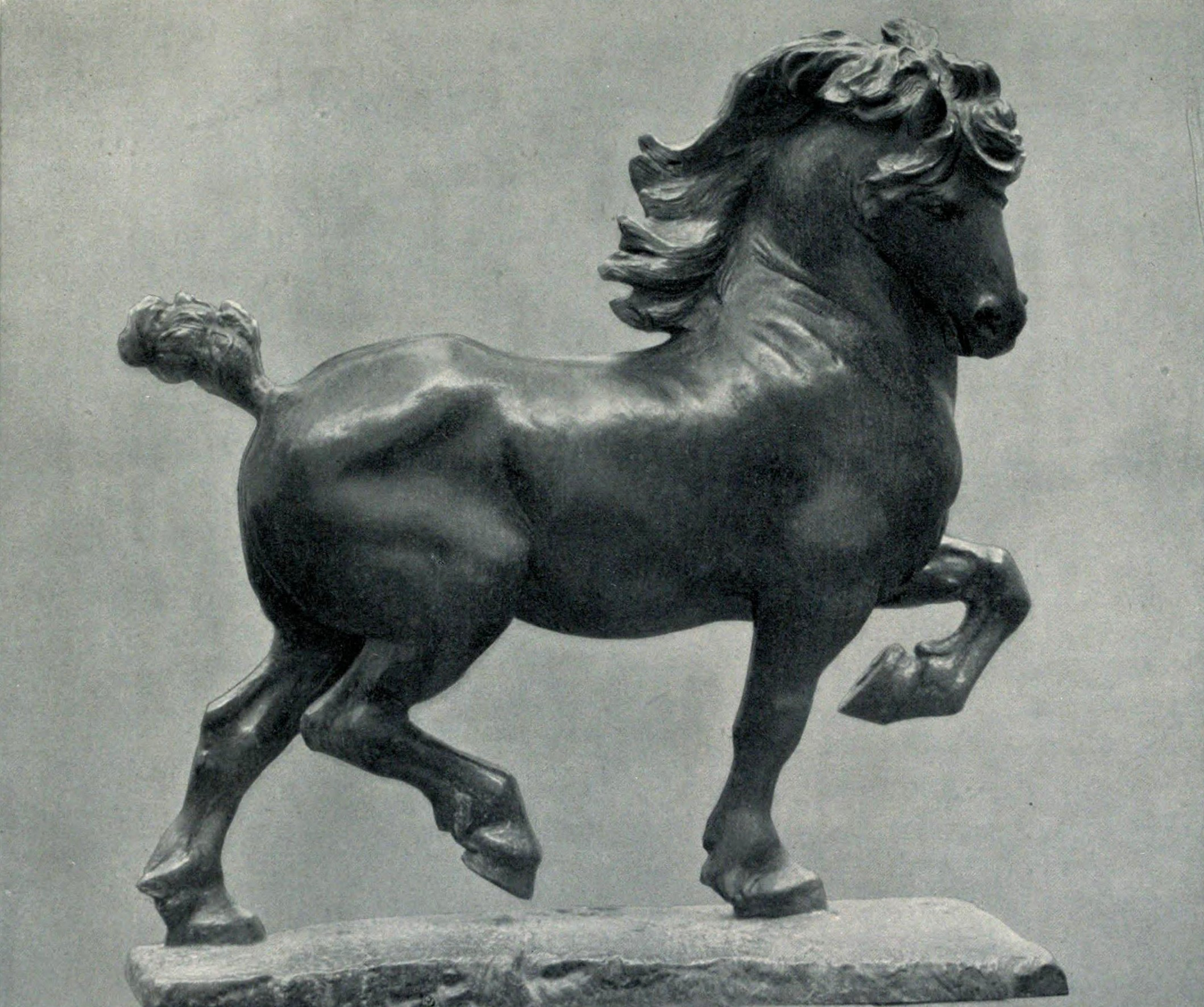
Jacques de Lalaing (date unknown): Brabantine horse

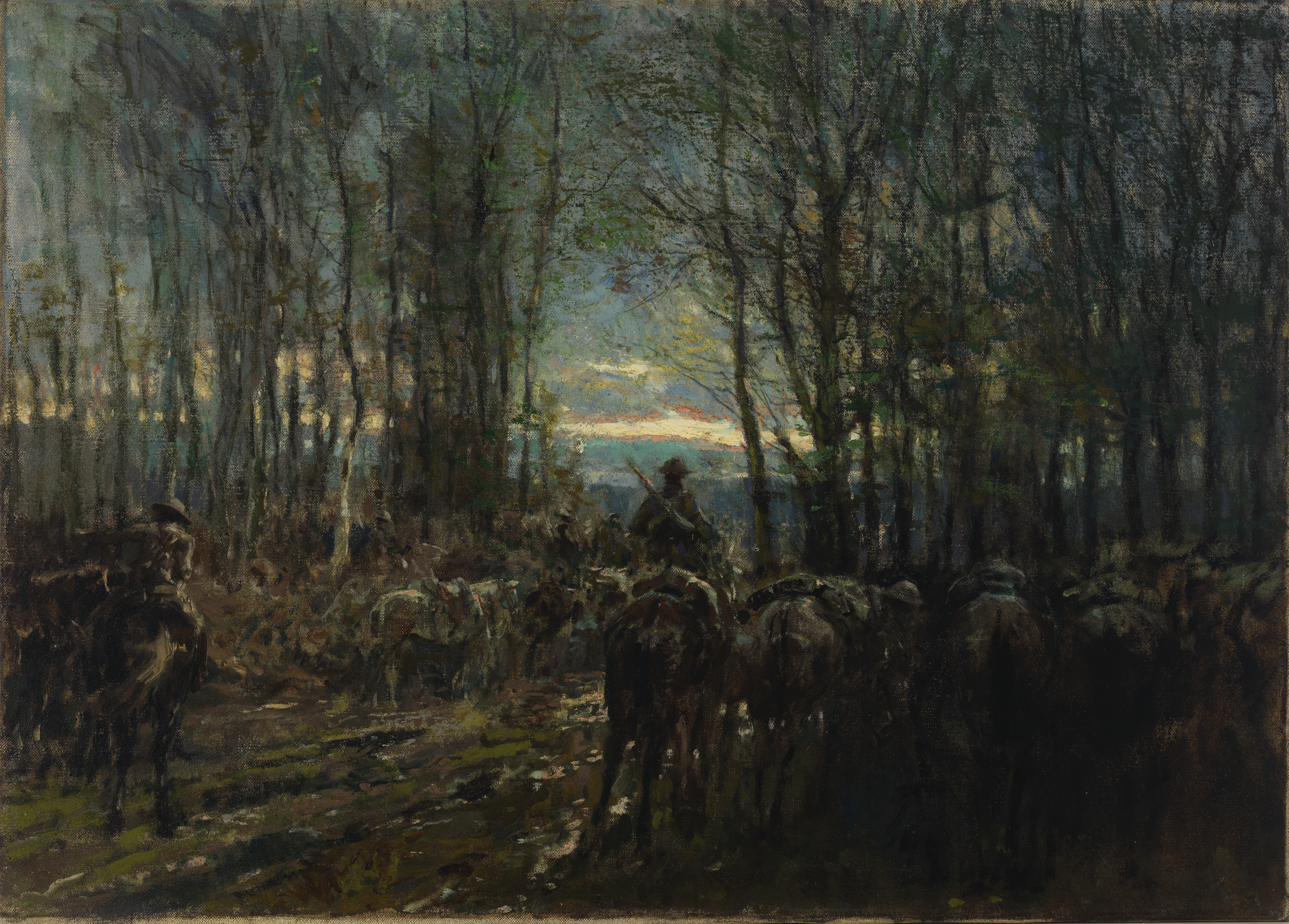
Alfred Theodore Joseph Bastien (date unknown): Canadian Cavalry Ready in a Wood, Canadian War Museum, Ottawa

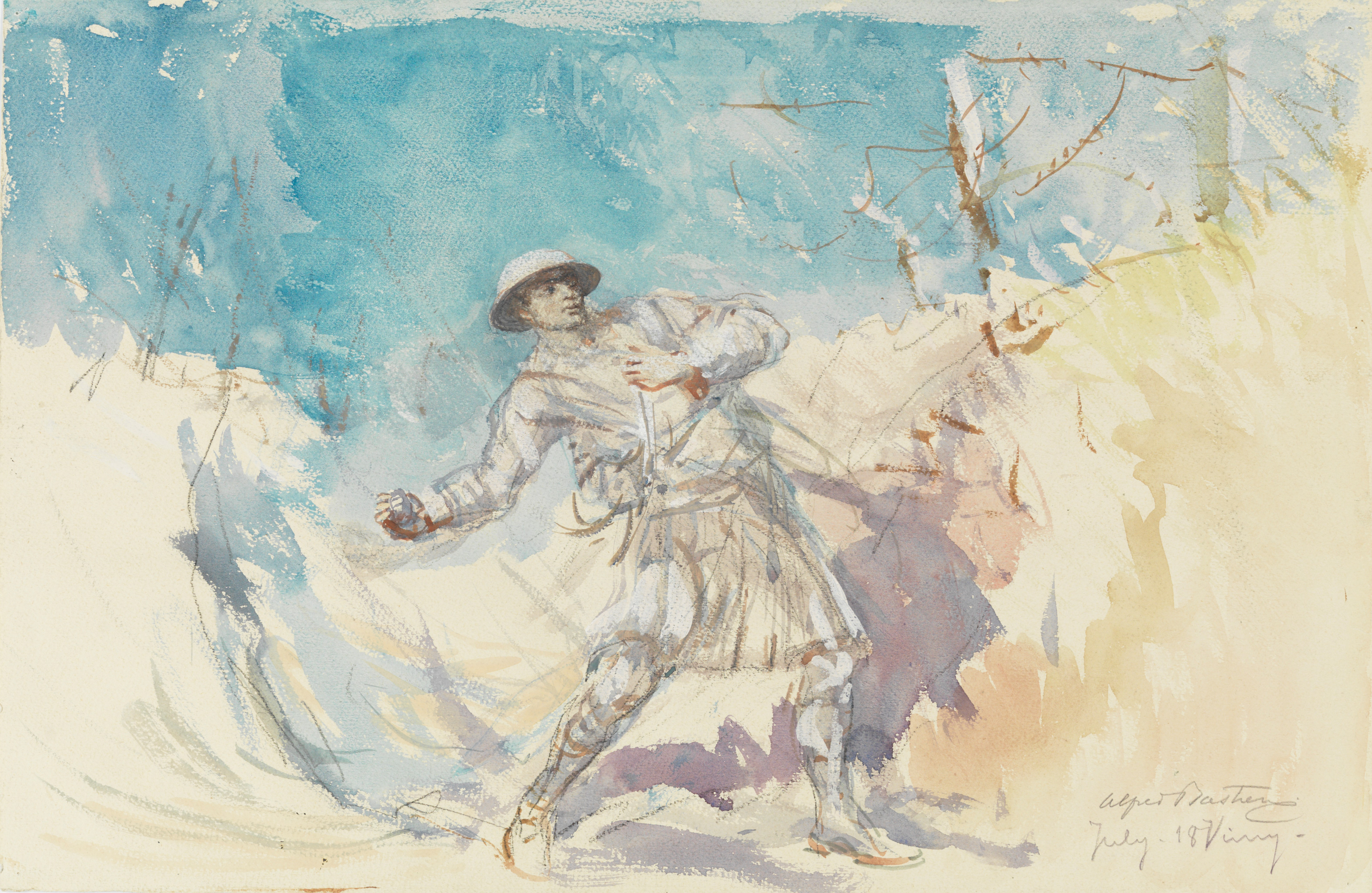
Alfred Theodore Joseph Bastien (1918): Grenade throwing, Canadian War Museum, Ottawa

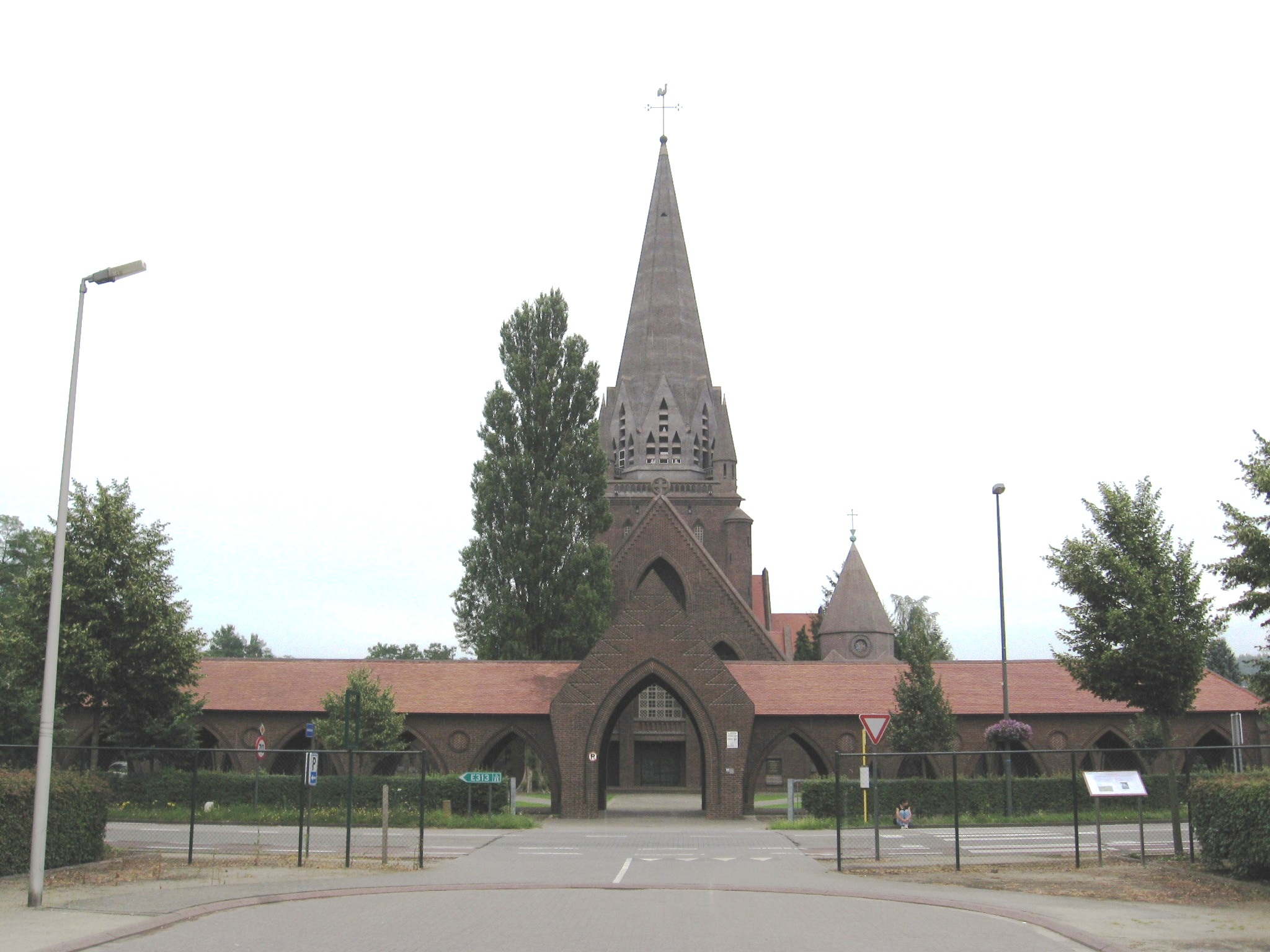
Henry Lacoste (date unknown): St. Theodardus Church, Beringen-Mijn

== Notable students ==
- Joseph-Pierre Braemt (1796–1864), medalist
- François Musin (1820–1888), painter
- Franz Meerts (1836–1896), painter
- Josse Impens (1840–1905), painter
- Gustave Léonard de Jonghe (1844–1848), painter
- Emile Wauters (1846–1933), painter
- Isidore Verheyden (1846–1905), painter
- Alfred Verhaeren (1849–1924), painter
- Amédée Lynen (1852–1938), painter and illustrator
- Vincent van Gogh (1853–1890), Dutch painter
- Jan Hillebrand Wijsmuller (1855–1925), Dutch painter
- Paul Du Bois (1859–1938), French sculptor
- James Ensor (1860–1949), painter
- Victor Rousseau (1865–1954), sculptor
- Jef Leempoels (1867–1935), painter
- Gabriel Van Dievoet (1875–1934), painter
- Mercédès Legrand (1893–1945), Spanish-born Belgian painter and sculptor
- Victor Servranckx (1897–1965), painter
- Paul Delvaux (1897–1994), painter
- René Magritte (1898–1967), painter
- Éliane de Meuse (1899–1993), painter
- Claudia Cobizev (1905-1995), Moldovan sculptor
- Zhang Chongren, better known as Tschang Tschong-jen (1907–1998), Chinese sculptor and painter
- Ben-Ami Shulman, (1907–1986), Israeli architect
- Claude Strebelle (1917–2010), architect and builder

== Gallery of works by notable students ==
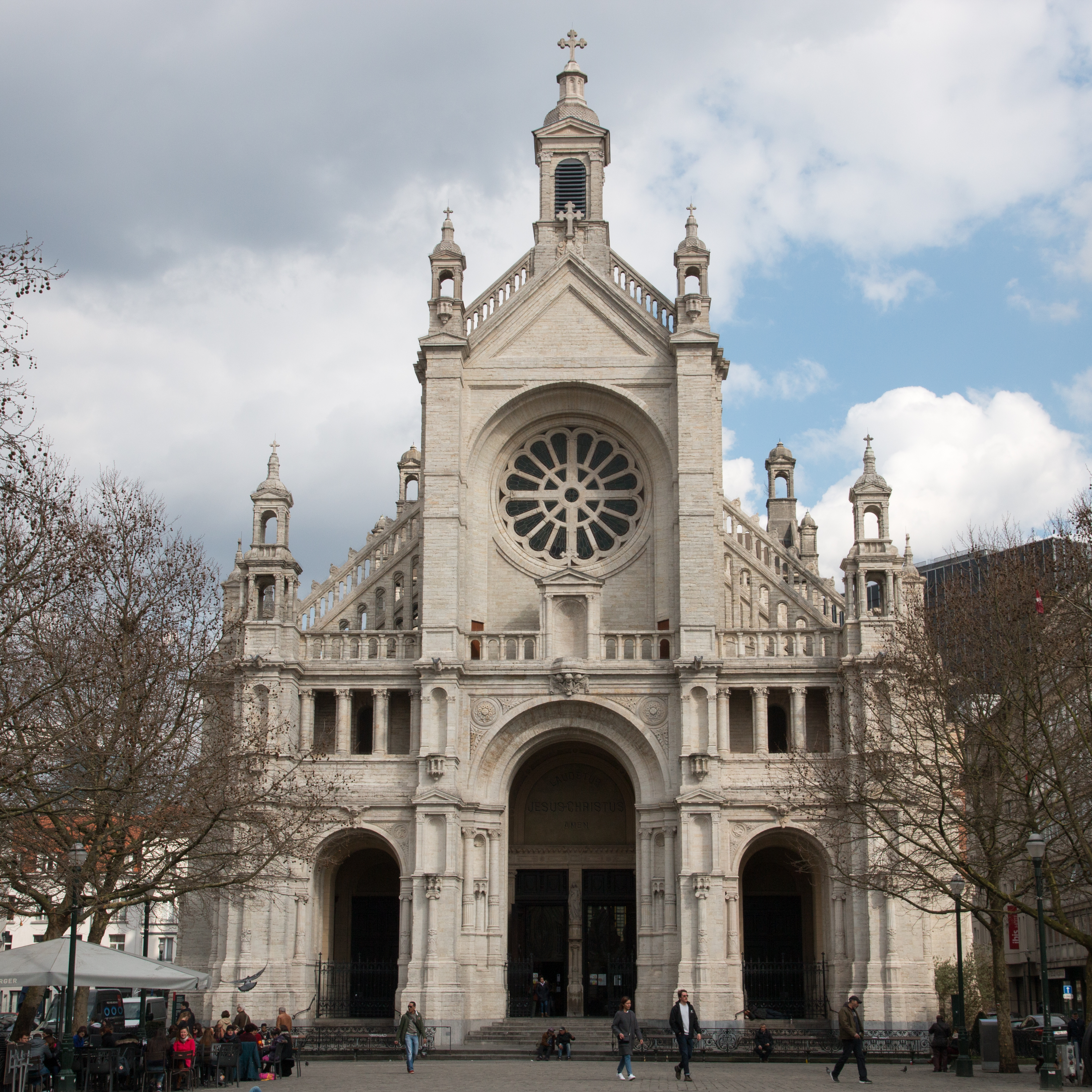
Joseph Poelaert (date unknown): New building of the Church of St. Catherine, Brussels

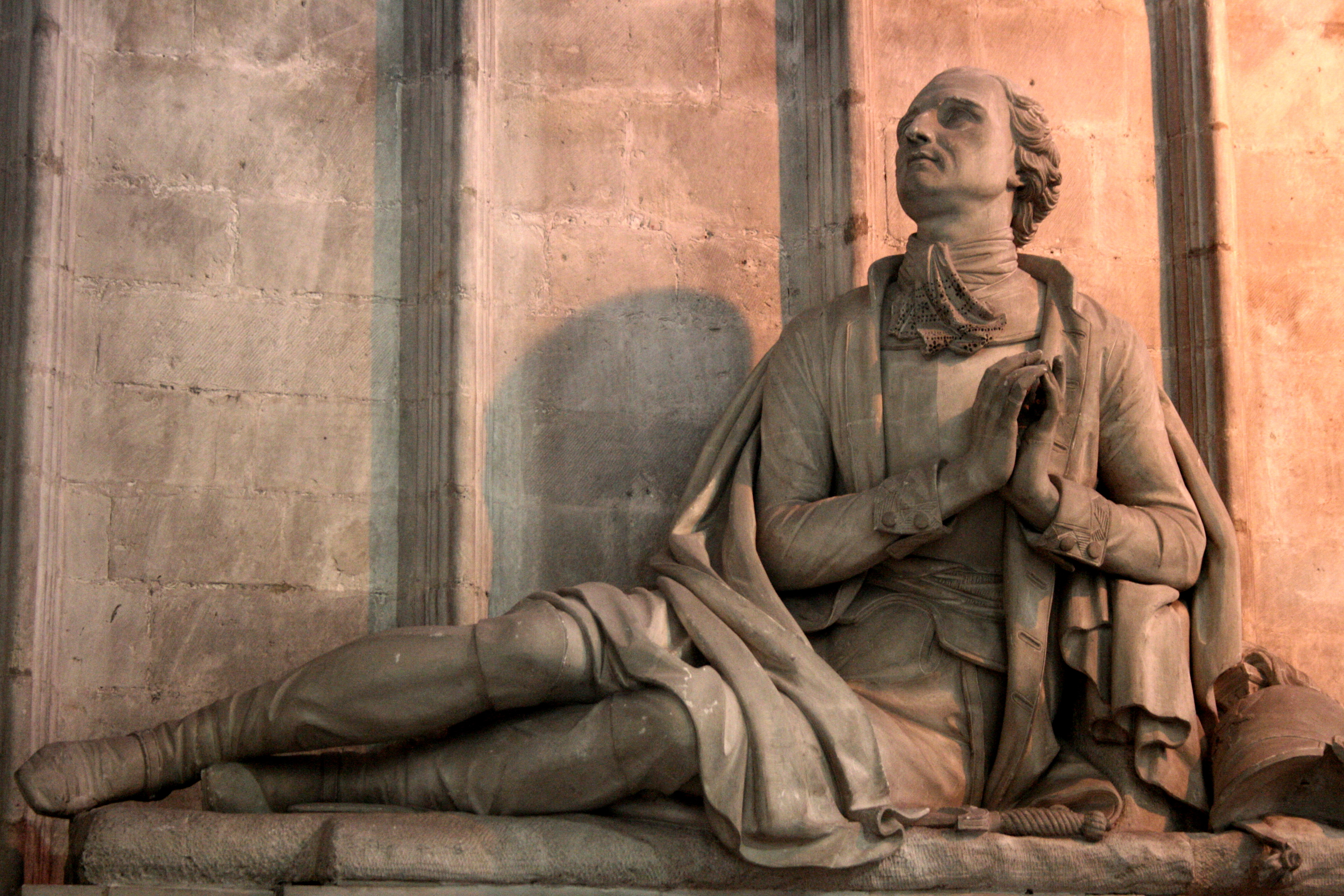
Jean-Frédéric Van der Rit (1856): Tomb of Augustus dal Pozzo at the Church of Our Lady of Victories at the Sablon, Brussels

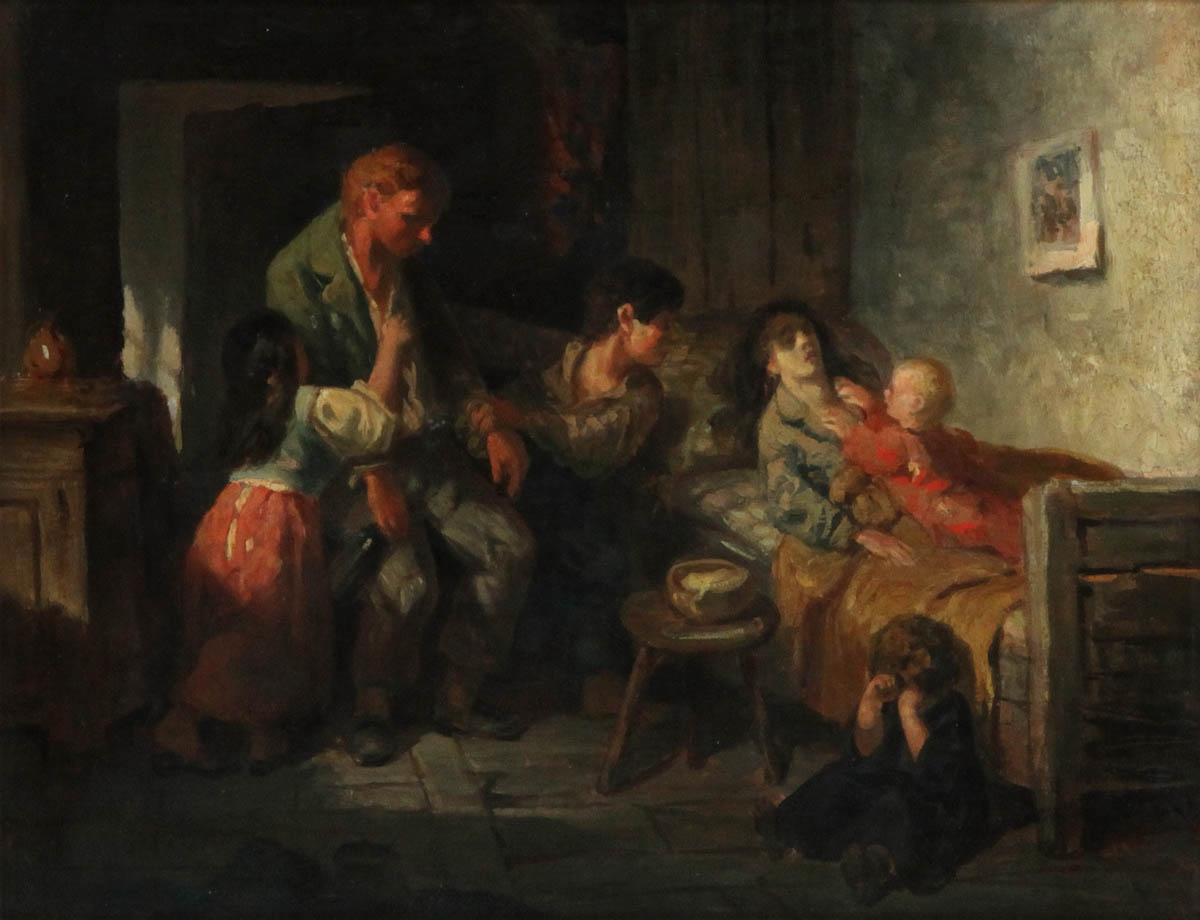
Charles de Groux (1856/57): The farewell

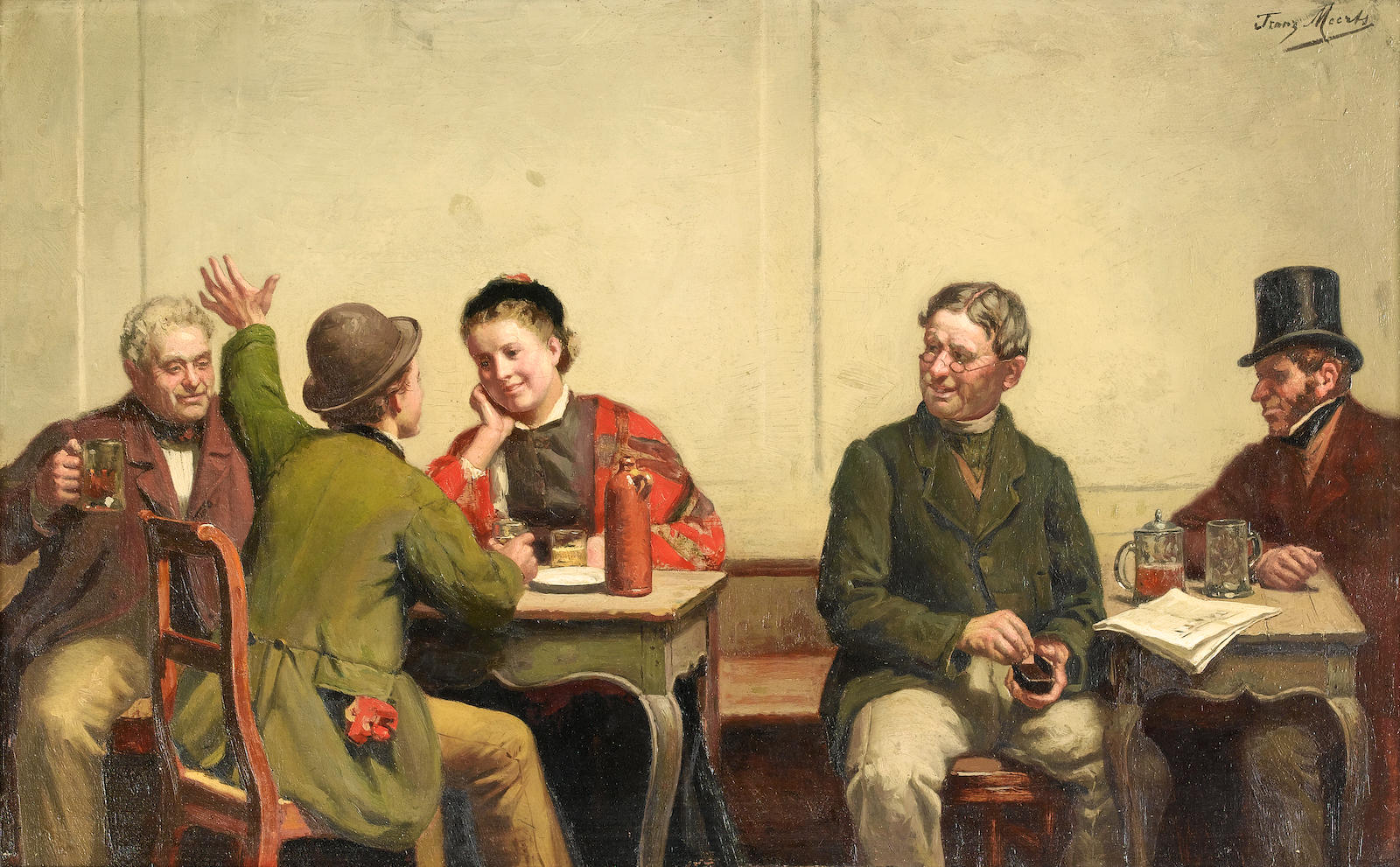
Franz Meerts (date unknown): At the café, Private collection

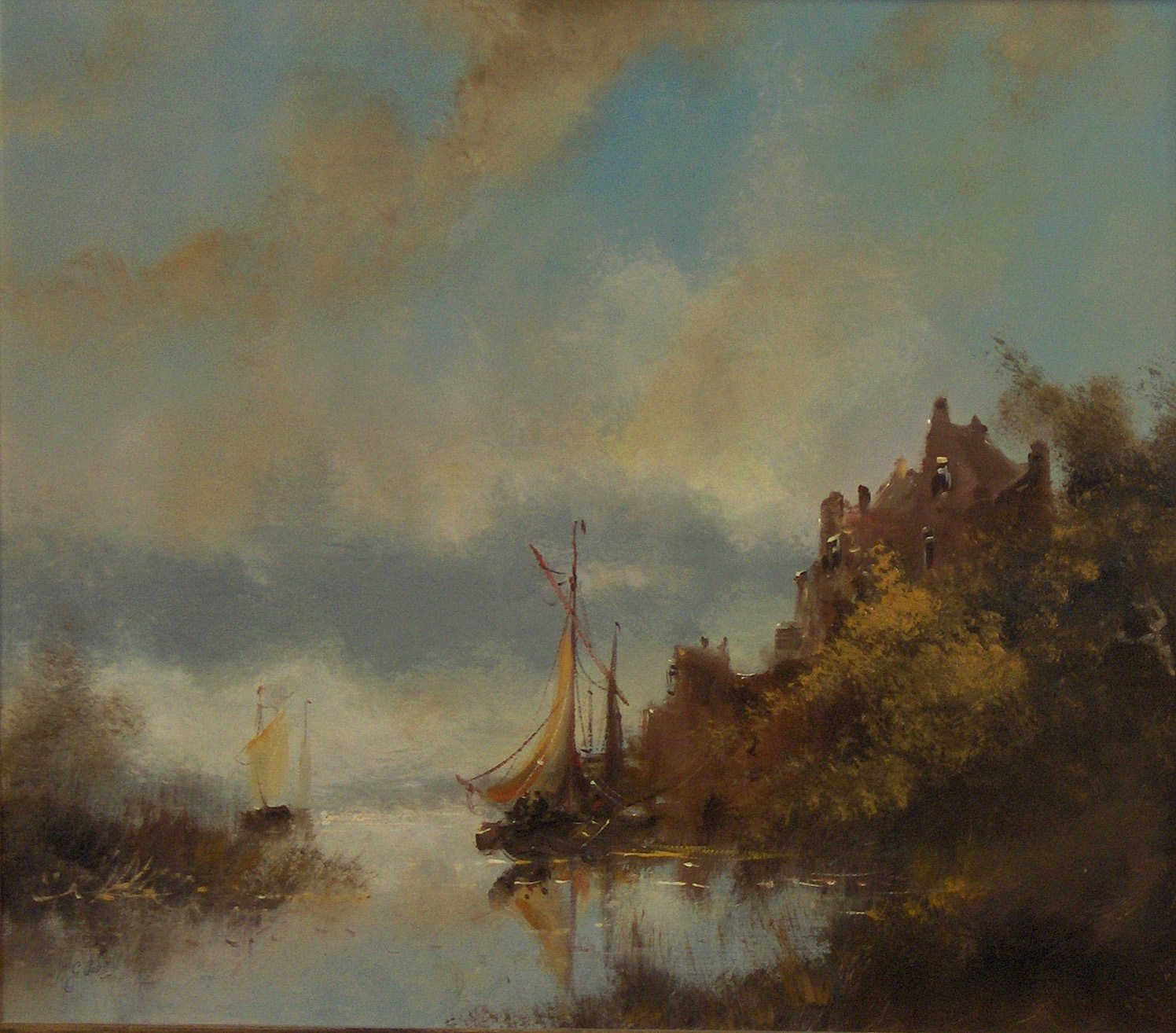
Guillaume Vogels (date unknown): Fishing boat on the shore, Private collection

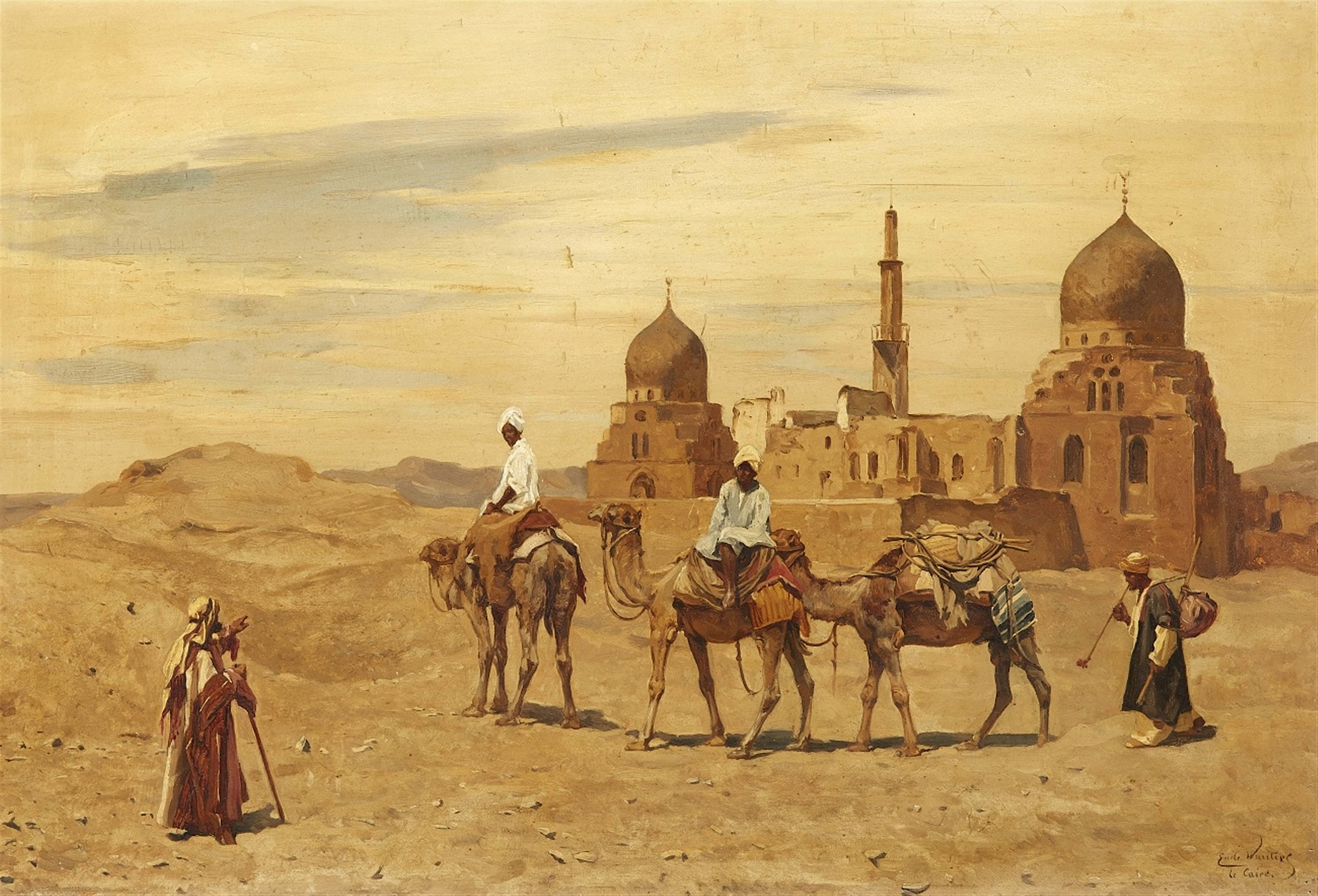
Emile Wauters (date unknown): Caravan near Cairo, Private collection

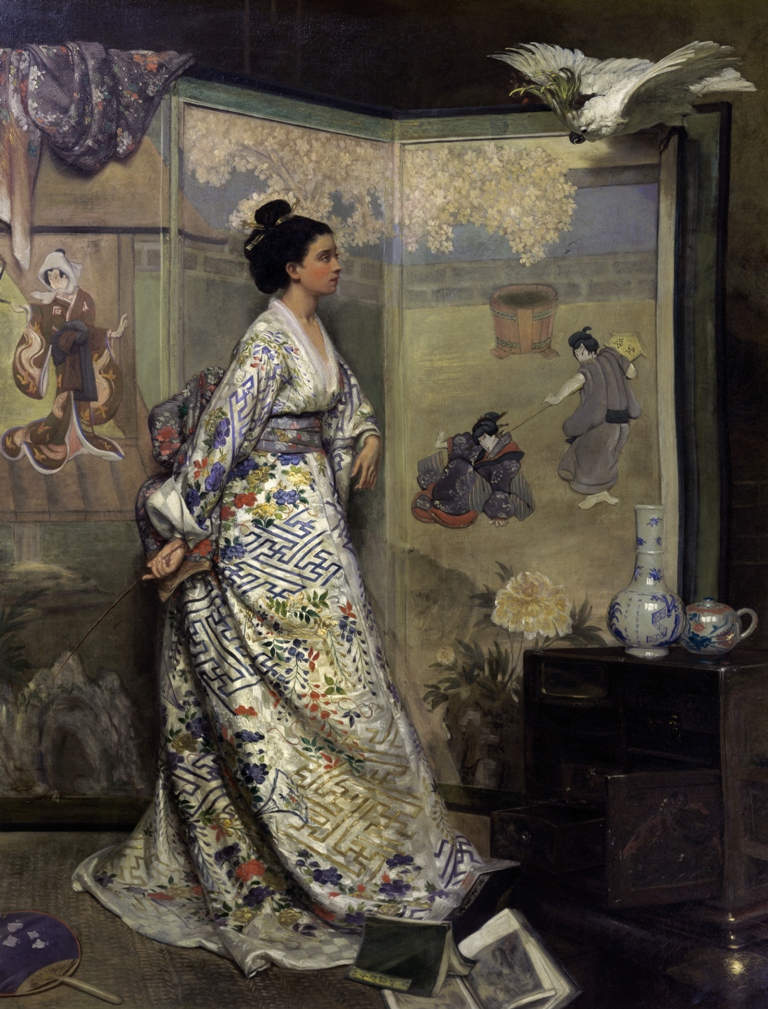
Gustave Léonard de Jonghe (1865): The Japanese Fan, Cummer Museum of Art and Gardens

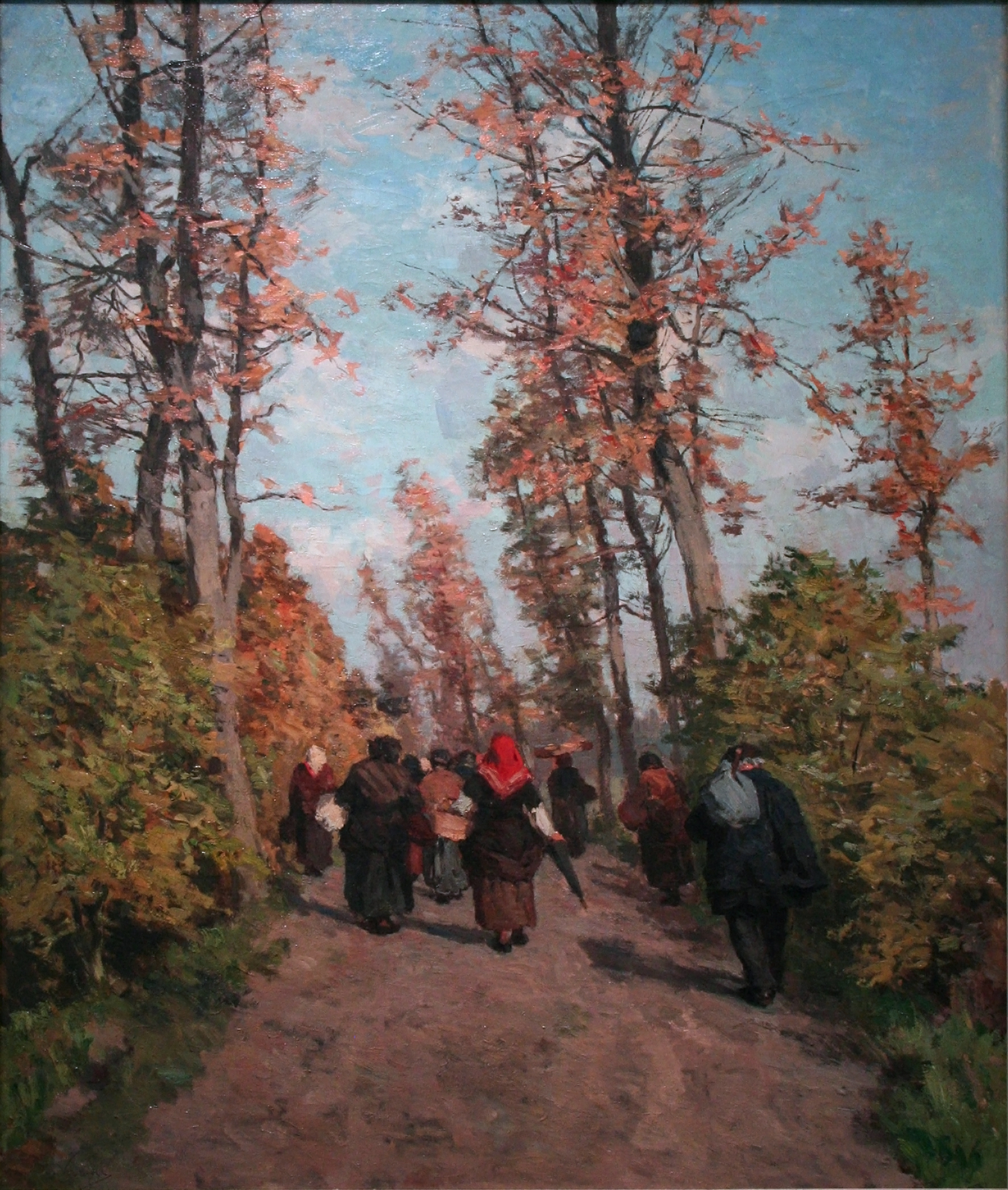
Isidore Verheyden (date unknown): Return from the market, Museum M, Leuven

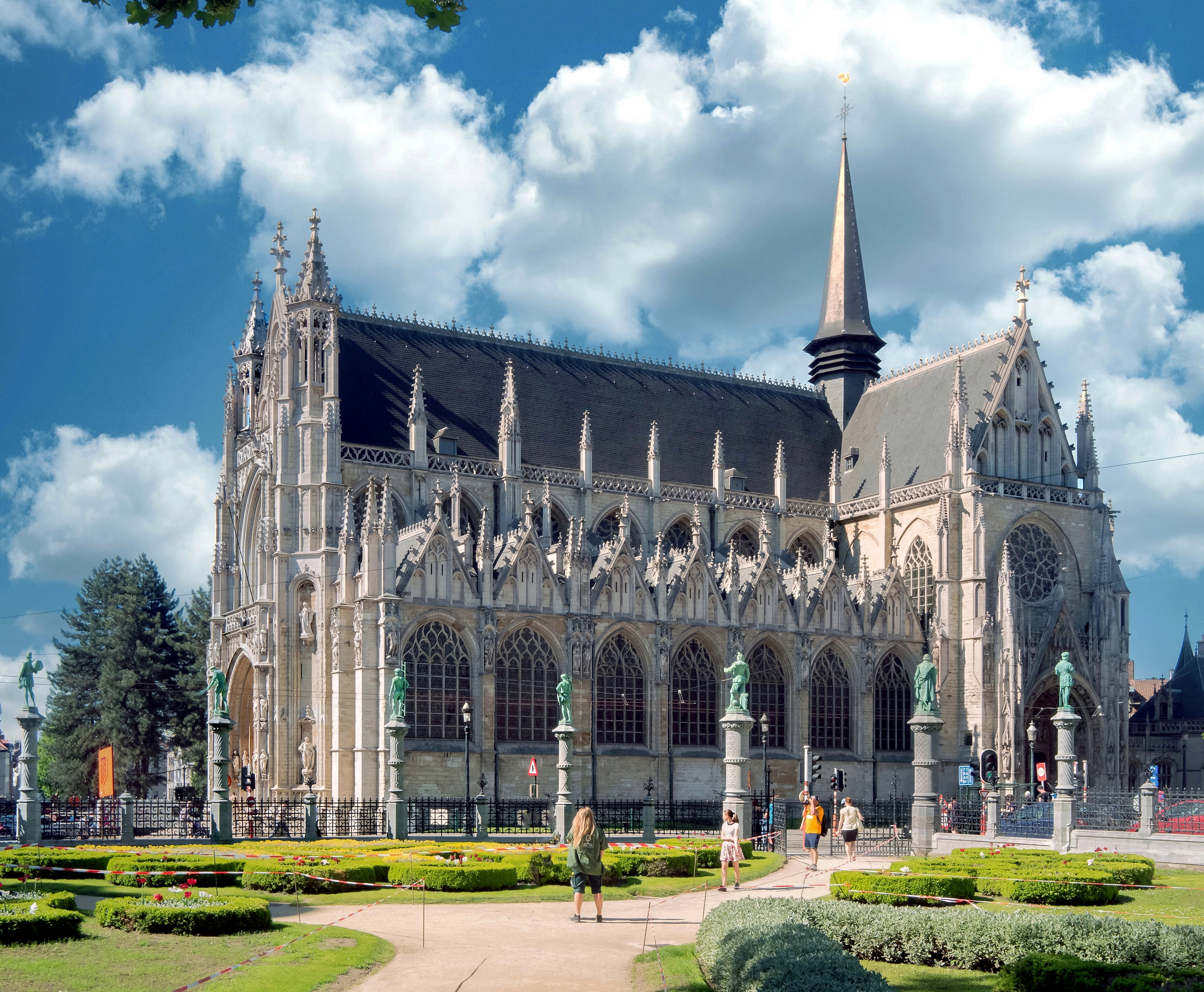
August Félix Schoy (1865): Restoration of the Church of Our Lady of Victories at the Sablon, Brussels

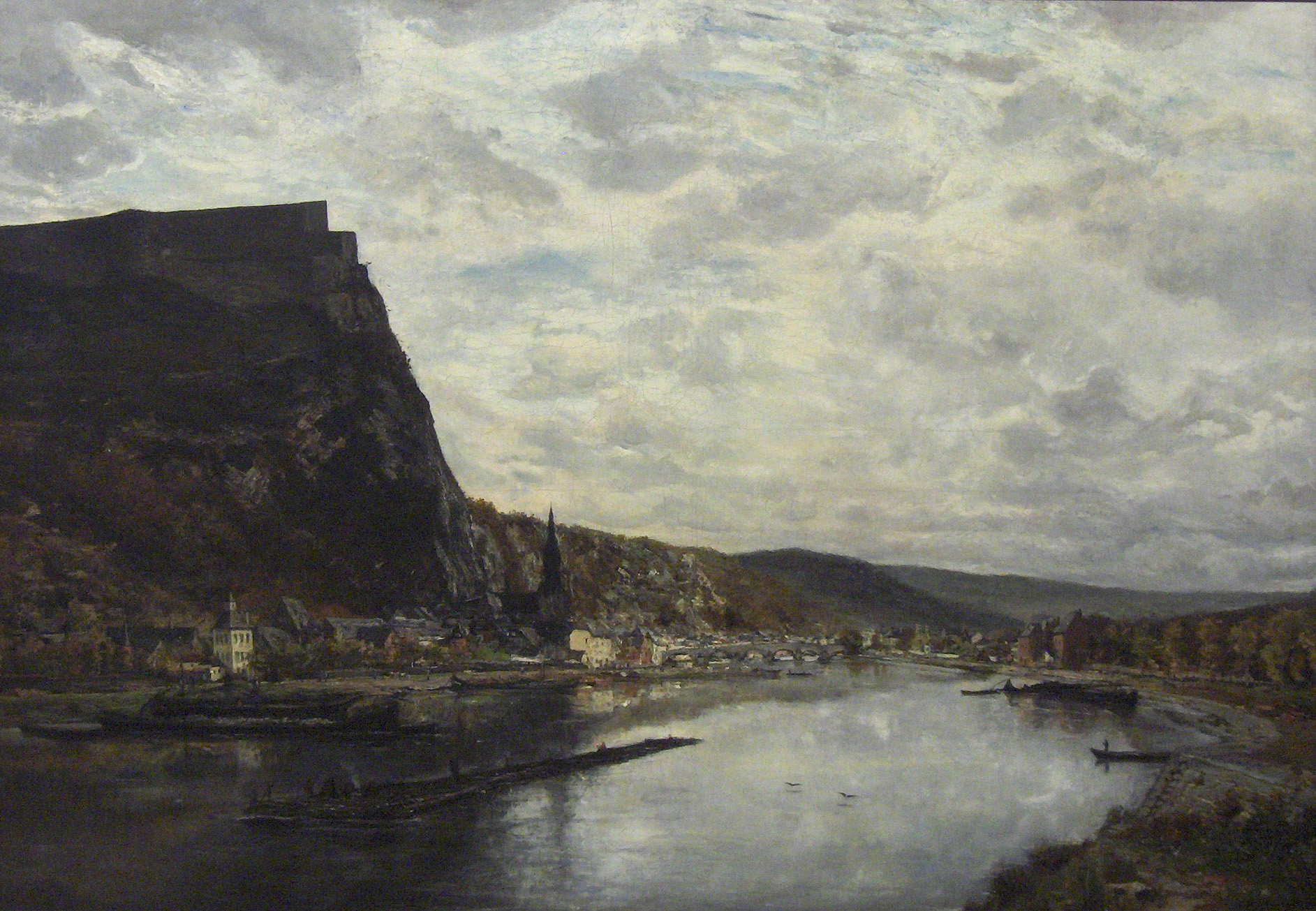
Hippolyte Boulenger (1870): View of Dinant, Royal Museum of Fine Arts of Belgium, Brussels

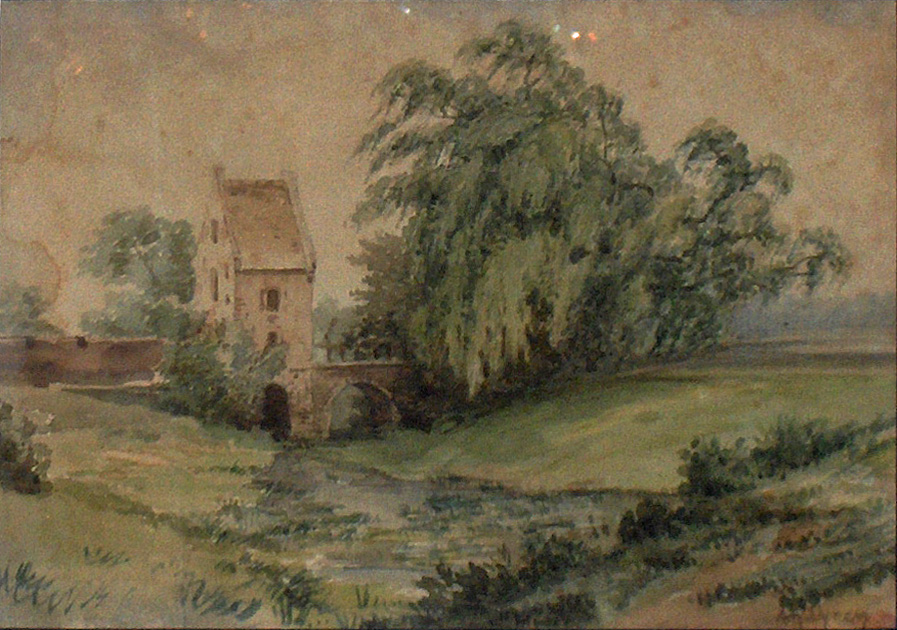
Amadée Lynen (after 1872): Landscape with farm, Private collection

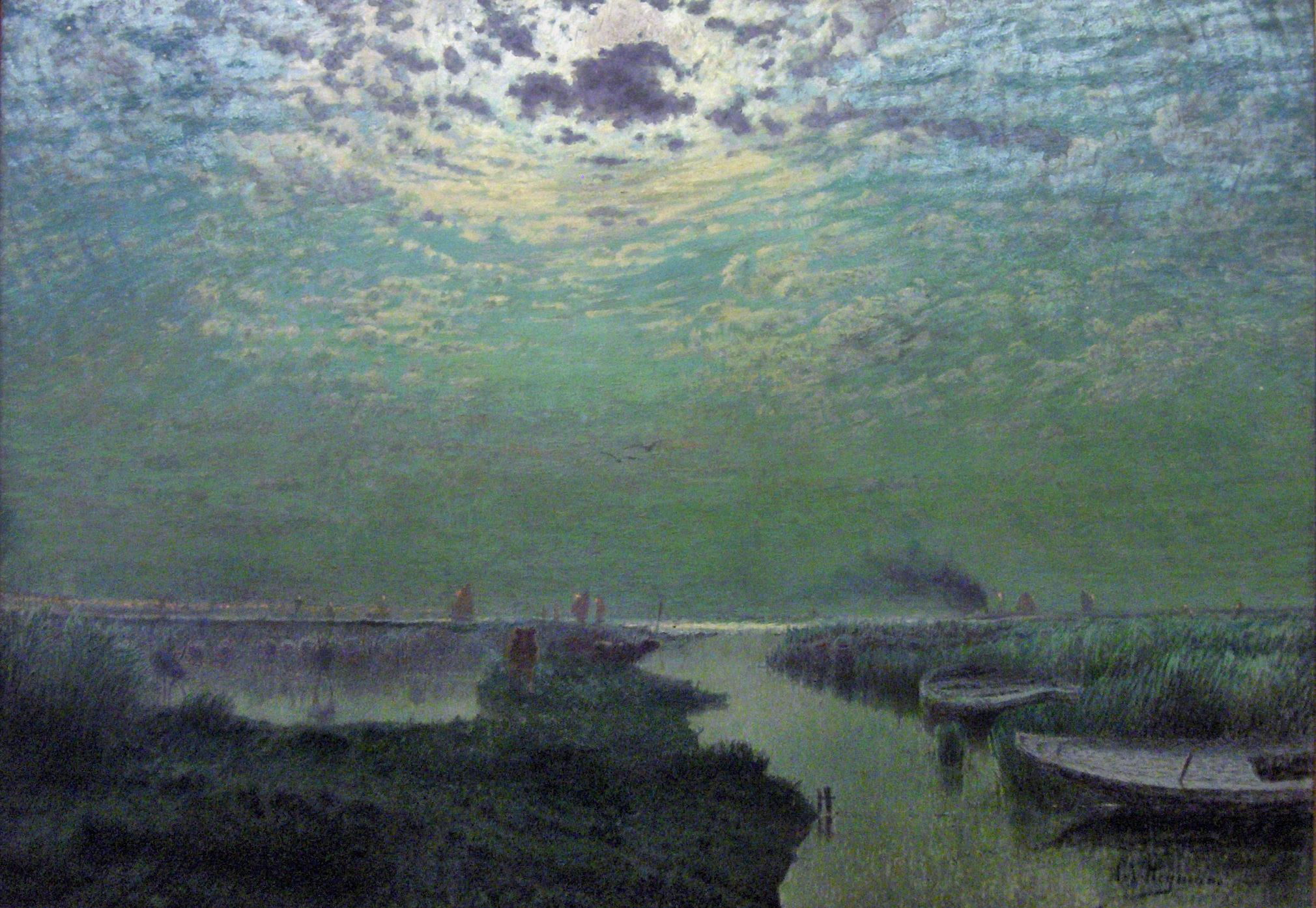
Adrien-Joseph Heymans (1875): Sky with the moonlight, Royal Museum of Fine Arts of Belgium, Brussels

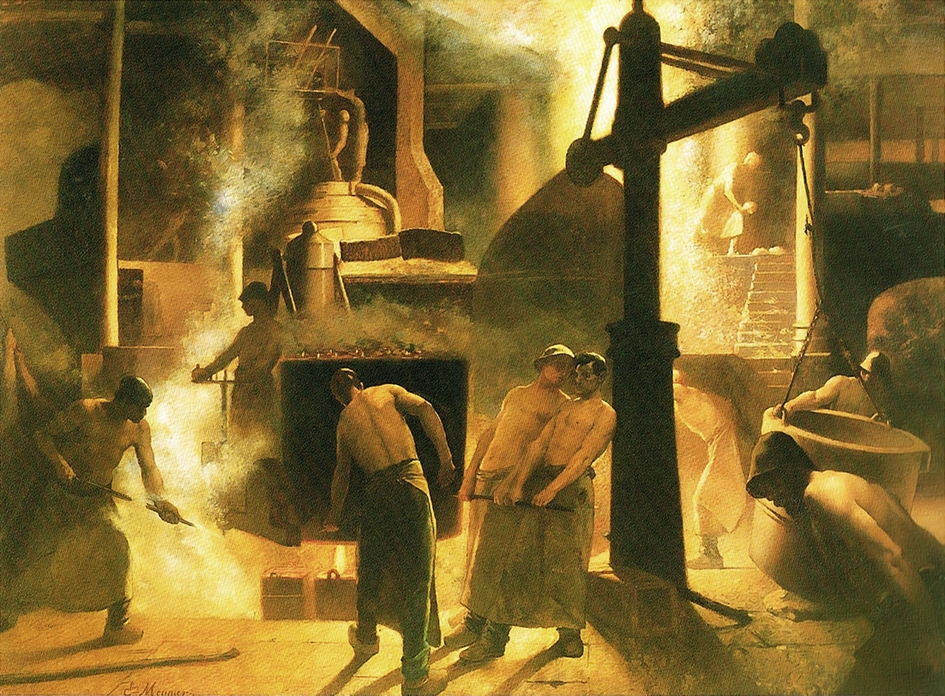
Constantin Meunier (1885/1890): The foundry of Ougrée, Musée de l'Art Wallon, Liège

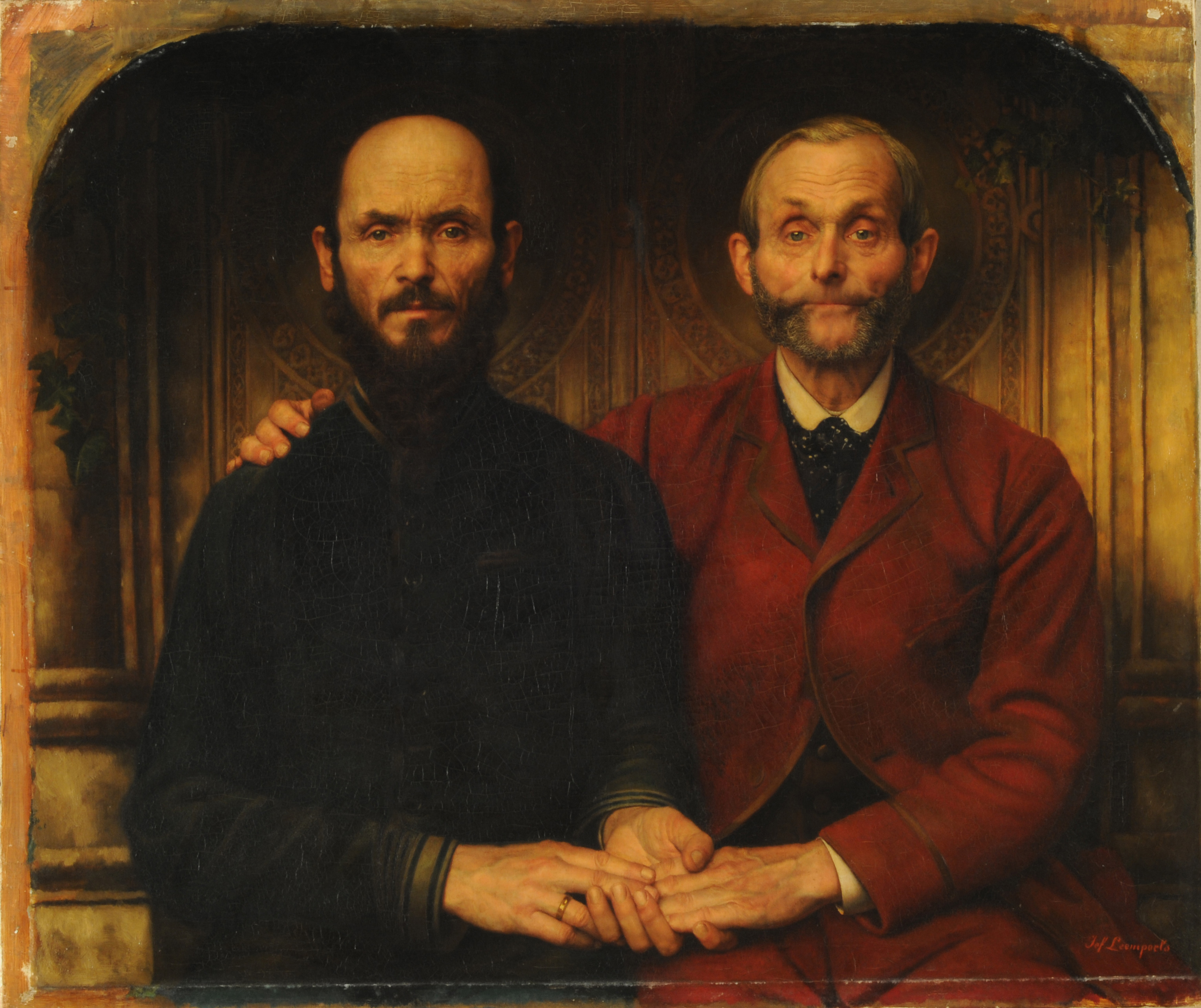
Jef Leempoels (1888): Friendship, The Morgan Library and Museum, New York

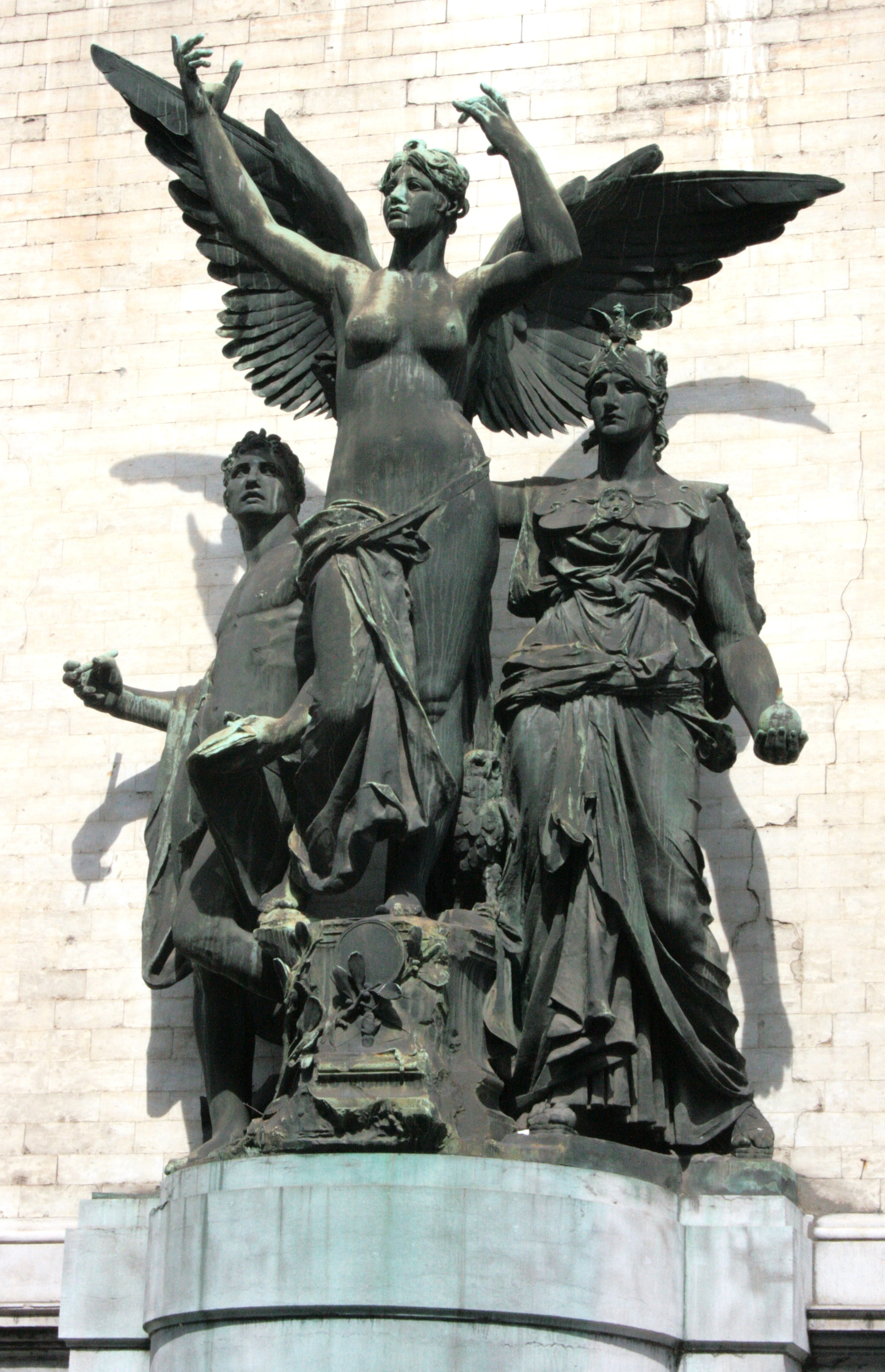
Charles van der Stappen (date unknown): Detail of the facade of the Royal Museum of Fine Arts of Belgium, Brussels

Vincent van Gogh (1896): Friendship, Museo Nacional de Bellas Artes, Buenos Aires

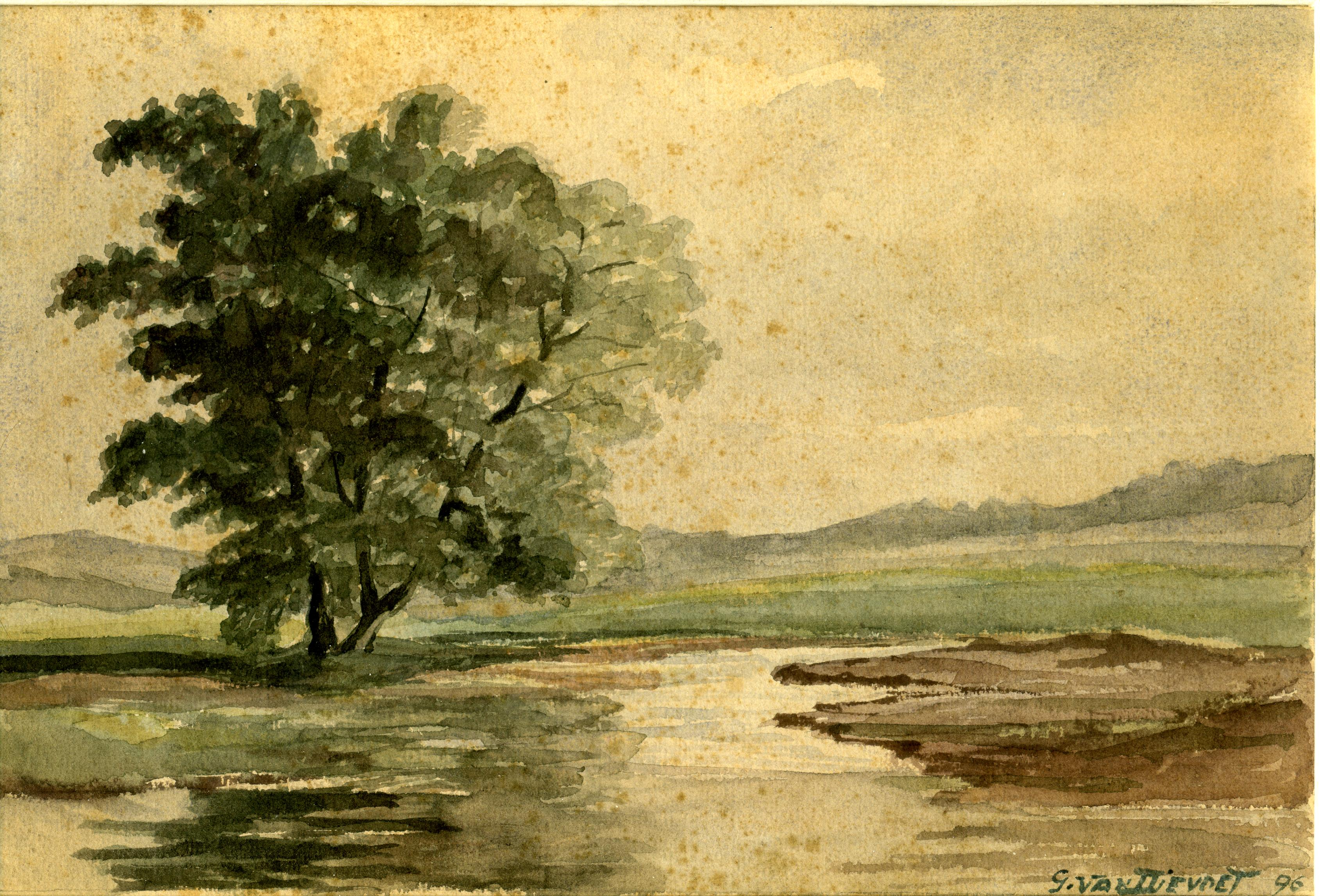
Gabriel Van Dievoet (1896): Lake, Private collection

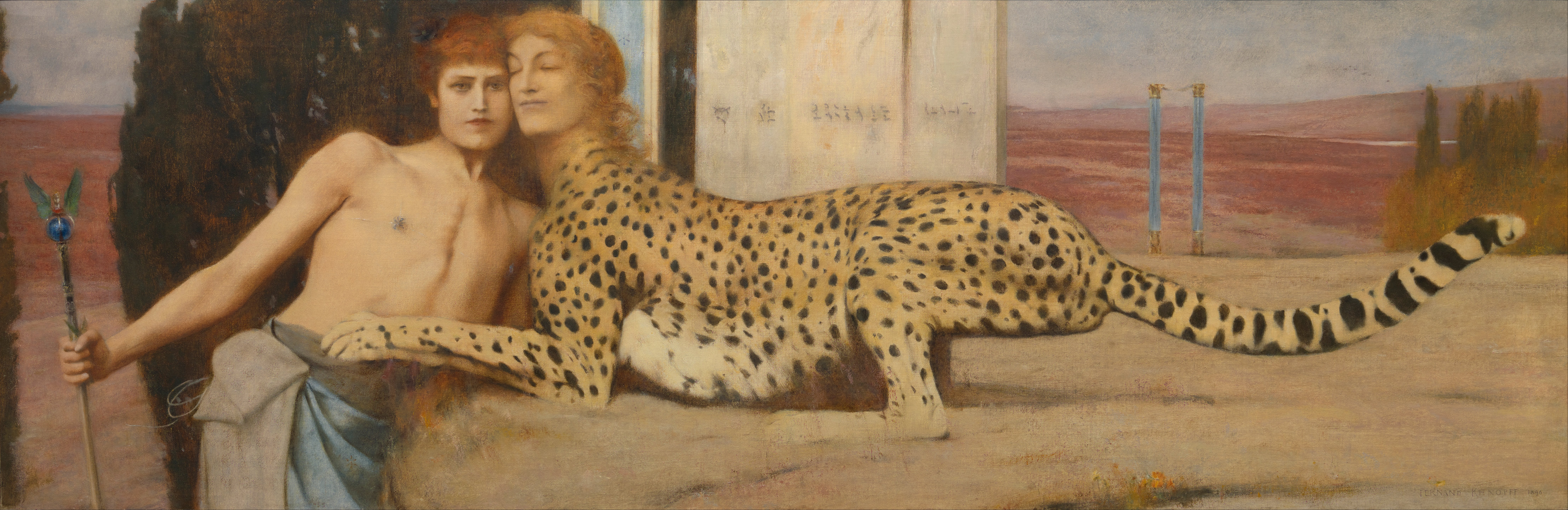
Fernand Khnopff (1896): Carelessness or the tenderness of Sphinx, Royal Museum of Fine Arts of Belgium, Brussels

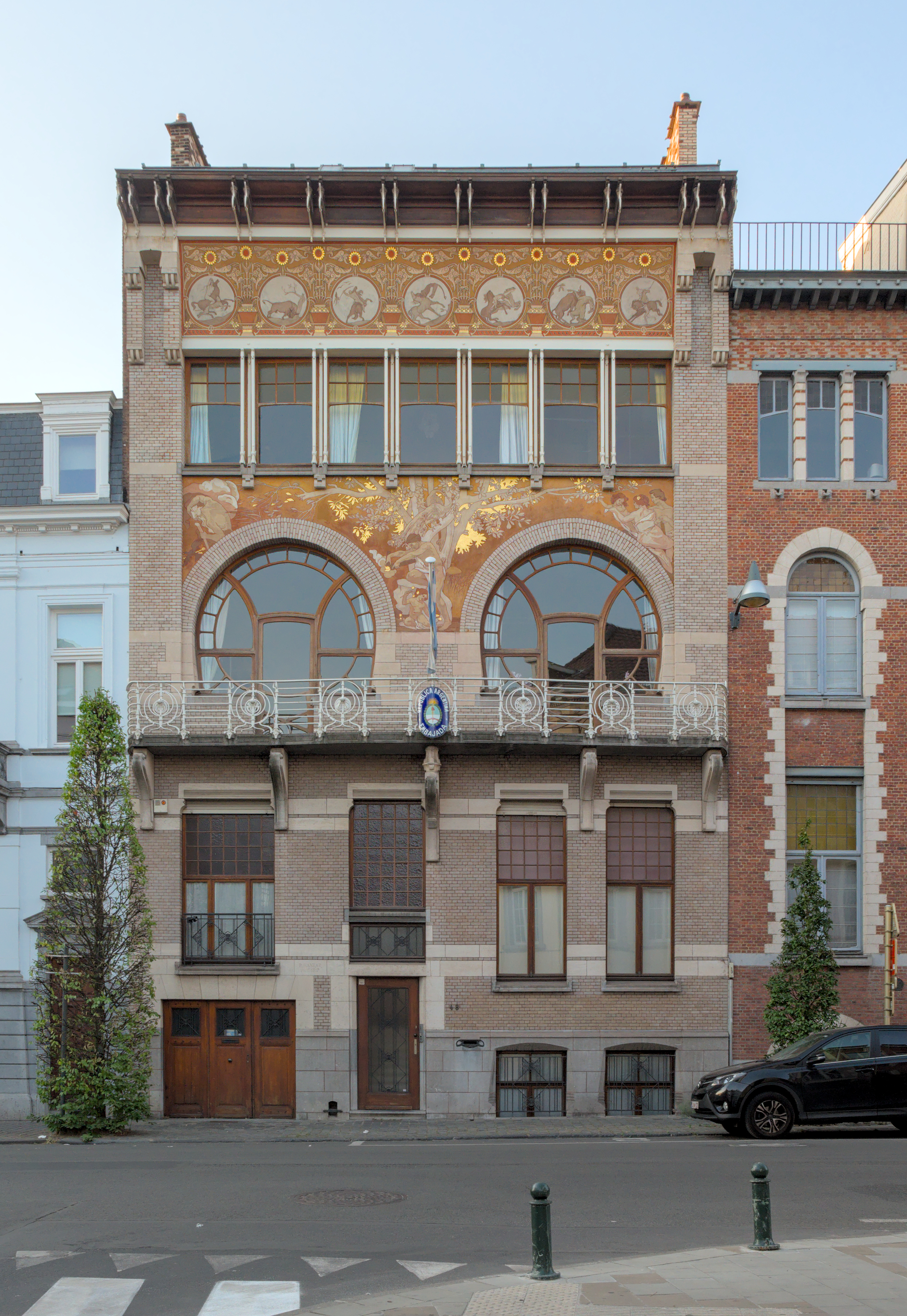
Paul Hankar (1897): Hôtel Albert Ciamberlani, Rue Defaqz/Defaqzstraat, Brussels

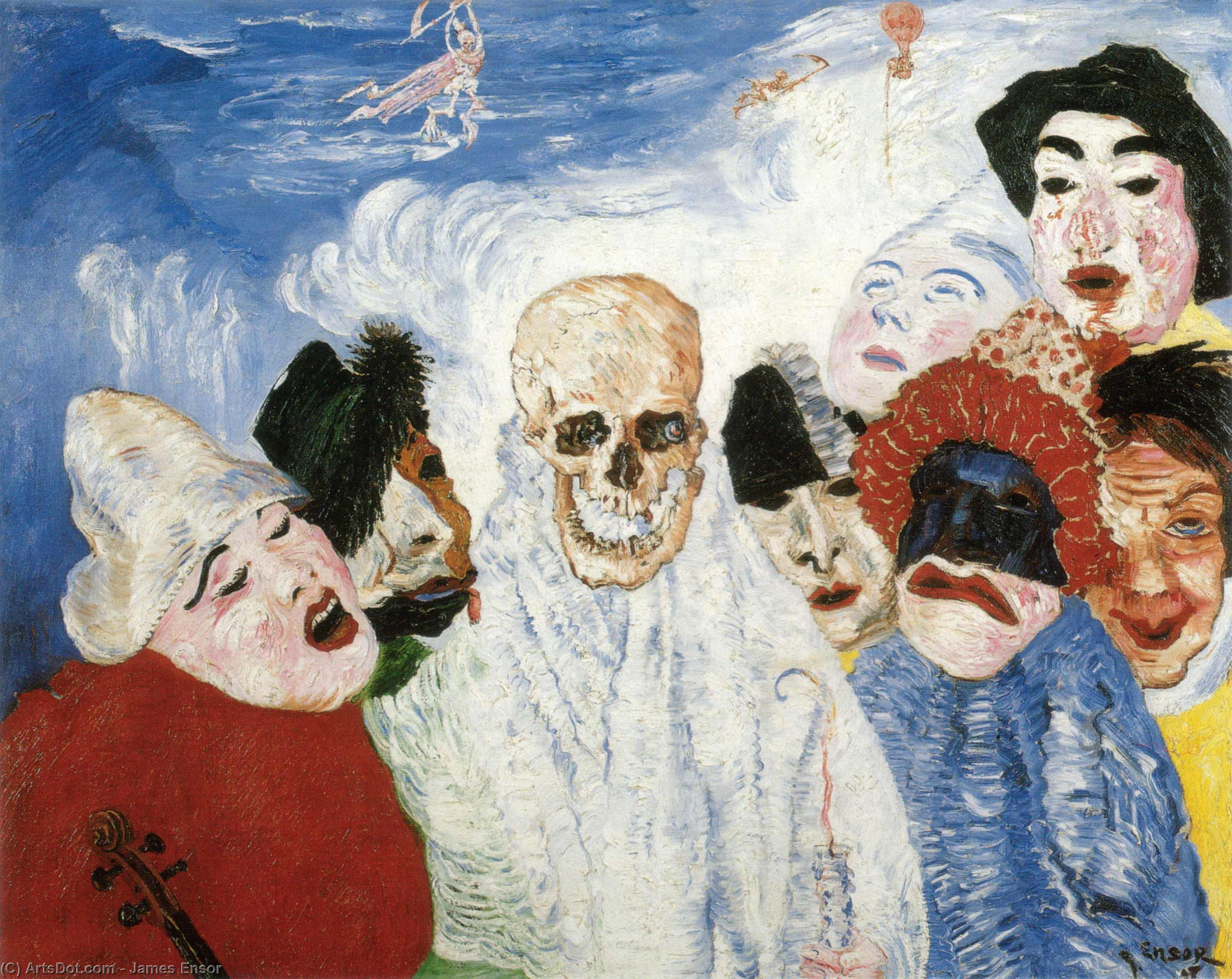
James Ensor (1897): Death and the masks, Musée des beaux-arts de Liège

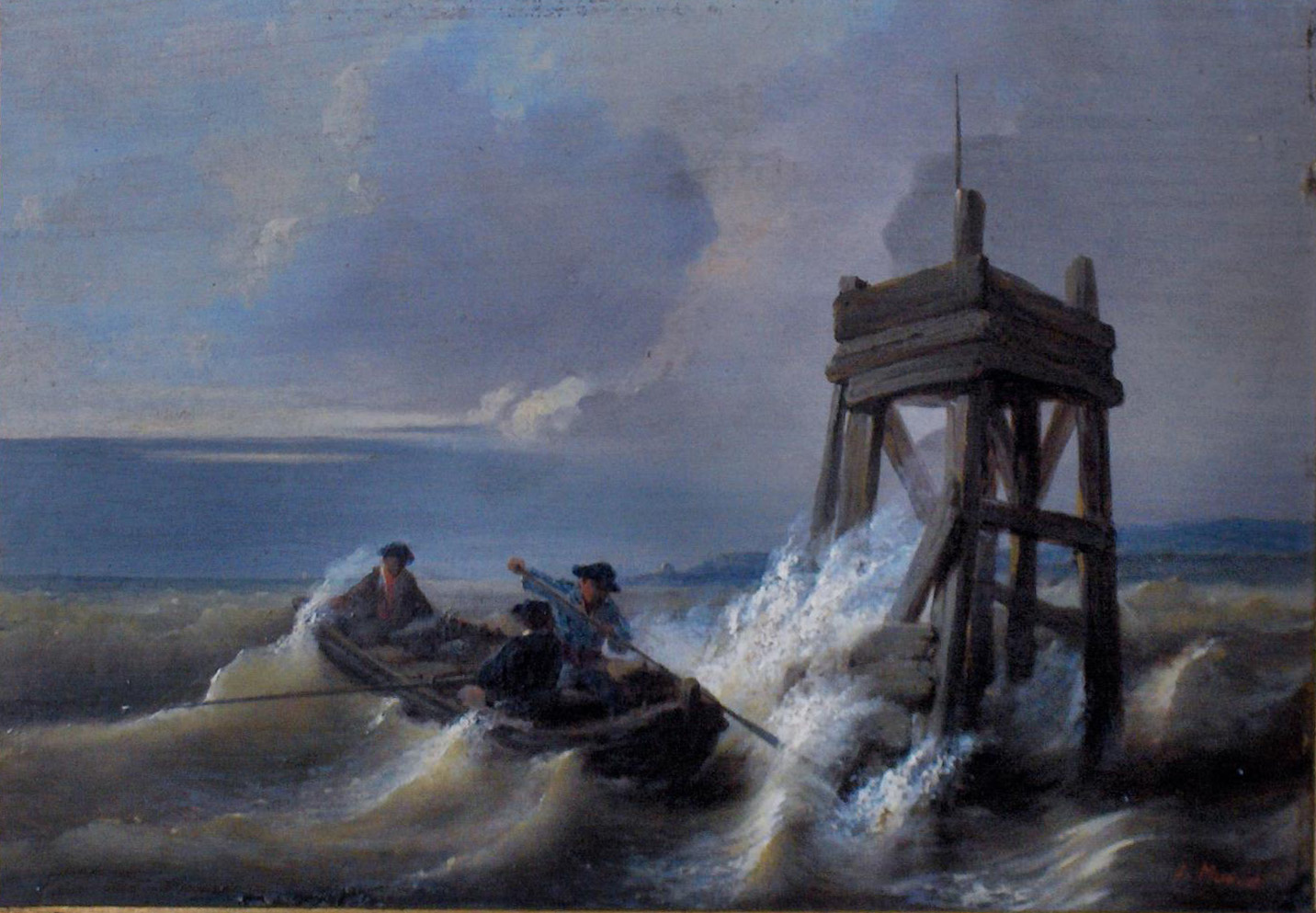
François Musin (date unknown): Stormy weather, Private collection

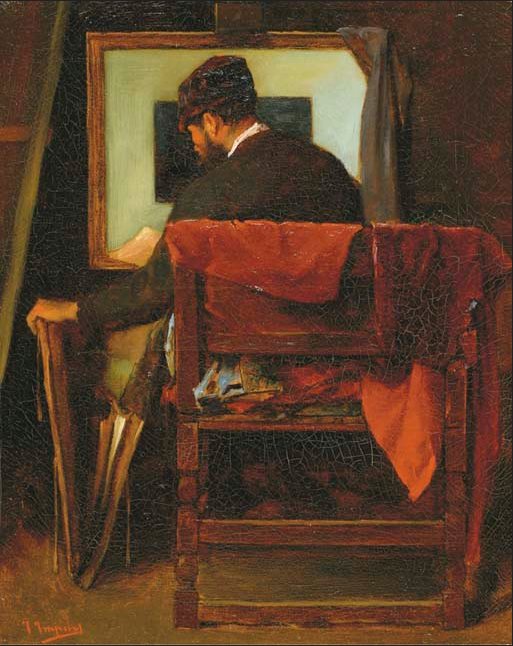
Josse Impens (date unknown): Painter in front of his easel, Private collection

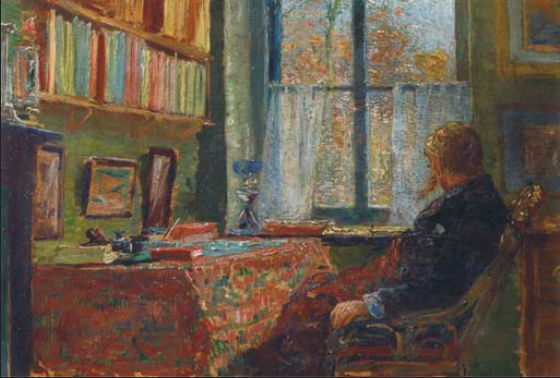
Alfred Verhaeren (date unknown): Lost in thoughts, Private collection

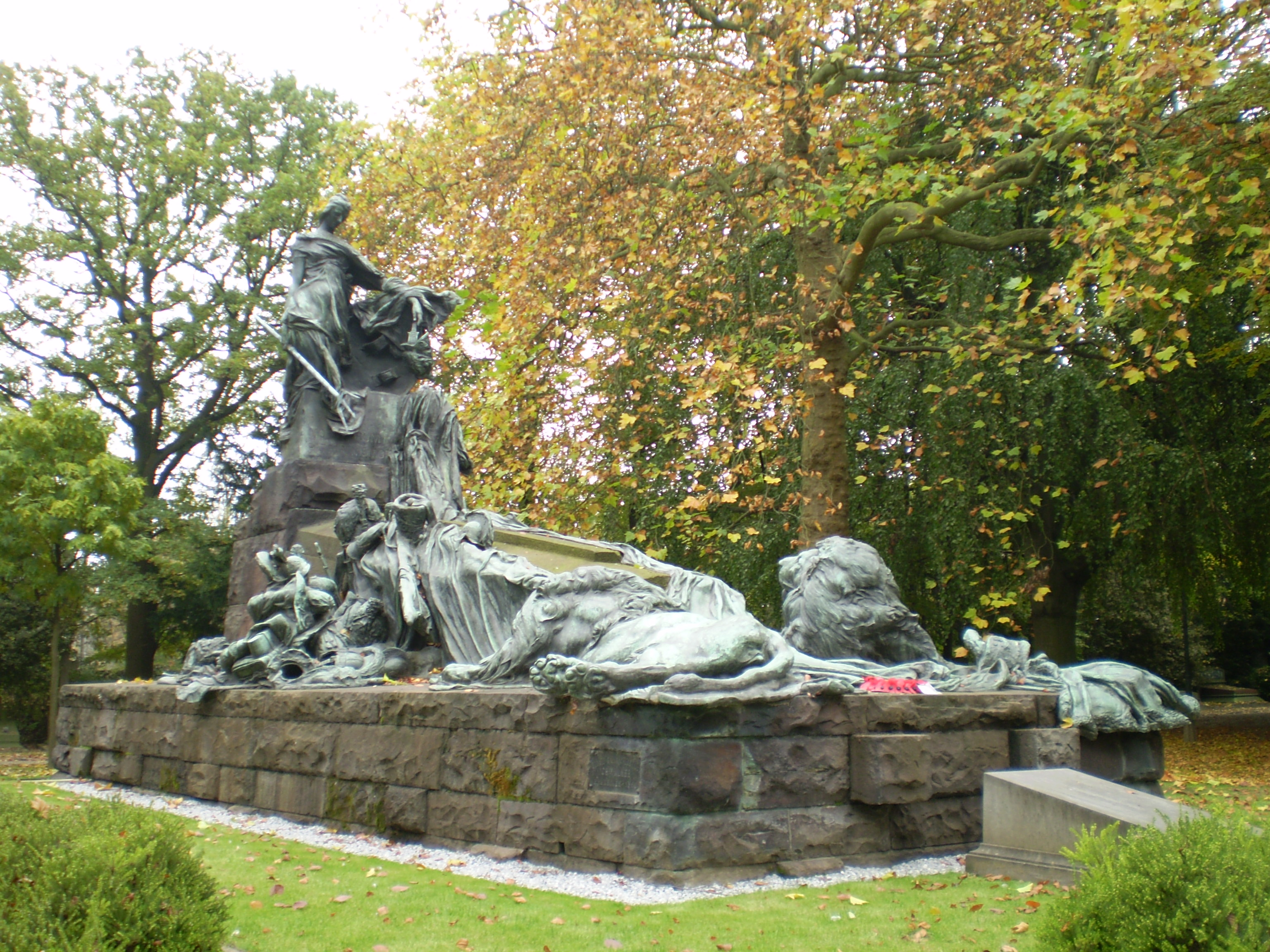
Jacques de Lalaing (date unknown): British Waterloo Memorial, Brussels Cemetery

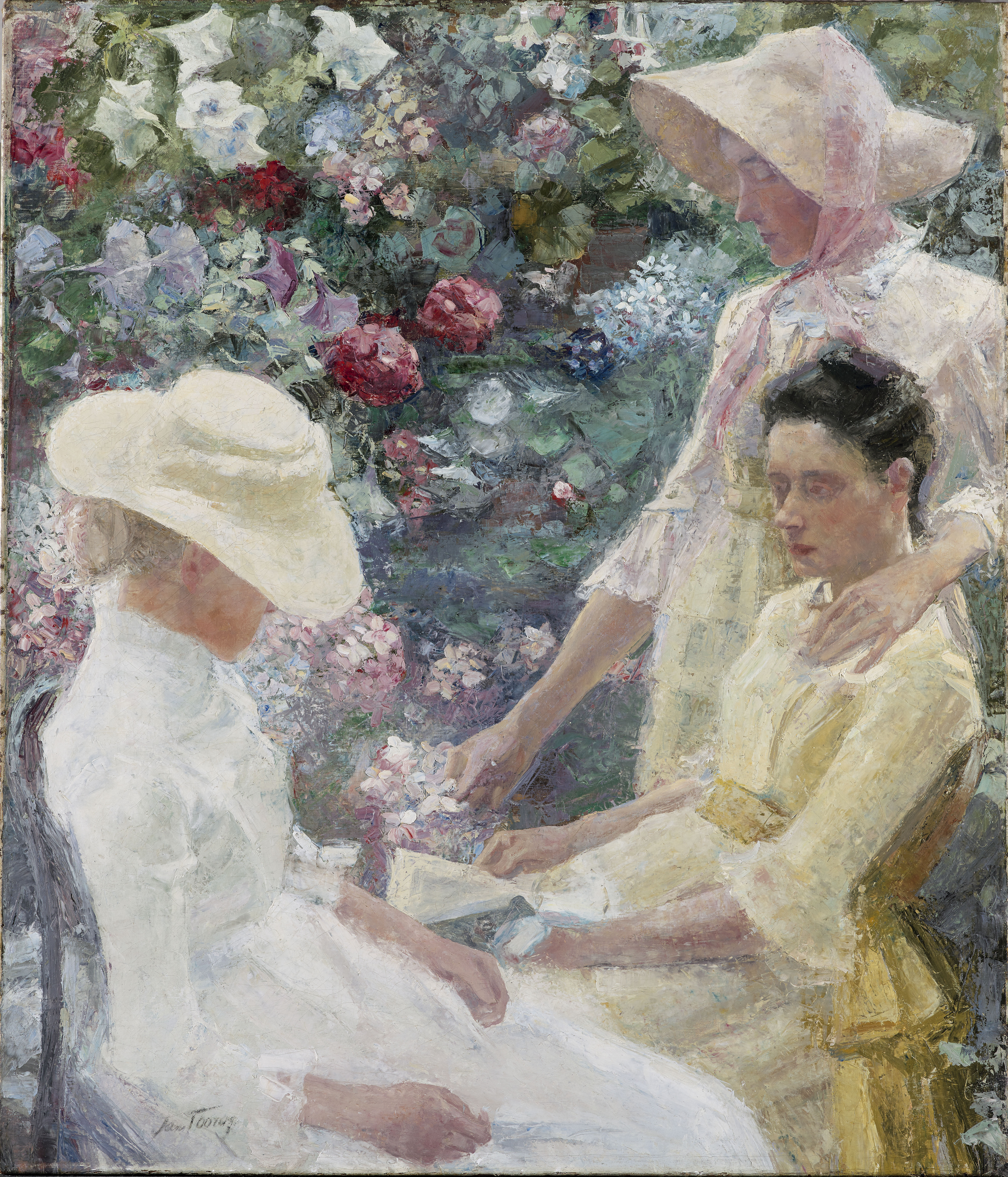
Jan Toorop (date unknown): Flower trio, Private collection

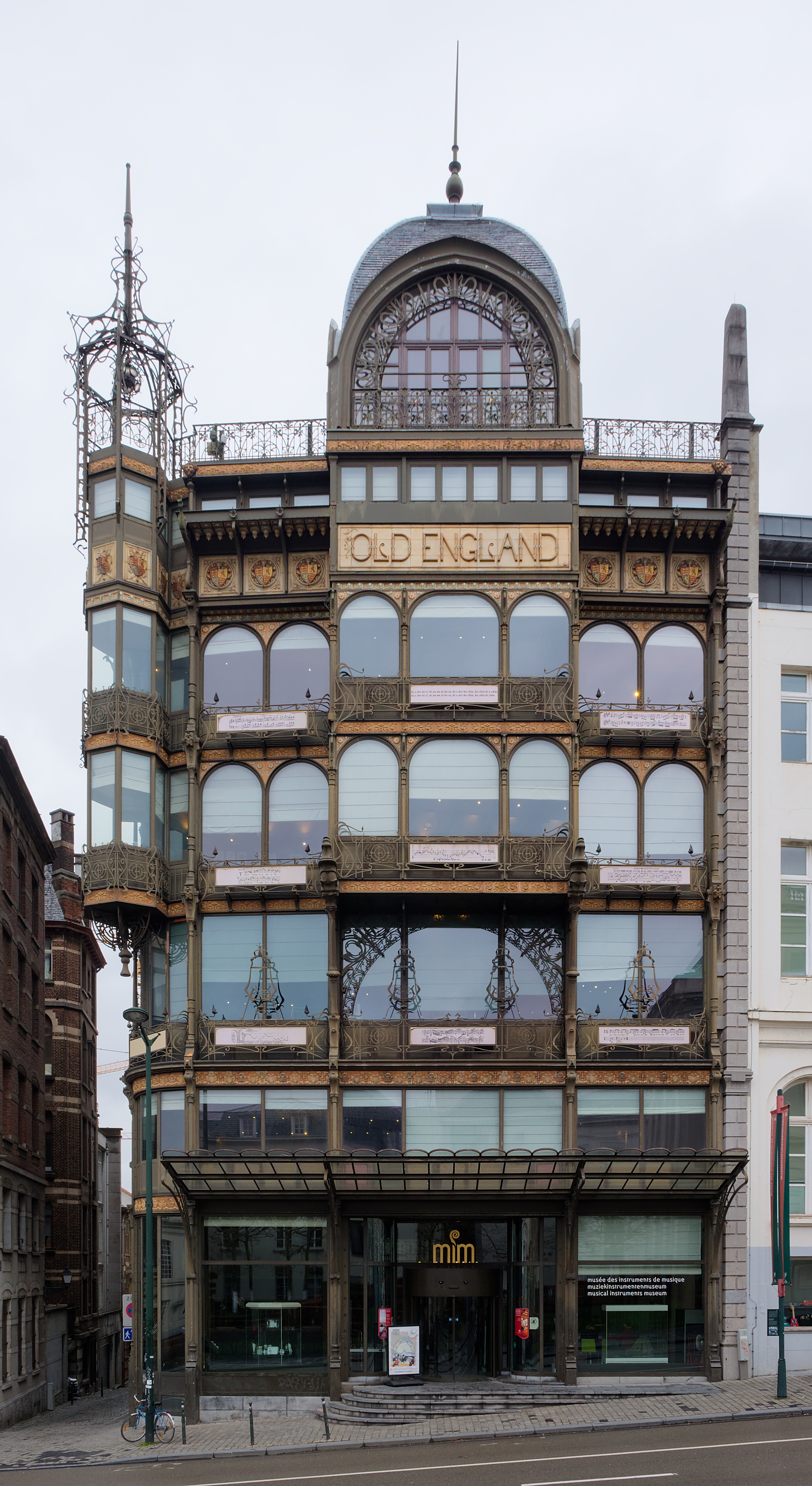
Paul Saintenoy (1898/99): Old England department store, Rue Montagne de la Cour/Hofberg, Brussels

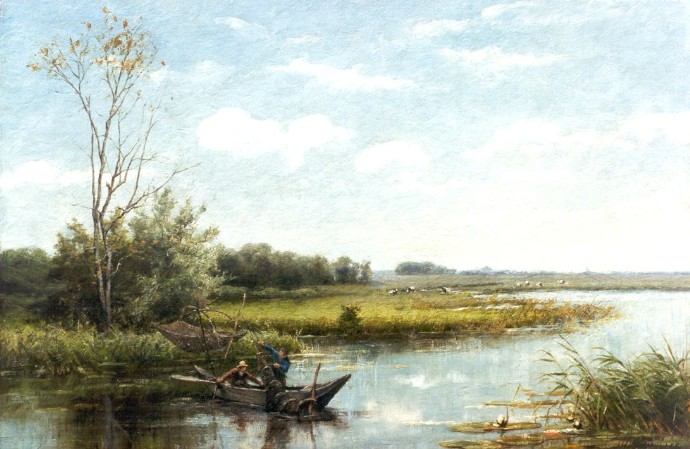
Jan Hillebrand Wijsmuller (1900): Laying of the fishing traps, Private collection

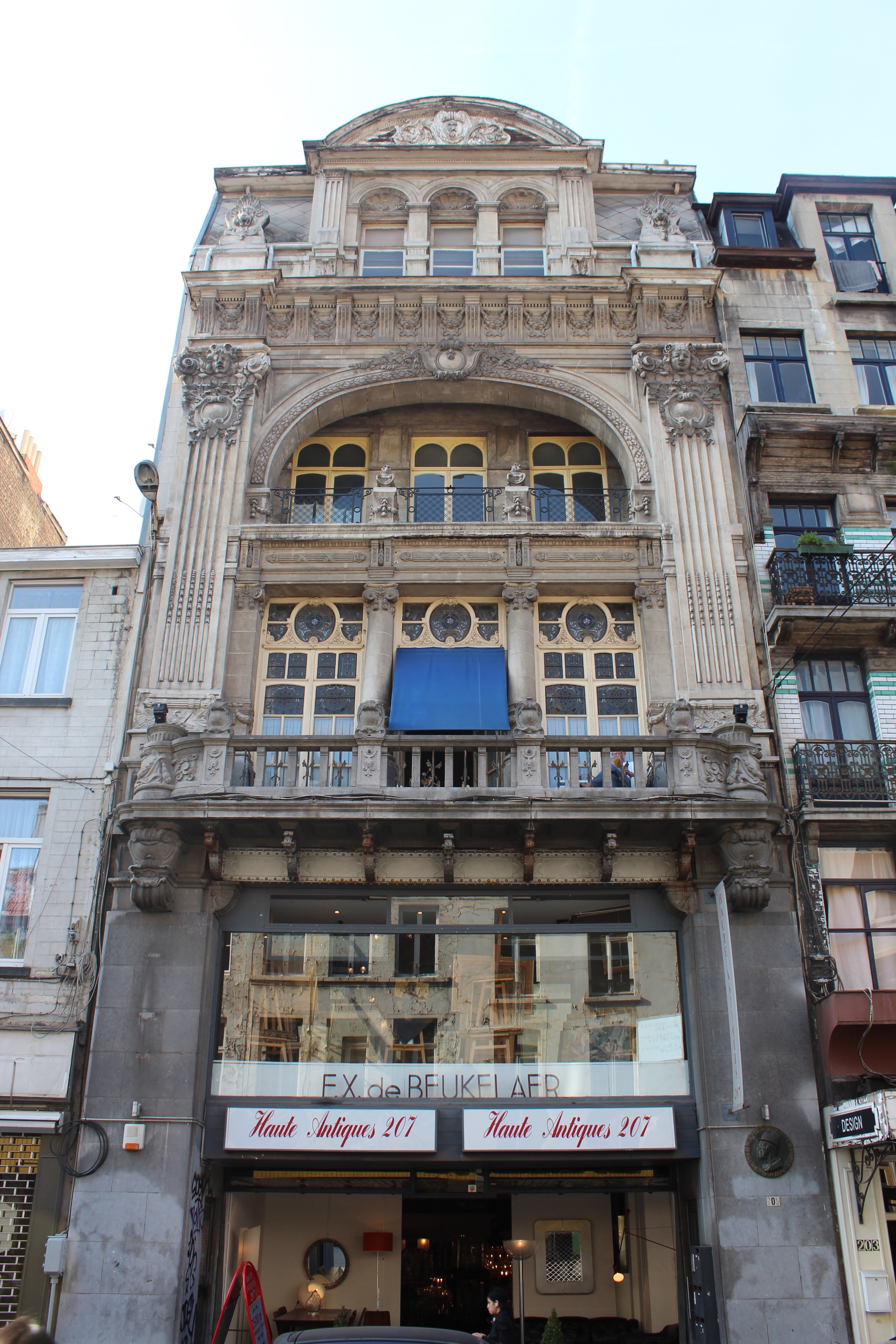
Henri van Massenhove (date unknown): Palais Minerve, former Rialto cinema, Rue Haute/Hoogstraat 205–207, Brussels

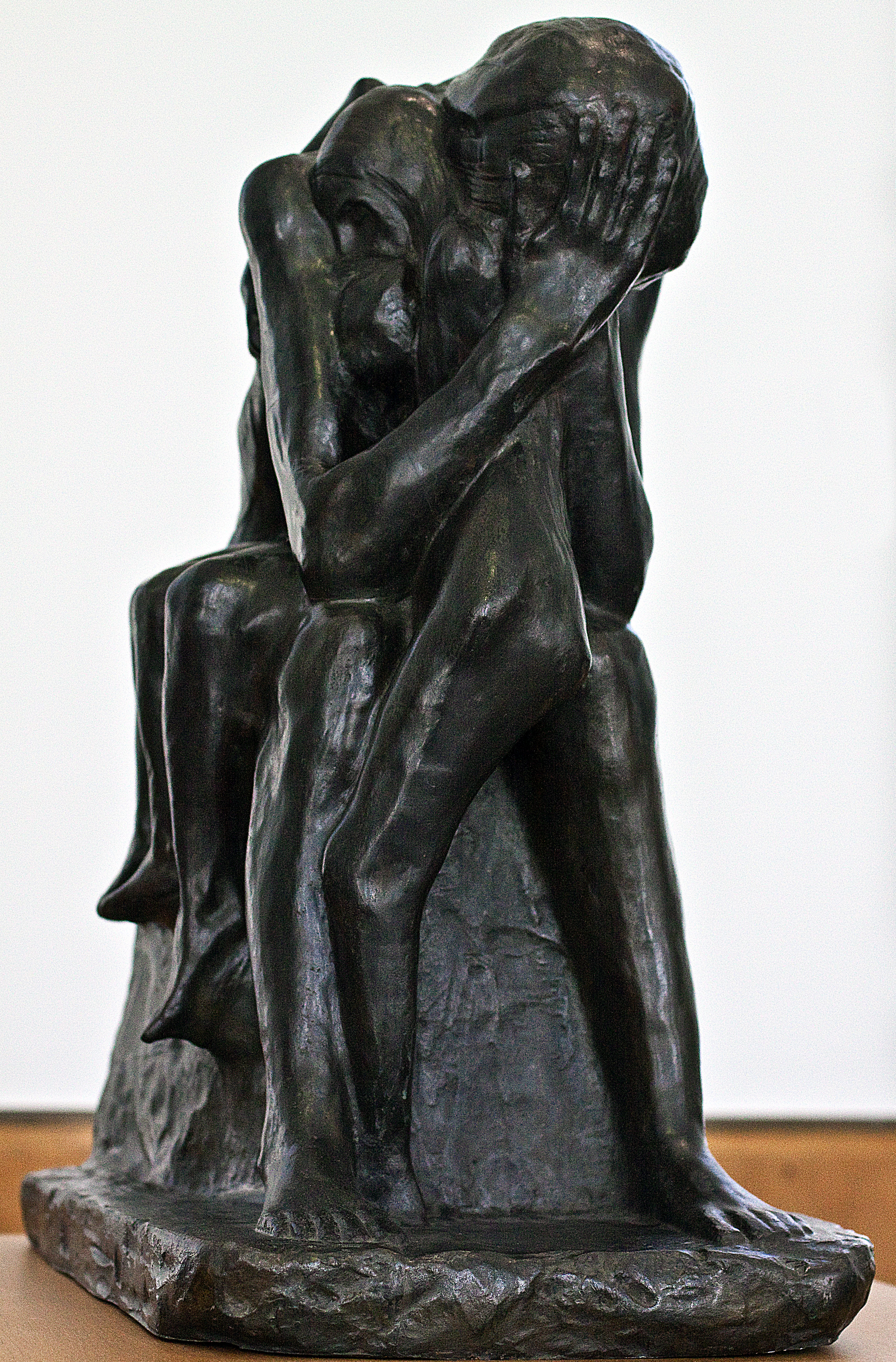
Georges Minne (date unknown): Mother protects her two children, Private collection

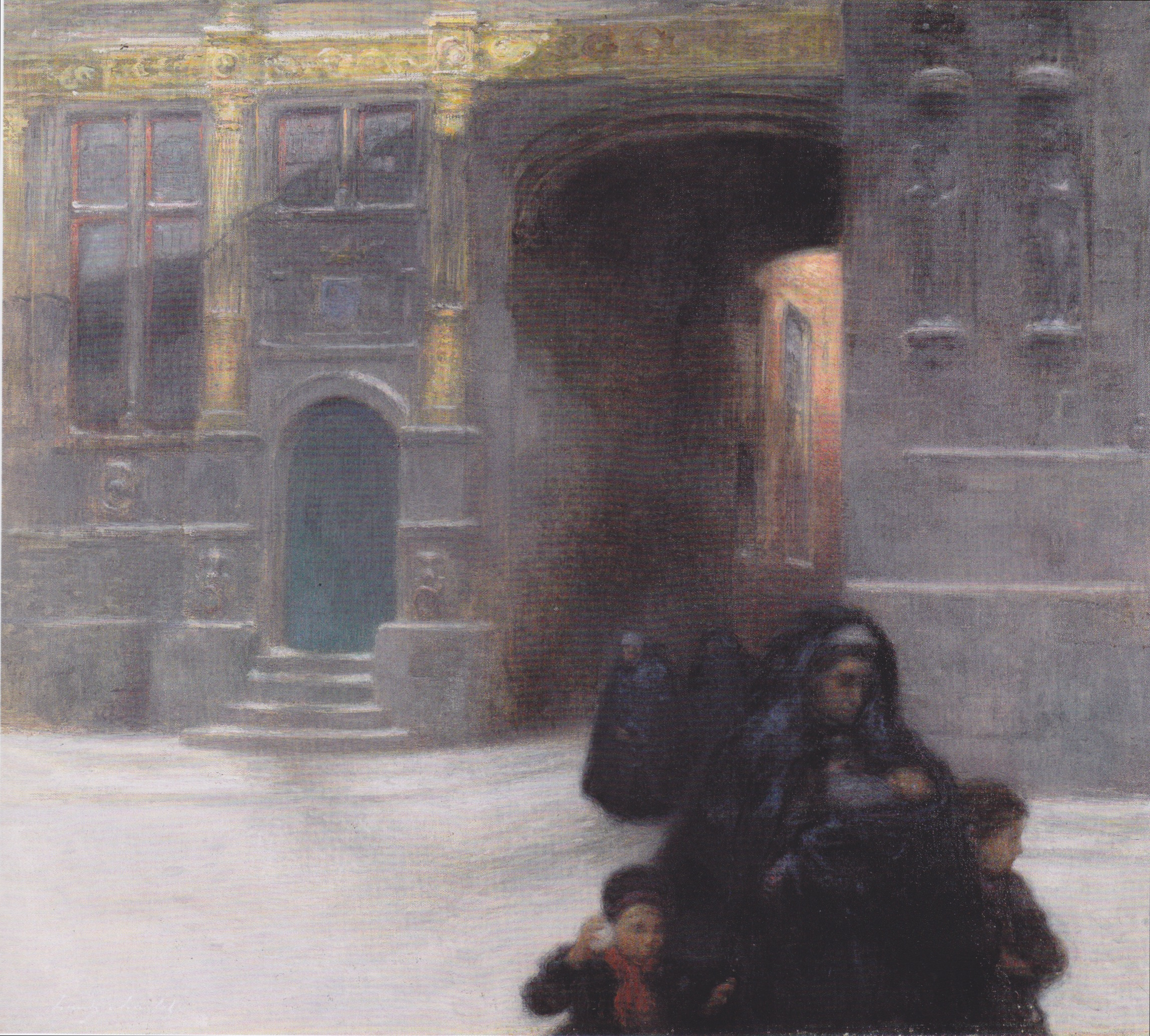
Frantz Charlet (date unknown): The golden houses of Bruges, Museen voor Schone Kunsten, Ghent

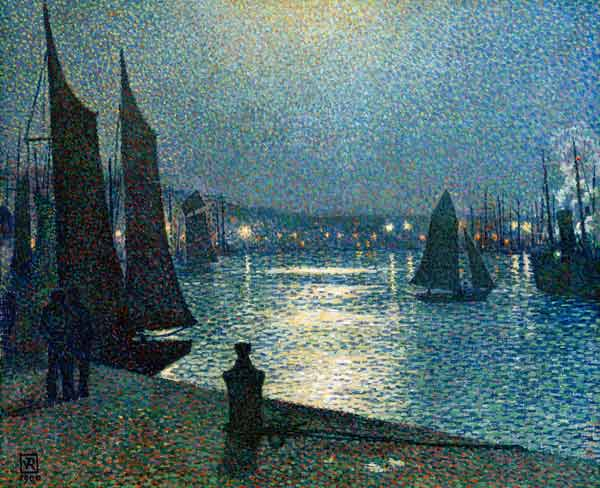
Théo van Rysselberghe (1900): Night with moon in Boulogne, Private collection

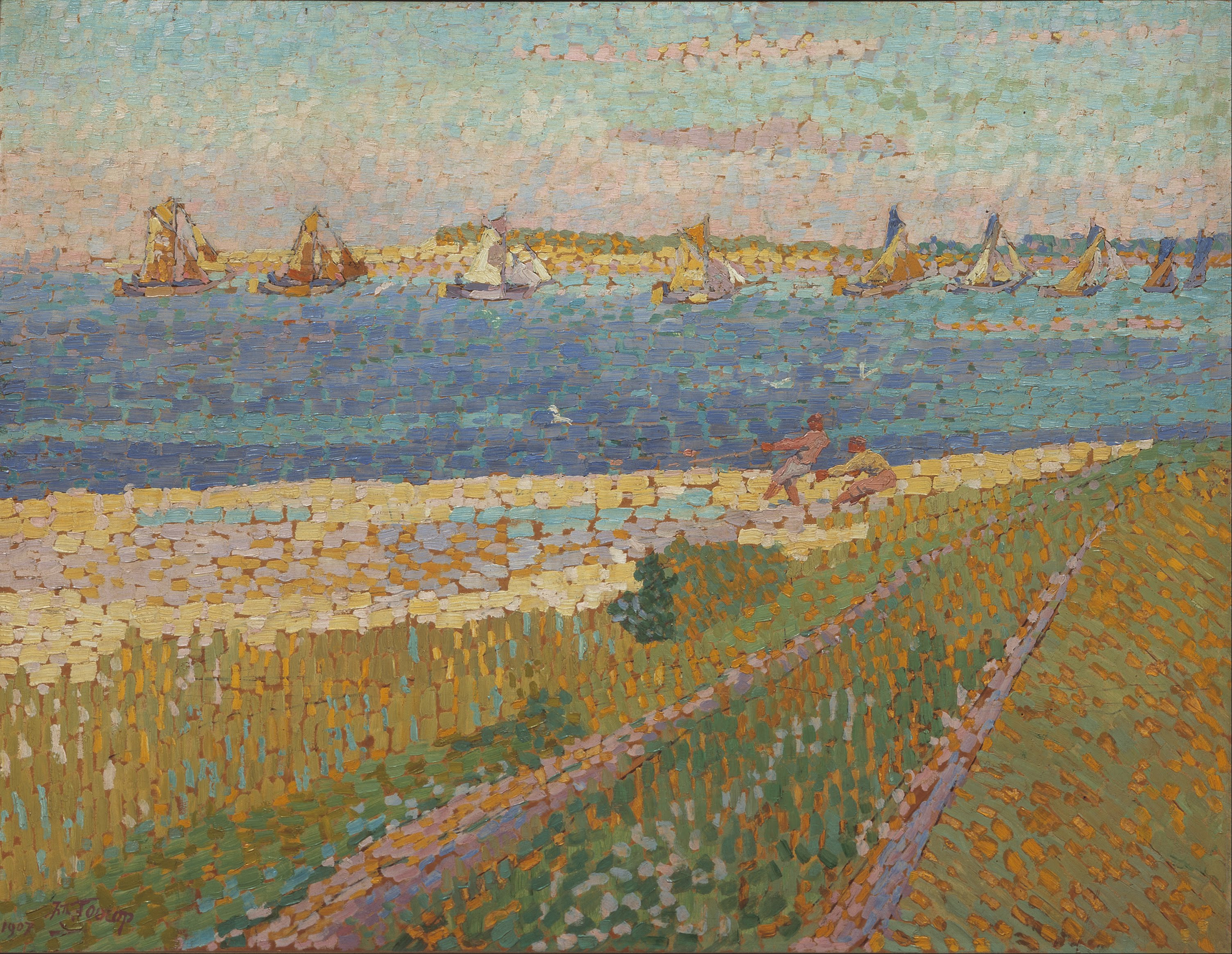
Jan Toorop (1907): The Scheldt near Veere, Central Museum Utrecht

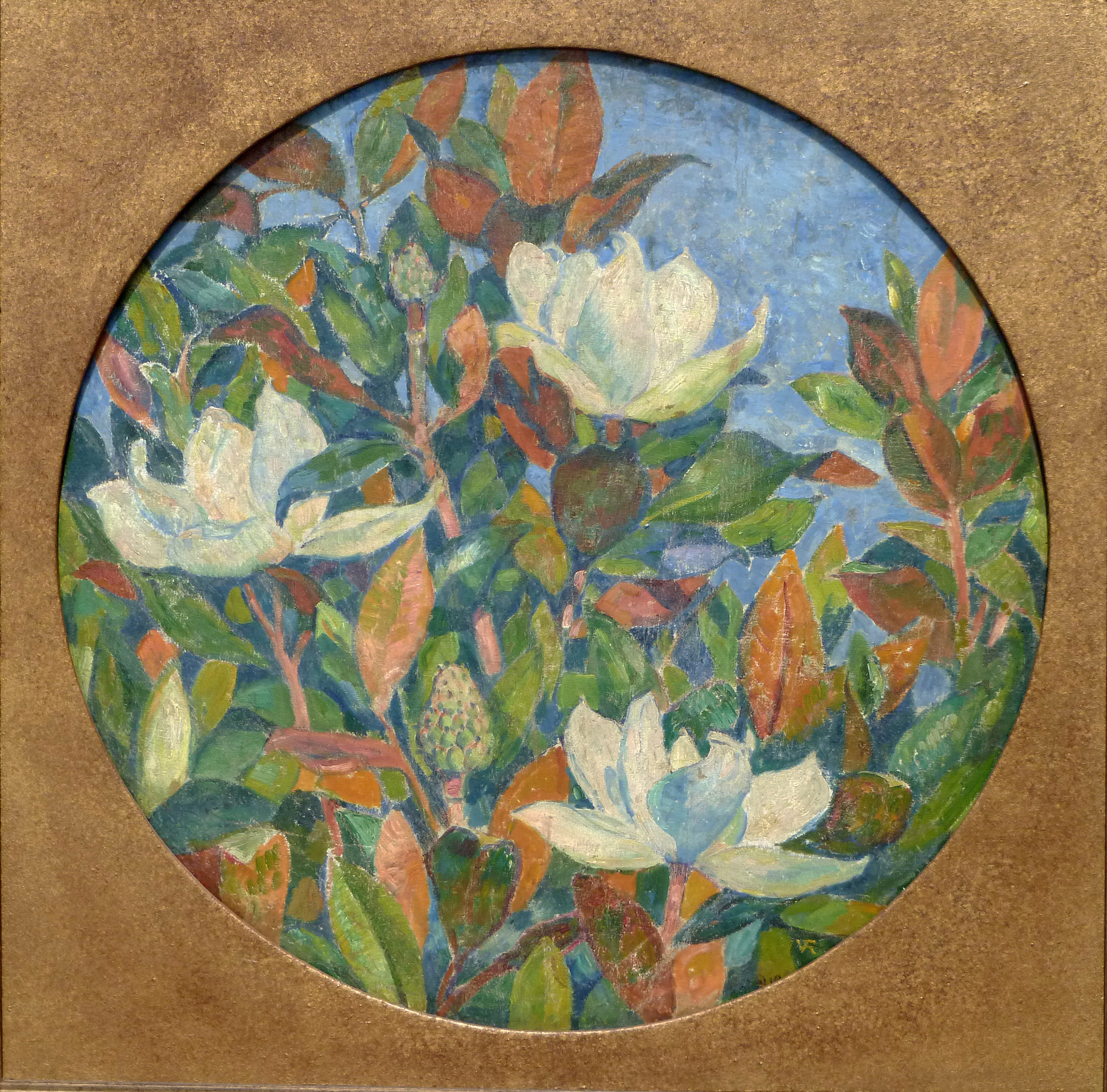
Théo van Rysselberghe (1910): Magnolia, Private collection

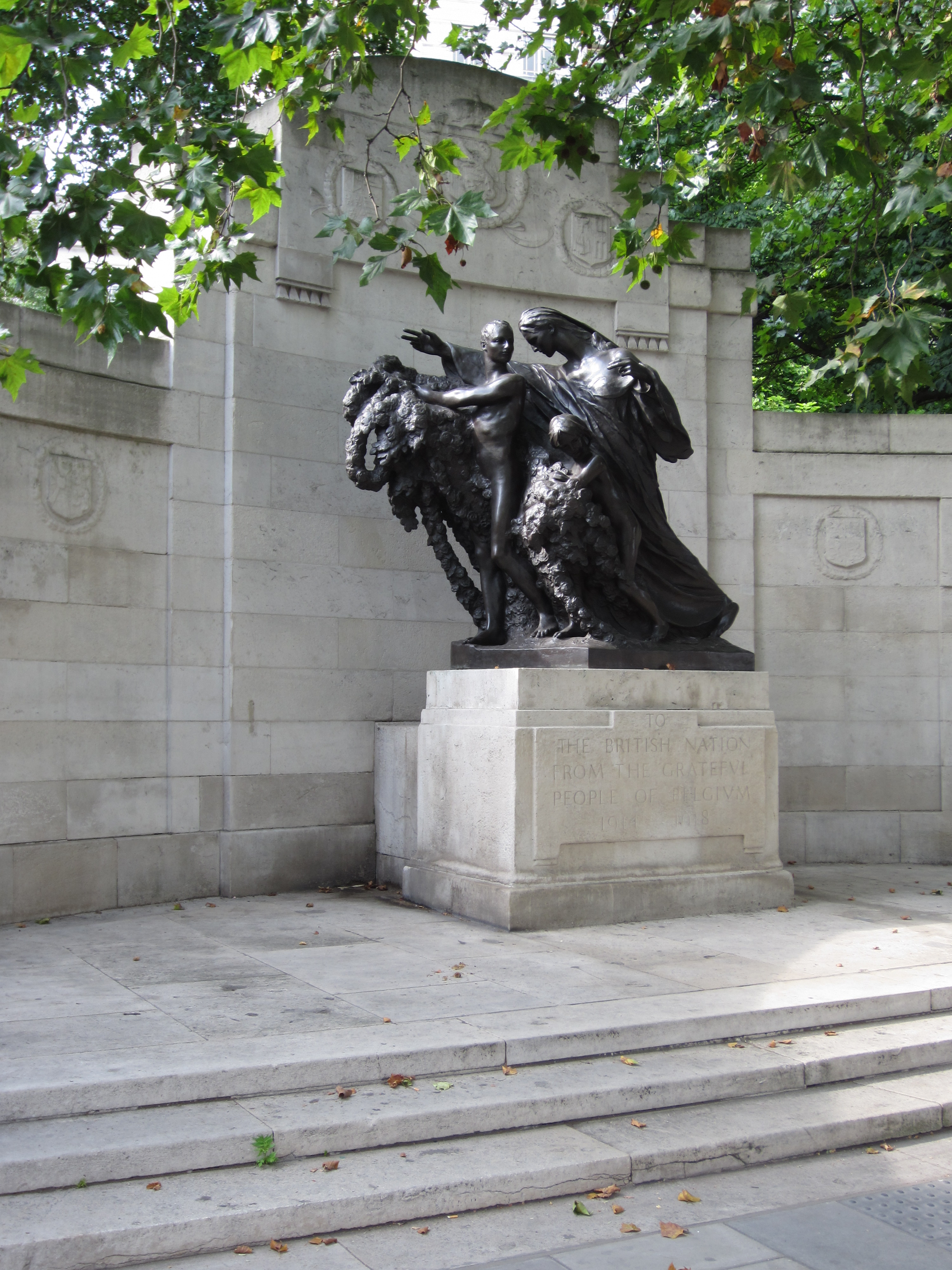
Victor Rousseau (date unknown): Anglo-Belgian Warrior Memorial, London

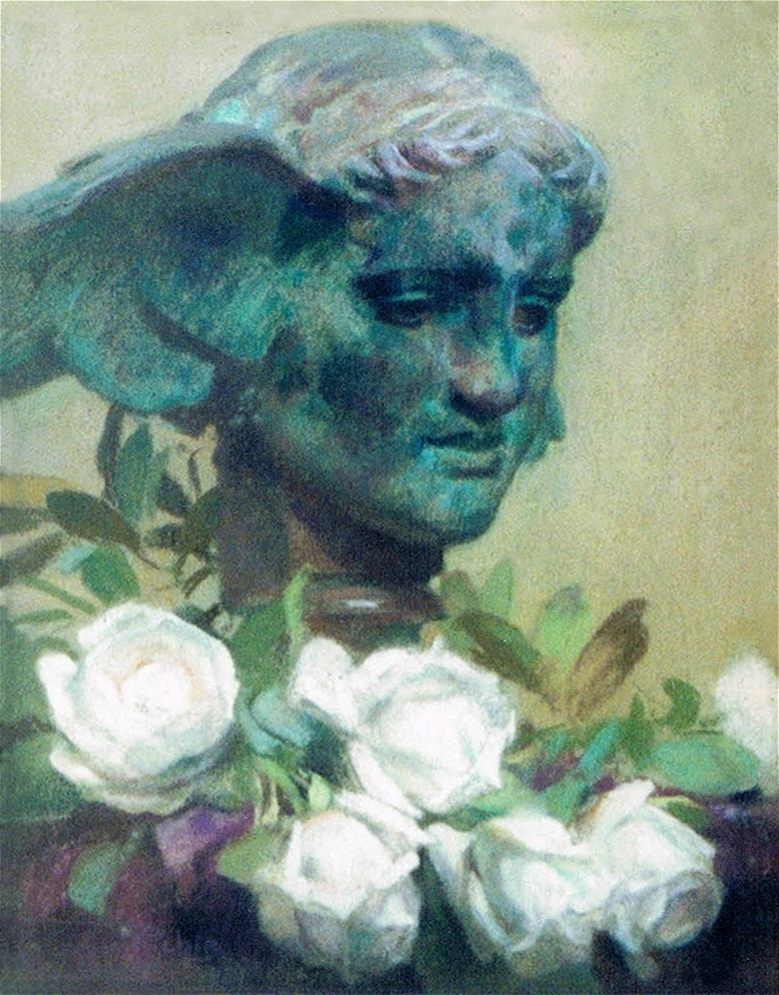
Herman Richir (1913): Virtue of art, Private collection

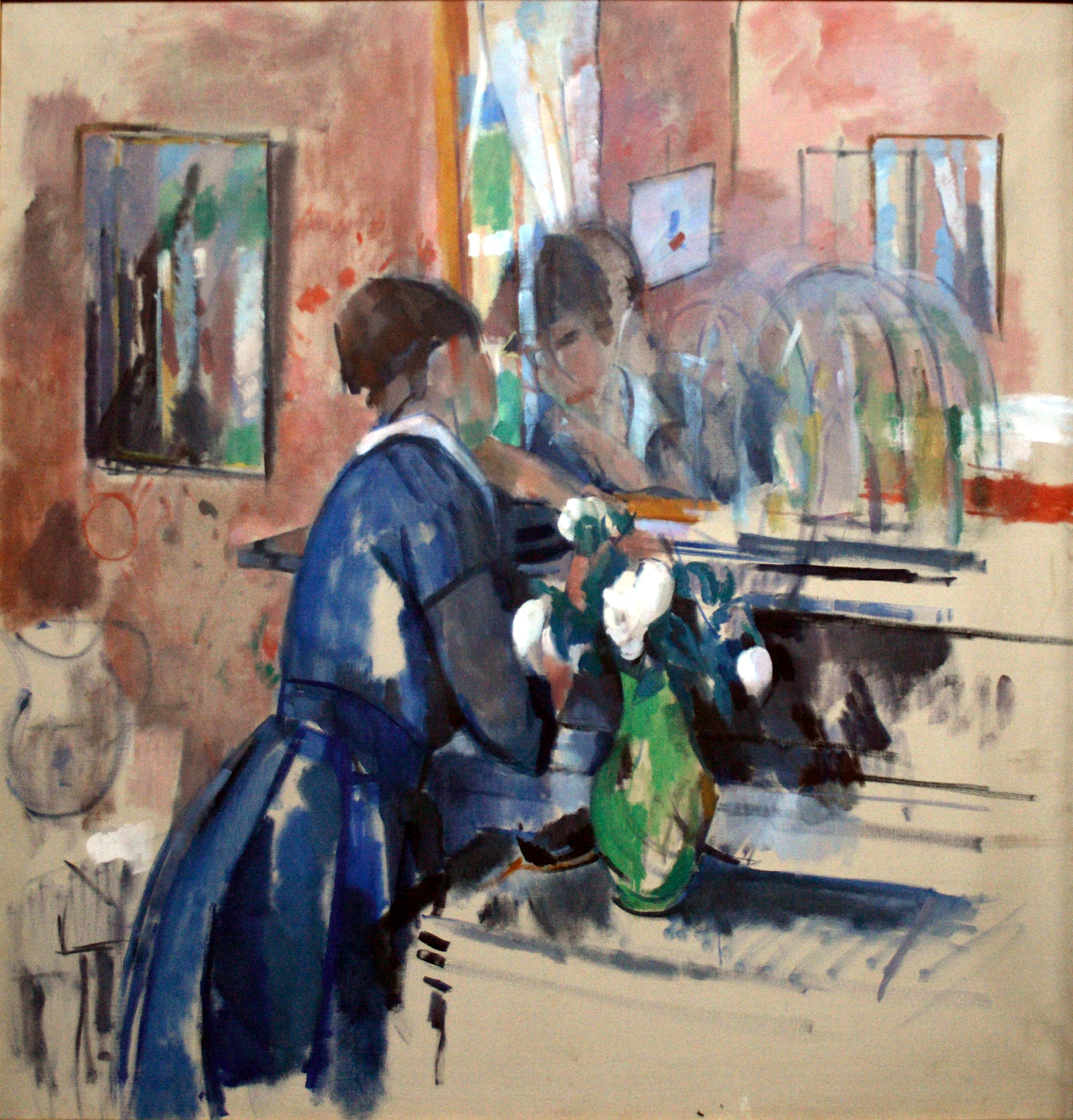
Rik Wouters (1914): Lady in blue before the mirror, Private collection

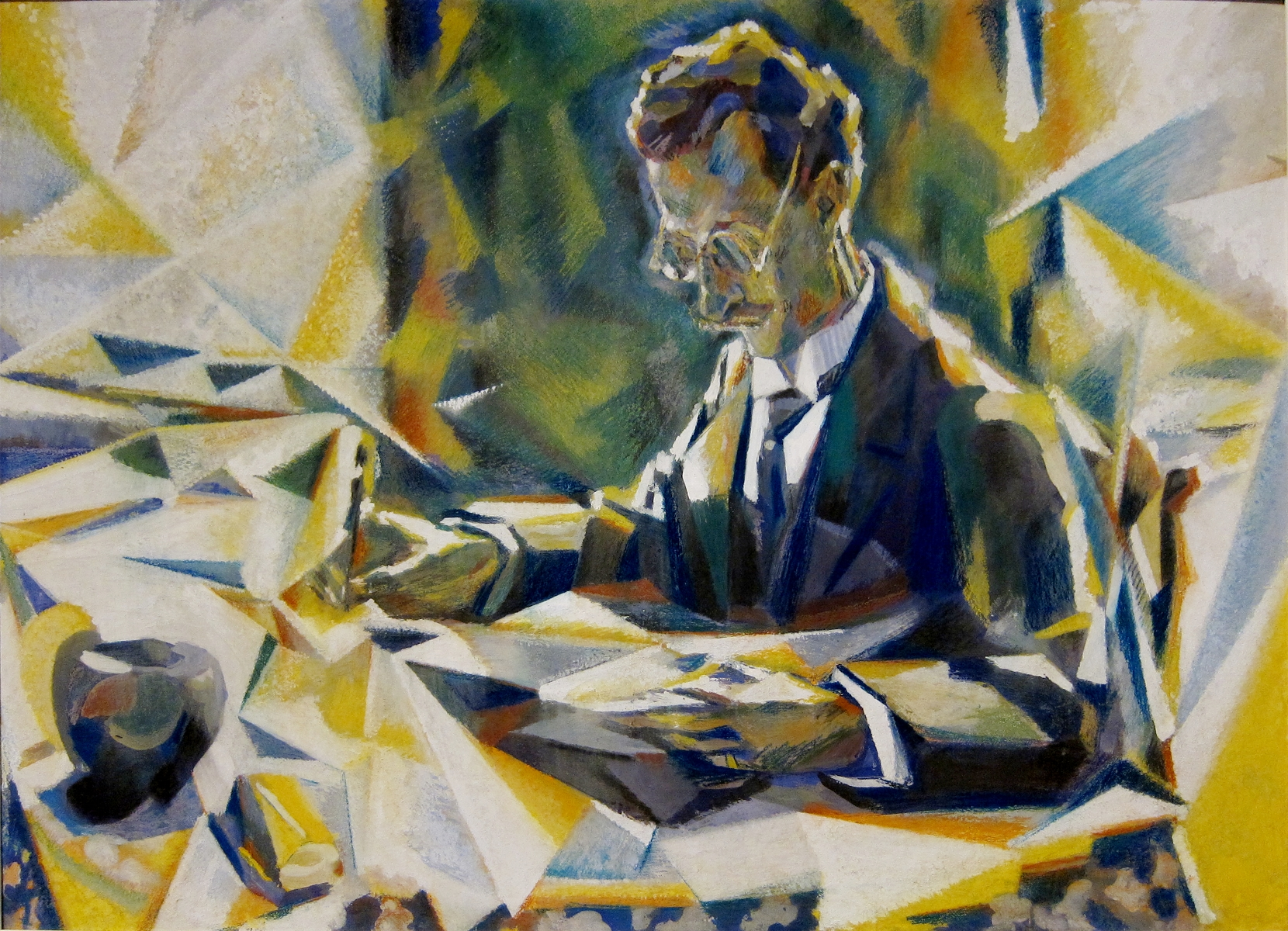
Jules Schmalzigaud (1917): Portrait of Baron Francis Delbeke, Royal Museum of Fine Arts of Belgium, Brussels

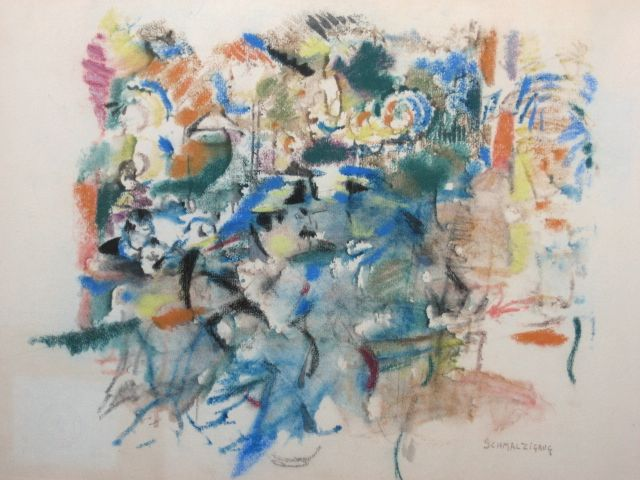
Jules Schmalzigaud (1915/17): Terrace, Private collection

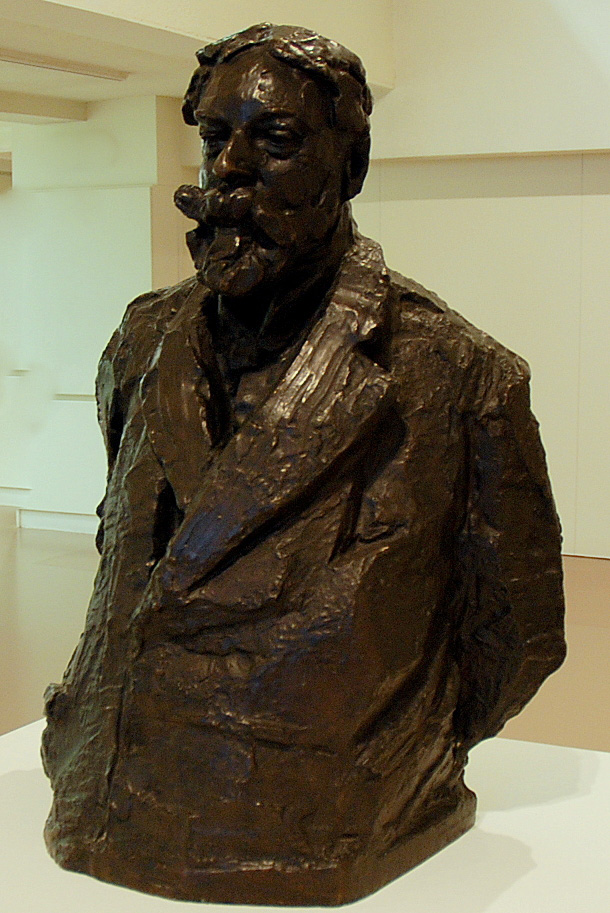
Rik Wouters (date unknown): Portrait bust of the painter James Ensor

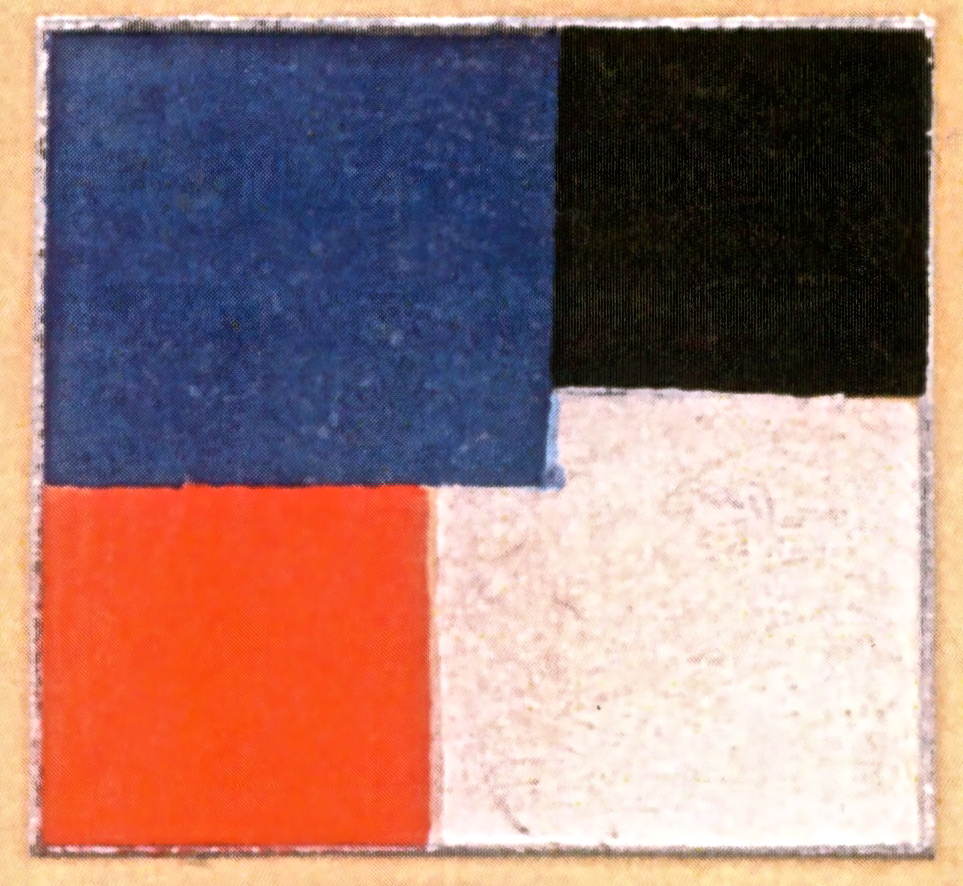
Georges Vantongerloo (1930): Cubist Shield of R-26, Private collection

== Exhibitions ==
- Academie Royale des Beaux-arts et Ecole des Arts decoratifs de Bruxelles. Exposition centennale 1800–1900
- 1987: Académie Royale des Beaux-Arts de Bruxelles, 275 ans d'enseignement, from 07.05 - 28.06.1987
- 2007: Art, anatomie trois siècles d'évolution des représentations du corps, Académie royale des Beaux-arts de Bruxelles, 20.04. - 16.05.2007

== Bibliography ==
- Academie Royale des Beaux-Arts de Bruxelles. 275 ans d'enseignement = 275 jaar onderwijs aan de Koninklijke Academie voor Schone Kunsten van Brussel., Crédit Communal, Brussels, 1987, ISBN 2-87193-030-9
- Academie Royale des Beaux-arts et École des Arts décoratifs de Bruxelles. Exposition centennale 1800–1900
- A. W. Hammacher: Amsterdamsche Impressionisten en hun Kring. J.M. Meulenhoff, Amsterdam, 1946
- Wiepke Loos, Carel van Tuyll van Serooskerken: Waarde Hoer Allebé – Leven en werk van August Allebé (1838–1927). Waanders, Zwolle, 1988, ISBN 90-6630-124-4
- Sheila D. Muller: Dutch Art – An Encyclopedia. Routledge, 2013, ISBN 978-1-135-49574-9
- Jean Bouret: L'École de Barbizon et le paysage française au XIXe siècle. Neuchâtel, 1972
- Georges Pillement: Les Pré-Impressionistes. Zug, 1972, OCLC 473774777
- Nathalia Brodskaya: Impressionismus. Parkstone Books, New York, 2007, ISBN 978-1-85995-652-6
- Norma Broude: Impressionismus. an international movement, 1860–1920 ("World impressionism"). Dumont, Cologne, 2007, ISBN 978-3-8321-7454-5
- Jean-Paul Crespelle: Les Fauves, Origines et Evolution, Office du Livre, Fribourg, und Edition Georg Popp, Würzburg, 1981, ISBN 3-88155-088-7
- Jean Leymarie: Fauvismus, Editions d'Art, Albert Skira Verlag, Geneva, 1959
- Kristian Sotriffer: Expressionismus und Fauvismus. Verlag Anton Schroll & Co., Vienna, 1971
- Jean-Luc Rispail: Les surréalistes. Une génération entre le rêve et l'action (= Découvertes Gallimard. 109). Gallimard, Paris, 2005, ISBN 2-05-053140-0
- David Britt: Modern Art - Impressionism to Post-Modernism. Thames & Hudson, London, 2007, ISBN 978-0-500-23841-7
- Sandro Bocola: Die Kunst der Moderne. Zur Struktur und Dynamik ihrer Entwicklung. Von Goya bis Beuys. Prestel, Munich/New York, 1994, ISBN 3-7913-1889-6. (Neuauflage im Psychosozial-Verlag, Gießen, Lahn 2013, ISBN 978-3-8379-2215-8)
- Sam Phillips: Moderne Kunst verstehen - Vom Impressionismus ins 21. Jahrhundert. A. Seemann Henschel, Leipzig, 2013, ISBN 978-3-86502-316-2
- Pierre Daix, Joan Rosselet: Picasso - The Cubist Years 1907–1916., Thames & Hudson, London, 1979, ISBN 0-500-09134-X
- Michael White: De Stijl and Dutch Modernism (= Critical Perspectives in Art History). Manchester University Press, ISBN 0-7190-6162-8
- Thomas, Karin: Blickpunkt der Moderne: Eine Geschichte von der Romantik bis heute. Verlag M. DuMont, Cologne, 2010, ISBN 978-3-8321-9333-1

== Sources ==
- ARBA online history (in French)
- Rijksbureau voor Kunsthistorische Documentatie, The Hague, (RKD Netherlands Institute for Art History), Netherlands (in Dutch and English)
- Royale Museums of fine Arts of Belgium - Brussels Museums
