= Victor Lagye =

Belgian painter and illustrator

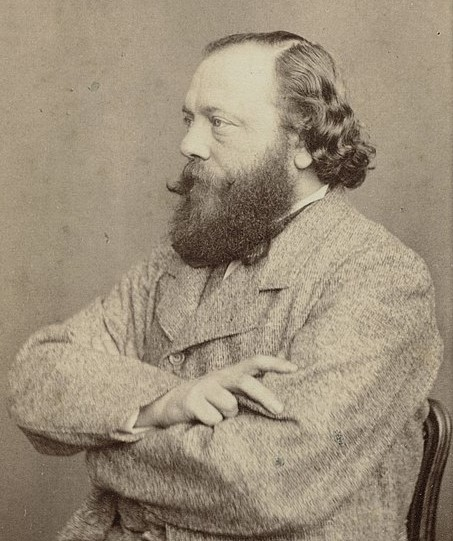
Portrait of Victor Lagye

Victor Lagye (20 June 1825, in Ghent – 2 September 1896, in Antwerp) was a Belgian painter and illustrator best known for his genre paintings and history scenes. He participated in various decorative programs commissioned by the Belgian government. In his later years he was active in art education.

== Life ==
Victor Lagye studied at the Ghent Academy, where one of his teachers was Théodore-Joseph Canneel. He won the Prix de Rome in 1843. The prize allowed him to travel to Italy. At the time, Italy was in turmoil. According to some sources he was a member of the 'university bataillon' under the command of Charles Albert of Sardinia and afterwards acted as volunteer in Garibaldi's Army during the revolt in Rome at the end of 1848, which led to the foundation of the Roman Republic. When the French retook Rome Lagye escaped to avoid a death sentence. The artist went first to Brussels in 1849 and in 1850 he moved to Antwerp.

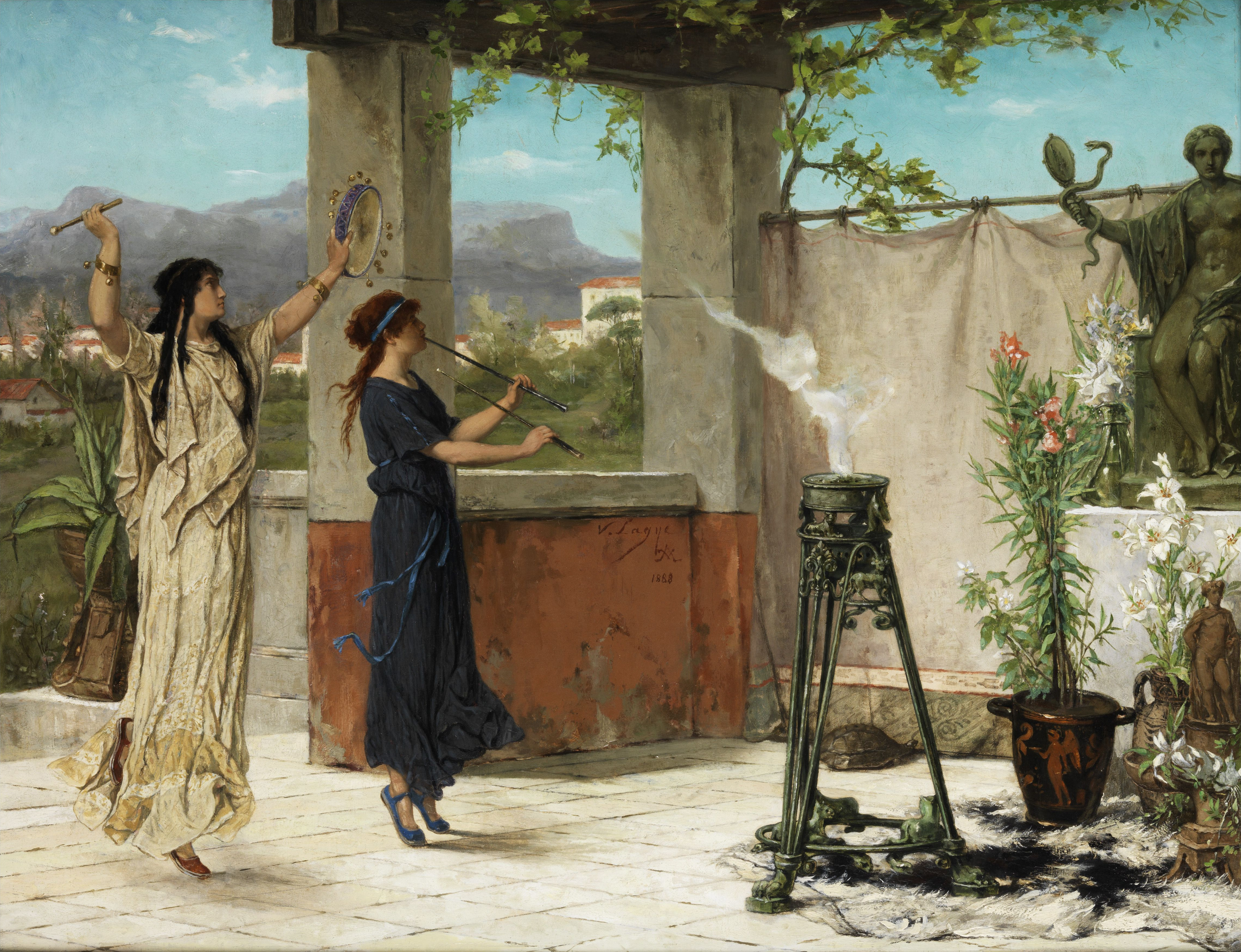
Dancers in the temple

In Antwerp he forged a friendship with Jan August Hendrik Leys. Leys was a leading representative of the historical or Romantic school and a pioneer of the Realist movement in Belgium. Leys had distanced himself from the pathos and historical anecdotes of the Romantic school and the Rubens' influenced style of de Keyser. Instead, Leys had begun painting scenes set in 16th-century Antwerp, combining details studied from life with a deliberately archaising style reminiscent of 15th and 16th-century Flemish and German painting. Lagye became an enthusiastic and devoted disciple of Leys and started to paint the same subjects as Leys.

From the mid-1850s the Belgian government commenced to promote monumental art in Belgium. It provided financial assistance to artists on various projects. The artists Jean Baptiste van Eycken and Jean-François Portaels, both pupils of François-Joseph Navez, were the two artists who had launched the monumentalist movement. It was then taken up by artists such as Jan Swerts and Godfried Guffens who had learned about the movement in Germany. The promotion of monumental art dealing with episodes from the Belgian national history was regarded by the government of the young Belgian state as an important means of creating a national identity. The Belgian prime minister Charles Rogier was in particular in support of this movement.

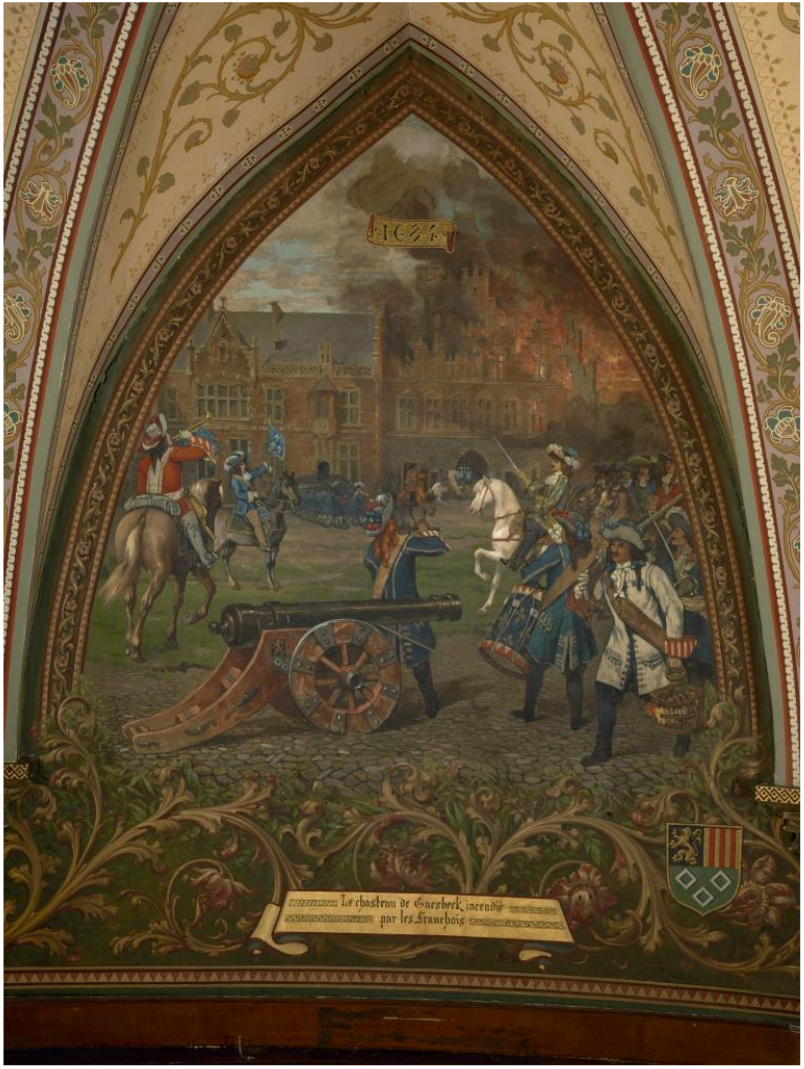
The burning of Gaasbeek by the French

Lagye was able to obtain various public commissions for monumental decorations in churches and public buildings. He also lobbied the Belgian government for funds for these projects. He worked around 1850 with Jean-François Portaels on 20 murals in the chapel of the Brothers of the Christian Doctrine in Brussels. The artists used a new process, which is referred to as 'water-glass painting'. Water-glass painting is a technique of mural painting, intended to resist the effects of damp and pollution, that was invented and popular in the 19th century. It is a form of fresco painting. In 1855 he collaborated with Lucas Victor Schaefels on the decorations in the St Anthony Church in Antwerp. The artists again used the water-glass painting process. Lagye also worked in 1859 on decorations in Gaasbeek Castle depicting various episodes from Belgian history such as The burning of Gaasbeek by the French.

Lagye further worked on decorative projects on the occasion of various national celebrations. For the national celebrations of 1856 he produced a large canvas depicting the Apotheosis of the Queen for the triumphal arch. For the celebrations on the occasion of the 50th anniversary of the founding of the Belgian state, Lagye designed the floats for the parade in Brussels together with Joseph Gerard and Gustaaf den Duyts.

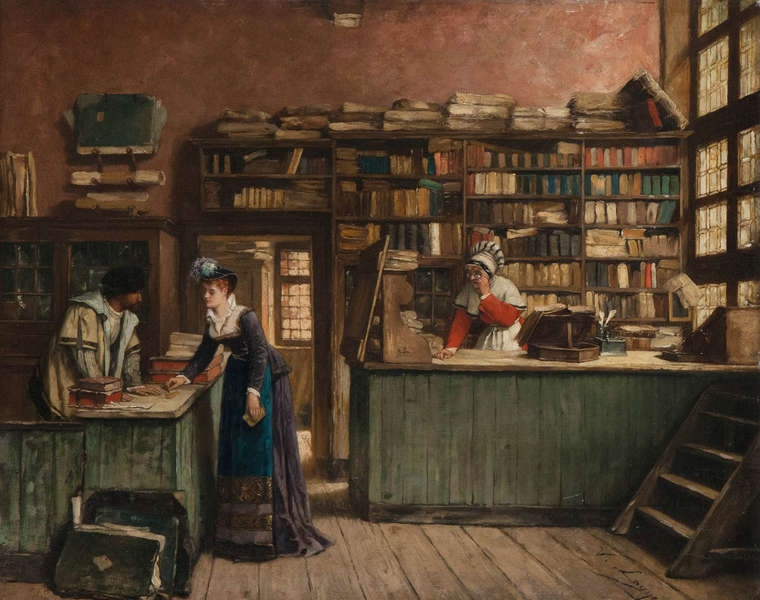
Visiting the lawyer

He designed the title pages and illustrations for several Flemish authors. He also designed the illustrations for an edition of the Belgian Constitution published in 1852. In the edition the text of the constitution was surrounded by ornamented frames. Key provisions were illustrated outside of the text with 12 plates made from wood block engravings, which were carved by the engravers Henri Brown, William Brown, Charles Ligny, E. Vermorcken and Adolphe-Francois Pannemacker. Lagye designed the figures, frames, armorial bearings and seals.

In 1861 the Belgian state made a deal with the management (de Kerkfabriek) of the St Bavo's Cathedral in Ghent. Pursuant to the deal the Kerkfabriek sold the Adam and Eve of the Ghent Altarpiece of Jan and Hubert van Eyck to the Royal Museums of Fine Arts of Belgium and in return, the Kerkfabriek received: (1) 50,000 Belgian Francs for the glass windows in the cathedral choir; (2) the copies of the side panels painted by Michiel Coxie in the 16th century, and (3) a state stipend to pay a painter to produce copies of Adam and Eve tailored to the good taste and customs of the time. Victor Lagye received the commission to paint the 'decent' versions of Adam and Eve. He made copies with Adam and Eve no longer nude as in the original, but with clothes. He commenced his work on these panels in 1861 and completed them the next year. The panels were attached to the Ghent Altarpiece in the St Bavo's Cathedral. In 1921 the panels were detached again and replaced by the originals which had returned from Germany after the First World War. Lagye's panels are still hung elsewhere in the St Bavo's Cathedral.

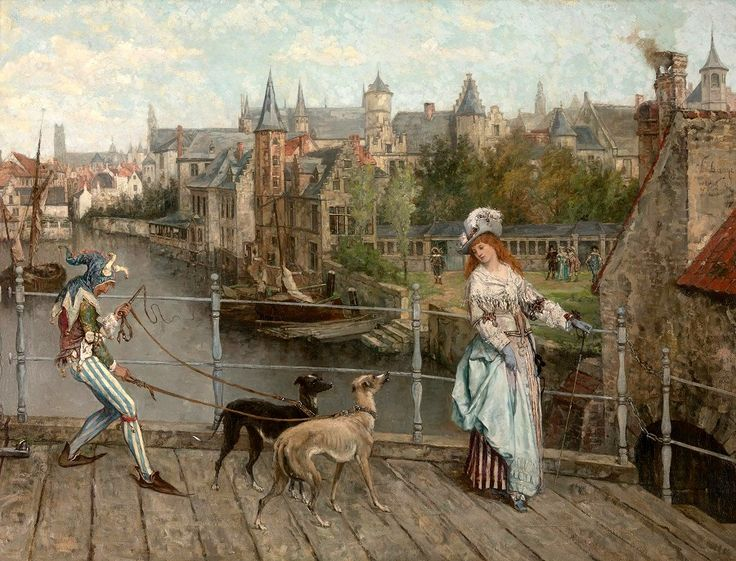
Carnival in Bruges

Around 1890, the city of Antwerp commissioned Lagye with the decoration of the wedding hall in the City Hall. Lagye created a cycle of six frescos depicting the history of marriage in Belgium regions: one Old Roman, a Christian, a barbarian, a Medieval, a royal wedding and a republican wedding.

Victor Lagye played a role in launching the international career of Lawrence Alma-Tadema when he introduced Lawrence Alma-Tadema to the Flemish art dealer Gambart who was active in London. He gave Gambart's coachman the wrong address so that Gambart visited Lawrence Alma-Tadema's studio and impressed by the work he saw there Gambart agreed to represent Lawrence Alma-Tadema.

Lagye became a professor at the Higher Institute of Fine Arts in Antwerp in 1871 and was promoted to the director of that institution in 1895. His pupils included Albrecht De Vriendt.

Lagye won during his career several distinctions: a Medal at the Centennial Exposition in Philadelphia of 1876, Chevalier of the Order of Leopold and a gold medal at the salon in Brussels in 1860.

Lagye died on 2 September 1896 in Antwerp.

== Work ==
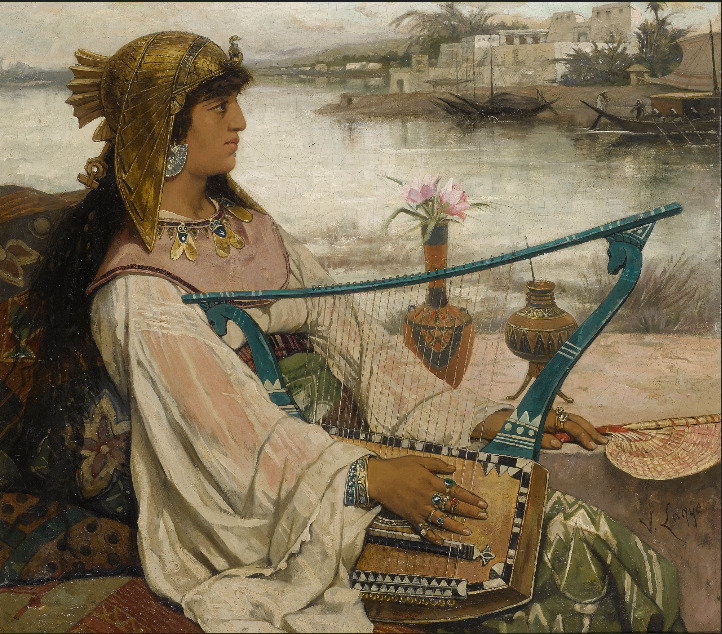
The lyre

Victor Lagye was a painter whose main subject matter was portraits and genre paintings. He started as a typical representative of the late-Romantic style as developed in Belgium by pupils and teachers of the Antwerp Academy. In particular, the influence of Lagye's teacher Henri Leys remained paramount at the academy throughout the second half of the 19th century in style as well as subject matter. The teachers at the academy encouraged their students to study the antique, draw precisely and stick to the sober and somber palette typical of 19th century academic painting.

Lagye became an enthusiastic and devoted disciple of Leys and started to paint subjects similar to the subjects favored by Leys and Leys' pupils such as Eugène Siberdt. His subject included genre scenes often of a sentimental nature set in the 16th and 17th century such as A maiden feeding squirrels, stories from the glorious national history such as The girlfriend of Emperor Charles V at the cradle of her child and stories from Goethe's Faust. He also often depicted Roma women. Lagye was criticized by some art historians for being a slavish follower of Leys but with less imagination and technical skill. He initially used the sober color palette favored by Leys. He later abandoned Leys' themes in search of a warmer, more modern range, often more daring in its presentation.

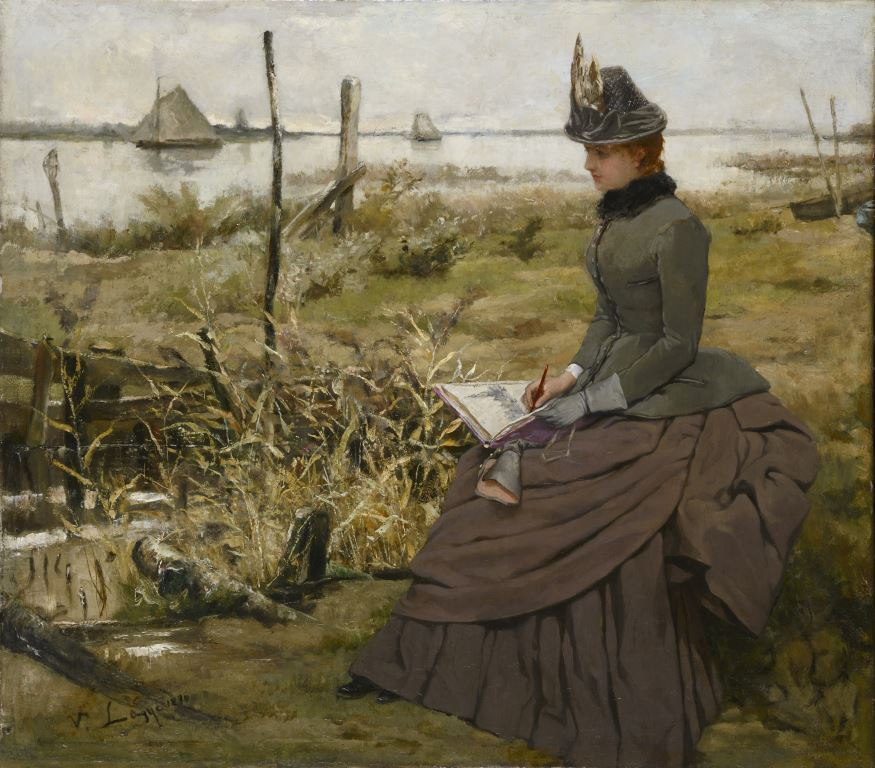
Draughtswoman at the banks of the Scheldt

Lagye also painted some portraits of fashionable women such as the Young woman resting on a park bench (Hôtel de Ventes Horta Brussels auction of February 2018 lot 213).

Lagye also flirted with Orientalism and created various compositions depicting scenes from old Egypt such as The lyre (Sotheby's New York auction of 1 February 2018 lot 863).

Eugène Verboeckhoven filled out some of his pictures.
