= Albrecht De Vriendt =

Belgian painter, author, publisher, copyist, watercolorist and etcher

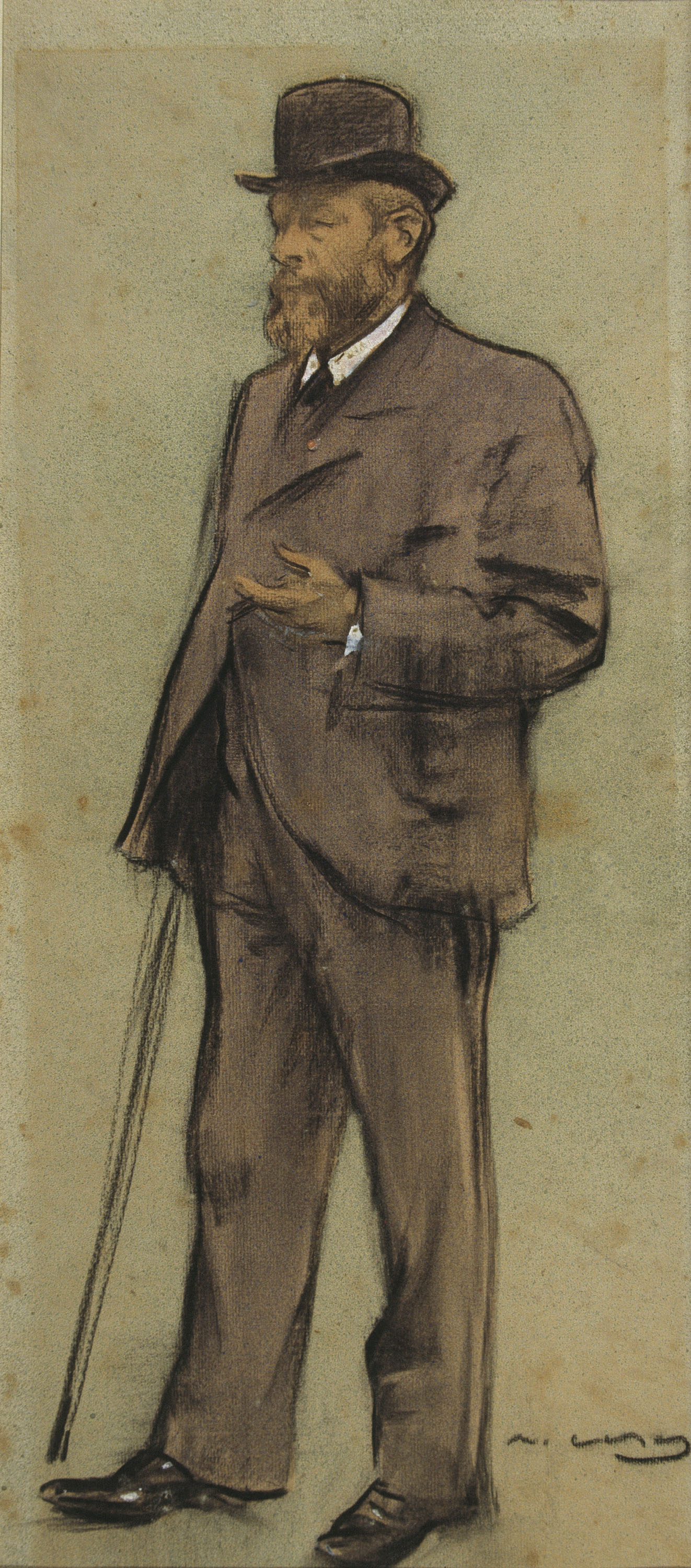
- Portrait of Albrecht de Vriendt by Ramon Casas
- Born: Albrecht De Vriendt; 8 December 1843
- Died: 14 October 1900 (aged 56)
- Occupation: Painter
- Spouse: Laure Fiévé
- Parent(s): Jan Bernard (Jean) de Vriendt and Anna Rosalia Ghiert.
- Relatives: 5 children Juliaan De Vriendt (brother) Clementine De Vriendt (sister)

Albrecht Frans Lieven De Vriendt or Albrecht De Vriendt (In French-language publications referred to as Albert De Vriendt or Albert François Lieven De Vriendt) (Ghent, 8 December 1843 – Antwerp, 14 October 1900) was a Belgian painter known for his genre scenes, history paintings, interiors and figure paintings. He was also active as an author, publisher and copyist. He was also a watercolourist and an etcher. He participated in the monumentalist movement in Belgium and continued the tradition of the Belgian Romantic-historical school long after it had been abandoned in his country and abroad. He was the brother of the painter Juliaan De Vriendt with whom he often collaborated on decorative projects. He was a director of the Royal Academy of Fine Arts of Antwerp.

== Life ==
Albrecht De Vriendt was the son of decorative painter Jan Bernard (Jean) de Vriendt (1809–1868) and Anna Rosalia Ghiert. His father was a decorative painter mainly known for landscapes and still lifes. Albrecht's two-year older brother Juliaan De Vriendt and three-year older sister Clementine De Vriendt also became painters. He and his siblings were initially trained by their father, who conveyed his interest in Flemish art and language to his children. From an early age, he assisted his father in some of his decorative projects. From 1861, he exhibited some of his early works. In 1865, he moved to Antwerp, where his brother was already living. Here he studied under the painter Victor Lagye. During his time in Antwerp he came under the influence of the pre-eminent history painter of Belgium of that time Jan August Hendrik Leys.

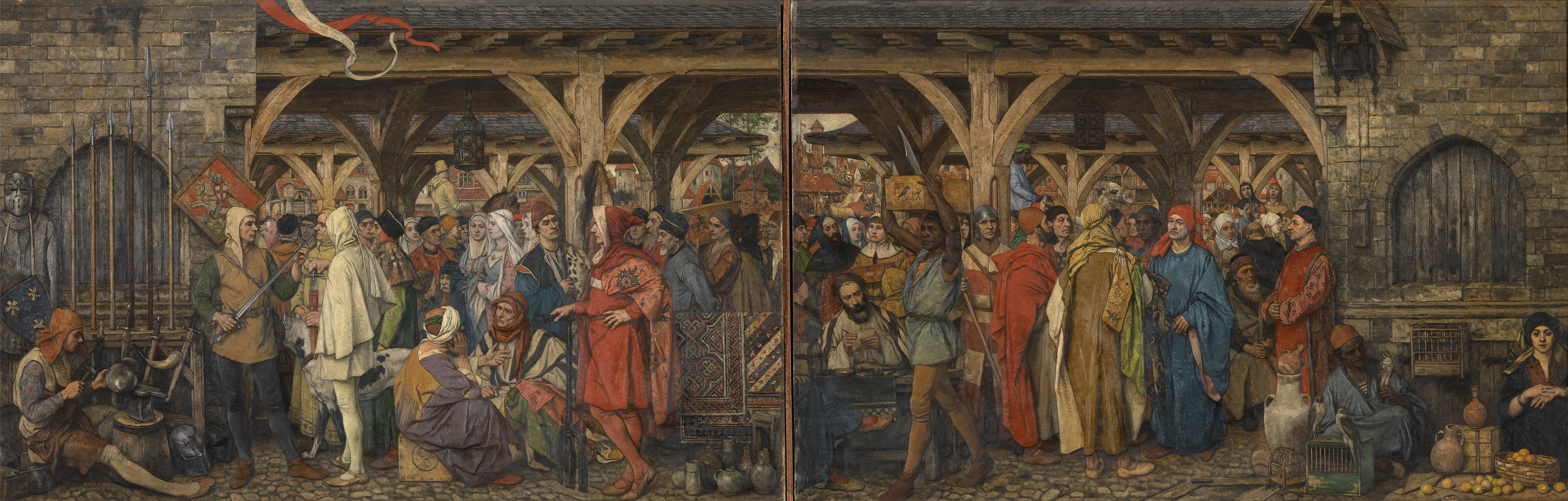
The annual fair

After a brief return to Ghent, Albrecht moved to Brussels, where he settled down. Here, he married in 1880 Laure Fiévé. The couple had five children. With his brother Juliaan, he made a number of journeys. In 1869, they visited Germany. In 1880, Albrecht travelled to Italy. That same year, the brothers journeyed through Egypt and Palestine. Numerous studies, watercolours, and pastel drawings of all kinds and sizes, as well as a faithfully executed and a jointly executed panorama, entitled The Death of Christ, were the fruits of this journey.

In the meantime, Albrecht's artistic reputation grew. The artist was a member of various academies and societies. He also received several honours. His works were acquired by museums in Belgium and abroad. In 1894, he was made a commander of the Order of Leopold, a great officer of the Order of Isabella the Catholic and commander of the Order of Merit of Saint Michael. Albrecht was also appointed a member of the provincial commission of the Royal Commission of Monuments, and in that position, he advised on public artistic projects. The brothers Albrecht and Juliaan shared a house in which they both had a studio. This physical closeness likely explains the stylistic similarity between the work of the two brothers.

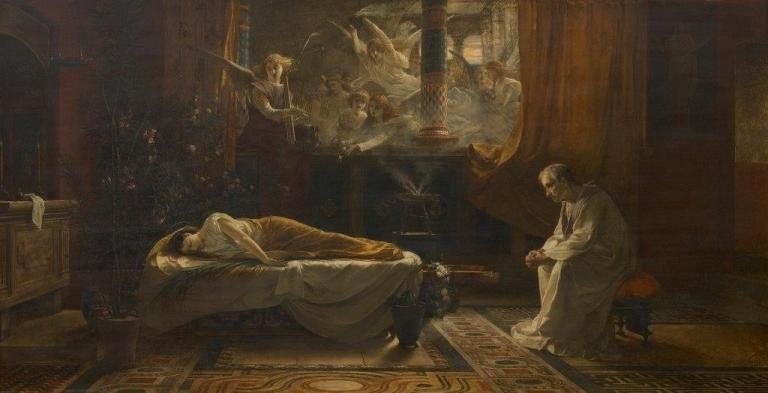
The death wake of St Cecilia

After the death of Charles Verlat, Albrecht De Vriendt was appointed in 1891 as director of the Royal Academy of Fine Arts of Antwerp. In 1894, he was appointed professor of the National Higher Institute for Fine Arts in Antwerp, which had been established in 1885 as a post-graduate program in arts. Albrecht dedicated himself to his academic functions.

From the mid-1850s, the Belgian government began to promote monumental art in Belgium. It provided financial assistance to artists on various projects. The promotion of monumental art dealing with episodes from the Belgian national history was regarded by the government of the young Belgian state as an important means of creating a national identity. The Belgian prime minister Charles Rogier was in particular in support of this movement. Jean-François Portaels and Jean Baptiste van Eycken, both pupils of François-Joseph Navez, helped launch the monumentalism movement in Belgium. They did this by introducing into Belgium new fresco techniques such as water glass painting, which they had studied abroad. The monumentalism movement was subsequently taken up by artists such as Jan Swerts and Godfried Guffens who had learned about the movement in Germany. Albrecht de Vriendt and his brother Juliaan also participated in the monumental art movement. One of the projects they worked on was the decoration of the Gothic room in the town hall of Bruges, a work that, after his death, was completed by his son, Samuel De Vriendt and his brother, Juliaan. In his role as a member of the provincial commission of the Royal Commission of Monuments, he also regularly advised on various projects for the renovation of monuments in Belgium.

When he died in 1900, his brother succeeded him in the position of director of the Antwerp Academy.

Among his students were Pieter Franciscus Dierckx, Frans Mortelmans, Isidoor Opsomer, Jan Brouwer Bogaerts, Willem van Barend Dort (sr.), Albert Geudens, Gerrit David Gratama, Georges Lemmers, Simon Maris, Johan Sikemeier, Piet Slager (jr.), Julien Stappers, Hendrik Jan Wolter, Louis Van Dievort, Jacques Zon and Emile Rommelaere.

== Work ==
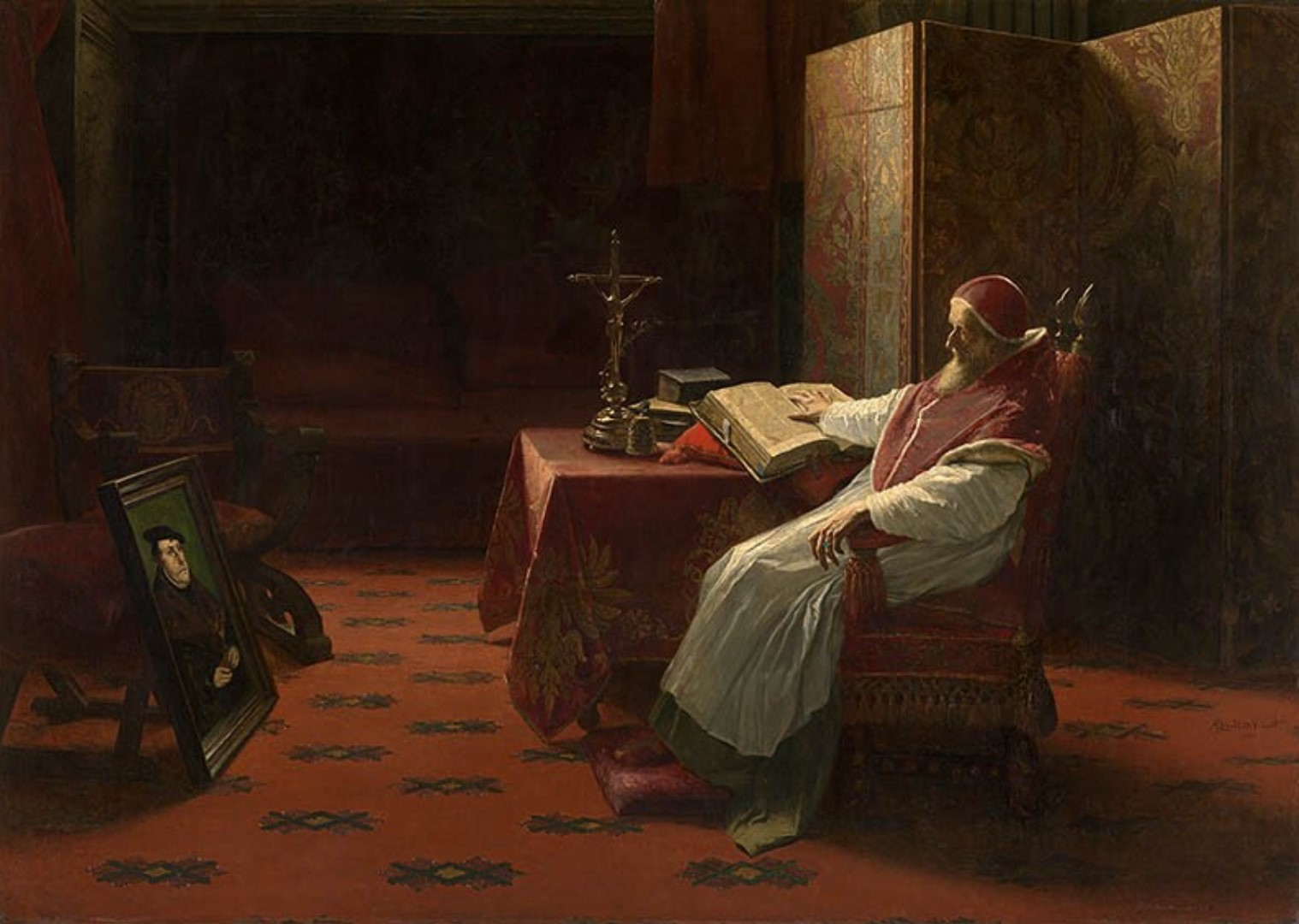
Pope Paul III for the portrait of Luther

Albrecht De Vriendt was a painter of genre scenes, religious subjects, history paintings, interiors and figure paintings. He was also a watercolourist and an etcher.

Albrecht De Vriendt's principal subject matter was the glorious Belgian and Flemish history from the 15th to the 17th centuries. He thus continued the tradition of the Belgian Romantic-historical school, which chose as the subject matter of their work important historical events in Belgium's history which were regarded as key to the country's national identity. The movement had started in the 1830s with painters such as Gustave Wappers, Louis Gallait, Ernest Slingeneyer, Nicaise de Keyser and other minor figures who had typically trained in Paris, where they had come into contact with the new Romantic movement. Unlike their French models, such as Delacroix, their work, though colourful, lacked true romantic zest and was quickly recuperated by the establishment, which rewarded the artists with commissions and rewards. An example of his work in this genre is Philip I conferring the Order of the Golden Fleece on his son Charles (1880, Brooklyn Museum) painted on the occasion of the 50th anniversary of the independence of Belgium. De Vriendt used an event from Belgium's glorious past to help create the notion of a distinctive heritage and cultural identity for the young Belgian nation. In this work, De Vriendt depicts a lavish courtroom in which Philip the Handsome (1478–1506) bestows the Order of the Golden Fleece on his one-year-old son, Charles (1500–1558), who had been born in Ghent (De Vriendt's native town). Charles later became the most powerful ruler of Europe. De Vriendt demonstrates in this work his skill in the rendering of fabrics as well as a sensitivity in depicting the confused expression of the infant Charles.

== Gallery ==
Works of Albrecht De Vriendt

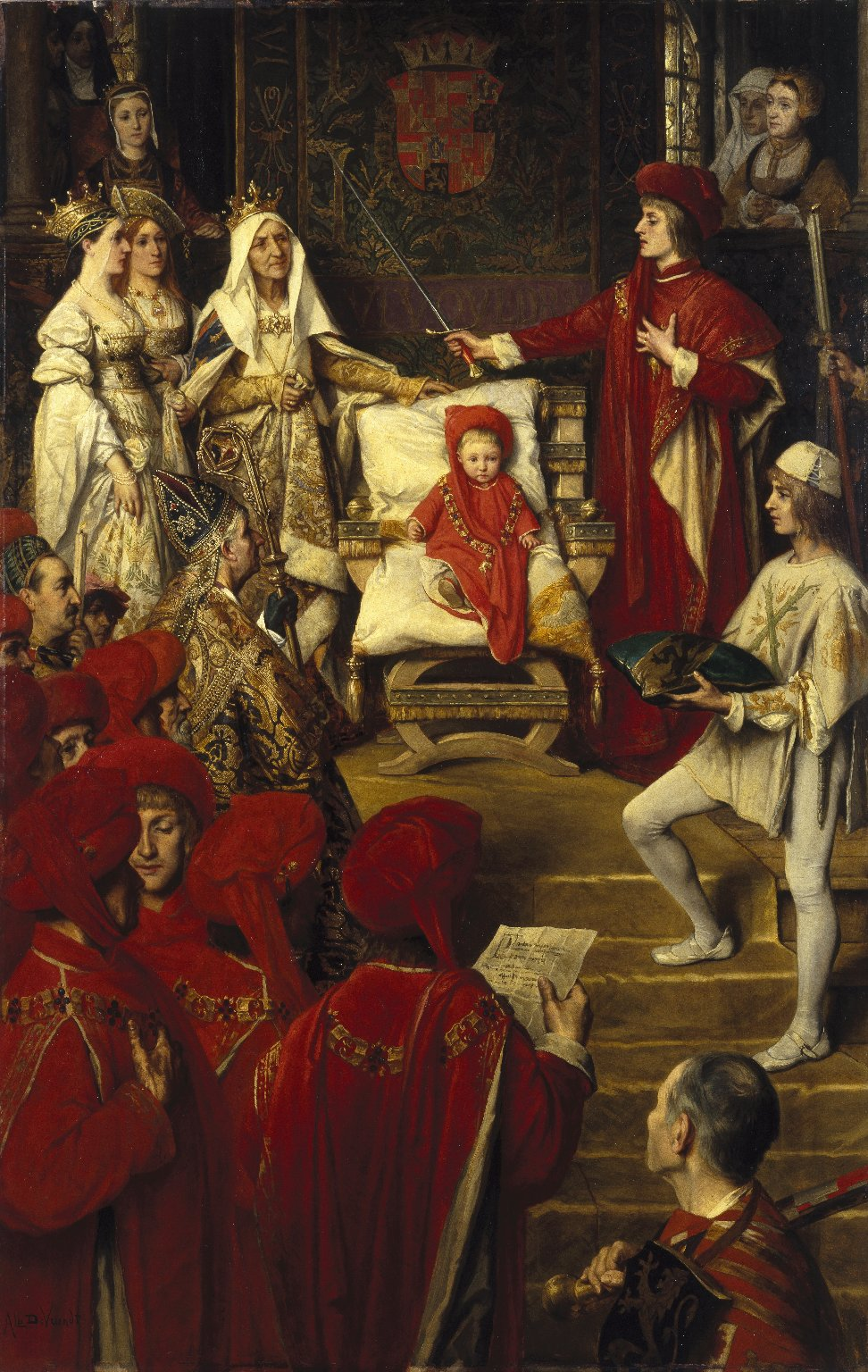
Philip I conferring the Order of the Golden Fleece on his son Charles

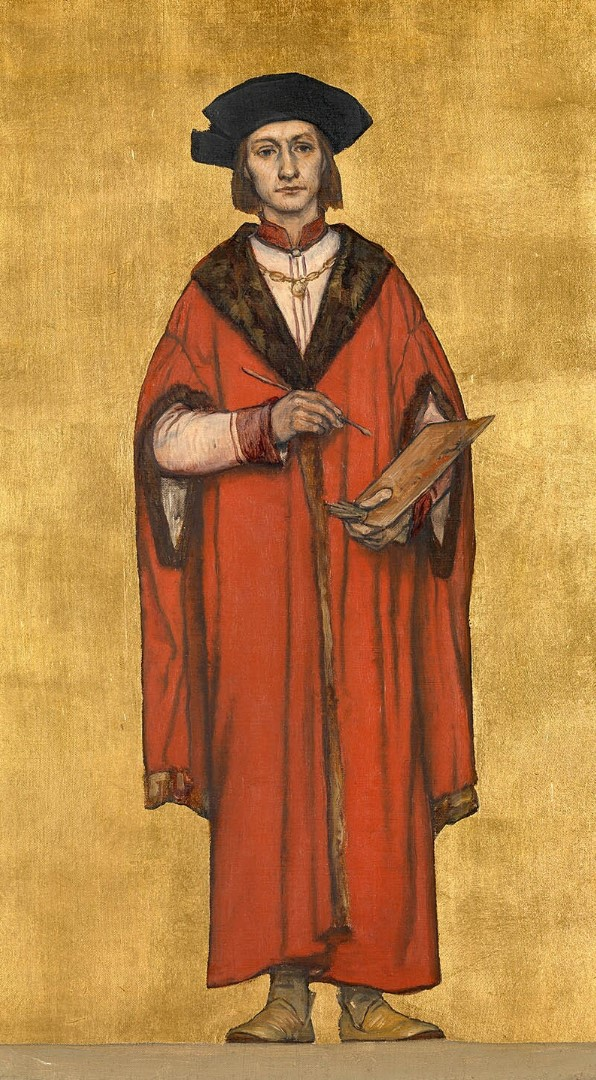
The painter Jan van Eyck

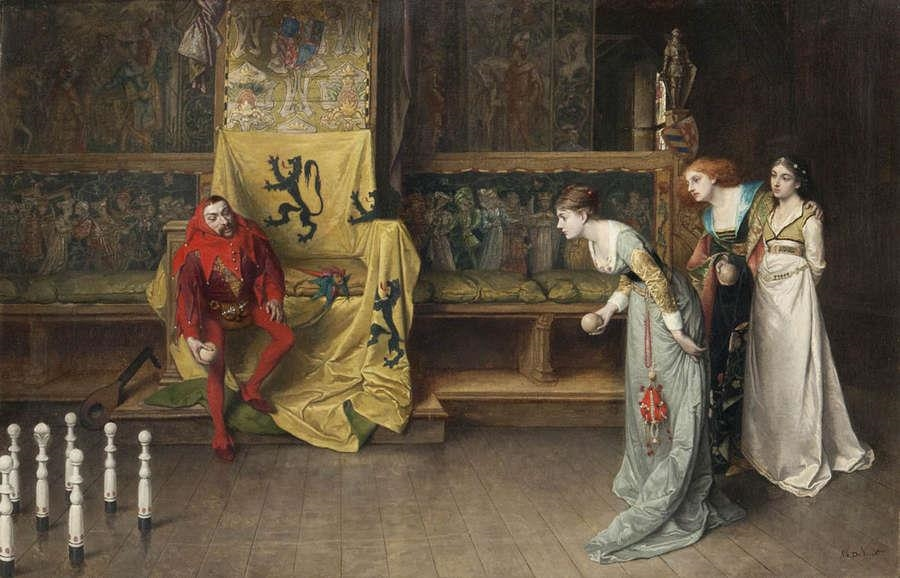
Fifteenth century Court Game

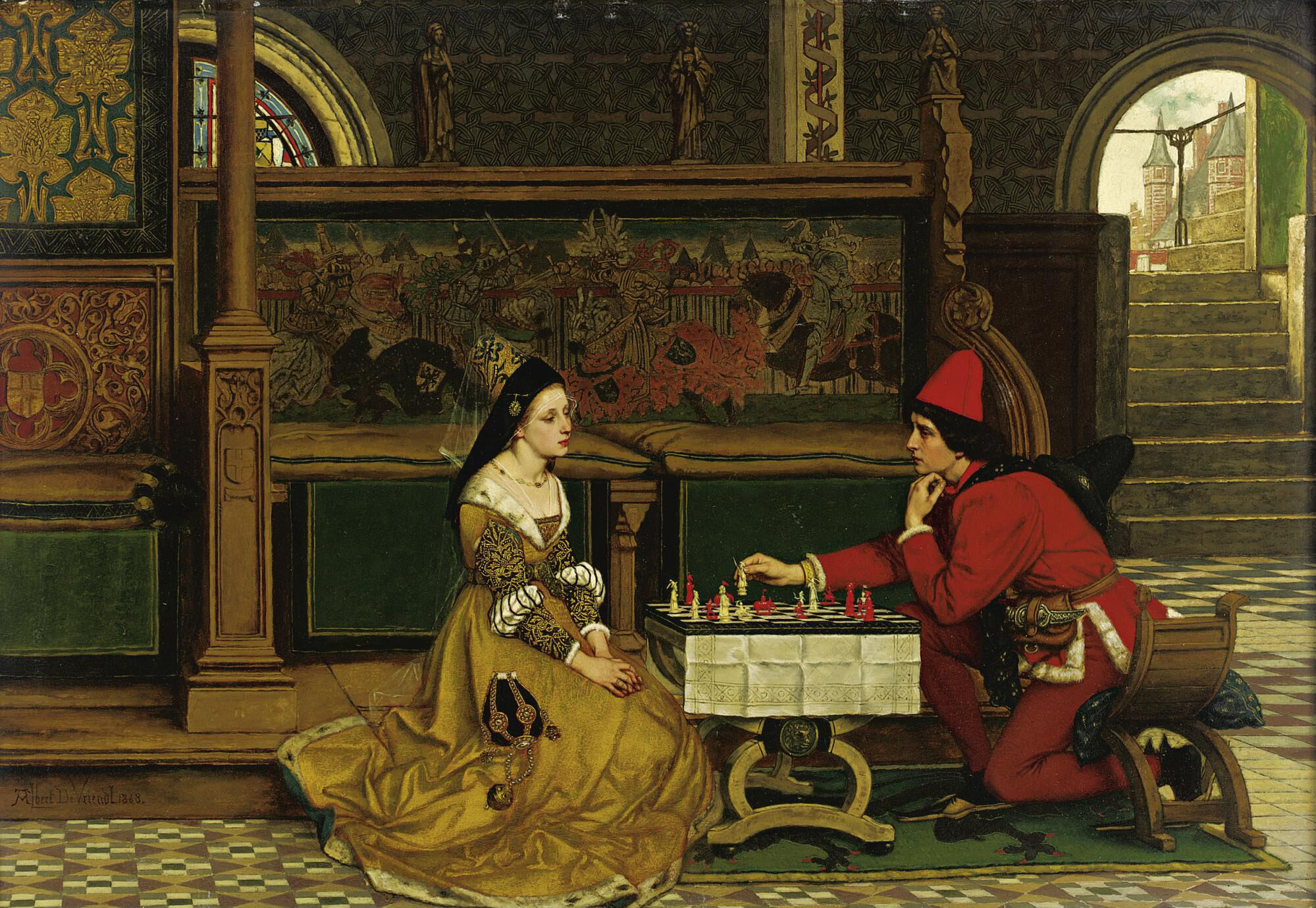
His move

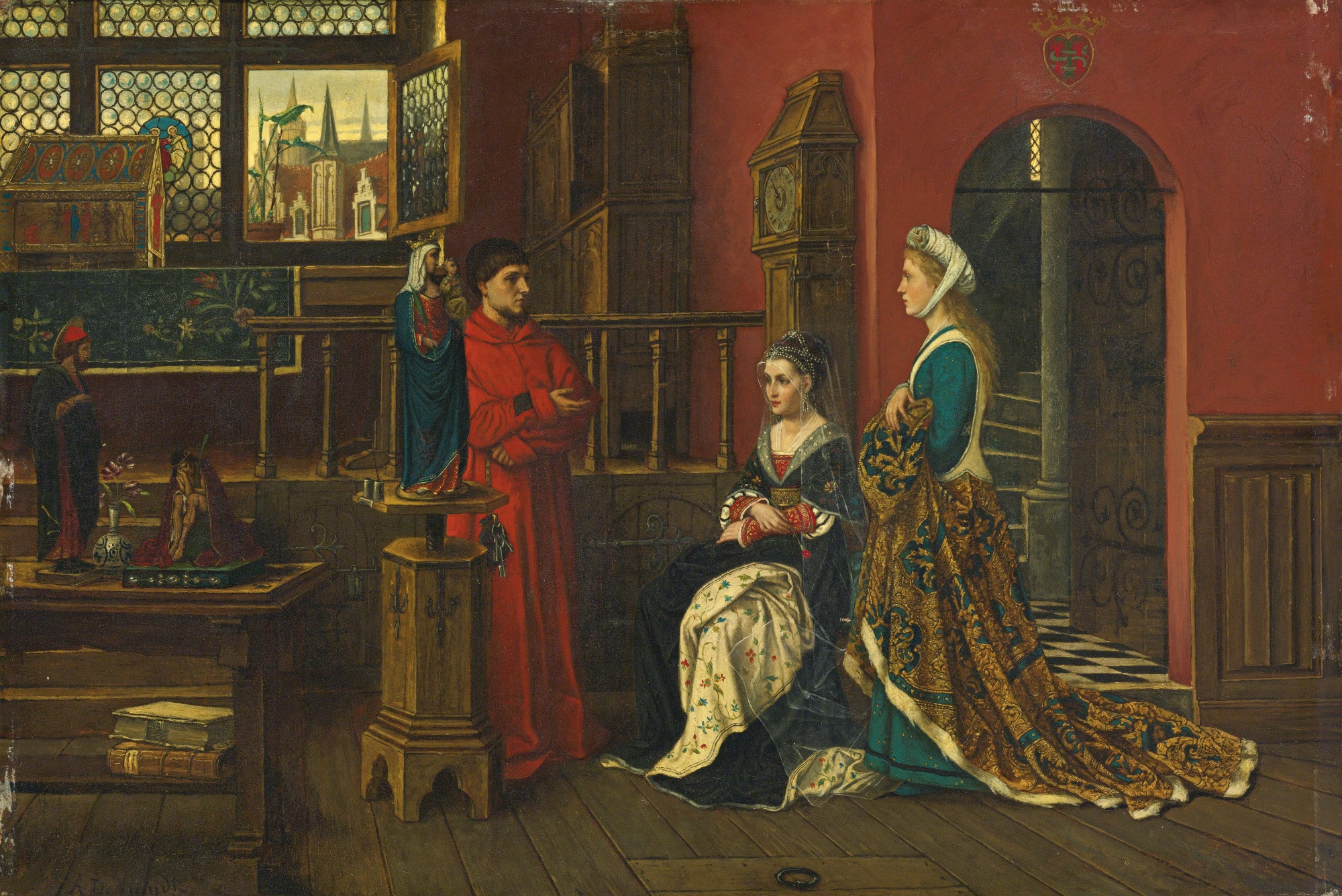
Queen with Lady in Waiting
