= Charles de Groux =

French painter

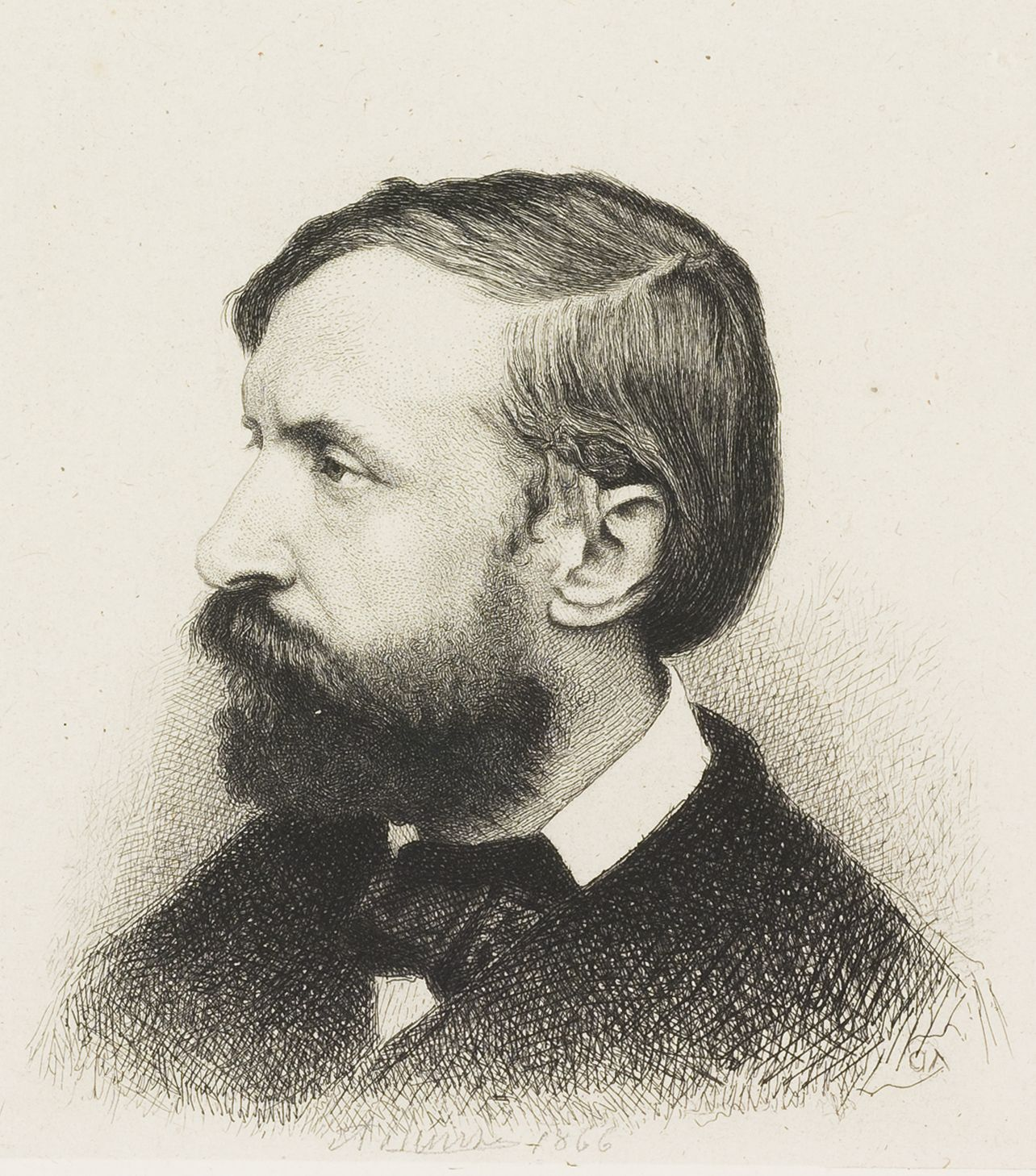
Charles de Groux

Charles de Groux (French pronunciation: [ʃaʁl də ɡʁu]) or Charles Degroux (25 August 1825 – 30 March 1870) was a French painter, engraver, lithographer and illustrator. As he moved to Belgium at a young age and his whole career took place in Belgium he is usually referred to as a Belgian artist. His depictions of scenes from the life of the disadvantaged and lower-class people of his time mark him as the first Belgian social realist painter. These works made him the precursor of Belgian Realist artists such as Constantin Meunier and Eugène Laermans.

== Life ==
Charles de Groux was born in Comines, a commune bordering on Belgium in the French Nord department. His father Jean Baptiste Joseph de Groux was a ribbon manufacturer. Charles was the 7th of 10 children. His family moved to Brussels in November 1833. Despite several attempts in later life to become a naturalised Belgian citizen, he remained a French national throughout his life.

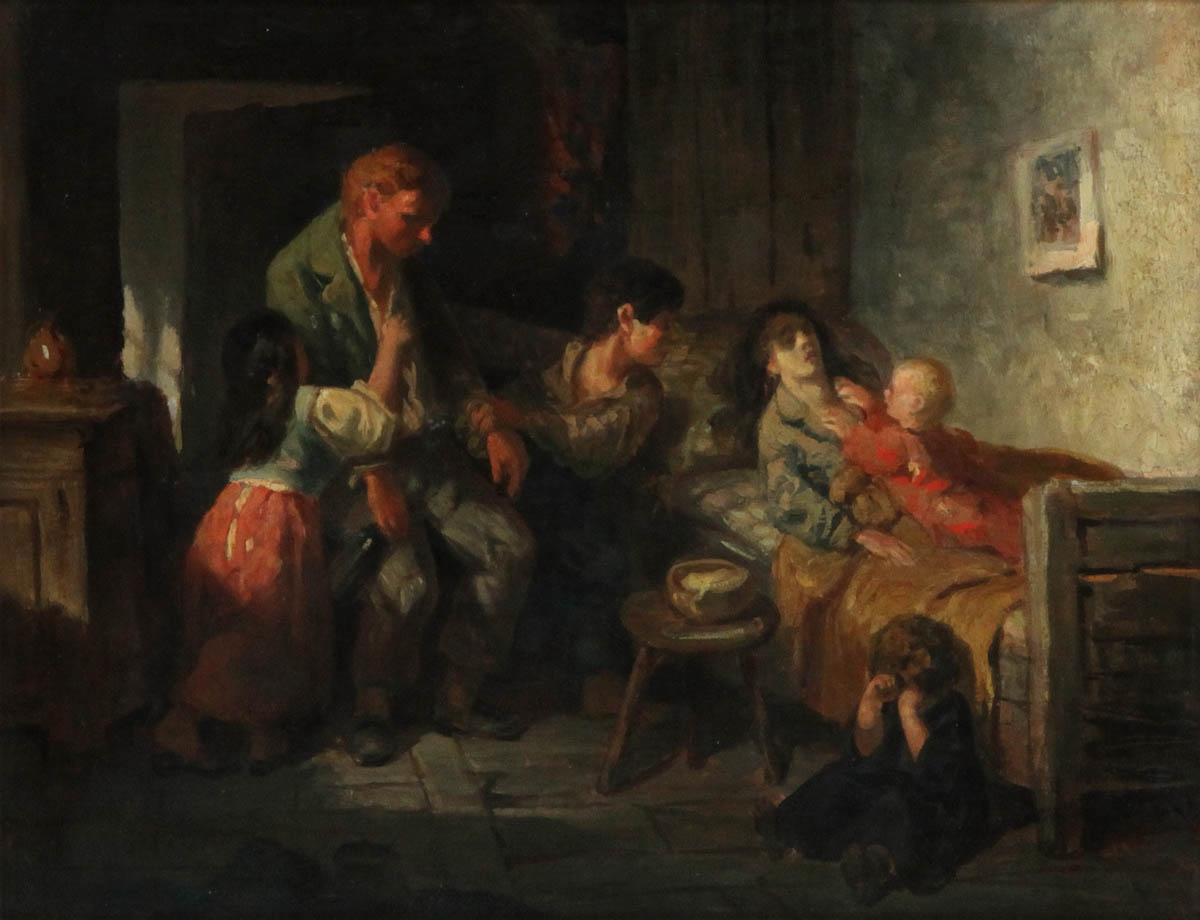
The farewell

De Groux attended courses at the Académie Royale des Beaux-Arts in Brussels. From 1843 he studied under François-Joseph Navez who was a director of the Académie and a neo-classical painter. He lived in those days a Bohemian life style. In 1849 he married Jeanne Geyssens of Brussels. The couple would have five children, one of whom called Henry became a prominent Symbolist painter. In April 1851 he left for Düsseldorf where he stayed for a year. Around 1853 de Groux had his first success with his work The Drunk (Royal Museums of Fine Arts of Belgium) (another version referred to as The farewell on the art market in 2017). This work depicting a dying woman, her drunk husband and their young children in a cramped and poorly lit room signaled a clear break with the lofty and elegant style and subjects of his master Navez.

De Groux became an illustrator of the satirical periodical Uylenspiegel founded by Félicien Rops, a prominent Belgian illustrator and draughtsman. Rops and de Groux met Gustave Courbet several times at the exhibitions of the latter in Belgium, Germany and the Netherlands. Courbet's influence on de Groux's aesthetic choices is evident as early as 1853.

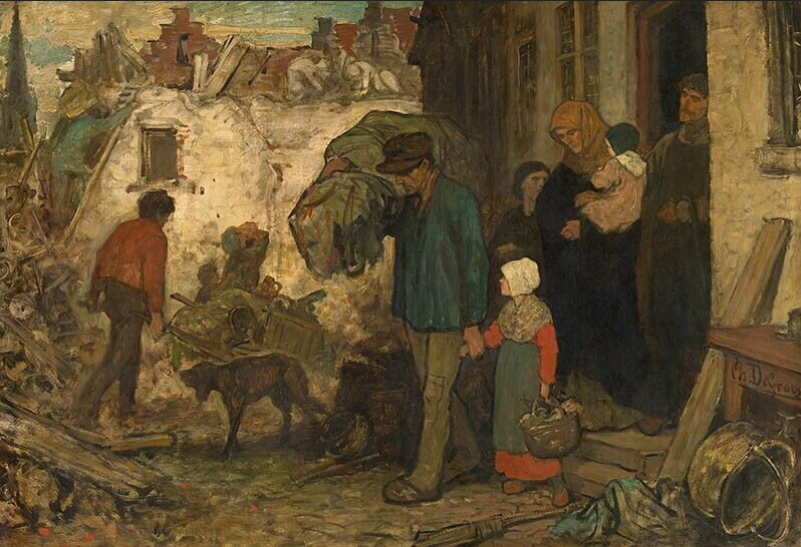
The eviction

He became a member of the Société royale belge des aquarellistes (Royal Belgian Society of Watercolorists) founded in 1856 to promote watercolor art in Belgium through the organisation of annual exhibitions. He joined in 1868 the Société Libre des Beaux-Arts (Free Society of Fine Arts), an organization formed in 1868 by Belgian artists to react against academicism and to advance Realist painting and artistic freedom. Based in Brussels, the society was active until 1876, by which time the aesthetic values it espoused had infiltrated the official Salon.

The Belgian government of that time promoted monumental art as a means of promoting nationalism and a revival of the arts in the young Belgian state. One of the projects promoted by the government was the decoration of the Ypres Cloth Hall. Charles de Groux was among various Belgian painters such as Jan Swerts and Godfried Guffens who were invited by the Belgian government to decorate the Ypres Cloth Hall. De Groux created his designs but died before he could realise the paintings. He was also invited to provide designs for the stained glass windows of the Cathedral of St. Michael and St. Gudula, which were executed by Jean-Baptiste Capronnier.

De Groux died on 30 March 1870 in Saint-Josse-ten-Noode at the age of 44.

== Work ==
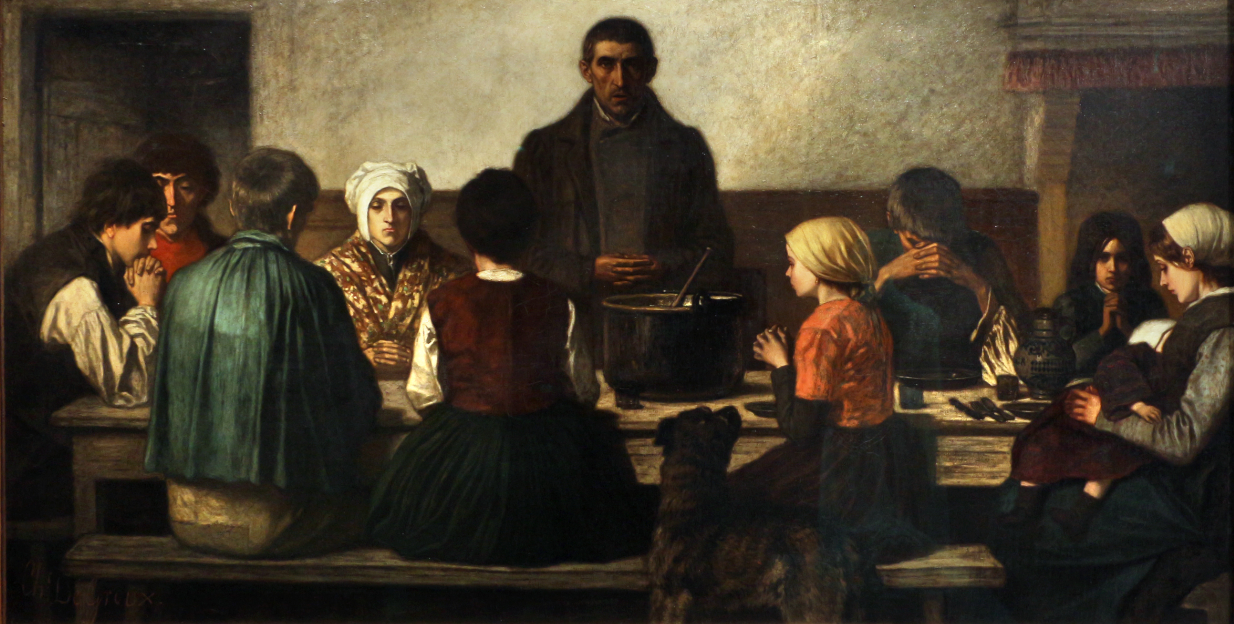
The blessing before supper

De Groux worked in different media, including oil painting, watercolor, pastel, engraving and lithography. He started out as a painter of history and religious scenes in the Romantic style then prevalent in Belgium. He later developed his own realist style which shows the influence of Courbet as well as genre painters of the 17th century.

Around 1853 de Groux had his first success with his work The Drunk (Royal Museums of Fine Arts of Belgium) (another version referred to as The farewell on the art market in 2017). It depicts a woman who is lying sick and dying on her bed while her drunk husband holding a bottle is brought in by two young children. The sober palette and the execution that neglected detailed depiction for global effect as well as the subject matter were de Groux' radical break with the Classicist style of Navez in favor of the 17th century genre painters such as Adriaen Brouwer. During this period de Groux painted many compositions depicting the disadvantaged people of his day in their misery and vices such as alcoholism and lassitude. Often he depicted scenes with priests and pilgrimages. He still painted some history scenes in this later phase such as The death of emperor Charles V (Royal Museums of Fine Arts of Belgium) and Frans Junius preaching the Reformation in secret in Antwerp.

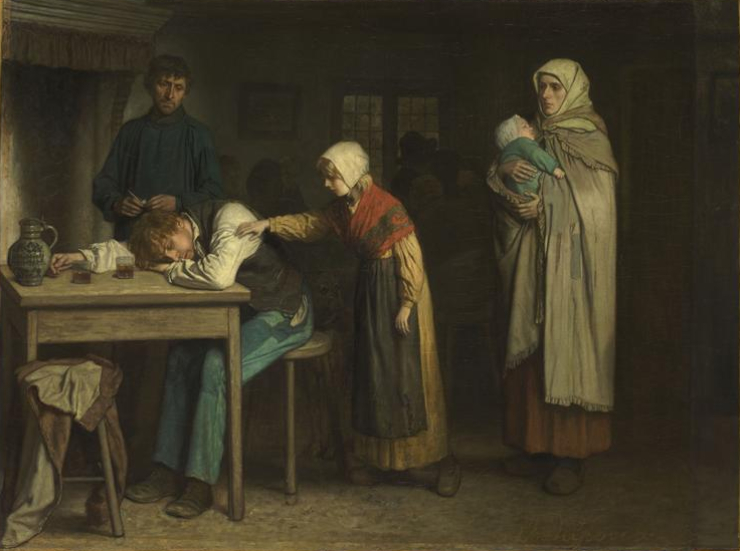
The drunk

De Groux' social realist works contain many religious overtones and references. This is obvious in his The blessing before supper, a solemn depiction of a peasant family saying grace before supper. The painting was closely linked to Christian representations of the Last Supper.

De Groux influenced many young, realistic painters, including his pupil Constantin Meunier and Eugene Laermans. Even the later society painter Gustave Léonard de Jonghe painted early in his career a social realist painting called Pilgrims Praying to Our Lady of the Afflicted or Our Lady of Mercy (1854, Royal Museums of Fine Arts of Belgium), which was clearly influenced by de Groux' social realist works. Vincent van Gogh is known to have admired de Groux's work The blessing before supper. Van Gogh's The Potato Eaters was inspired by this work of de Groux. Van Gogh also praised de Groux for his excellent 'types'. He was of the view that de Groux' studies and drawings displayed the same 'white-hot' passion that he found in the head studies of Frans Hals and Honoré Daumier, and in the novels of Zola and Balzac.
