= Otto Schwerdgeburth =

German painter (1835–1866)

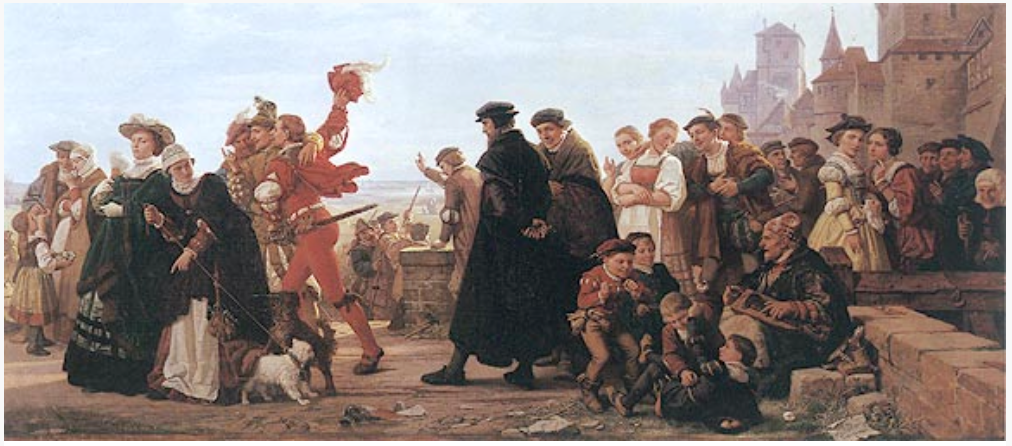
Faust's Easter Stroll (1864)

Otto Schwerdgeburth (5 March 1835 – 22 December 1866) was a German painter and engraver who painted mainly historical subjects.

== Life ==
Schwerdgeburth was born in Weimar from the second marriage of Carl August Schwerdgeburth, a well-known engraver and painter. He was first a pupil of his father and later studied under Friedrich Preller. He then travelled to Belgium where from 1856 to 1860 he studied at the Antwerp Academy of Fine Arts.

The Antwerp Academy played an important role in the Belgian historical painting movement. Schwerdgeburth became acquainted with leading artists of this school of painting such as Jan August Hendrik Leys, Jan Swerts and Godfried Guffens. He lived in Guffens' home for a while. In Antwerp he worked from 1856 to 1858 with Jan Swerts and Godfried Guffens on murals in the restored Old Bourse of Antwerp. The murals after designs by Jan Swerts and Godfried Guffens depicted scenes from Antwerp’s glorious trading past in a style reminiscent of the German Nazarene movement. These works were later destroyed by fire but some of the designs survive through engravings Schwerdgeburth made. Under the direction of Jan Swerts and Godfried Guffens, he also worked in 1859 together with Florent Claes on The Seven Sorrows of Mary in the Church of Our Lady in Melsele in Belgium.

He returned to Weimar in 1860 where he worked on various historical paintings. Suffering from ill health, he went to Bad Reichenhall for cures. After his health improved he spent time in Salzburg where he worked on the painting The Salzburg Protestants which he finished in 1863 after a second stay in Salzburg. This painting was very well received. He worked on other historical paintings. In order to make a painting on the execution of Andreas Hofer he travelled to Verona and from there on to Florence, Rome and Naples. He died in Weimar not long after his return from Rome.

== Work ==
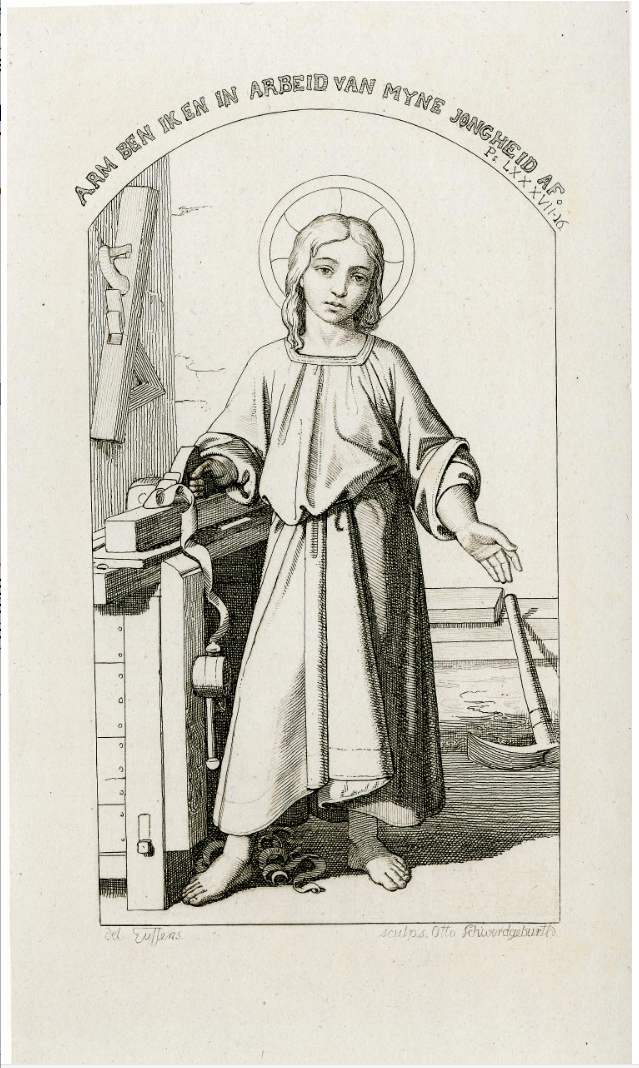
Christ as a child, standing at a carpenter's bench, etching

Only a few works by him are known. His paintings show the influence of the Belgian history painter Ferdinand Pauwels. He also made a number of etchings.

Pictures of Otto Schwerdgeburth are in the collections of the Wallraf-Richartz-Museum in Cologne, in the Kunsthalle Bremen and Schlossmuseum Weimar.

== Works ==
- Faust's Easter walk, 1864, oil on canvas, 83.5 × 184.5 cm, Wallraf-Richartz Museum, Cologne
- The Salzburg Protestants‘ final look at their home, Kunsthalle Bremen
- Andreas Hofer goes to his execution, Schlossmuseum Weimar
