= Swerts =

Swerts is a Belgian surname. Notable people with the surname include:

- Gill Swerts (born 1982), Belgian football player
- Jan Swerts (1820–1879), Belgian painter
- Roger Swerts (born 1942), Belgian cyclist
