= Jozef Janssens =

Belgian painter (1854–1930)

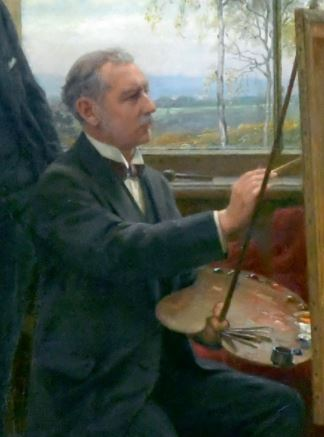
Self-portrait (1918), detail from a larger painting

Jozef Marie Aloys Janssens de Varebeke (29 May 1854 – 29 June 1930) was a Belgian painter, known for his portraits and religious works.

== Biography ==
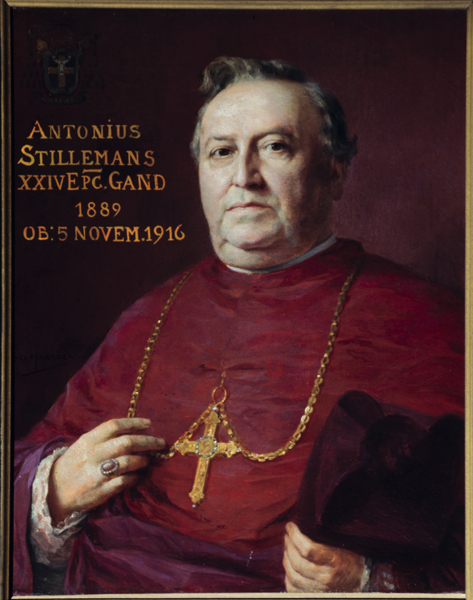
Portrait of Antoon Stillemans

Jozef Janssens was born in Sint-Niklaas, the eldest child of the industrialist and politician, Theodoor Janssens, and his wife Marie-Angélique, née Beeckman (1834–1889). His father drew as a hobby, and numbered several artists among his friends, including Jan Swerts and Godfried Guffens. After graduating from the gymnasium in his hometown, Jozef worked in his father's factory and then attended the Jesuit college in Bergen. During this time, he also took drawing lessons from Swerts. In 1872, when his father received a visit from Franz Ittenbach and Karl Müller, two painters from Düsseldorf, they saw Jozef's drawings and recommended that he undertake formal studies.

These were begun with Ittenbach, at his studio in Düsseldorf. He worked there until late 1874. He also took professional advice from the religious artist, Ernst Deger. Later, he worked with Guffens in Brussels. In 1876, he went to Rome where, thanks to a recommendation from Ittenbach, he was able to study with Ludovico Seitz. From Rome, he would often visit Monte Cassino, where Desiderius Lenz, founder of the Beuron Art School, was painting the church tower; together with his associates Gabriel Wüger and Fridolin Steiner.

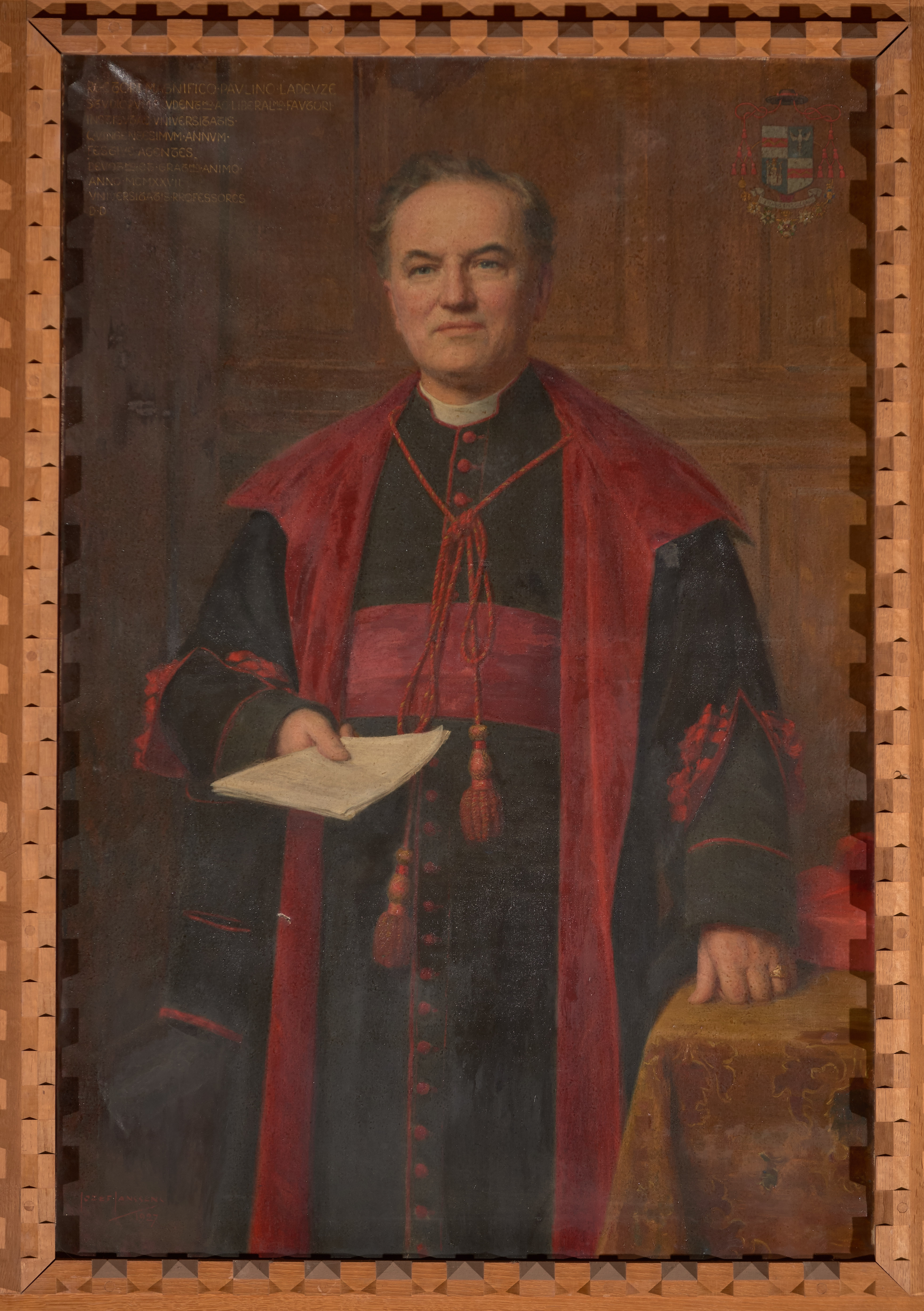
Portrait of Paulin Ladeuze (1927) in the Reading Room of the University Library of Louvain.

In 1880, he completed his studies there, and returned to Antwerp; establishing his own studio in 1884. He was married there, to Marie Lucie, née Hye-Hoys (1866–1950), and they had eight children.

In addition to his canvases, from 1890 to 1910 he provided decorative paintings for the Jesuit church in Leuven, the Beguine monastery in Ghent and the Maredsous Abbey in Namur, as well as the Cathedral of Our Lady in Antwerp. Many of his portraits were of clergymen; notably Popes Leo XIII and Pius X, the Archbishop of Mechelen, Désiré-Joseph Mercier, and the Bishop of Ghent, Antoon Stillemans. In 1904, Pius X presented him with the Order of St. Sylvester.

During World War I, he lived as a refugee in Manchester, where he made his living as a portrait painter. Among his subjects there were the physicist, Ernest Rutherford, and his daughter Eileen. He died in Antwerp.

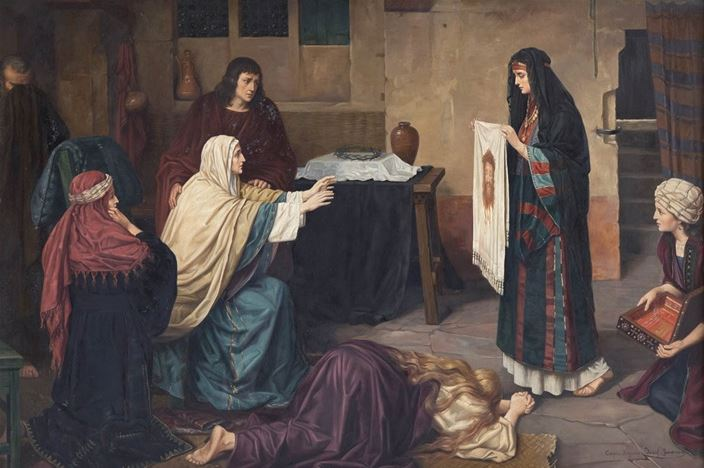
Veronica Showing the Veil

Hs younger brother, Frans, was a Catholic priest and a scientist, involved in genetic research. He is credited with discovering chromosomal crossover.
