= F. S. Coburn =

Canadian artist

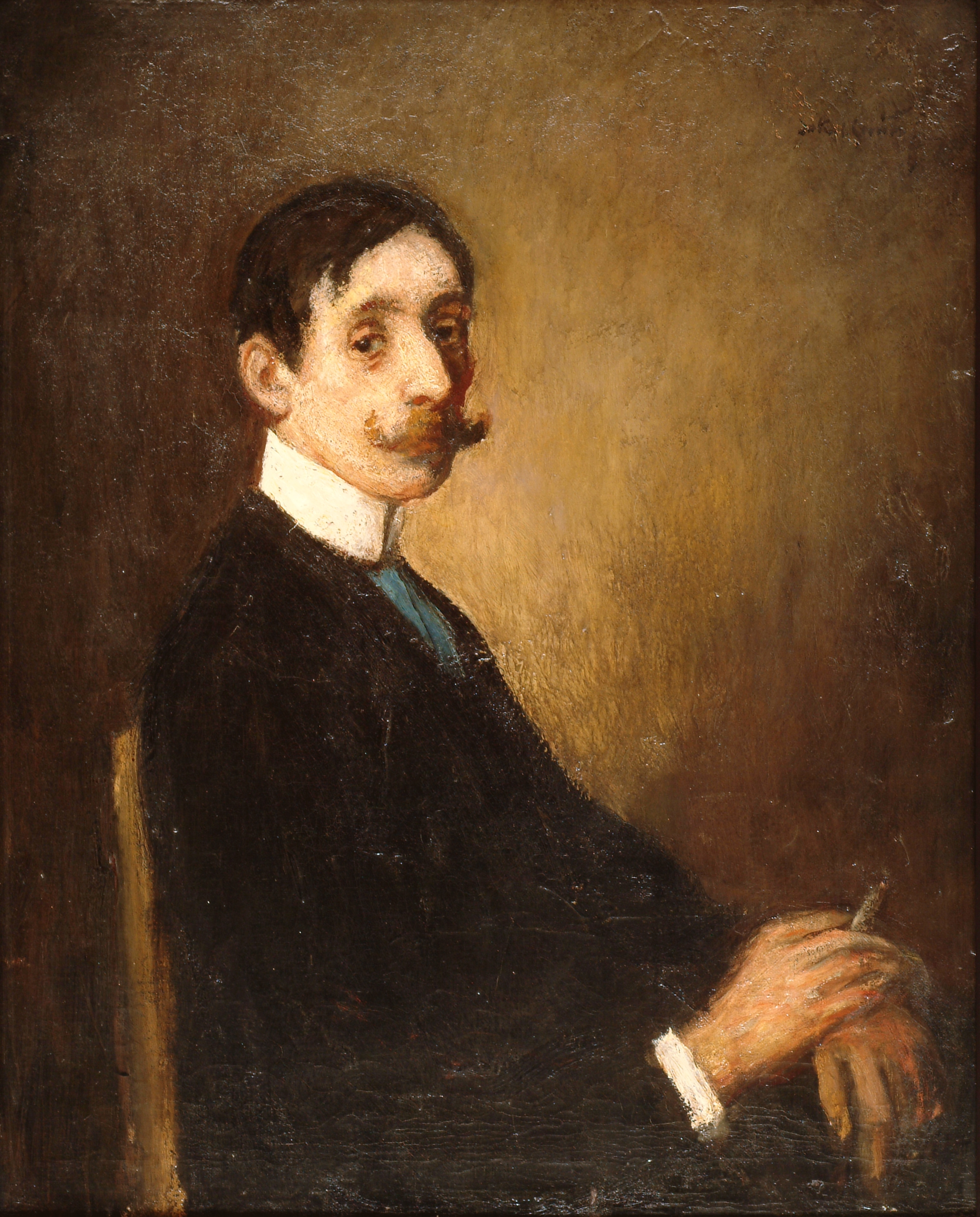
- Coburn in 1896 (portrait by Jakob Smits)
- Born: Frederick Simpson Coburn; March 18, 1871; Upper Melbourne, Quebec
- Died: May 26, 1960 (aged 89)
- Education: Council of Arts and Manufactures School, Montreal; Carl Hecker School of Art, New York; Royal Academy, Berlin (1890); Jean-Léon Gérôme in his studio, Paris; Slade School of Fine Art, London with Henry Tonks; Institute for Fine Arts, Antwerp with Albrecht de Vriendt (1897)
- Spouse: Malvina Scheepers (died 1933)
- Elected: full member, Royal Canadian Academy of Arts (1941)

F. S. Coburn RCA D.C.L. (March 18, 1871 – May 26, 1960), also known as Frederick Simpson Coburn, was a Canadian painter, illustrator and a photographer of note.

== Career ==
Coburn was born in the village of Upper Melbourne in Quebec's Eastern Townships, southeast of Montreal. His talent was recognized early by William Henry Drummond who introduced him to the firm of Notman and Fraser for advice on Coburn's art education. It suggested the Council of Arts and Manufactures School in Montreal where he studied briefly before moving on to the Carl Hecker School of Art in New York, the Royal Academy in Berlin (1890), study with Jean-Léon Gérôme in Paris, then in London, the Slade School of Fine Art, with Henry Tonks. While studying with Tonks, he did paintings for the London Sporting and Dramatic News, and illustrations for the London News.

In 1896, he illustrated the first volume of poetry by William Henry Drummond on rural Quebec society, The Habitant (1897) and to do this, spent weeks living with and sketching habitant families. He later illustrated all of Drummond's works. In 1897, he returned to Europe for additional study with Albrecht de Vriendt at the Institut Supérieur des Beaux-Arts in Belgium. While there, he painted the thatched cottages, cattle, beaches and windmills of Holland as well as Dutch interiors and became fluent in French, German, Dutch and Flemish. In 1898, he won the Belgian Government's "Goot" subsidy, which entitled him to three years of tuition-free study.

Coburn illustrated Louis Fréchette's Christmas in French Canada (1899), followed by the French edition, La Noël au Canada (1900). He later collaborated with G.P. Putnam Company of New York, and illustrated books by authors such as Charles Dickens, Edgar Allan Poe, Alfred Lord Tennyson, and others. He also illustrated magazine articles and covers.

In the early 1900s, Coburn painted still lifes of flowers, portraits, and spring and summer landscapes of the Eastern Townships which were dark in tone. In 1913, he returned to live in Canada after years spent living in Antwerp. In 1914, sketching trips with Maurice Cullen changed the coloration and subject-matter of his work. He began painting oils in full colour and with a study of the effects of light. He specialized in the painting of horse and oxen drawn sleds in Laurentian and Eastern Townships settings.

His work was exhibited in Canada and abroad. In 1928, he exhibited two canvases at the Imperial Gallery of Art Exhibition in London, England. In 1929, he won the Art Association of Montreal's Jessie Dow prize for his painting, March Morning. In 1932, the Arts Club of Montreal held a special exhibition of his Drummond illustrations. In 1938, he exhibited two paintings in the Tate Gallery's A Century of Canadian Art exhibition in London. He became a full member of the Royal Canadian Academy of Arts in 1941. He also was a member of the Pen and Pencil Club of Montreal and its President (1942). In 1936, he received an Honorary Doctor of Civil Law conferred upon him by Bishop's University at Lennoxville, Quebec. His work is included in public collections such as the National Gallery, Brisbane, Australia; The Tate, London, England; the National Gallery of Canada and the Sherbrooke Museum; in galleries in Japan; Belgium; Europe; and the USA. A 1940 photograph of a work by Coburn taken by Notman and Fraser is in the collection of the McCord Museum, Montreal.

After his wife's death in 1933, he was inspired by a model named Carlotta and painted her in the dance costumes she created for her performances of the Tango and other dances. Coburn also learned how to dance, and together with Carlotta and her dance partner, Alvarez, he established a dance studio in Montreal. On May 26, 1960, Frederick Simpson Coburn died peacefully in his Melbourne studio at 89 years of age.

== Personal life ==
In Antwerp the met his future wife, the Belgian artist, Malvina Scheepers. Together, they established a studio-home in Coburn's village of Upper Melbourne, Quebec and a pied-à-terre in Montreal.
