= Louis Van Dievort =

Belgian painter

Louis Charles Van Dievort or Louis Van Dievort, birth name Ludovicus Carolus Van Dievort, last name sometimes also spelled Vandievort and Vandiervort (baptized 4 April 1875, Antwerp – died 13 May 1963, Watermael-Boitsfort) was a Belgian Realist painter. He is mainly known for his portraits, history scenes and genre works.

== Life ==
Van Dievort was the son of Franciscus Josephus (Frans) Van Dievort (1832–1903) of Antwerp and Maria Philomena De Bock originally from Sint-Niklaas. His father was a sculptor. In the mid 1870s the family was living on the Avenue Plantyn (now Plantin en Moretuslei) in Antwerp. He studied at the Academy of Fine Arts of Antwerp and the Higher Institute of Fine Art in Antwerp, where Albrecht De Vriendt was one of his teachers. He also trained at the École des Beaux-Arts in Paris where Léon Bonnat was one of his teachers. He enrolled at the École on 25 July 1895.

He participated during the late 1890s and early 1900s in various art exhibitions in Antwerp and Brussels as well as abroad such as the Louisiana Purchase Exposition of 1904 in St. Louis, United States. In the early years of the 20th century he was living on the Vestingstraat in Antwerpen.

== Work ==
His signed and dated works date to the period from 1892 to 1909. There are no later signed and dated works found which may indicate a change in career, clientele or location of the artist. He painted portraits, genre paintings and history scenes. Examples include works with titles such as Attila, Mourned by His Women, Merovingian Funeral, Making Jelly, Girl with a Red Scarf, an Invasion Episode, Portrait of Albert I of Belgium and Elegant elderly lady with an open book. His style reflects the Realist style of Belgian academic art and the influence of 17th-century Spanish and Dutch art.
