= Marguerite Charlotte Lavoie =

Canadian dancer (1912–2005)

Carlotta
- Born: Marguerite Charlotte Lavoie; 1912; Saint-Jérôme (now Métabetchouan)
- Died: 2005
- Occupation: Dancer

Marguerite Charlotte Lavoie (1912–2005), also known as Carlotta, was a Canadian dancer. She became Canadian artist Frederick Simpson Coburn's muse and was portrayed in multiple of his paintings and photographs.

== Life ==
Marguerite was born in Saint-Jerôme (now Métabetchouan), Quebec in 1912. After becoming an orphan at the age of 4, she was raised by an aunt. She met the dancer and choreographer Alvarez (Gérard Hébert) at a Saint John Baptist parade in Montréal. He became her partner in the stage and in life.

== Career ==
Carlotta built her career in Montreal between the years 1930 and 1950. She opened a dance studio with Alvarez, her partner, in mid 1930s with the financial help of their friend Frederick S Coburn. The studio remained open for more than 25 years.

Carlotta and Alvarez had a strong attraction for the Spanish culture and visited Spain several times. The couple practiced a huge variety of dances and created their own costumes.

Carlotta met the artist Frederick Simpson Coburn in 1933 while working as a model. She quickly became his muse, being portrayed in multiple of his paintings and photographs. Carlotta introduced Coburn to the dance, which helped him anticipate her movements and capture them through his photos.
