= Felix Jenewein =

Czech painter, illustrator and lithographer

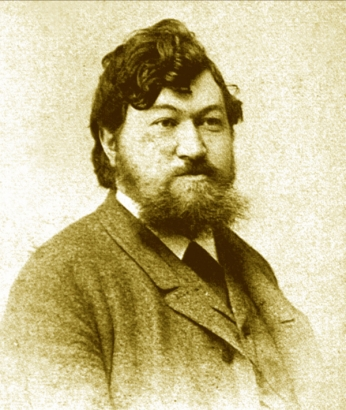
Felix Jenewein (1890s)

Felix Jenewein (4 August 1857, in Kutná Hora – 2 January 1905, in Brno) was a painter, illustrator and lithographer from Austria-Hungary. Many of his best known works have a somber tone.

== Biography ==
His father was a clerk at a tobacco factory and the family moved to Prague when he received a promotion. While still a young boy, Felix showed a talent for drawing and, after his mother showed his work to Antonín Lhota, he was able to study at the Academy of Fine Arts, Prague, with Lhota and Jan Swerts. Later, he continued his studies at the Academy of Fine Arts, Vienna, where he studied with Josef Matyáš Trenkwald and assisted him with painting frescoes at the Votive Church.

After some disagreements with his teachers there, and prompted by his father's declining health, he returned to Prague and married a schoolteacher in 1882. While there, he participated in the competition to redecorate the Rudolfinum and contributed illustrations for several periodicals, including Paleček (Tom Thumb) and Zlatá Praha.

From 1890 to 1892, after failing to obtain a position at the Academy, he taught drawing at the School of Applied Arts. In 1902, he moved to Brno to teach at the University of Technology. He also served on the purchasing committee at the Moravian Museum. His style gradually evolved from Romanticism to Art Nouveau and Symbolism, although his themes were often inspired by the earlier Nazarene movement. His largest work involved a series of decorations for the Church of the Holy Family in the Ottakring district of Vienna.

He died suddenly from a stroke and was returned to Kutná Hora for burial. In 1941, his widow donated over 200 works, plus correspondence and personal items, to the city. In the 1970s, an art gallery bearing his name was established there.

== Selected works ==
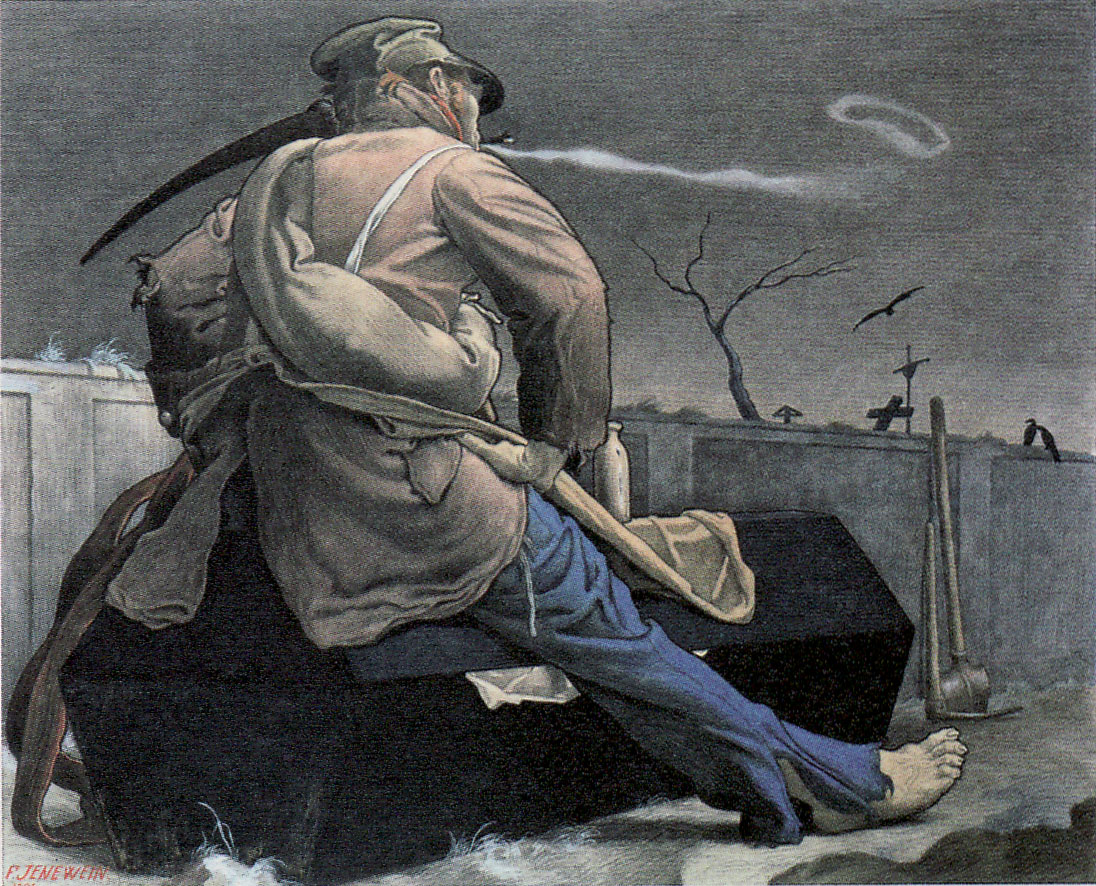
Burial of a Suicide

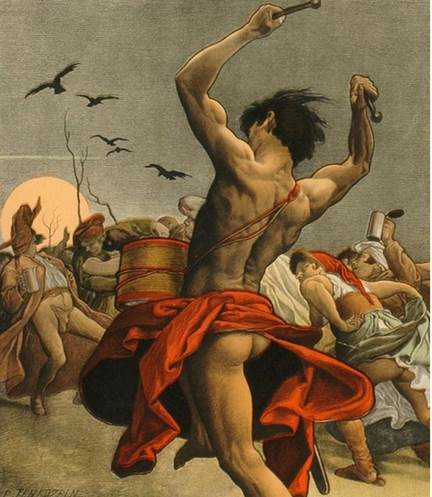
Debauchery
(Plague series)

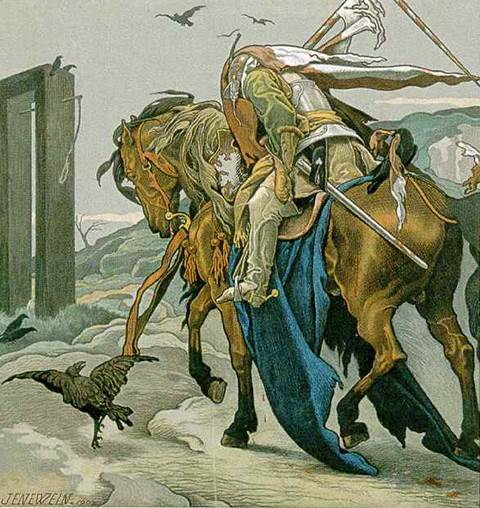
White Mountain

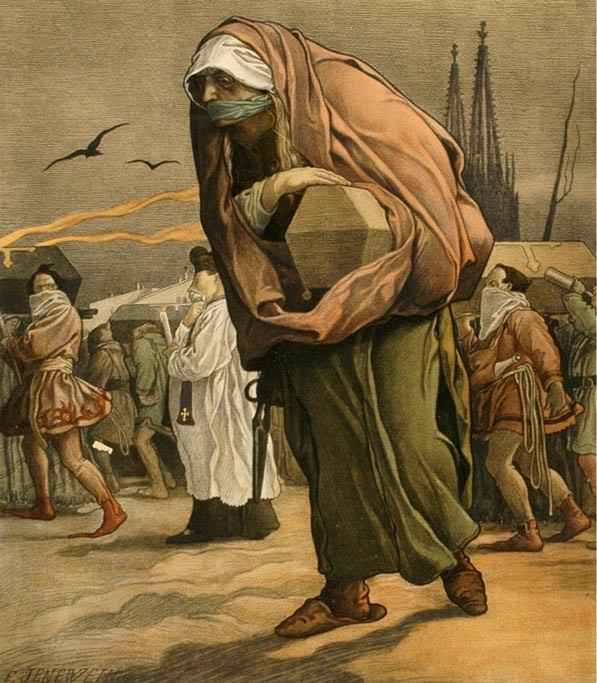
Dead Child
(Plague series)
