= Jean Baptiste van Eycken =

Belgian painter

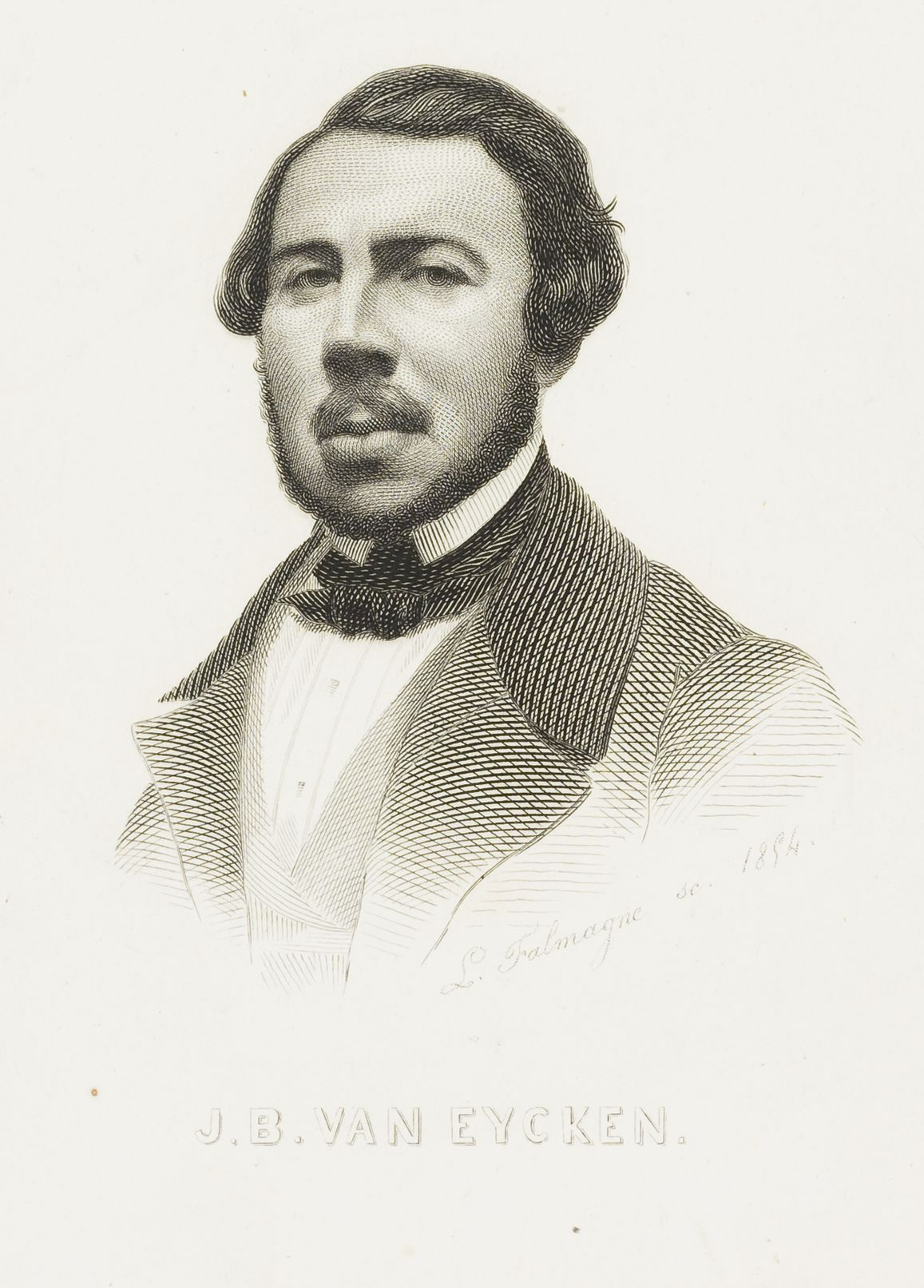
- Born: Jean Baptiste van Eycken; 16 September 1809; Brussels, Belgium
- Died: 19 December 1853 (aged 44)
- Education: Académie Royale des Beaux-Arts of Brussels
- Occupation: Painter
- Parent(s): Corneille van Eycken and Elise Cordemans

Jean Baptiste van Eycken (16 September 1809 – 19 December 1853) was a Belgian historical and religious painter.

== Life ==
Van Eycken was born at Brussels, Belgium. He was the son of Corneille van Eycken and Elise Cordemans, and as a boy was employed in commercial pursuits, but from 1829, when his father died, he gave himself over entirely to the study of art. In 1830 he studied at the Académie Royale des Beaux-Arts of Brussels under François-Joseph Navez and Paul Delaroche, in 1835 gained an important prize with high distinctions, and four years afterwards was appointed professor of drawing and painting. In 1838 he went to Italy, returning in 1839 and assuming his professorship. In that year he exhibited his great picture of Divine Pity (La clémence divine), which was warmly received and brought him a gold medal and a high position in the Société des Beaux Arts de France. In 1840 he married Julie Noël, who died on 11 February 1843. He himself died at Schaerbeek eleven years later, at the age of 45.

== Works ==
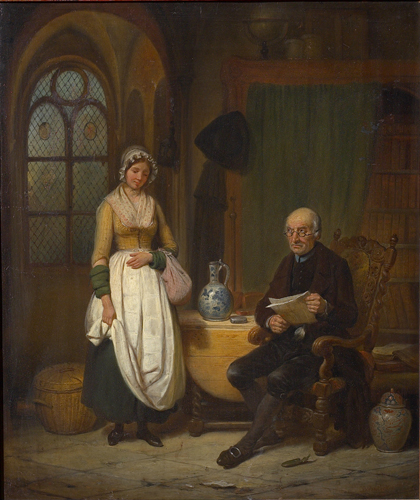
The Letter of Introduction, oil on canvas

Two of his most important pictures were those representing Captive Christians and St. Boniface, for the Église de la Chapelle; but for the same building he carried out no less than fourteen pictures representing the Passion of Christ and these were exhibited in 1847 and gained for him the Order of Leopold. His best-known picture perhaps is entitled Abundance, a replica of which the artist was employed to make for Prince Albert, according to the instructions of the queen of the Belgians, Marie-Louise. He was intensely interested in the subject of mural decoration, and studied every variety of it very closely, preparing a long essay on the subject and a series of paintings representing the Beatitudes, in order to exemplify his ideas in this direction. He also gave some attention to sculpture and to designing medallions.
