= Jan Swerts =

Belgian painter

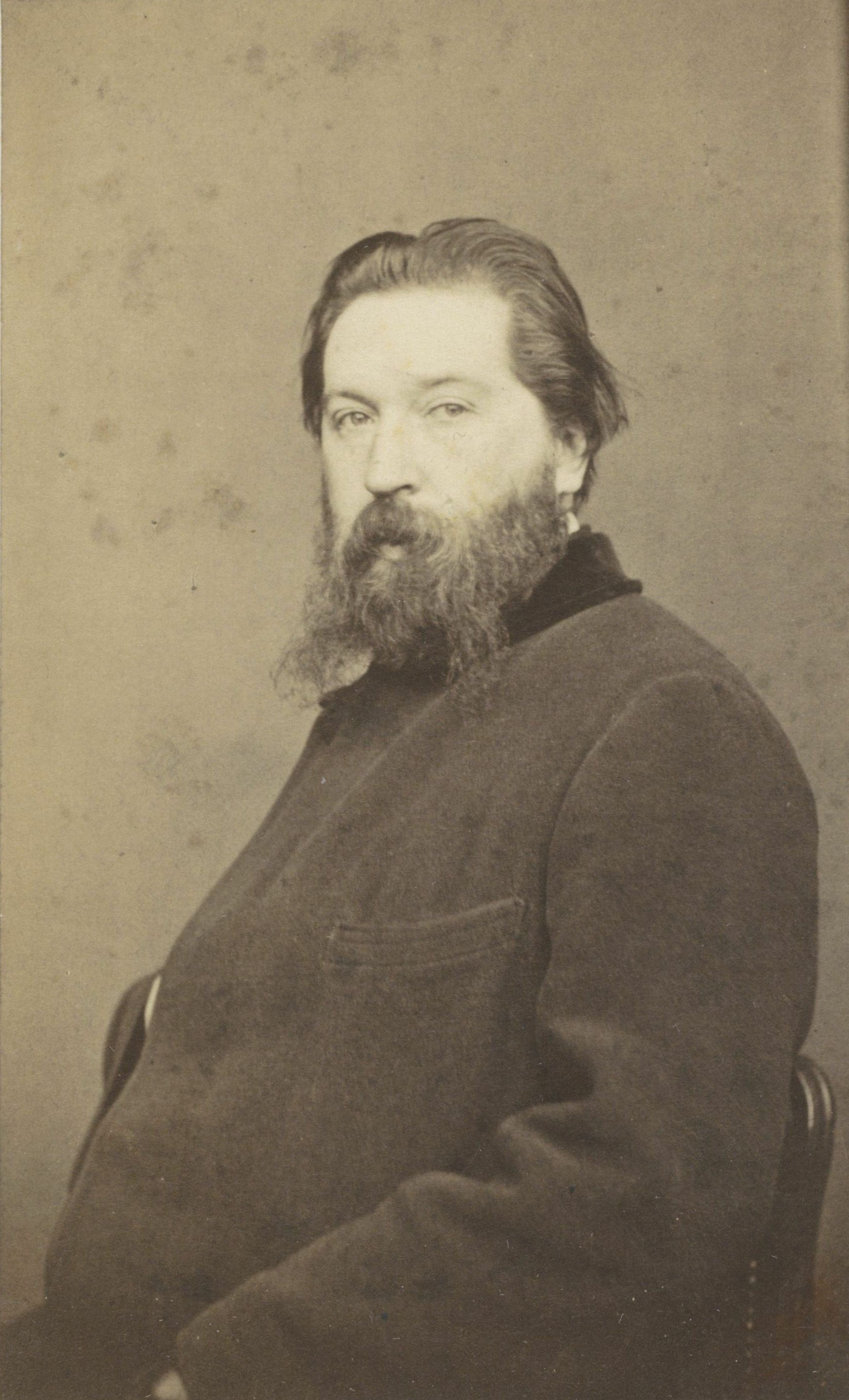
Portrait of Jan Swerts

Jan Swerts (25 December 1820 – 11 August 1879) was a Belgian painter of historical subjects and portraits who worked on many publicly funded commissions. He played a major role in introducing German Romantic historical painting into Belgium. His fresco's using oil paint heralded a revival of a colouristic style derived from Rubens and Flemish Baroque painting combined with historical and psychological realism.

== Life ==
=== Training ===
Jan Swerts was born in Antwerp. He was a student of that city's leading history painter, Nicaise De Keyser, at the Antwerp Academy of Fine Arts. Here he met Godfried Guffens, another pupil of De Keyser, who became a close friend. The two friends visited Paris together in 1848 where they saw paintings of Victor Orsel, a French follower of Johann Friedrich Overbeck. Overbeck was the leading painter of the German Romantic Nazarene movement, which aimed to revive honesty and spirituality in Christian art. Swerts and Guffens were so impressed by this style of painting that they decided to travel on to Germany where they visited the frescos painted by the Nazarenes.

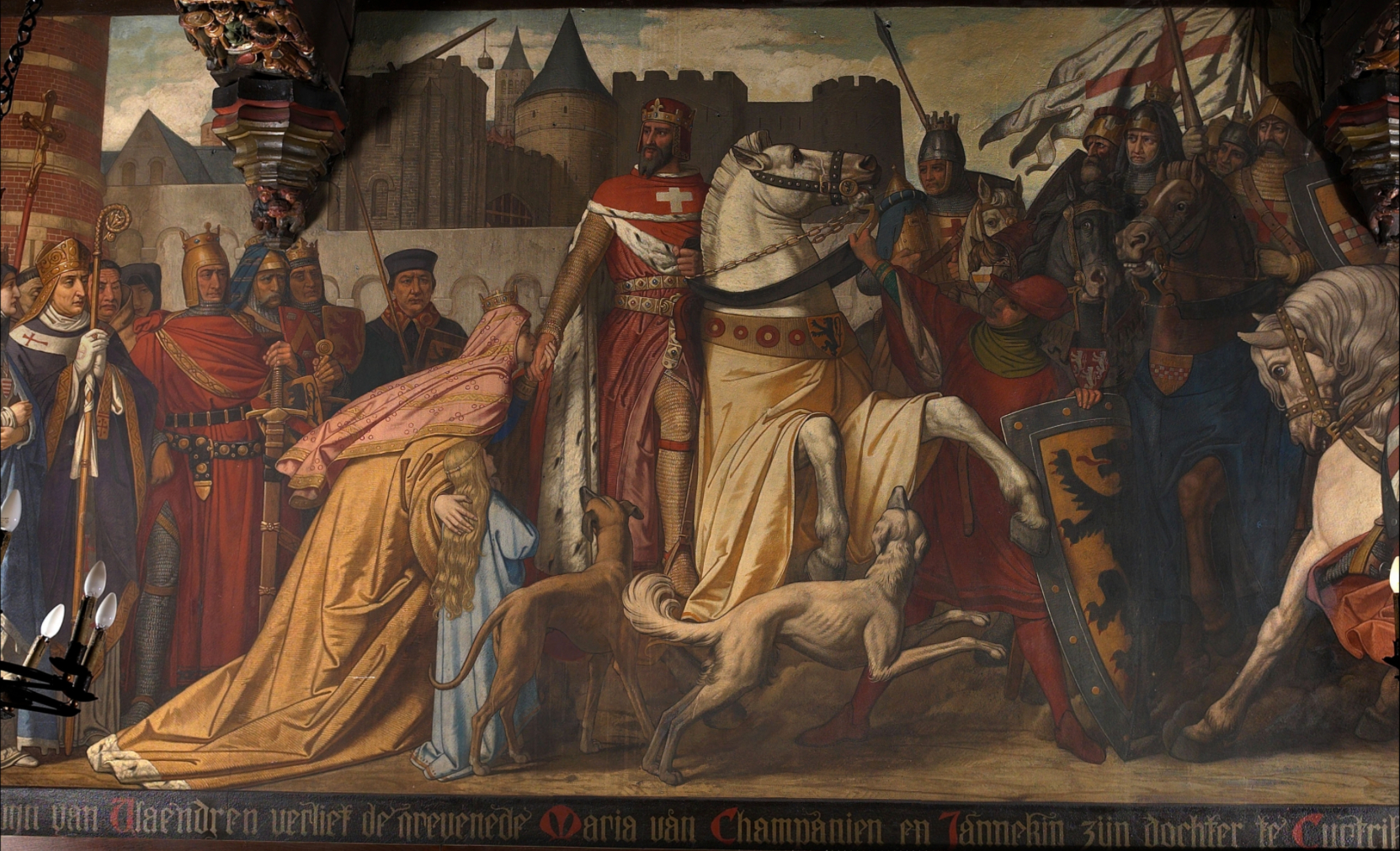
Boudewijn of Flanders leaves Marie of Champagne and their daughter Joan (Kortrijk City Hall fresco)

They left in August 1850 and travelled to Aachen, Köln, Düsseldorf, Remagen, Berlin, Dresden, Leipzig, Prague and Munich. In these various places they met with members of the Nazarene movement who were engaged in various monumental commissions. Finally, they arrived on 12 December 1850 in Rome where Overbeck resided. They returned to Belgium with the intention to implement the ideals of the Nazarenes in Belgium.

=== First commissions ===
Upon their return in Belgium the two friends got married on the same day, 25 October 1852. The following year the two young artists were commissioned to provide the decoration for the Onze-Lieve-Vrouw-van-Bijstand-der-Christenenkerk (Church of Our Lady of Assistance to Christians) in Sint-Niklaas, which had been constructed in the early 1840s. The initiative came from a local member of parliament and a local politician and was initially funded by the local community of believers. When funds ran out, the Belgian state provided an annual stipend of 1,500 francs from 1856 to 1861. The funds were part of a scheme by the Belgian Government to promote monumental art in Belgium as it was regarded as useful in promoting nationalism and a revival of the arts in the young Belgian state.

Scene from the life of Gilbert van Schoonbeke

The two artists where the first to receive an official commission for a secular monumental project when the Antwerp city government asked them to paint the walls of the newly restored Old Bourse of Antwerp with depictions of Antwerp's glorious trading past. They were assisted by two students of the Antwerp Academy, the German Otto Schwerdgeburth and Florentinus Claes from Antwerp. These works were destroyed by fire just before the building was to be officially reopened.

=== Promoting monumental art ===
Swerts and Guffens were given funds by the Belgian government to attend a large exhibition of German art held in Munich in 1858 with the mission to report back. Their report conveniently concluded that monumental art should be supported as it was linked to religion and science, and was therefore national art. They also published a memoir on their trip to Germany under the title "Souvenirs d'un voyage artistique en Allemagne par J. Swerts et G. Guffens - Peintres d'Anvers" (Remembrances of an artistic trip to Germany by J. Swerts and G. Guffens, painters from Antwerp).

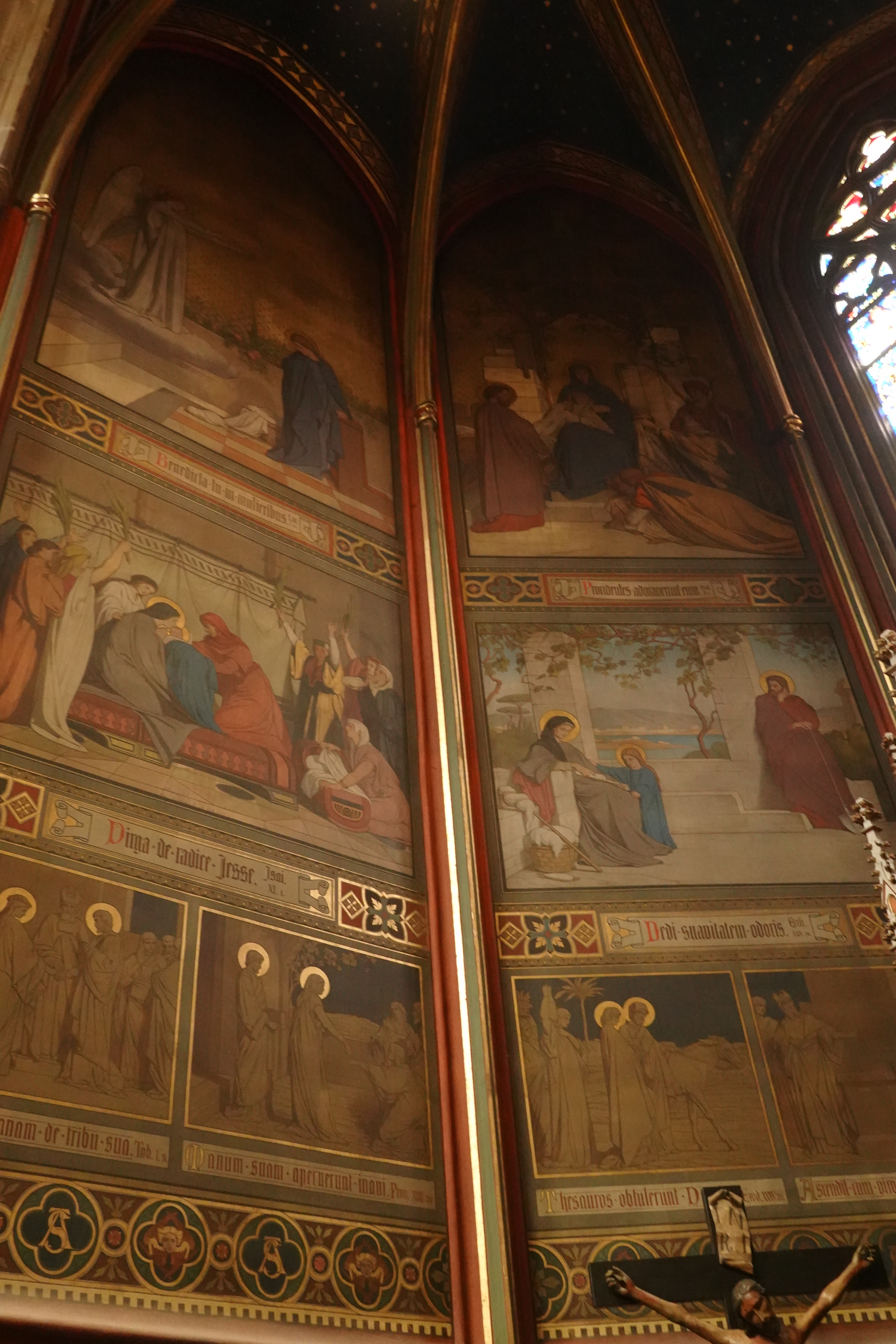
Frescos in the St. Vitus Cathedral, Prague

In 1859 Swerts and Guffens organized in Brussels and Antwerp an exhibition of modellos of German masters, which had an important influence on the development of monumental art in Belgium. While they were still working on the murals in the Onze-Lieve-Vrouw-van-Bijstand-der-Christenenkerk in Sint-Niklaas, Swerts and Guffens started on a mural in the Church of Saint George (Sint-Joriskerk) in Antwerp. This was the largest work that they had undertaken thus far and they worked on the project from 1859 to 1871. The support of the Belgian Government for monumental art was, however, waning as it was not considered to be sufficiently in the Flemish tradition with its vivid colours, life and movement.

Swerts and Godfrey Guffens received many commissions for murals with religious and historical subjects in the period from 1859 and 1871 including for the Saint Quentin Cathedral in Hasselt, the choir of the church of Lanaken, the choir of the Saint Joseph Church and the Saint Barbara Chapel in Louvain, the Chapel of the Aldermen in Ypres and the City Hall of Kortrijk.

=== Prague ===
When Belgian government commissions dried up, Swerts accepted the post of director of the Academy of Fine Arts in Prague in 1874. He was received with enthusiasm. His students in Prague included Vojtěch Bartoněk, Felix Jenewein, Mikoláš Aleš and František Ženíšek.

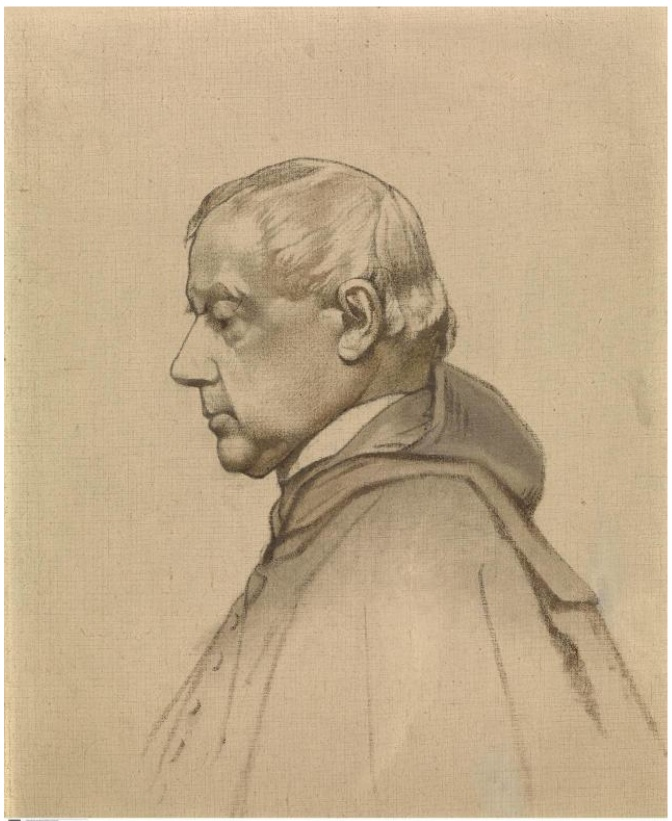
Cardinal Prince of Schwarzenberg

He met with personal tragedy when a son and his wife died in quick succession. He fell ill while working on murals in the Saint Anne Chapel of the St. Vitus Cathedral in Prague. He died on 11 August 1879 in Marienbad where he had gone for a cure.

== Work ==
The monumental art created by Jan Swerts and Guffens was very influential at the time and contributed to the spread of the Nazarene school's ideas in Belgium and beyond. Their work is now regarded as displaying the strengths and weaknesses of this school of painting: charm, simplicity of line but a cold appearance. The two artists also played a role as advisors on the practices for restoration of medieval art in Belgium.

Jozef Janssens (1854–1930), a painter of religious and genre paintings as well as of portraits and frescoes, was Swerts' pupil in Antwerp in 1872 and was heavily influenced by Swerts’ style.
