= Godfried Guffens =

Belgian painter

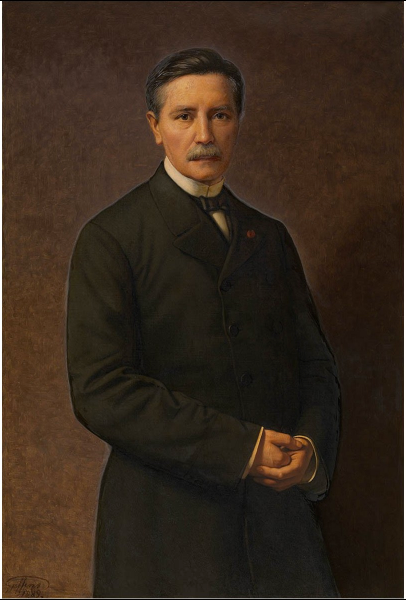
- Self-portrait (date unknown)
- Born: 22 August 1823; Hasselt, Belgium
- Died: 11 August 1901 (aged 77); Antwerp, belgium
- Education: Royal Academy of Fine Arts
- Occupation: Painter

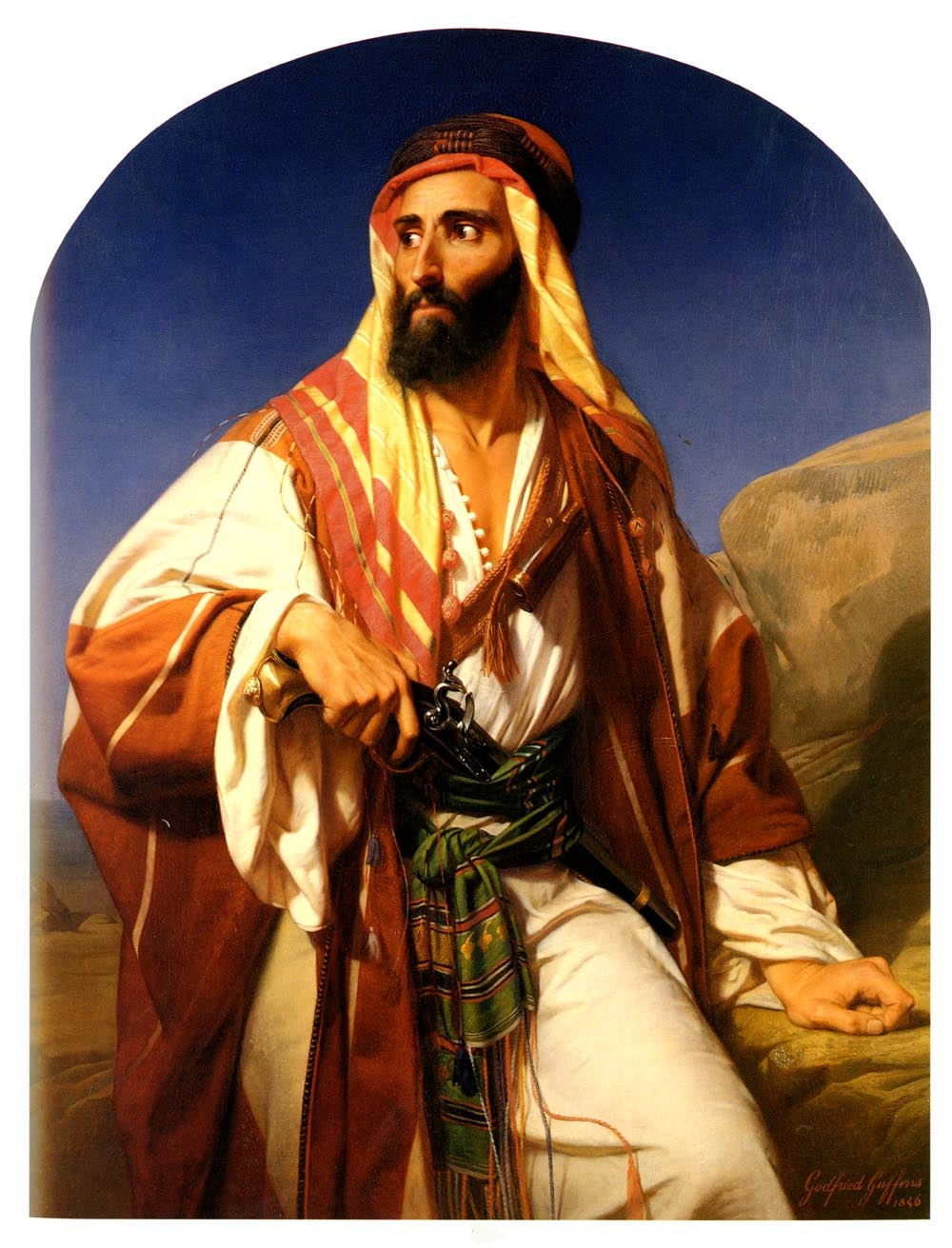
A Bedouin Chieftain (1846)

Egide Godfried Guffens (22 July 1823 – 11 July 1901) was a Belgian painter. He is best known for his monumental religious and historical murals.

== Life and work ==
He was born in Hasselt. When he was only fifteen, he was admitted to the Royal Academy of Fine Arts where he studied under Nicaise de Keyser. He later took a trip to Italy to see the works of Michelangelo and Raphael. While there, he met Johann Friedrich Overbeck, a member of the Nazarene movement, who had a decisive influence on his style. This prompted him to visit Germany and study the new types of mural painting that were developing there.

His largest mural is in the church of Saint George in Antwerp, which he painted together with Jan Swerts from 1859 to 1871. Some other prominent murals include those in the Town Halls of Kortrijk and Hasselt, the choir and bapistry of Saint Quentin's Cathedral and the choir of Saint Ursula's Church in Lanaken. His mural in the Ypres Cloth Hall was lost during World War I.

He was a member of the Academy of Fine Arts in Antwerp and the Royal Academy of Science, Letters and Fine Arts of Belgium. He was also a corresponding member of the Institut de France. In 1900, he suffered a stroke while teaching a class at the Academy and died the following year in Schaerbeek. Hasselt and Schaerbeek both have streets named after him.

== Honours ==
- 1885: Commander in the Order of Leopold.
