= Joseph Middeleer =

Belgian painter and aquarellist

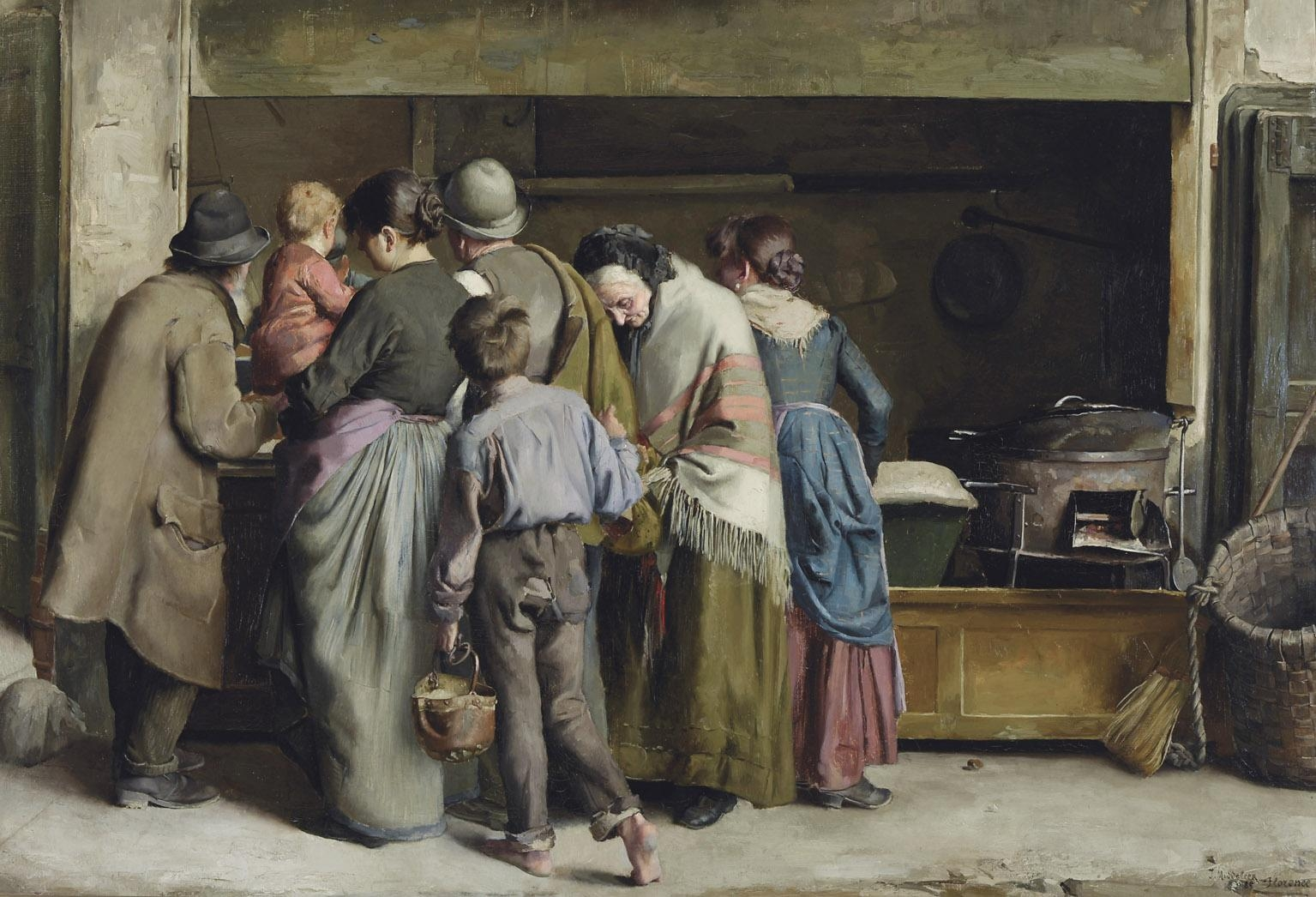
Food stall in Florence

Joseph Middeleer (Ixelles, 1865 – Assebroek, 1934 or 1939) was a Belgian painter and aquarellist known for his genre scenes, figures, landscapes and still lifes. He was an academically trained artist whose style and themes reflected initially the retro genre style of Belgian Romantic-historical painting. He also dealt with social realist themes and in the 1890s he painted a number of symbolist works.

== Life ==
Joseph Middeleer was born in Elsene or Ixelles near Brussels. He studied at the Académie Royale des Beaux-Arts of Brussels. He also attended the private art studio of Franz Meerts, a painter of genre scenes.

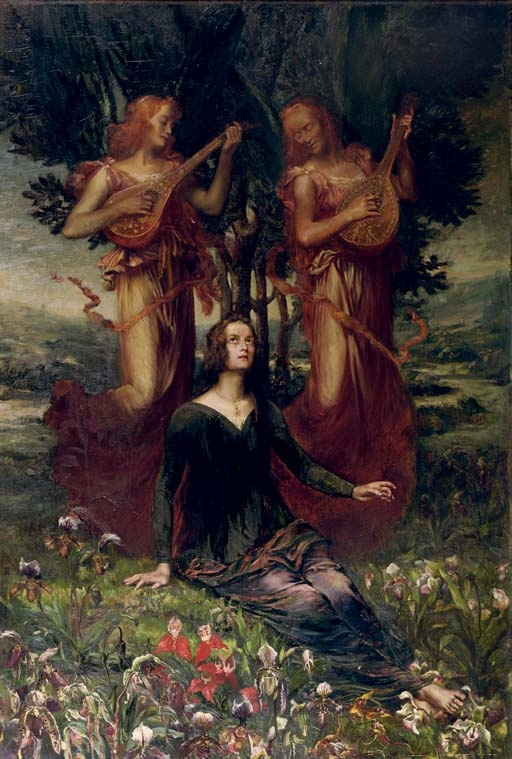
Inspiration: Enchanting angels

Middeleer was a member of two artistic associations in Brussels. The first one was L'Union des Arts that existed from 1876 to 1885 and organised group exhibitions of works of visual artists. Three of such exhibitions were held, all in the personal studio of Middeleer's master Franz Meerts. They were not particularly successful. Other members of this association included Louis Baretta, Marie De Bièvre, Charles Defreyn, Jules Dujardin, Joseph Flameng, Ernest Hoerickx, Louis Ludwig, Léon Massaux, René Ovyn, Emile Rimbout, Pieter Stobbaerts, Flori Van Acker and Henri Van der Taelen.

After the L'Union des Arts became defunct, Middeleer was together with Franz Meerts and others a co-founder of a new association for young artists, which was given the Dutch name Voorwaarts ('Forward') in 1885. Co-founder was Louis Baretta. The motto was: Hooger is ons doel ('Higher is our goal'). What is remarkable is both the Dutch-language name of the circle and the Dutch-language motto. The blazon of Voorwaarts was designed by Middeleer. The members of Voorwaarts included Ernest Hoerickx, Léon Massaux, Emile Rimbout, Jan Stobbaerts, Pieter Stobbaerts, Eugène Surinx, Flori van Acker and Camille Wauters. Later, others joined including Theodoor Verstraete, Emile Claus, Adrien-Joseph Heymans, Gustave Vanaise, Alfred Verhaeren, Victor Gilsoul, Eugène Laermans, August De Bats, Henri Ottevaere and Emile Van Doren. The first salon was held in 1885 in the IJzerenkruistraat in the bustling heart of Brussels. In 1888, Voorwaarts exhibited in the Royal Museums of Fine Arts of Belgium in Brussels. The association ceased to exist in 1893.

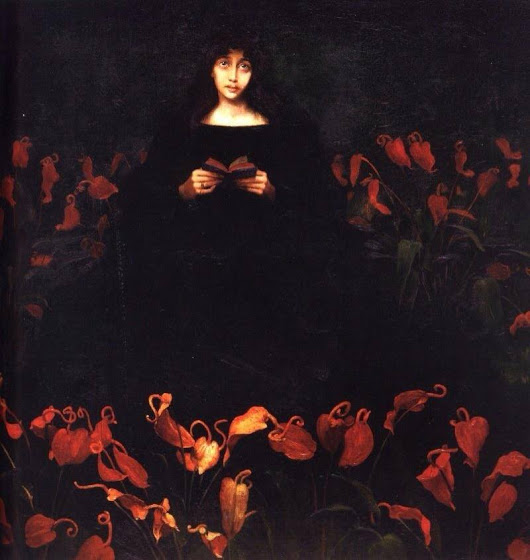
The demoniac

Middeleer joined the Cercle des aquarellistes et des aquafortistes belges (Circle of aquarellists and etchers), which had been founded in 1883. Middeleer won the prize for practical arts of the Académie royale des sciences, des lettres et des beaux-arts de Belgique in 1887. He was involved in a few restoration projects. He was asked to restore the 16th century murals in the St Martinus Church of Meise rediscovered in 1895. He used an unusual fresco technique by making the restoration on a ribbed rather than a flat surface. His work was praised for the fact that the restored frescos could not be distinguished from the original works. He also added two new frescos in the style of the old frescos.

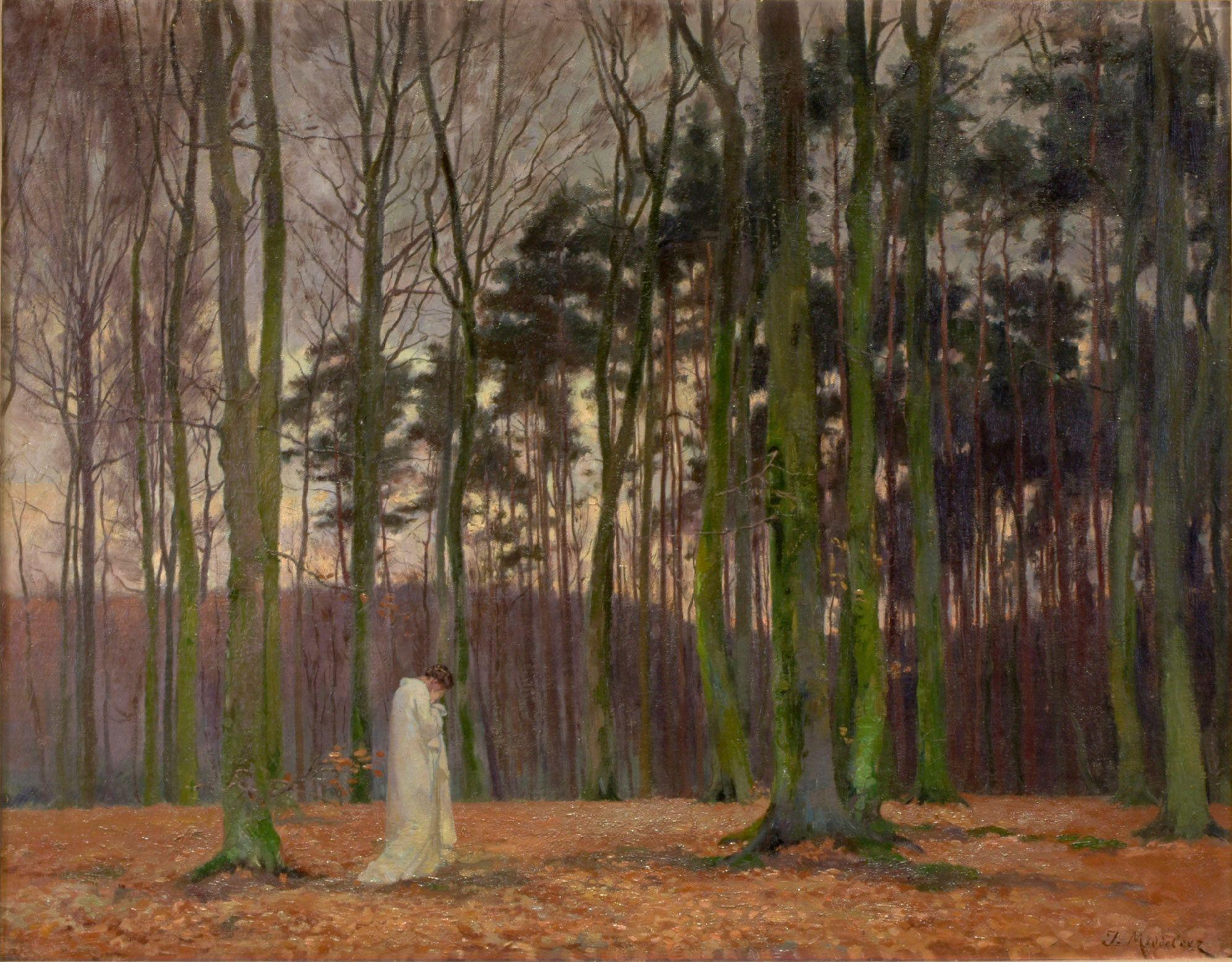
Melancholy

Middeleer participated in the salons of L'Art idéaliste starting from 1896. The initiative for these salons was taken by Jean Delville, a symbolist painter, author and Theosophist. Delville supported idea-based art which expresses philosophical ideals derived from contemporary hermetic and esoteric traditions. The idealist movement was against impressionism and realism in art. Around this time Middeleer also started painting symbolist paintings such as Inspiration Enchanting angels. These works are also close to those of the Pre-Raphaelites. He also participated in the so-called 'Gestes Esthétiques' between 1892 and 1897 together with, among others, Fernand Khnopff. These symbolist art salons were initiated by the Frenchman Joseph Péladan. Péladan regarded art to be of divine origin. Middeleer was influenced by this line of thought as is evident from the prominent presence of the Christ figure on several of his drawings. A well-known symbolic painting by Middeleer is The demoniac that is sometimes compared to Fernand Khnopff's Sleeping Medusa.

Middeleer illustrated the three-volume publication L'art flamand written by Jules Dujardin, published in 1896. Middeleer made 1,500 pen drawings illustrating art works of the old masters for this publication on the history of Flemish art.

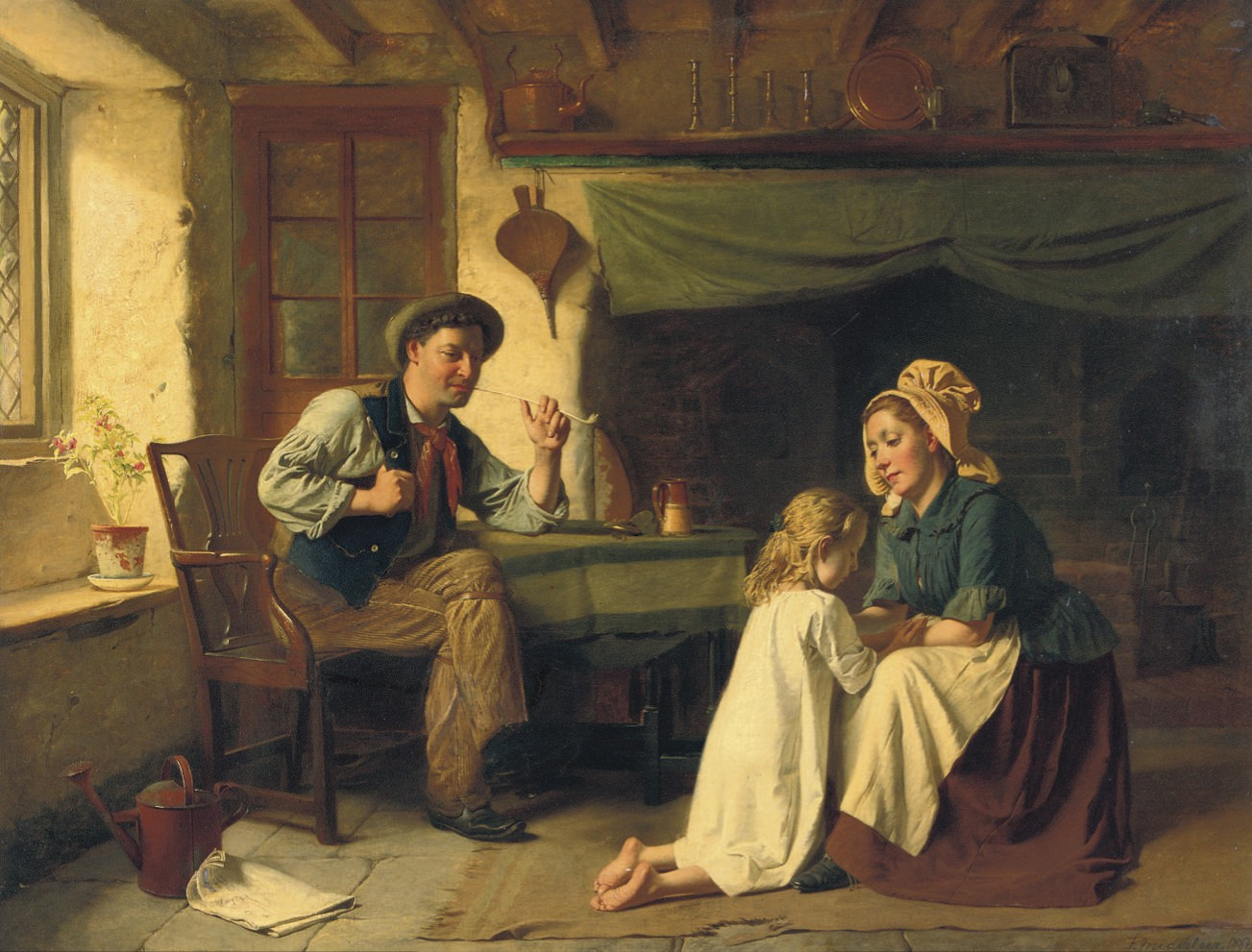
The darling daughter

He accompanied his master Franz Meerts to Florence in Italy, to assist him in copying the large Portinari Altarpiece of Hugo van der Goes. The copy had been commissioned by the Belgian government. In 1904 Middeleer moved to the countryside of Assebroek near Bruges.

Joseph Middeleer died in Assebroek in 1934 or 1939.

== Work ==
Joseph Middeleer is known for his genre scenes, figures, landscapes and still lifes. He was an academically trained artist whose style and themes reflected initially the retro genre style of Belgian Romantic-historical painting, with its preference for genre scenes placed in a 16-17th century environment. He initially also dealt with social realist themes and in the 1890s he painted a number of symbolist works. In his later life he painted idyllic city views and landscapes often from Bruges or its environment.
