= Alfred Verhaeren =

Belgian painter

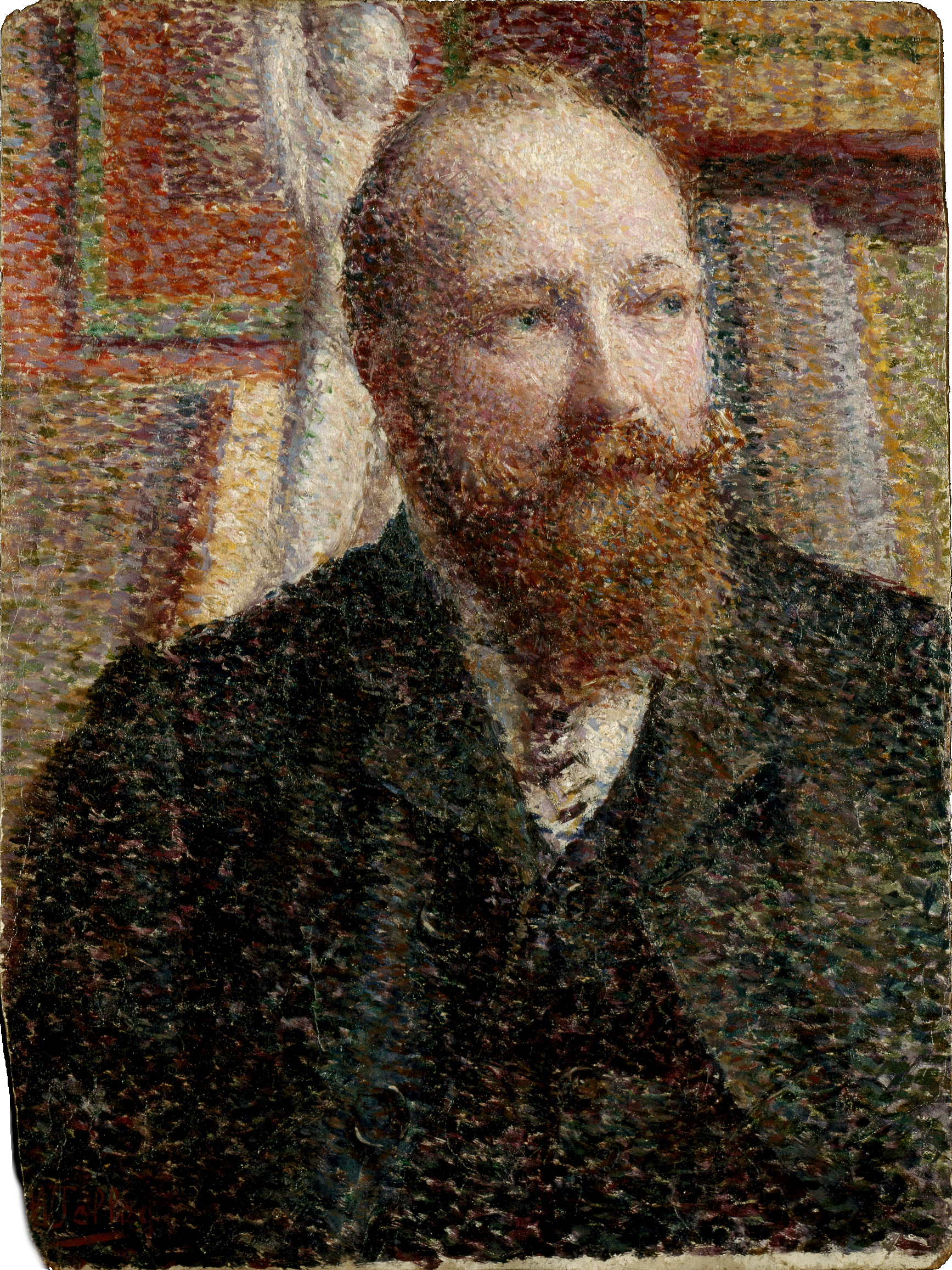
Portrait of Alfred Verhaeren by William Jelley, circa 1890

Alfred Verhaeren, full name Alfred Jean Baptiste Marie Verhaeren (Brussels, 8 October 1849 – Ixelles, 10 February 1924) was a Belgian painter known for his portraits, interior scenes, architectural paintings and still lifes. He was an active member of various avant-garde artist groups in Belgium. He participated in the second wave of Belgian Realism and was later influenced by Impressionism.

== Life ==
Alfred Verhaeren was born in Brussels as the son of Louis Eugène Henri Gérard Verhaeren, commissioner at the Ministry of Finance. and Marie Nathalie Crabbe. He was a second cousin of the poet Émile Verhaeren. His father placed him with a prominent architect where he trained in drawing up plans and designs. Driven by his keen interest in art, he abandoned the architect's office to enroll at the Académie Royale des Beaux-Arts of Brussels where his teachers included Jean-François Portaels and Louis Dubois. He studied still lifes by the old masters to perfect his technique. In 1872, he exhibited a still life in Brussels, which was purchased by King Leopold II of Belgium.

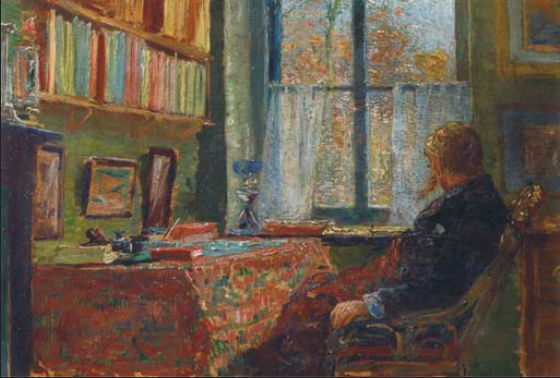
Lost in thoughts

Verhaeren became a member of the artist group La Chrysalide founded in Brussels in 1875. Its members included James Ensor, Constantin Meunier and Frans Van Leemputten. La Chrysalide held its first exhibition in 1876 and its last one in 1881. Verhaeren remained independent for a while after La Chrysalide became inactive until he joined the artist group Cercle Pour l'Art. In October 1880 he married Augusta Bonnier, who came from a wealthy family. The couple had four children. Financially secure, he was able to devote himself to painting.

He exhibited at the annual exhibitions of the Brussels-based Les XX, an association of avant-garde artists founded in 1883 who sought to free themselves from the monopoly of the Salon system with its juries and prizes. The group organized annual exhibitions of its members' works, which also featured pieces by foreign avant-garde artists.

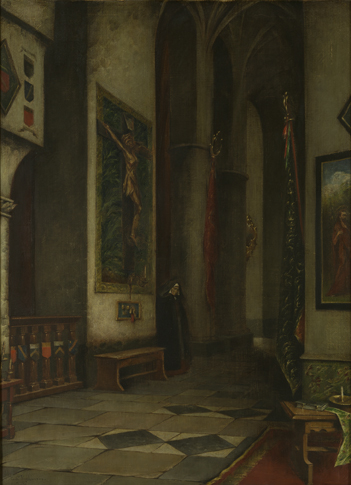
Interior of a church

In 1885 he joined an association for young artists, which took the Dutch-language name Voorwaarts ('Forward'). Co-founders were Franz Meerts and Louis Baretta. Its motto was: Hooger is ons doel ('Higher is our goal'). What is remarkable is both the Dutch-language name of the association and the Dutch-language motto. Its members included Ernest Hoerickx, Léon Massaux, Emile Rimbout, Jan Stobbaerts, Pieter Stobbaerts, Eugène Surinx, Flori van Acker and Camille Wauters. Later others joined including Theodoor Verstraete, Emile Claus, Adrien-Joseph Heymans, Gustave Vanaise, Victor Gilsoul, Eugène Laermans, August De Bats, Henri Ottevaere and Emile Van Doren. The first salon of Voorwaarts was held in 1885 in the IJzerenkruistraat in the bustling heart of Brussels. In 1888 Voorwaarts exhibited in the Royal Museums of Fine Arts of Belgium in Brussels. The association ceased to exist in 1893.

Verhaeren participated in numerous exhibitions: in Paris in 1889, in Berlin in 1891 and at the Maison des Arts in Brussels in 1896. At the Exposition Universelle (1900) he won a silver medal.

Alfred Verhaeren died in Ixelles on 10 February 1924.

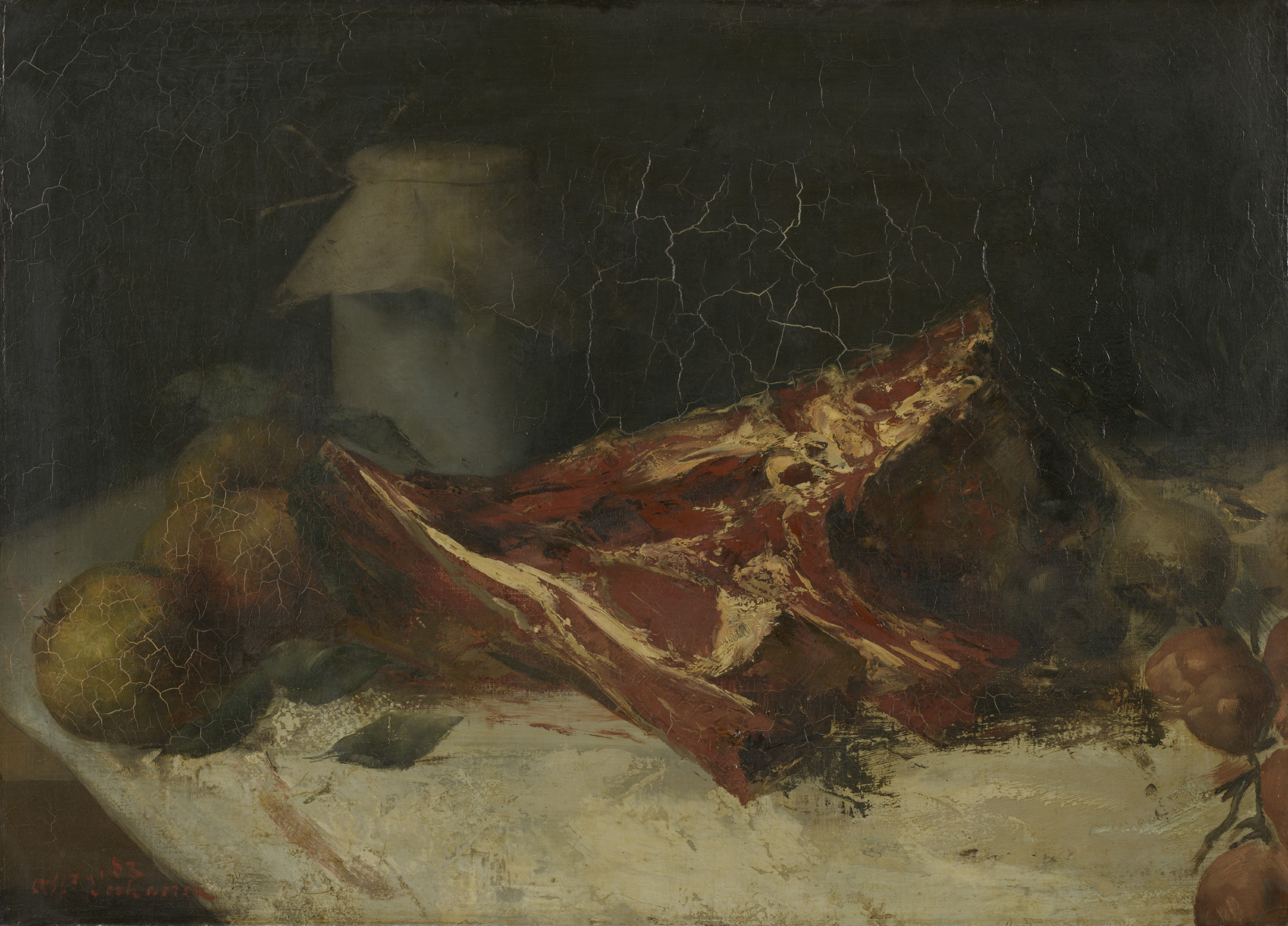
Still Life with a Rib Eye Steak

== Work ==
Verhaeren is known for his portraits, interior scenes, architectural paintings and still lifes. He was a member of the second wave of Belgian Realism and was later influenced by Impressionism.

Verhaeren used a very personal technique: his intense and bright tones are heavily impasted while the surface of the painting, slightly crushed, has the appearance of enamel.
