= Franz Meerts =

Belgian painter and aquarellist

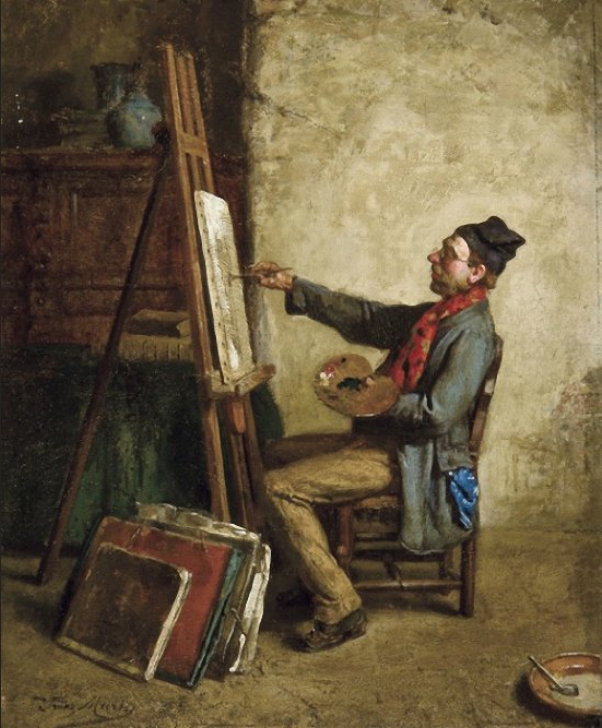
Self-portrait at the easel

Franz Meerts or Frans Meerts (Ghent, 1836 – Brussels, May 1896) was a Belgian painter and aquarellist known for his interior scenes, genre scenes, still lifes and landscapes. He was also active as an author, publisher and copyist.

== Life ==
Franz Meerts was born in Ghent. He studied in his home town at the Academy of Fine Arts of Ghent. Meerts later moved to Brussels, where he attended the private art studio of Jean-François Portaels, a prominent painter of genre scenes, biblical stories, landscapes, portraits and Orientalist subjects and the founder of the Belgian Orientalist school. Portaels trained in his private art studio the next generation of Belgian painters.

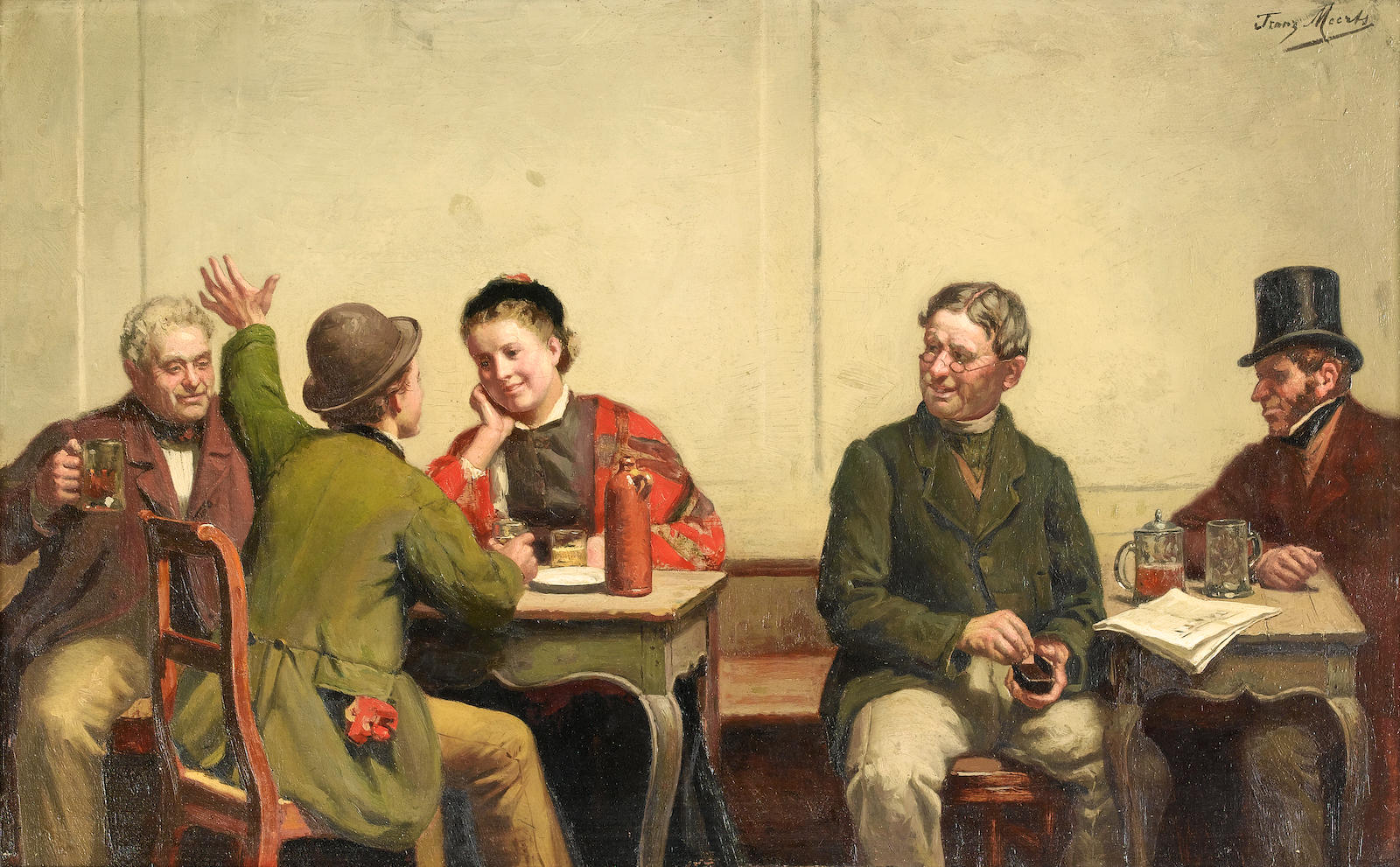
At the café

Meerts was commissioned by the Belgian government to travel to Spain and Italy to copy the works of the great masters. On the occasion of these trips, he studied the technique of the fresco. He also received a commission from the city council of Louvain to copy works of Dirck Bouts for the Leuven Town Hall. He completed the works in 1899-1890. He spent the last years of his life restoring the murals of St. Peter's Church in Anderlecht (Brussels).

Meerts was the co-founder of two artist associations in Brussels. The first one was L'Union des Arts that existed from 1876 to 1885 and organised group exhibitions of works of visual artists. Three of such exhibitions were held, all in the personal studio of Meerts. They were not particularly successful. Members of this association included Louis Baretta, Marie De Bièvre, Charles Defreyn, Jules Dujardin, Joseph Flameng, Ernest Hoerickx, Louis Ludwig, Léon Massaux, Joseph Middeleer, René Ovyn, Emile Rimbout, Pieter Stobbaerts, Flori Van Acker and H. Van der Taelen.

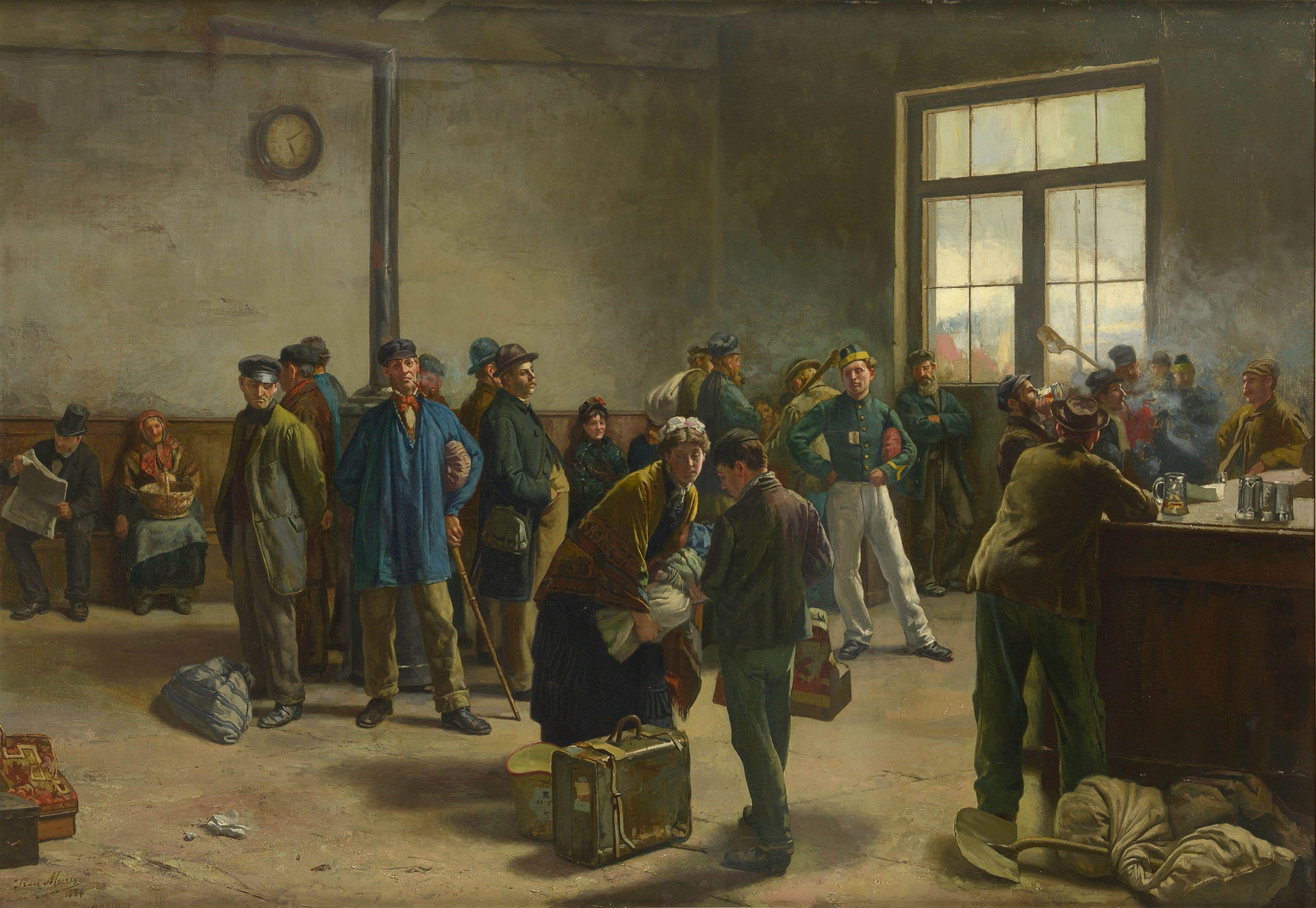
View of a third-class waiting room

Franz Meerts subsequently co-founded a new association for young artists, which was given the Dutch name Voorwaarts ('Forward') in 1885. Co-founder was Louis Baretta. Its motto was: Hooger is ons doel ('Higher is our goal'). What is remarkable is both the Dutch-language name of the association and the Dutch-language motto. Its members included Ernest Hoerickx, Léon Massaux, Emile Rimbout, Jan Stobbaerts, Pieter Stobbaerts, Eugène Surinx, Flori van Acker and Camille Wauters. Later others joined including Theodoor Verstraete, Emile Claus, Adrien-Joseph Heymans, Gustave Vanaise, Alfred Verhaeren, Victor Gilsoul, Eugène Laermans, August De Bats, Henri Ottevaere and Emile Van Doren. The first salon of Voorwaarts was held in 1885 in the IJzerenkruistraat in the bustling heart of Brussels. In 1888, Voorwaarts exhibited in the Royal Museums of Fine Arts of Belgium in Brussels. The association ceased to exist in 1893.

For more than twenty years, Meerts was the director of the Art Academy of Soignies. He was a co-author of "La Belgique illustrée", an illustrated history and overview of Belgium. Joseph Middeleer was his pupil.

Franz Meerts died in May 1896 in Brussels.

== Work ==
Franz Meerts is known for his interior scenes, genre scenes, still lifes and landscapes.

His genre scenes often depicted Catholic clergy and monks and notaries and lawyers in their offices. These works are characterised by their humorous or sentimental touch and their pleasant colors.

== Gallery ==
Works of Franz Meerts

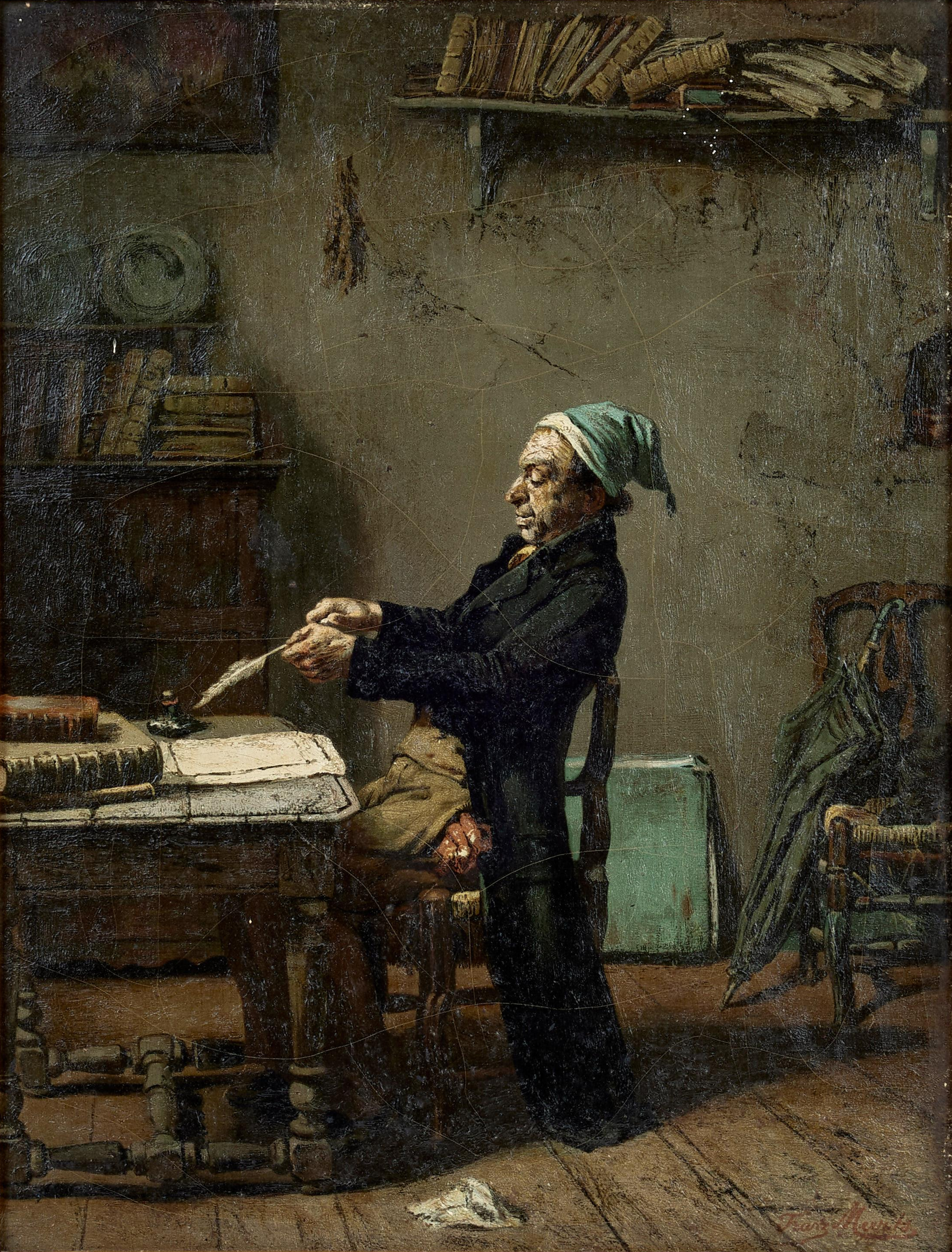
The old attorney

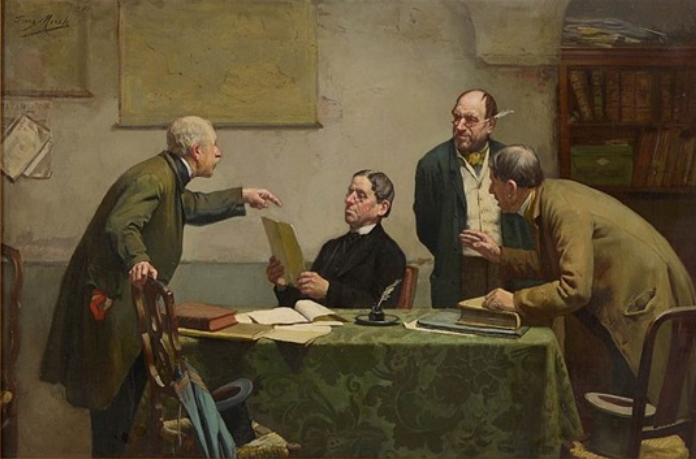
Meeting at the notary's

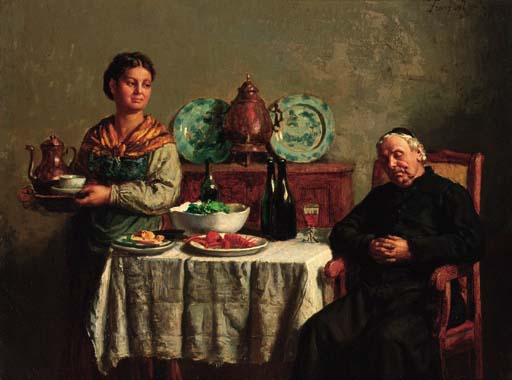
A good lunch

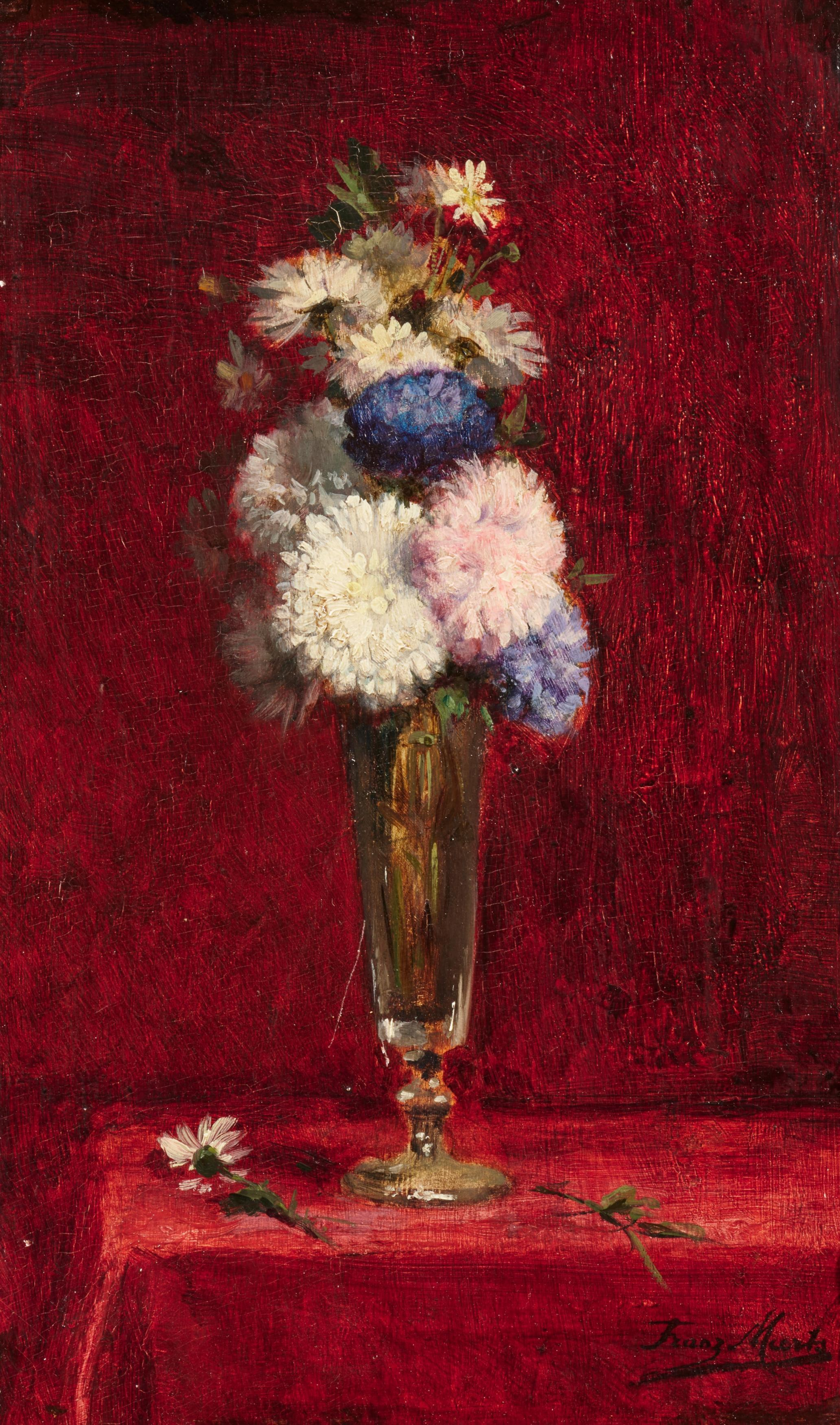
Chrysanthemums
