= Cassiers =

Cassiers may refer to

- Henri Cassiers (1858–1944), Belgian illustrator
- Guy Cassiers (born 1960), Belgian theatre director

== See also ==
- Cassier's Magazine, 1891 to 1913
