= Flori van Acker =

Belgian painter (1858–1940)

Flori Van Acker
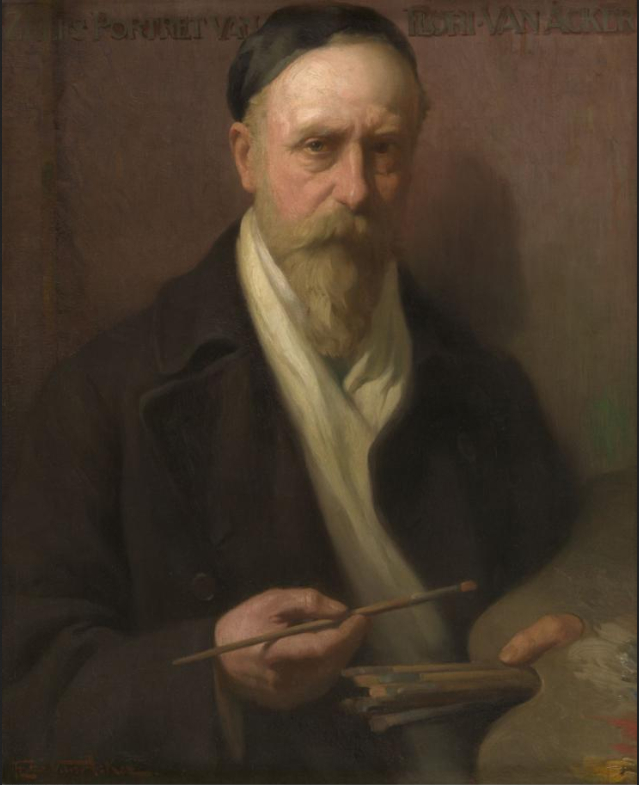
- Self-portrait, c. 1940, collection Groeningemuseum
- Born: 6 April 1858, Bruges
- Died: 14 March 1940, Bruges
- Known for: Painting

Flori Van Acker or Florimond Marie Van Acker (6 April 1858 – 14 March 1940) was a neo-romantic, impressionist Belgian painter, engraver, stamp designer and director of the Academy of Bruges.

== Life ==
Flori van Acker was born in Bruges in 1858. His father was a wool trader. Flori van Acker studied at the Academy in Bruges with Bruno Van Hollebeke and Edward Wallaeys, later at the Antwerp academy with Charles Verlat and from 1879 at the Academy of Brussels with Jean-François Portaels and history painter Joseph Stallaert.

In line with the trend towards realism of the time, he went to live in the fishing town Knokke in 1882 where he made paintings of the life of the fishermen. There was a large artist colony in Knokke at time which included Alfred Verwee, Louis Artan, Firmin Baes, Richard Baseleer, Alfred Bastien, Henri Cassiers, Franz Courtens and Paul-Jean Clays.

In 1883 he came Second in the Belgian Prix de Rome. After several years of travel which took him, among others to the United Kingdom, France and Germany, he settled in Brussels. Here he became friends with Jan Toorop and Jean Delville. He held an exhibition in Brussels with L'Union des Arts ('The Union of the Arts'), a Brussels-based association of artists that existed from 1876 to 1885. In 1885 he was a co-founder, together with Franz Meerts and Joseph Middeleer of the Brussels art circle 'Voorwaarts' ('Forward'), a regrouping of the defunct "L'Union des Arts".

In 1887 he returned to Bruges, where he was a teacher at the local Academy. In 1910 he became director of this institution, a position he retained until 1926. During that period he also contributed to the revival of Bruges pottery. He further made designs for Gustaaf Pickery, a sculptor from Bruges.

== Work ==
Van Acker was a painter of Bruges cityscapes and popular neighborhoods, landscapes, genre scenes, the life of the fisherman, historical scenes religious works and portraits. He was a very prolific designer of posters. As an amateur photographer, he was an active member of Bruges' Cercle Photographique.

His students included the modernist painter José Storie and his nephew Alfred Joseph Auguste van Neste.

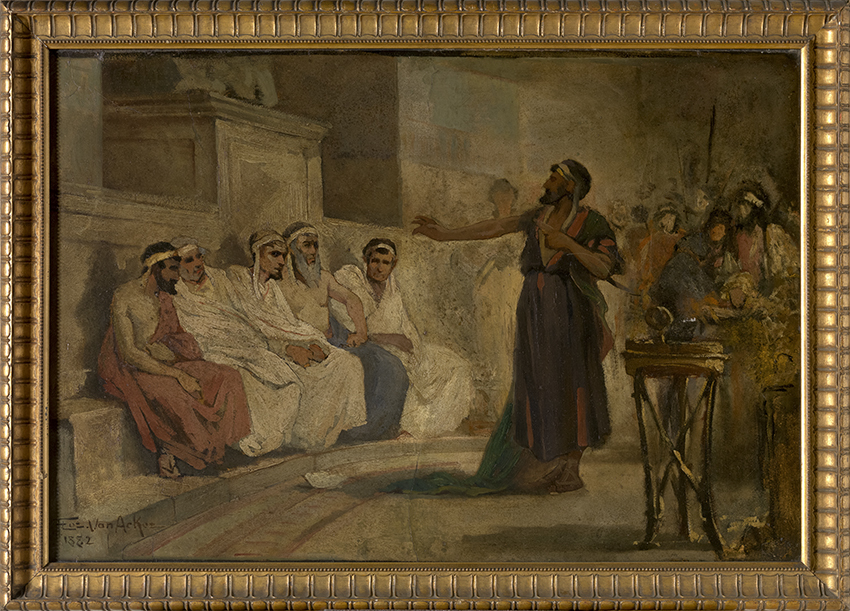
Saint Paul at the Areopagus, 1882, Groeningemuseum, Brugge

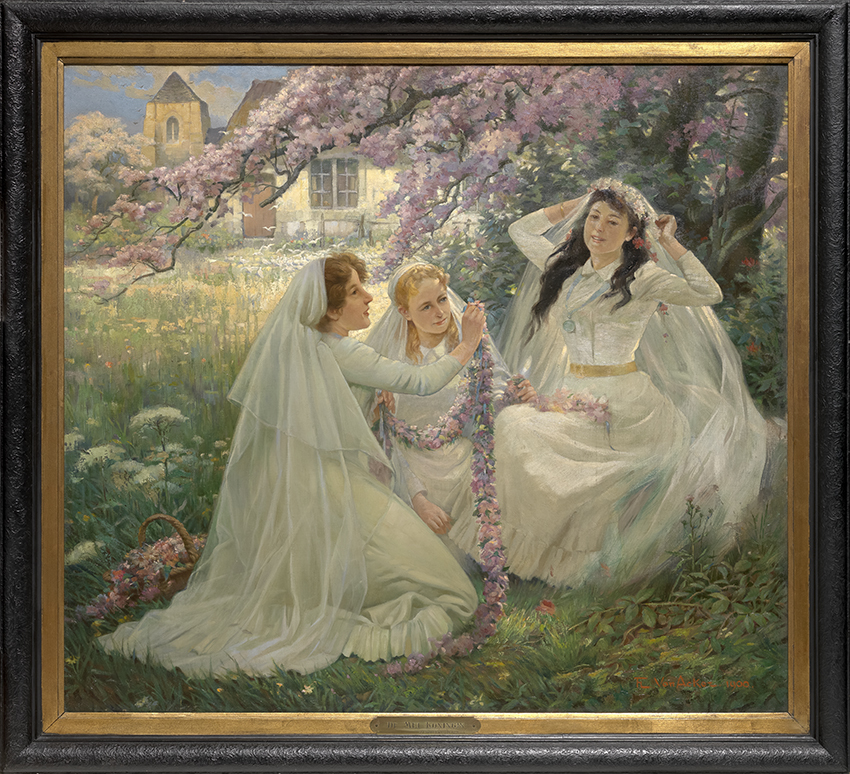
De meikoningin, 1900 Groeningemuseum, Brugge

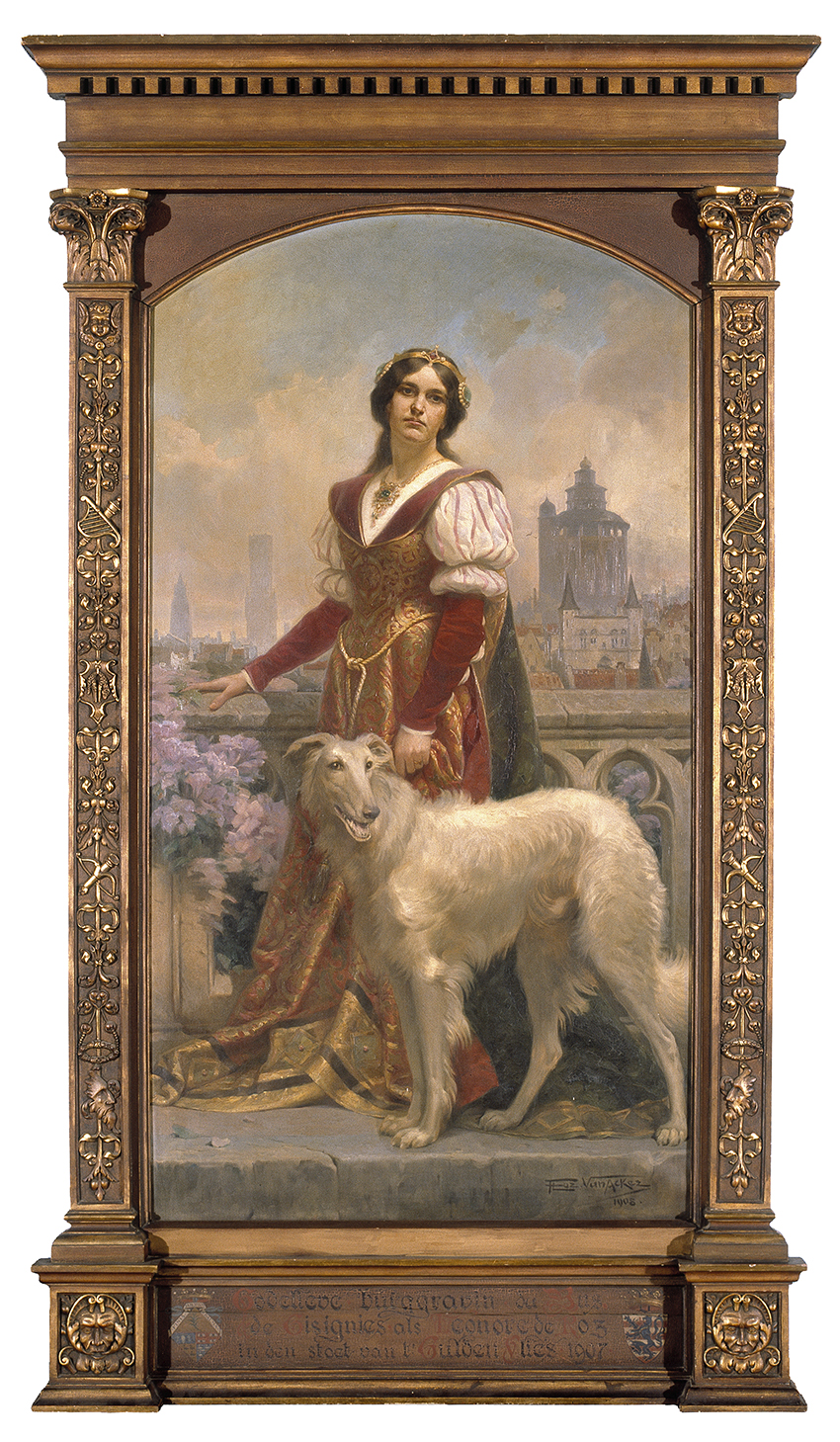
Portrait of Godelieve du Bus de Gésignies, 1908, Groeningemuseum, Brugge

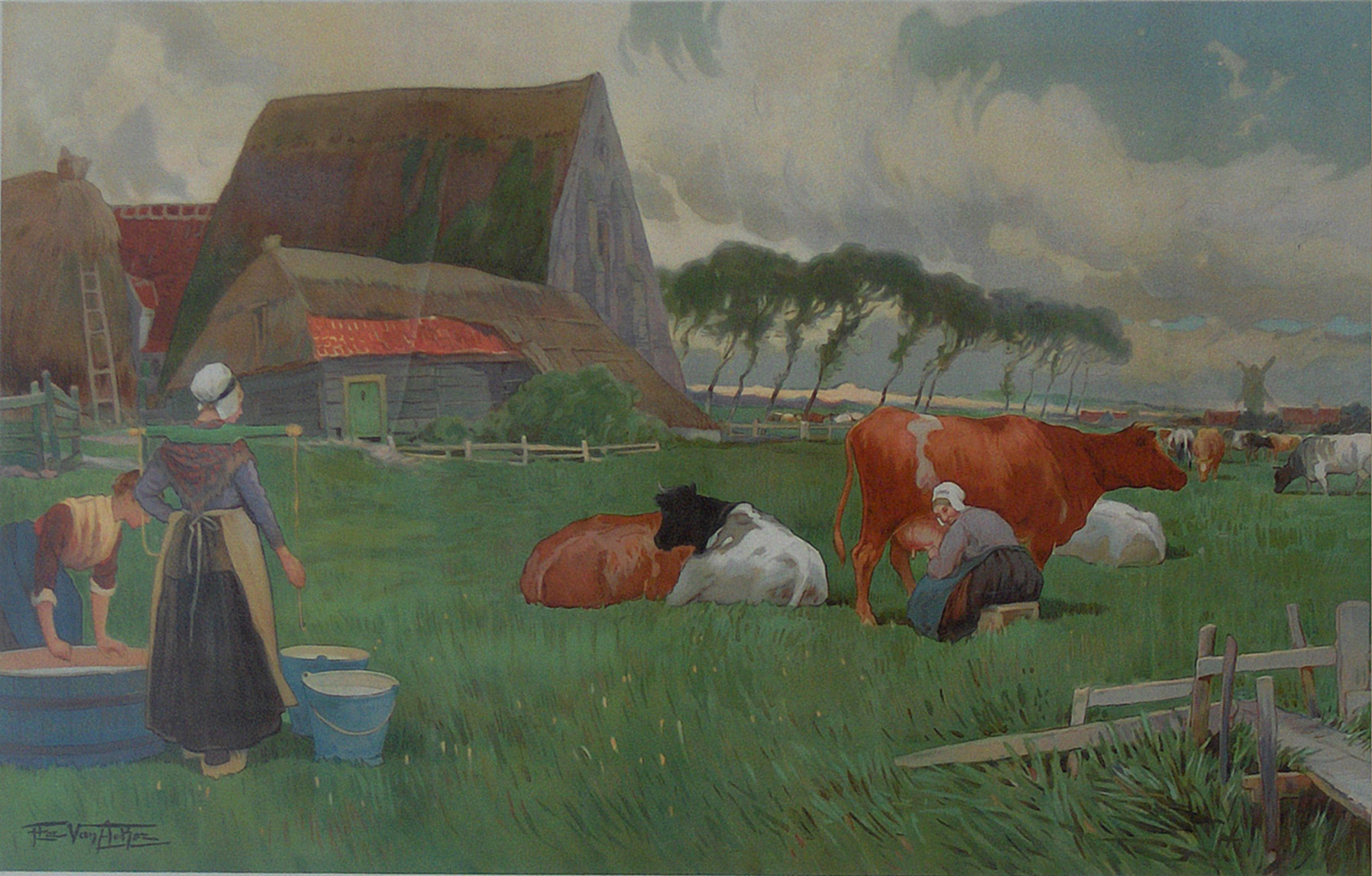
Veurne-Ambacht
