= Henri Cassiers =

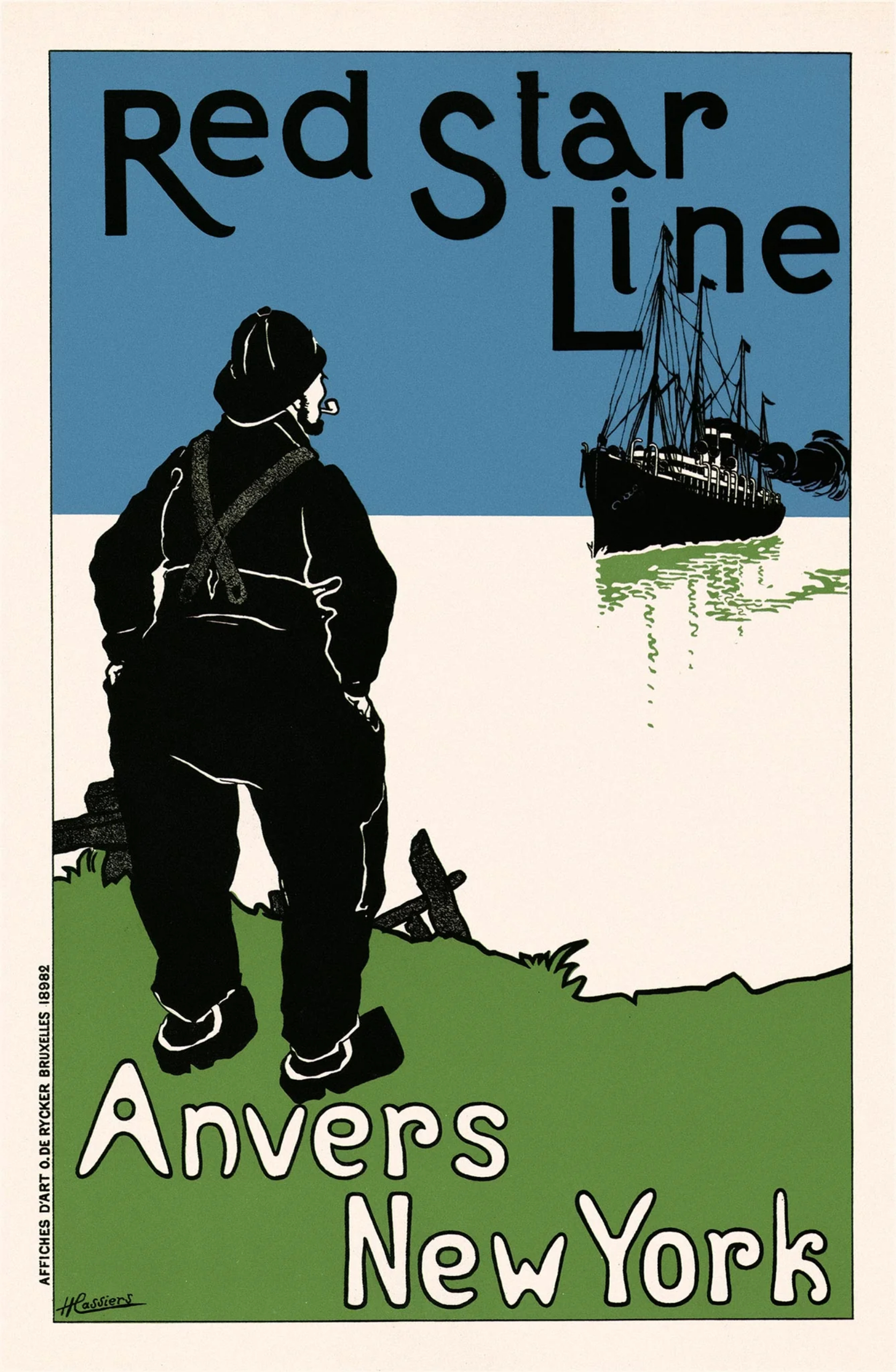
Red Star Line Poster

Henri Paul Émile Victor Cassiers, also known as Henry and Hendrick Cassiers (Antwerp, 11 August 1858 - Ixelles - Elsene, 27 February 1944) was a Belgian Art Nouveau artist and illustrator.

== Early life ==
Born in Antwerp in 1858, Cassiers was the son of Paul Cassiers and Victoire Pelgrims. He studied architecture in Brussels with Paul Saintenoy for six years. He also took courses at the Royal Academy of Fine Arts in Brussels and other schools. Largely self-taught as a painter in watercolours, he became a skilful draughtsman. In 1881, he had his first exhibition of paintings, which went well, and gave up on architecture.

At about this time, Cassiers went to live in the fishing town of Knokke, where there was a large artist colony which included Alfred Verwee, Louis Artan, Flori van Acker, Franz Courtens, and later Alfred Bastien and Firmin Baes.

== Career ==
After 1881, Cassiers continued to exhibit and to travel. He had successful exhibitions in Brittany, England, Switzerland, Germany, Italy, and other countries. He established his focus on commercial illustration, and his work was featured in well-known newspapers, magazines, hotels, restaurants, and resorts.

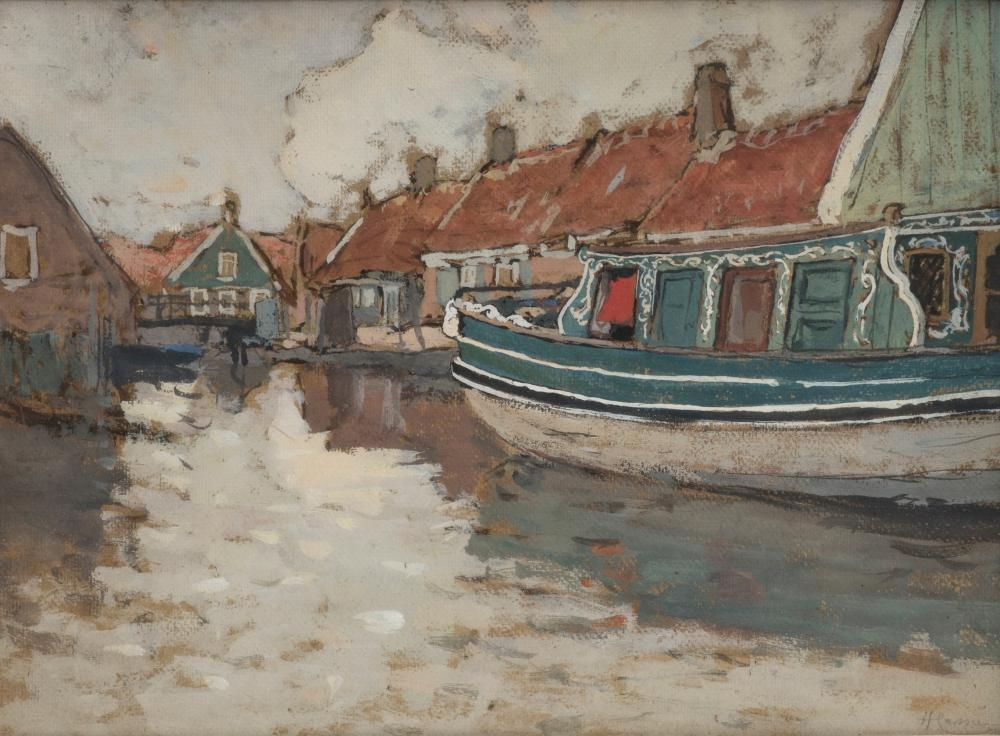
Dutch sailing village

He designed many posters, notably for the Red Star Line, a shipping company of Antwerp, his main client. For some twenty-five years he designed its posters, postcards, and menus.

Some of his most notable work was for Le Patriot Illustré, and his posters include several for the seaside town of De Haan. He also designed postcards.

Cassiers has been called the most outstanding Flemish poster artist of the period.
