= Jan Stobbaerts =

Belgian painter and printmaker

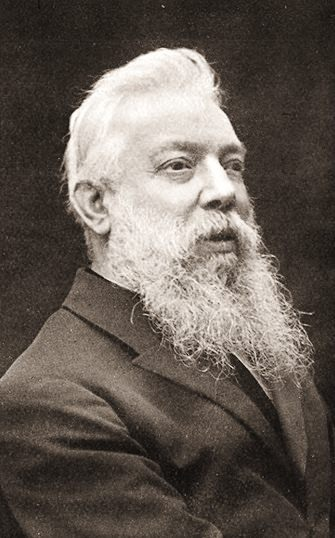
Portrait of Jan Stobbaerts, c. 1900

Jan Stobbaerts or Jan-Baptist Stobbaerts (18 March 1838 – 25 November 1914) was a Belgian painter and printmaker. He is known for his scenes with animals, landscapes, genre scenes and portraits or artists. With his dark-brown studio tones and forceful depiction of trivial subjects, Stobbaerts was a pioneer of Realism and 'autochthonous' Impressionism in Belgium.

== Life ==
Jan Stobbaerts was born in Antwerp as the son of the carpenter Maarten Jozef Stobbarts and his wife Johanna Rosalie Pardon. Orphaned at the age of 6, Stobbaerts was cared for by various poor family members and remained unschooled. When he was 8 he became an apprentice of a joiner and later changed to another boss who specialized in making covers of tobacco boxes. Later he worked as an assistant of a decorative painter. He started to paint his own compositions, which he sold on the street. He became a pupil of the animal painter Emmanuel Noterman in 1856.

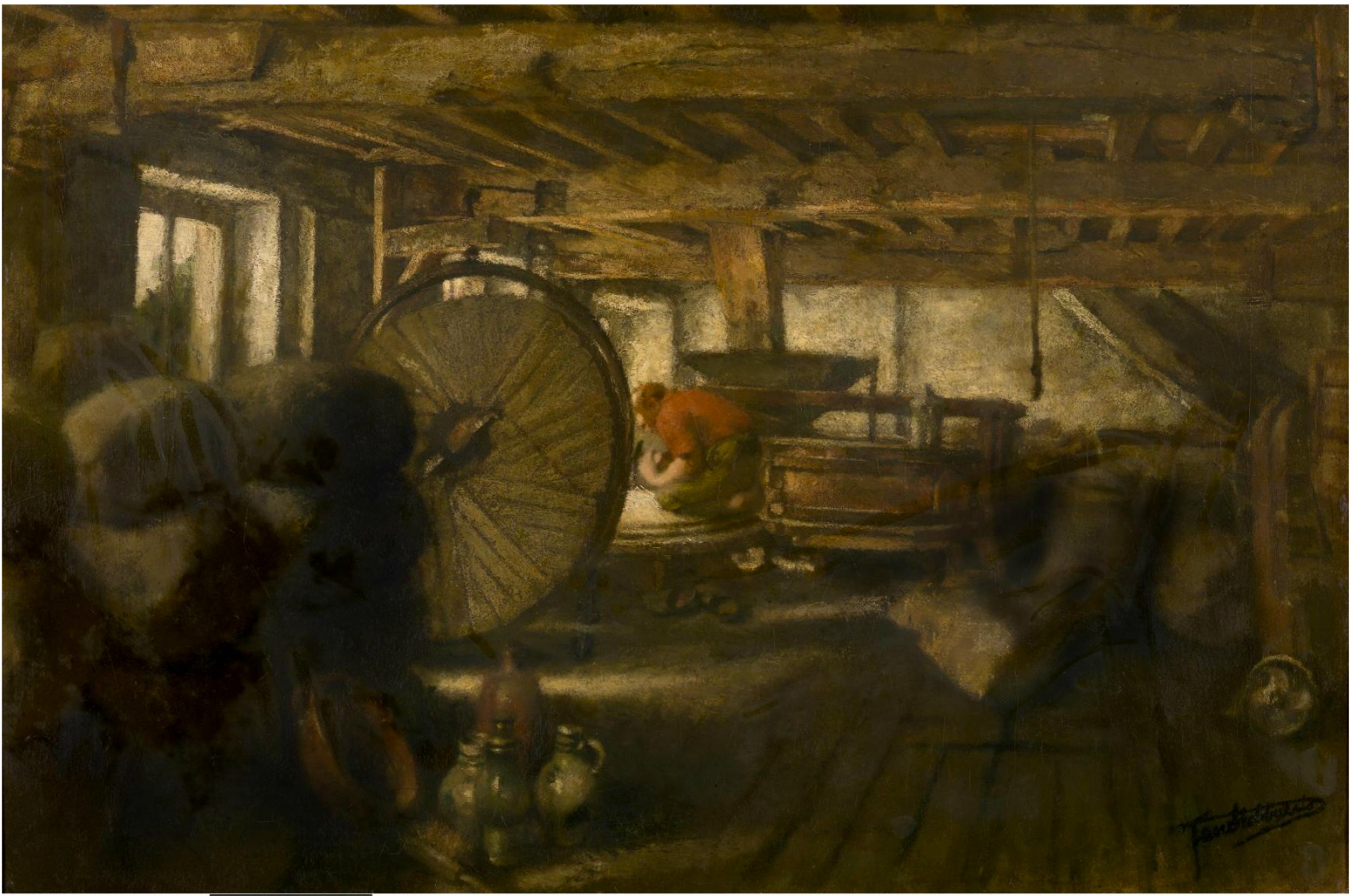
The interior of a windmill

Stobbaerts contributed his first painting to the Brussels Salon in 1857. His submission to the Salon was received well by the critics and was purchased by a British buyer. He started to contribute to all salons in Belgium from that time onwards.

In his early works, Stobbaerts worked from nature and he was thus one of the pioneers of non-academic painting. In 1859 he started attending the evening classes at the Academy of Fine Arts of Antwerp. Here he met Henri de Braekeleer who became a lifelong friend and fellow rebel against academism in art. Their rebellious attitude caused both of them to be expelled from the Academy. The uncle of de Braekeleer was Henri Leys, the leading Romantic painter in Belgium at the time. Leys took it upon himself to assist his nephew and Stobbaerts in the continuation of their training.

Stobbaerts married in 1868 and he led a relatively sedentary life in his native Antwerp. He never left his country and only traveled in the immediate vicinity of his residence to paint the surrounding landscape of the Campine. In 1886 Stobbaerts moved to Brussels. In this city he was recognized as an important artist unlike in his native Antwerp where he often had conflicts with local art critics and organizers of exhibitions. His composition entitled The stable of the old farm of Cruyninghen, which had been refused for the Antwerp Salon in 1885, was purchased by the Belgian state the next year for the Royal Museums of Fine Arts of Belgium. In Brussels Stobbaerts was feted by 'Les XX' (The Twenty), an association of 20 progressive artists in Brussels. Les XX invited Stobbaerts to participate in the Salon of 1884 organised by them. Leading art collectors in Belgium such as Henri Van Cutsem started collecting his work. While living in Schaerbeek near Brussels, he painted scenes in the Osseghem/Ossegem neighborhood of Molenbeek-Saint-Jean and around the Woluwe river.

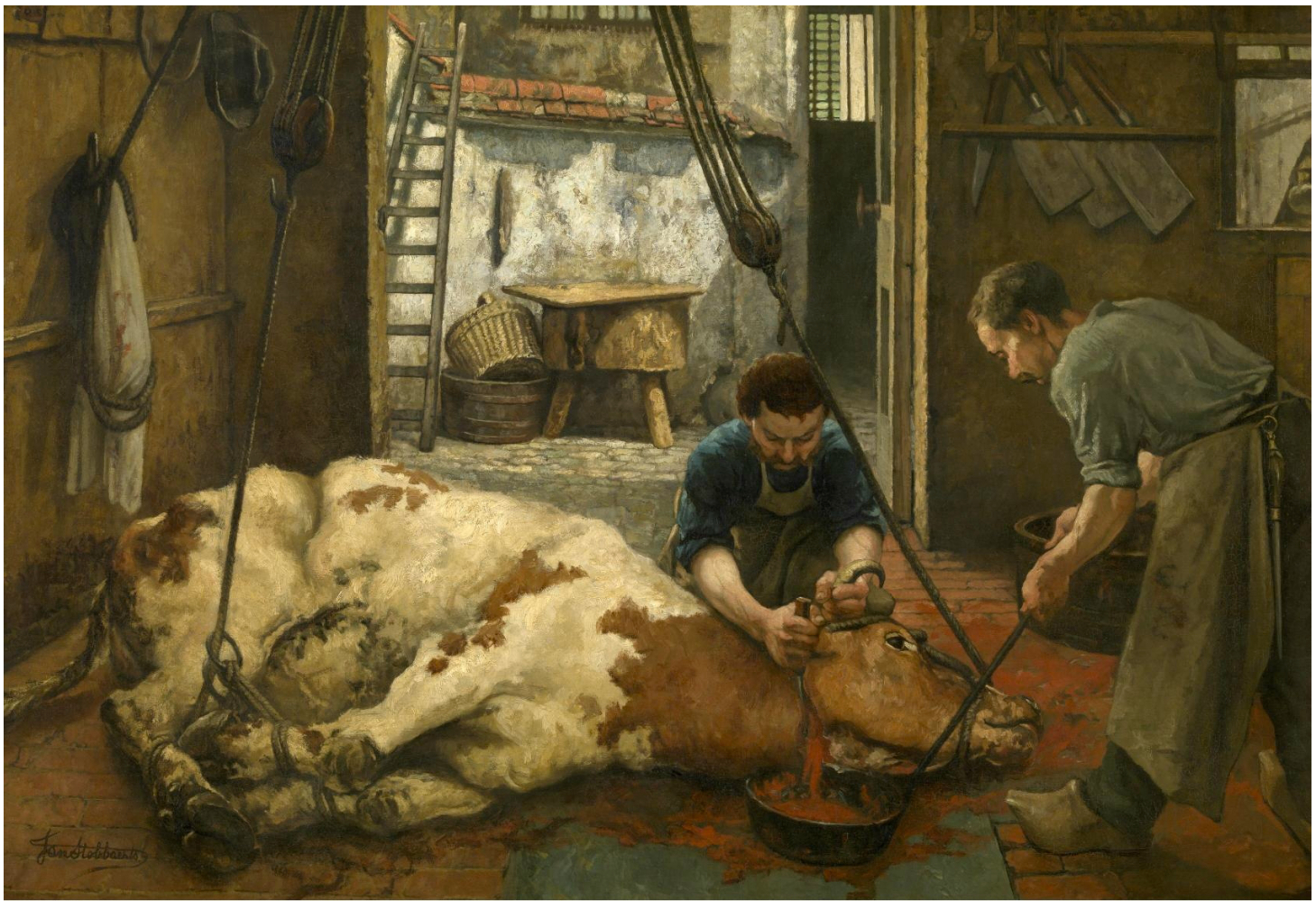
Slaughtering (c. 1873)

Stobbaerts received various officials awards including the award by the French state of the Légion d'Honneur in 1900 and by the Belgian state of a knighthood in the Order of Leopold in 1911. He died in Schaerbeek on 25 November 1914.

Jan Stobbaert's grandson Marcel Stobbaerts (1899–1979) was a successful artist.

== Work ==
Stobbaerts painted pictures of artisans, landscapes, animals and still lifes. He occasionally painted portraits and at the end of his career he created a few history and symbolistic paintings.

His preferred subjects were low-life paintings of farm yards and barns. He was one of the first artists to start open-air painting in Belgium and he was one of the pioneers of Realism. The naturalistic realism of his composition Slaughtering caused a stir when it was displayed at the Antwerp Salon of 1872. The painting shows a butcher cutting the throat of a cow in the front of the scene and the blood flowing out into a container. Stobbaerts demonstrated in this work his rejection of the idealistic subjects, which were common among the academic artists working in Belgium at the time, and that the depiction of a craft was a sufficient ground to select it as a subject for a painting. The Slaughtering was followed by many depictions of livestock farming including cattle and horses.

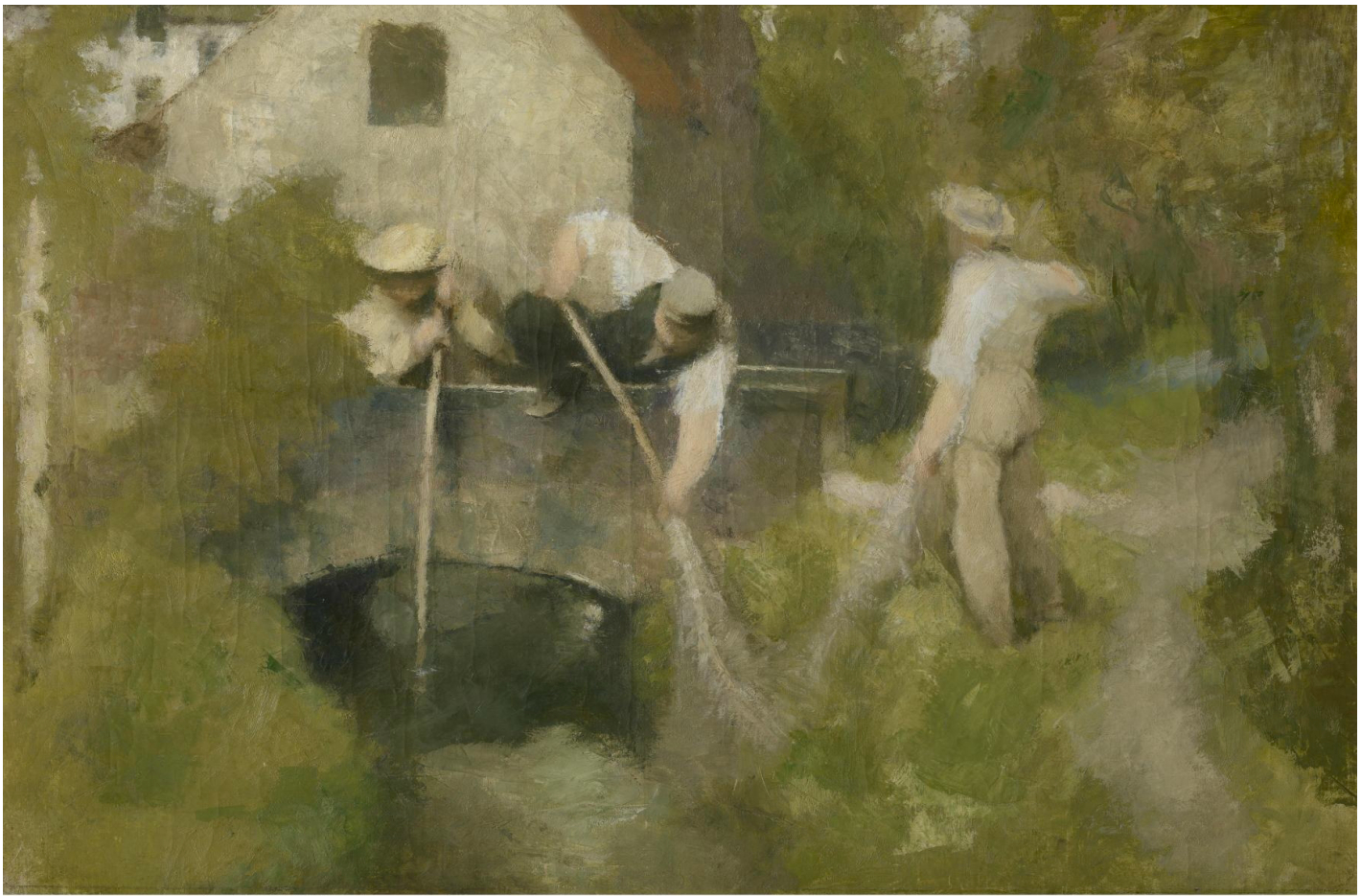
Dredging in the Woluwe (1896)

While in his early works he painted scenes with pets in kitchen interiors in which the genre and anecdotal elements prevailed, from 1880 onwards stables and barns became a dominant theme in his work. The compositions in this period were painted with an almost photographic realism. His sober monochrome palette developed to a more balanced color scheme and he gave more attention to the effect of light.

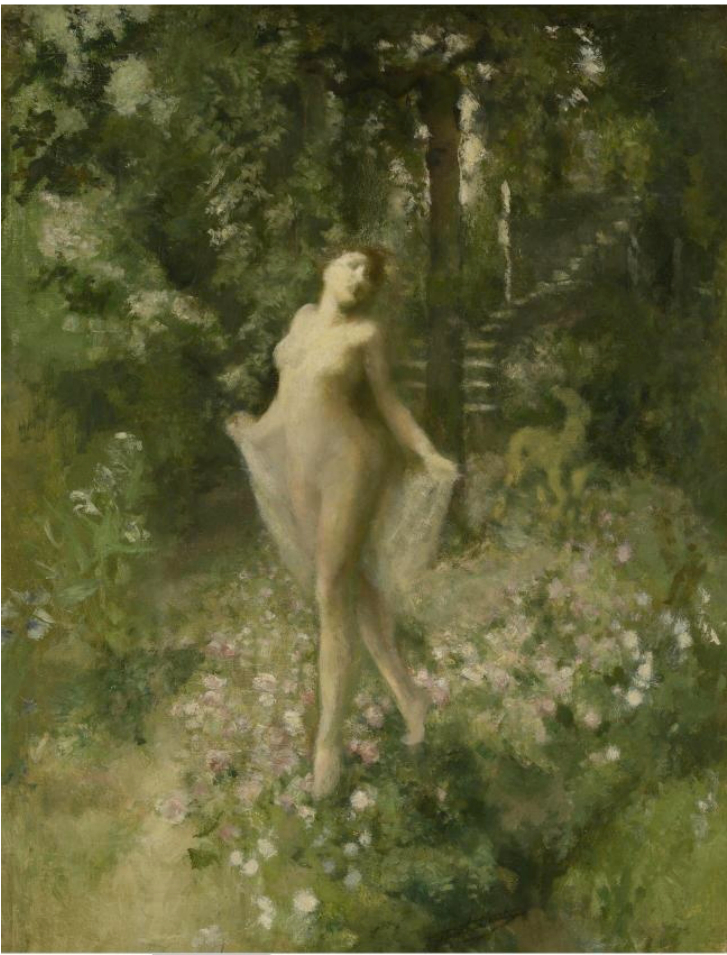
Bath of roses

Around 1890, Stobbaerts' style underwent a considerable change likely under the influence of his discovery of Impressionism and his personal search for resolving the problem of light. Stobbaerts abandoned the detailed realism in favour of a very personal sfumato of light. His style became velvety, his brushwork looser and the paint more fluid. His paintings of the 1890s depicting scenes around the river Woluwe were made with an opaque, somewhat transparent paste. The artist concentrated on the effect of light and the forms, while they remained recognizable, became less clear as if seen through a soft-focus lens. The subject matter itself became less important.

In his later works he abandoned his realistic themes and started to paint scenes inspired by Symbolism. An example is the Bath of roses, which shows a nymph-like woman who submerges in a bath of roses and remains unreal and impossible to grasp.

Stobbaerts is the author of several etchings, which deal with a similar subject matter as his paintings.
