= Gustave Vanaise =

Belgian painter

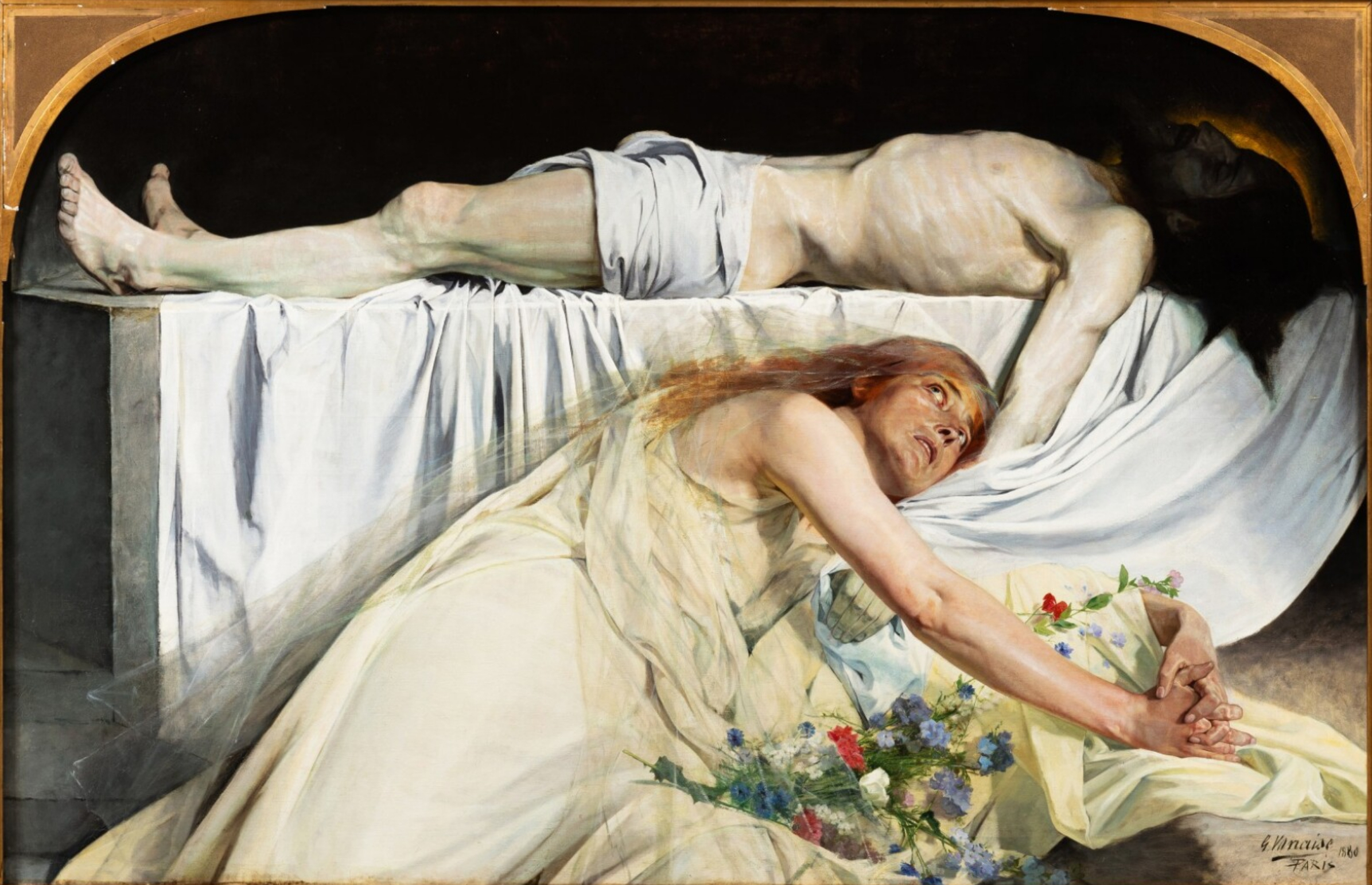
Magdalene at Christ's Tomb

Gustave Vanaise (birthname: Gustavus Antonius Maria Vanaise) (4 October 1854 in Ghent - 2 July 1902 in Saint-Gilles/Sint-Gillis) was a Belgian historical, portrait, genre, nude, landscape and still life painter. He set as his goal the revival of history painting in Belgium by creating large canvases depicting glorious scenes from national history. He also painted some Orientalist scenes. Despite his commercial success, his academic and realistic style had started to fall out of favor during his lifetime even as his later works became brighter in color and looser in touch under the influence of contemporary art trends.

== Life ==
Vanaise was the son of Nicolaus Josephus (1821–1876), a pastry chef originally from Marche-lez-Écaussinnes, and Seraphina Antonia Vlieghe (1822–1860). He was the fourth of six children. The artist suffered from a physical deformity, which had stunted his growth, and struggled with poor health throughout his life. While attending elementary school, he assisted his father who wished to train him in the pastry business. When he was 13 years old, his father agreed to abandon his succession plan for his son and let Gustave attend the drawing classes at the Academy of Fine Arts in Ghent, whose director was Théodore-Joseph Canneel. He learned to draw after Antique statues under the strict guidance of Canneel. He attended the academy's painting classes from 12 May 1872. After his father died in 1876, his brothers provided him with the financial means to continue his studies. On 4 March 1877, he exhibited for the first time in his hometown and sold his first painting, a landscape. The buyer was the painter Auguste Dael who would become his patron.

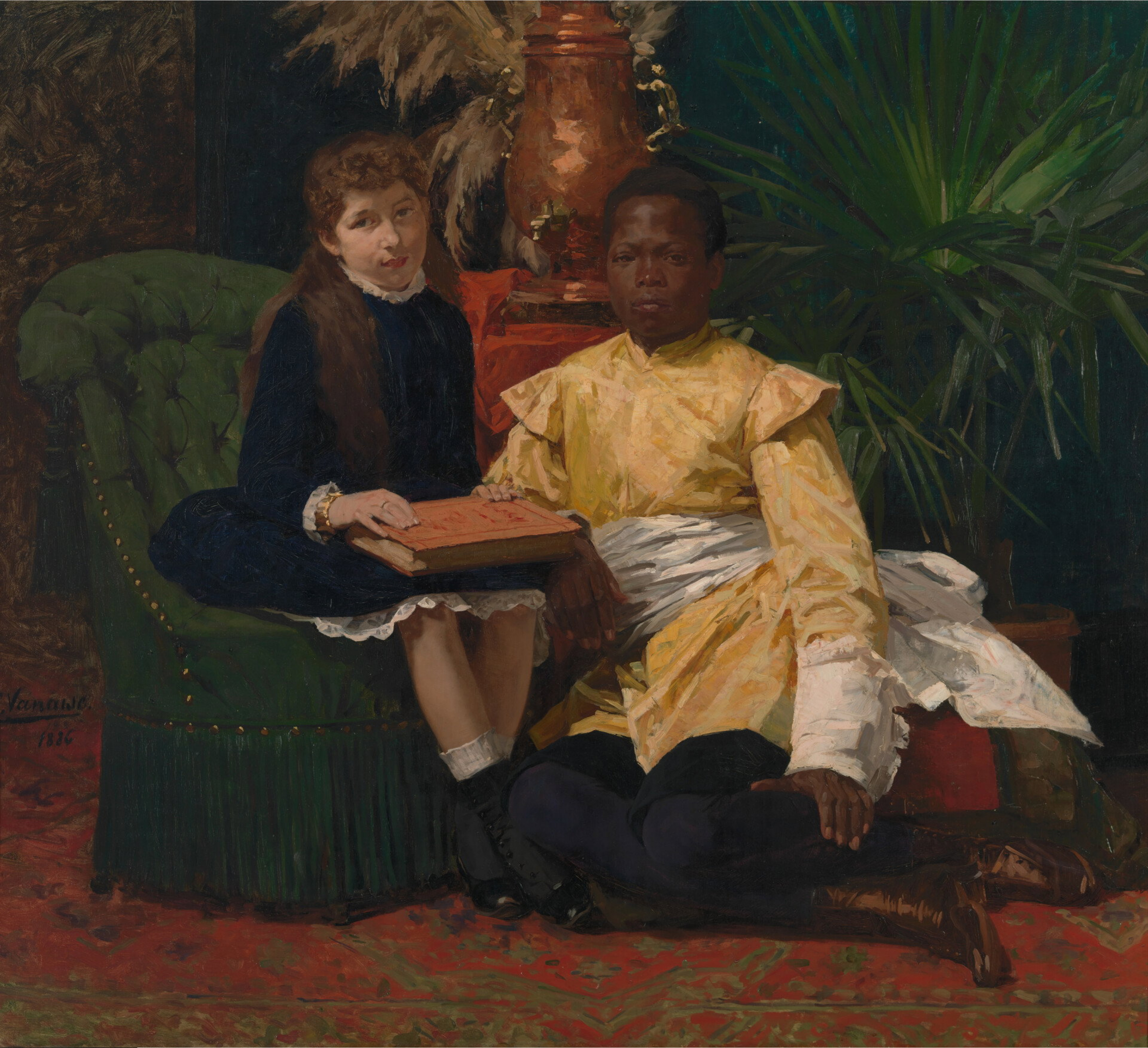
Sakala and Jeanne De Raedt

In March 1877, he traveled to Paris with Jules Van Syngel. He worked tirelessly at the Louvre and in Cluny. In October of that same year, he returned to Ghent with a great number of studies. He rented a studio in the premises of the Vrouwenbroeders (Carmelites) where he painted studies and portraits. The portraits of Mr. M. Em. Van Swieten and Van Hyfte date from this period.

He had a great interest in the Dutch masters with which he had become familiar in the Louvre. In early 1878, accompanied by the Dutch artist Louis Ludwig, he traveled to the Netherlands where he painted sketches after works by Frans Hals and others. In August 1878, he went for a second time to Paris, where he stayed for more than two years. He initially shared a studio with the Belgian painter Jan Van Beers, who at the time was trying to make a name as a history painter but later became the painter of the Parisian demi-monde.

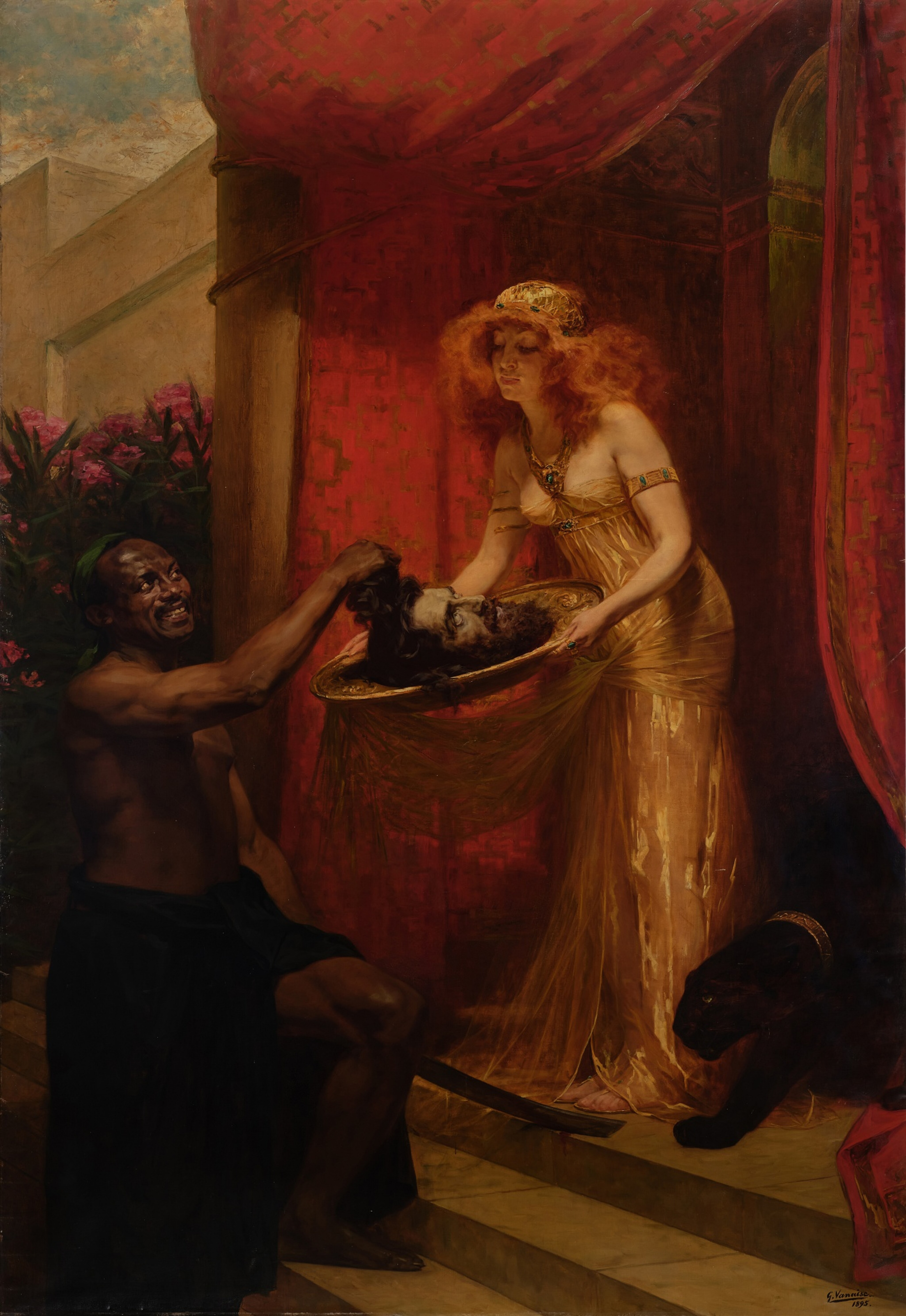
Salome

Later, he shared a studio with Jef Lambeaux. In Paris, he painted large canvases in the tradition of Belgian historical painting which focused on important events and persons in the national history: Louis XI and Olivier le Daim (which was placed on the ramp at the 1879 Paris Art Exhibition, later destroyed during the German bombardment of Louvain in 1914) and Quentin Massys as a Child drawing a portrait of his Mother. These works show the influence of Jules Bastien-Lepage, the founder of the French naturalist school, and Jan Van Beers and are painted in light tones with soft brushstrokes.

In October 1880, he returned to Belgium and set up a studio with Jef Lambeaux in Saint-Gilles/Sint-Gillis. He painted for the 1881 Brussels Salon the Lady with a Parrot, a composition executed in raw, brutal colors. He often returned to Ghent, where he worked in the spacious studio that his patron Auguste Dael, had built. It was there that he created the large-scale painting Saint Livinus in Flanders, a work that, after receiving an honorable mention in Paris and a gold medal in Ghent (1883), was acquired for the city's museum. In honor of his patron, Gustave Vanaise depicted Auguste Dael as Saint Livinus.

View of the Lagoon in Venice. Museum of Fine Arts Ghent. c. 1883

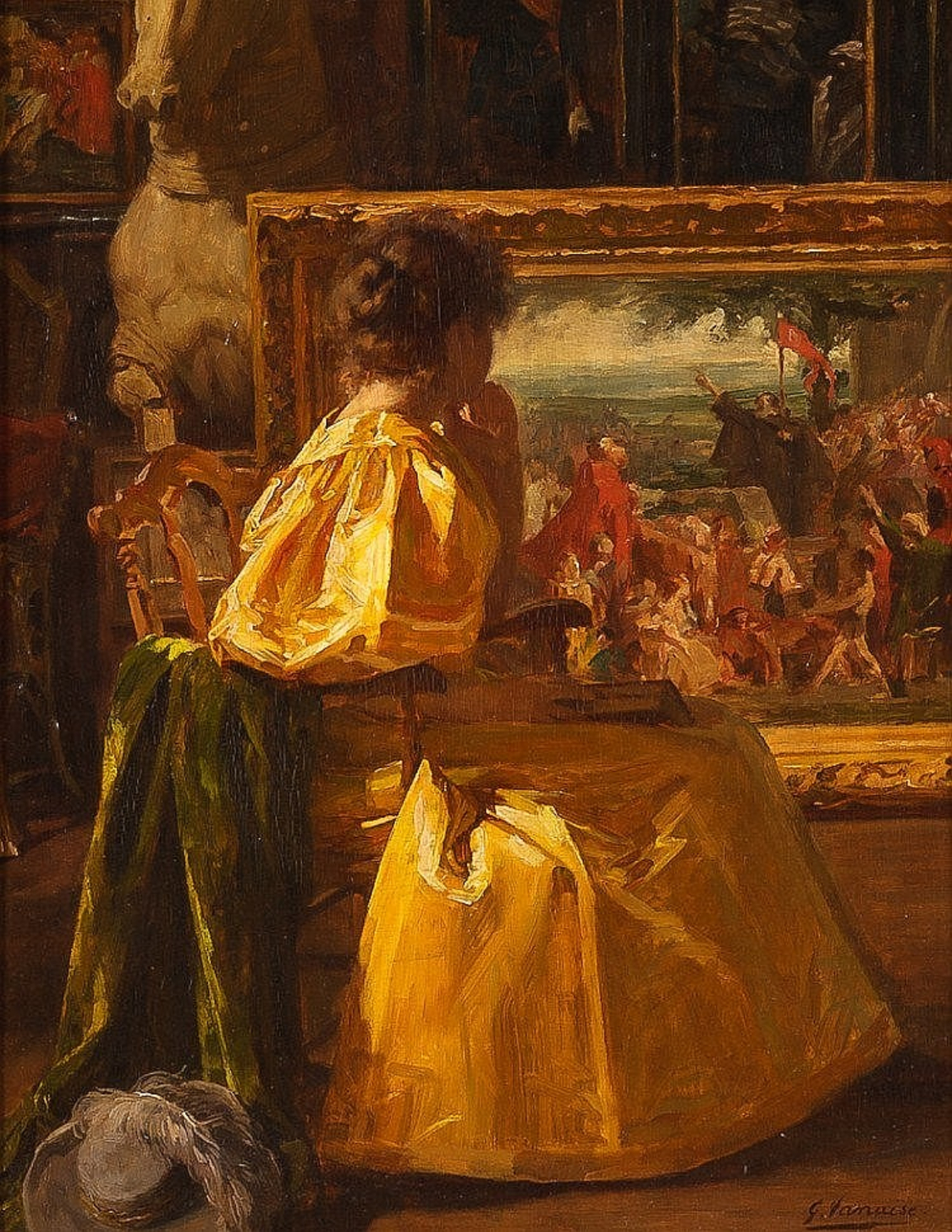
Visit to the Studio

The year 1882 was marked by a trip to Italy, which he undertook together with Jef Lambeaux and Rodolphe Wytsman. In Rome, he made copies of numerous works of art, including frescoes by Raphael and works by Velazquez. They also travelled to Venice. Rome, and Venice in particular, inspired him to create many works, mainly executed au plein air. Mid-January 1883 Lambeaux hurried back to Belgium after learning of his father's death. Vanaise and Wytsman remained in Venice to paint the scenery. Upon his return, he donated the painting The Lagoons of Venice to the Museum of Ghent. He returned to Brussels where he noticed that Lambeaux had taken over most of their studio. He then went back to his studio in Ghent provided by his benefactor Dael. Here he painted, one after another, Sunday Evening, The Good Samaritan, and the Equestrian Portrait of Mr. Dael. He became a prolific portrait painter, more out of need than conviction as he found himself in dire financial straits.

Vanaise returned to Brussels where he purchased a plot of land on Rue Moris. He had a home and studio built after a design by architect Georges Hobé, which he occupied in August 1885. He joined the artists' group La Chrysalide, which organized its own exhibitions. On 28 October 1883, Vanaise was a founding member of the Brussels-based Les XX, an association of avant-garde artists who sought to free themselves from the monopoly of the Salon system with its juries and prizes. The group organized annual exhibitions of its members' works, which also featured pieces by foreign avant-garde artists. He participated in the Les XX exhibitions for three consecutive years. As an academic painter of historical scenes who participated in the traditional salons, Vanaise, along with other academic artists in the Les XX group, became the target of attacks by avant-garde publications such as L'art moderne which led him to leave the group in 1886.

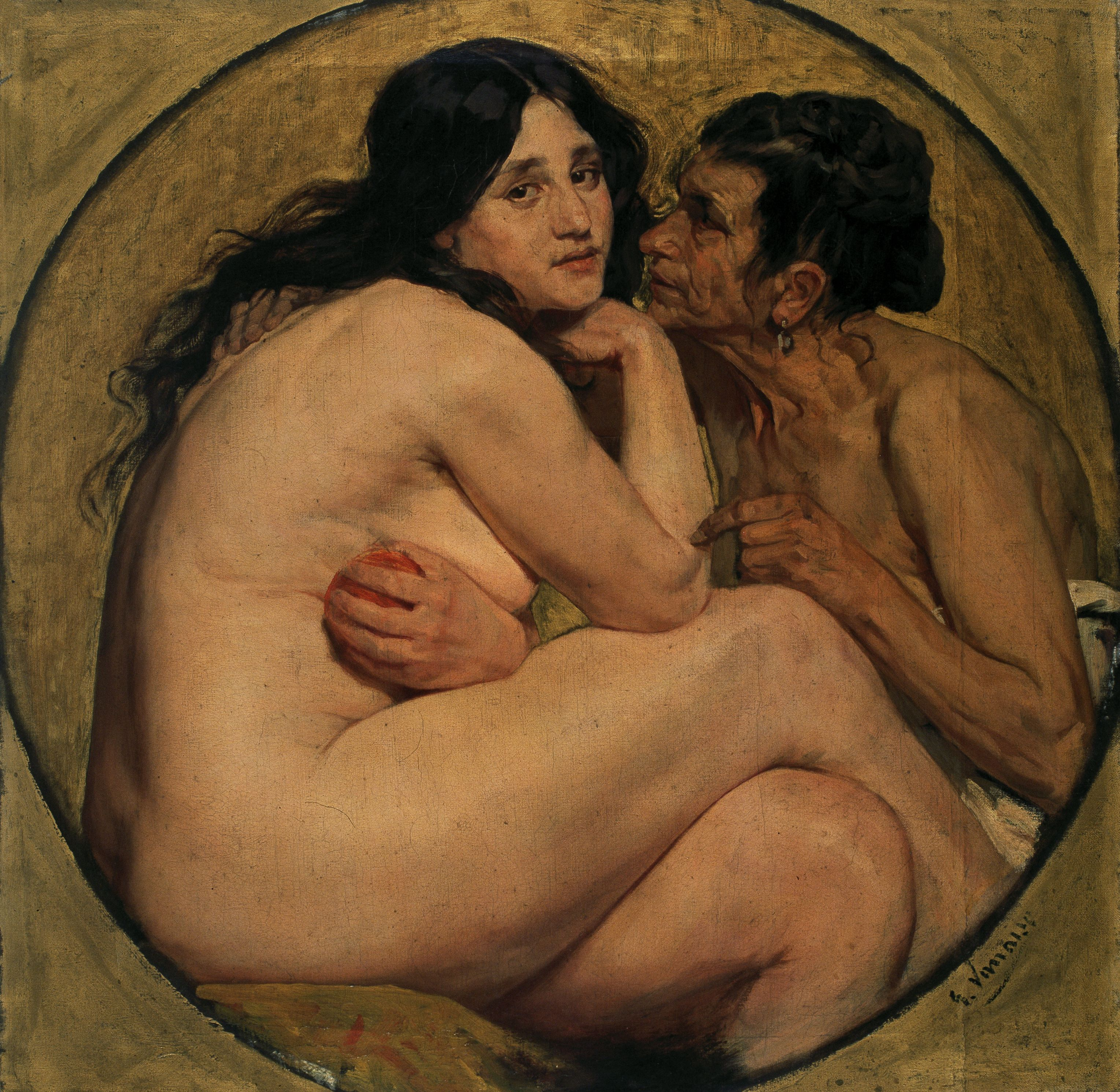
Eve (The Temptation)

In January 1887, he traveled to Spain, this time with Jules Lambeaux, the painter and brother of the sculptor. There he studied Velázquez and Ribera, as well as Jordaens and Rubens. The Alhambra in Granada captivated him for a time. He painted a picture of the interior of a church in Granada.

Back in Belgium, he settled temporarily in Bruges, where memories of the old bowmen's guilds inspired him and where he conceived the initial idea for his painting of the Legend of Saint Martin (now in the city hall of Kortrijk). In 1888, Vanaise was commissioned by Leopold Vander Kelen, mayor of the city of Leuven, to decorate a Gothic hall in the city. He depicted three themes in his wall decoration. Municipal authority is represented by a woman standing against the backdrop of Leuven City Hall. Behind her is a group of horsemen, among whom is the city's chief magistrate, proclaiming the granting of municipal privileges to the people. The other panels are titled: Military Glory and Art and Poetry.

He married Anna Maria (Mieke) De Coster (1868–1891) on 4 August 1890, in Oostduinkerke, West Flanders. He found domestic happiness and his wife appears in various paintings from just before and after his marriage. An example is the idyllic Happiness, which shows a half-biblical, half-contemporary-looking Holy Family, with his beloved wife Mieke at the centre, against a backdrop of a wide open landscape. Unfortunately, his wife died on 8 September 1891 from an illness, a loss from which he suffered greatly.

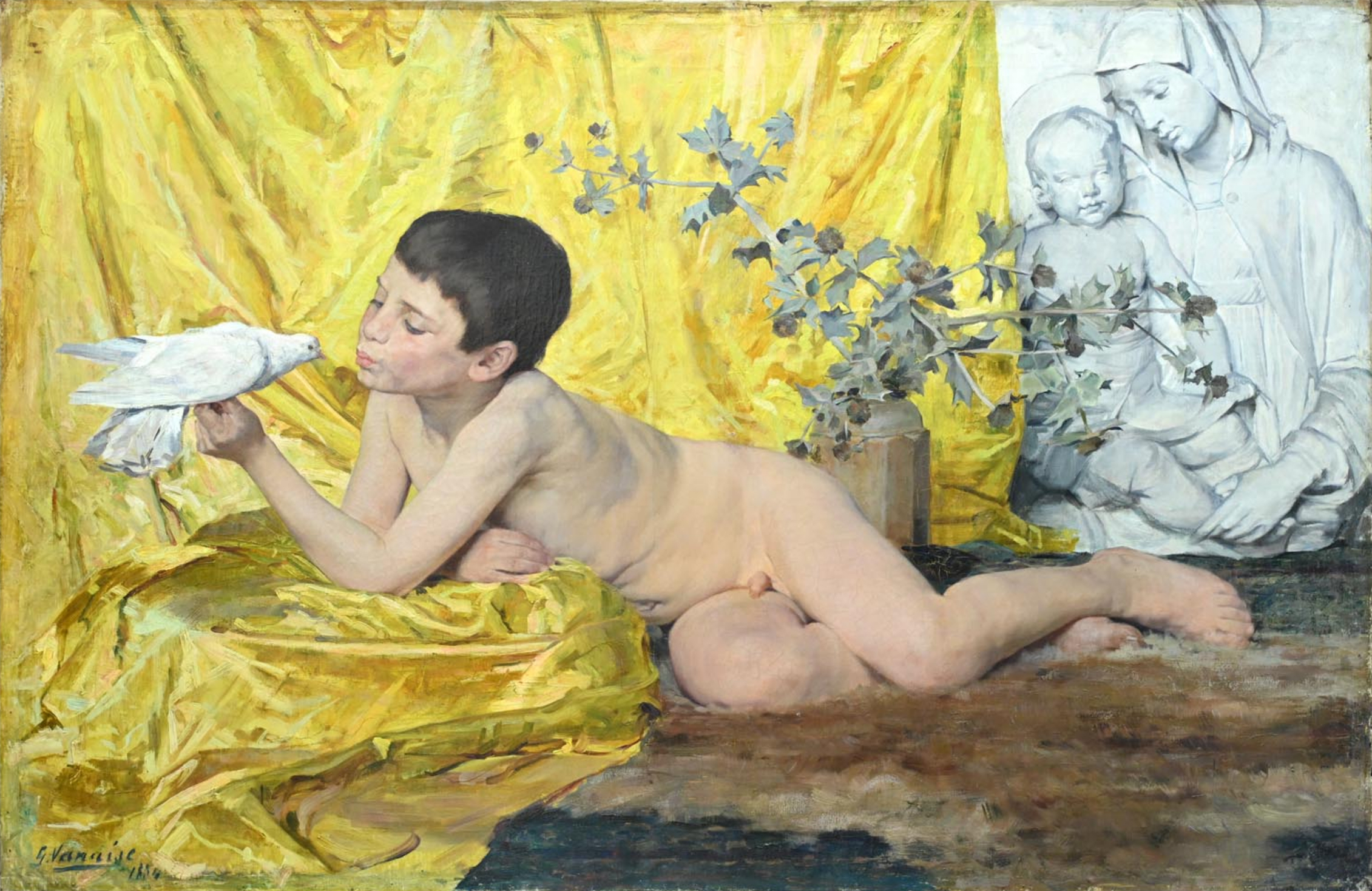
Boy with a Pigeon

During this period, Belgian Prince Philip and his wife Princess Marie commissioned Vanaise to paint a portrait of their son Prince Baudouin, who had died on 23 January 1891. This posthumous portrait was much lauded and led to many more commissions from the higher aristocracy and bourgeoisie in Belgium. During this period he finished his large Jacob Van Artevelde – Celebrated, Murdered, and Glorified (1892, Museum of Fine Arts, Ghent, height: 498 cm, width: 854 cm), which took him five years to complete. It was exhibited at the Ghent Salon of 1892, where it received mixed reviews.

He then shifted his focus to smaller scale works such as portraits, genre portraits and nudes. He still harbored the ambition to paint a large history painting. He decided to take Peter the Hermit preaching the Crusade as his subject. He completed the work on 18 April 1897. It was somewhat smaller than his Jacob van Artevelde but still measured 4.61 m in height by 6.74 m in width. The work was for the first time exhibited two years later at the triennial exhibition in the Casino of Ghent in 1899. While the work received positive criticism from some quarters, it was met with indifference by the supporters of the Impressionist school championed by Emile Claus, which dominated the Belgian art scene at the time. Vanaise did not show the painting for another two years. He gradually withdrew from public life and stopped participating in exhibitions years before his death.

He died at the age of 47.

== Works ==
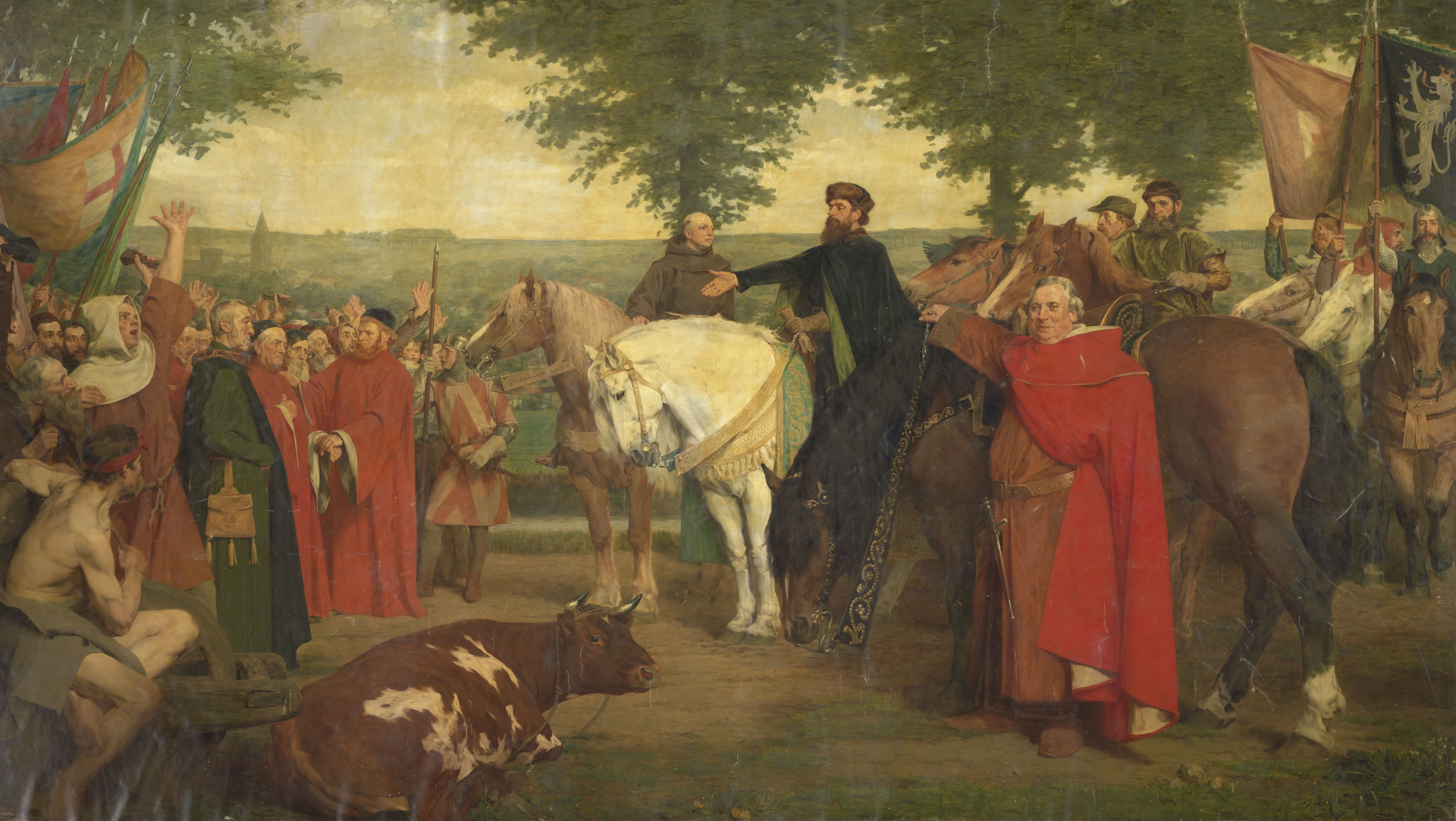
The Glorification of Jacob van Artevelde

Vanaise was a prolific painter whose subjects range from history, portraiture, genre painting, marine painting, landscape, Orientalism, nudes and allegories. He was trained in the academic and realist traditions and in the style of the Romantic School of Belgian painting which was established by Gustaaf Wappers in the 1830s. He was the creator of large-scale works in the tradition of the Belgian school of history painting. Examples include Willem Key painting the portrait of the Duke of Alva ordering the beheading of the Counts of Egmont and Hoorne and Jacob Van Artevelde – Celebrated, Murdered, and Glorified, which show his admiration for Flemish masters such as Rubens. He was known for his nudes which were very accurate in the drawing and natural in colour.

Under the influence of contemporary art movements, with which he came into contact as a member of Les XX his solid painting style became more fluid and his traditional color palette brighter.
