= André Hennebicq =

Belgian painter

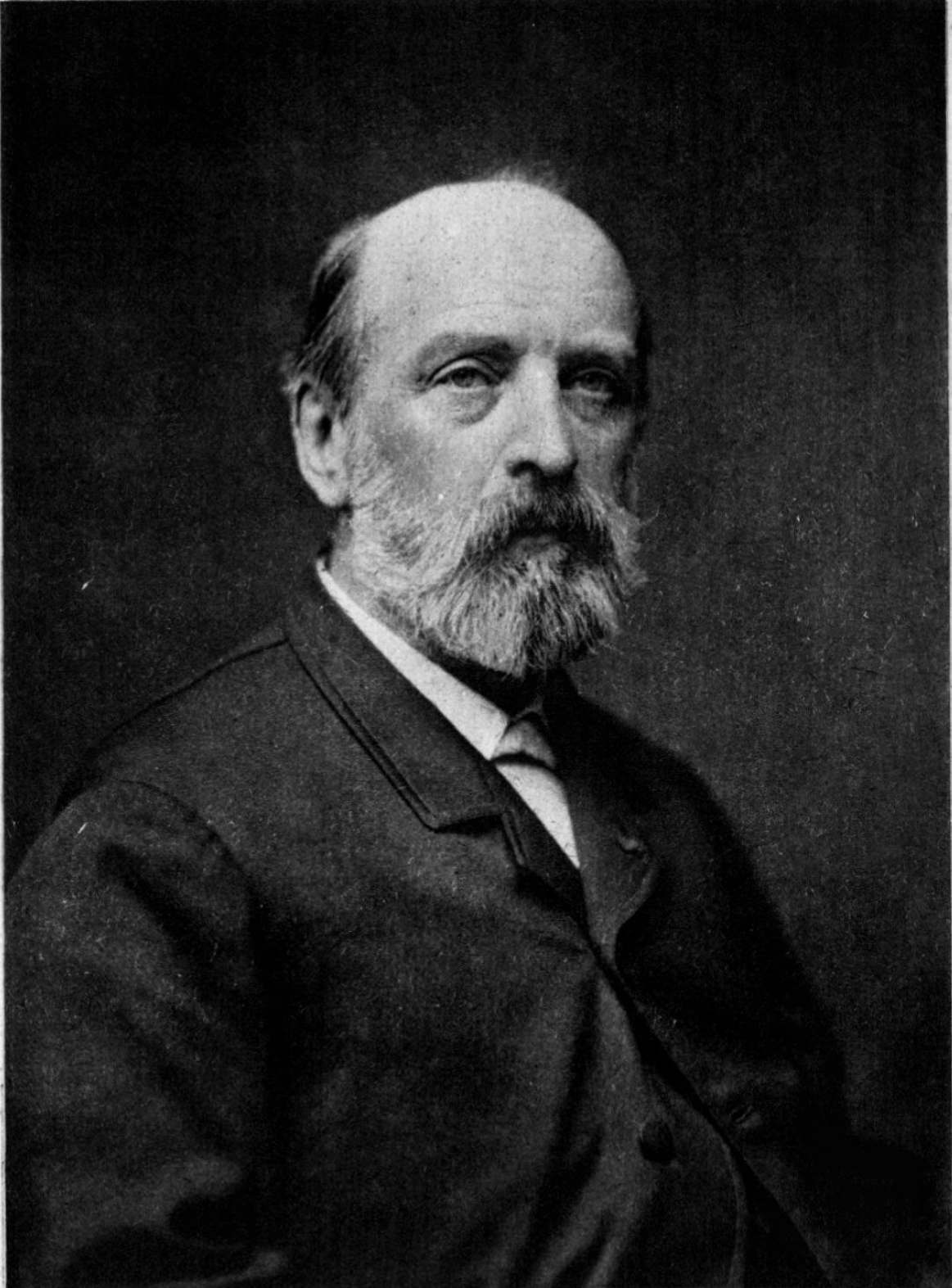
Photograph of Hennebicq (undated)

André Hennebicq (16 February 1836–31 March 1904) was a Belgian painter, specialising in historical pictures and murals. He trained under Joseph Stallaert in Tournai, his native town, and Jan Frans Portaels in the Académie Royale des Beaux-Arts in Brussels. He won the Prix de Rome (Belgium) in 1865; the gold medal at Brussels in 1872 (for Travailleurs dans la campagne romaine) and at Paris in 1874 (for Messaline, insultée par le peuple).
