= Jef Leempoels =

Belgian painter

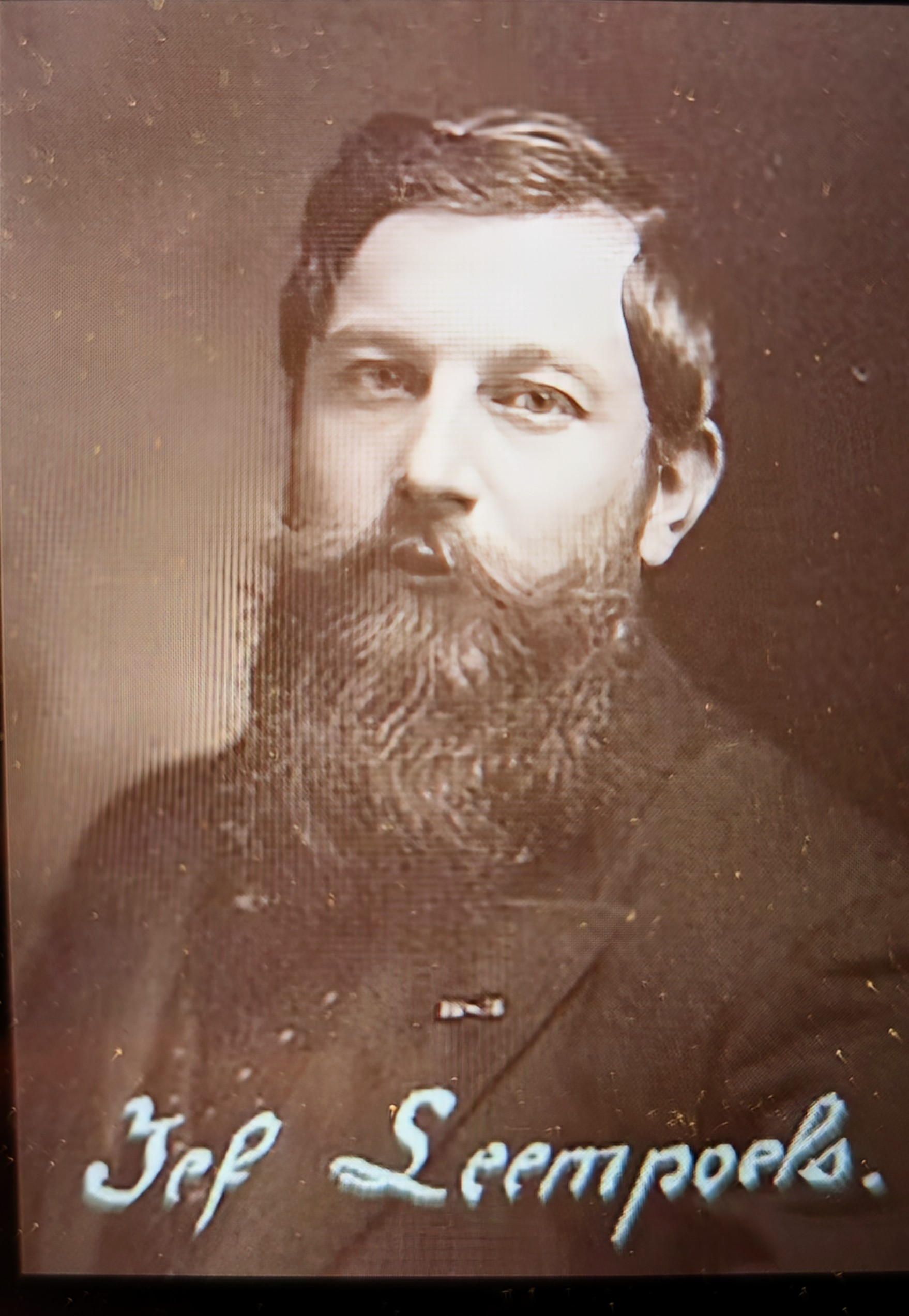
- Portrait of the Artist (1905)
- Born: Joseph-Louis-Marie Leempoels; 15 April 1867; Brussels, Belgium
- Died: 11 April 1935 (aged 67); Ixelles, Belgium
- Resting place: Ixelles cemetery - Grave 4999 in row O1
- Education: Académie Royale des Beaux-Arts of Brussels
- Occupation: Painter
- Spouse: Georgette-Jeanne-Louise Van Huële (1882 - 1965) - Married 1910

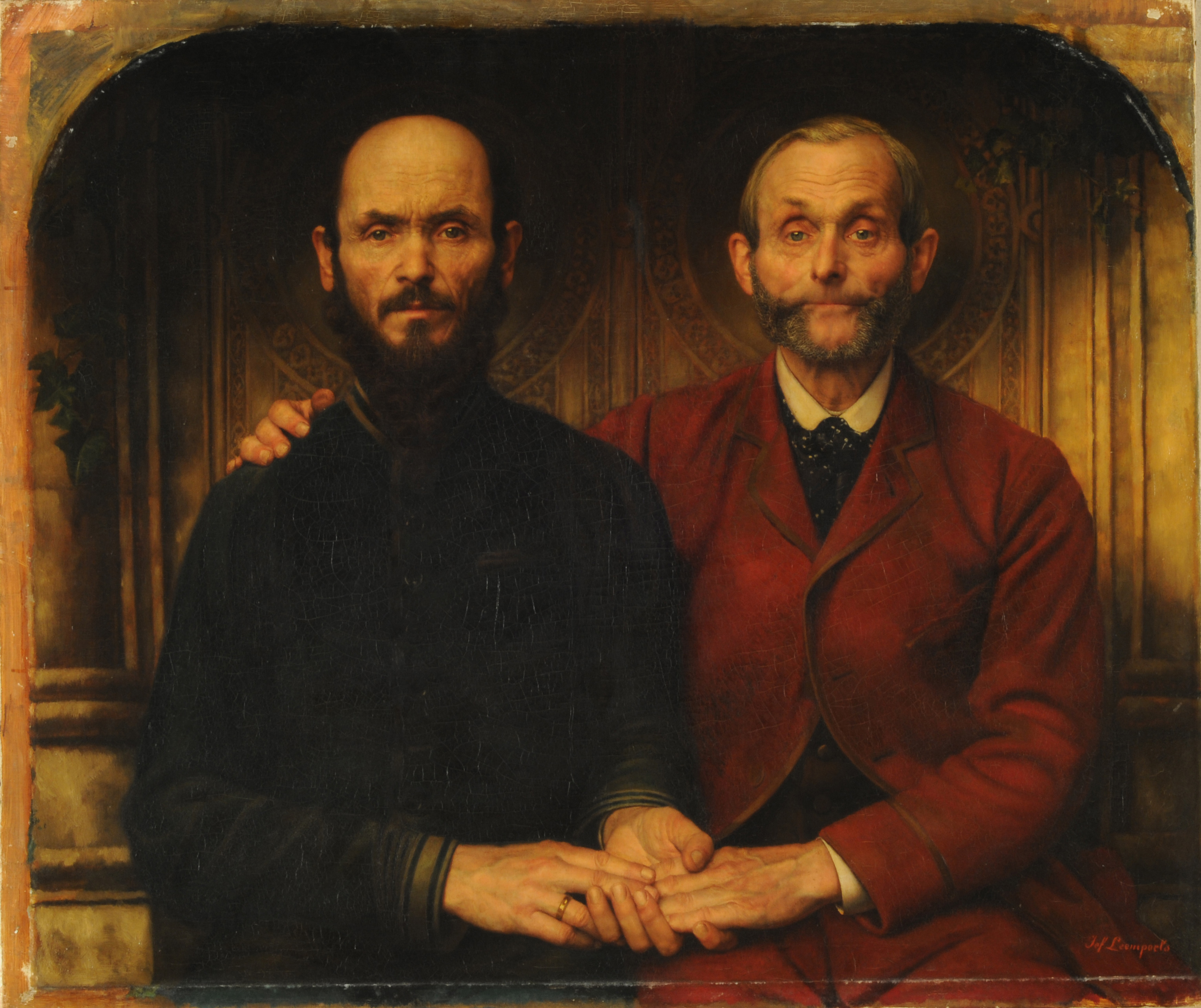
Friendship

Jef Leempoels or Joseph Leempoels (15 May 1867 in Brussels – 11 April 1935 in Ixelles) was a Belgian painter who was renowned in his lifetime for his society and official portraits as well as his genre scenes and symbolist compositions. He also worked in other genres such as still lifes and landscapes. His work ignored modernist developments and his style has variously been described as academic, realist and symbolist.

== Life ==
Jef Leempoels was born in Brussels. He started painting at the age of 19 when he commenced his studies at the Académie Royale des Beaux-Arts in Brussels. There he was a student of leading Belgian painters Jean-François Portaels and Joseph Stallaert, both rather academic history painters who were known for their Orientalist and Classicist paintings.

At a young age Leempoels was able to establish an international reputation and he won several international distinctions. In Paris he won an honorable mention at the 1893 salon and a silver medal at the Exposition Universelle of 1900.

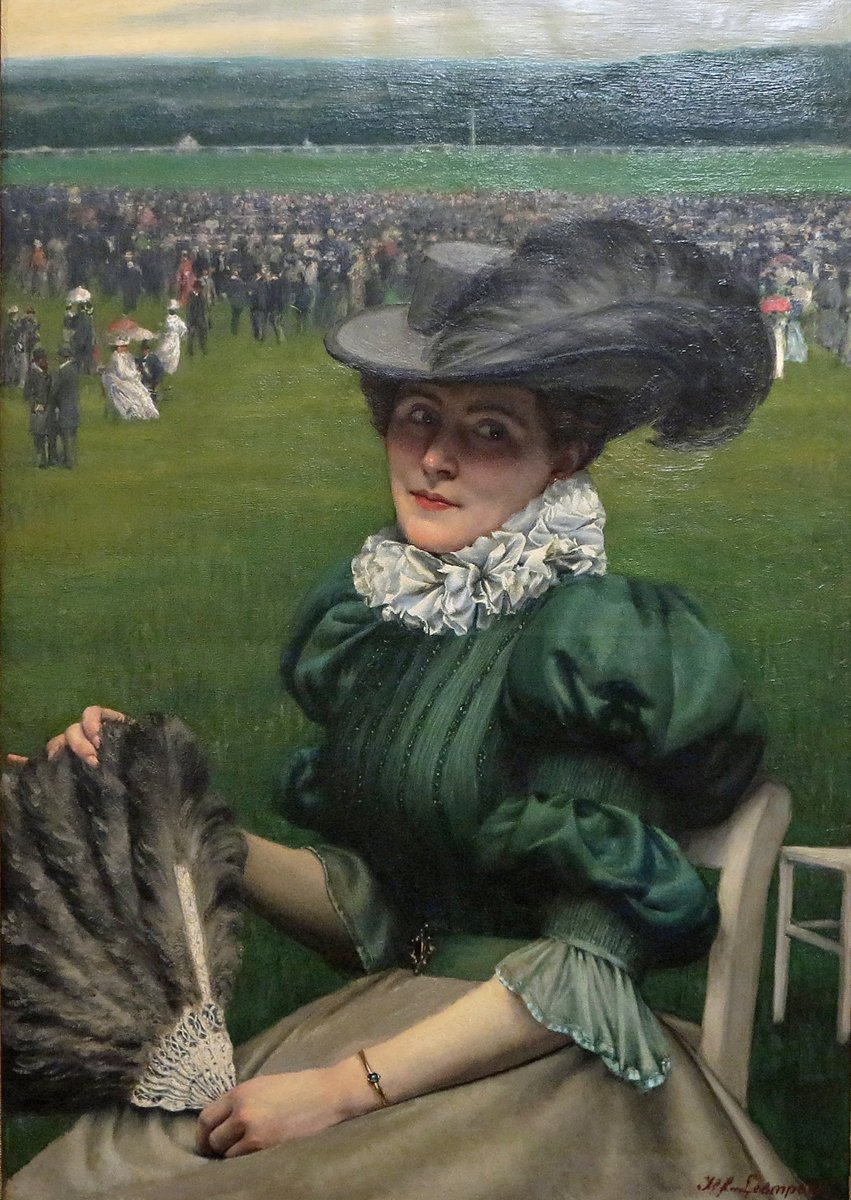
The lady with the fan

He won a gold medal at the Antwerp salon in 1894 and exhibited at the Féderation Nationale des Artistes of Belgium starting from 1897. He was awarded a gold medal at the Universal Exposition in St. Louis, the United States in 1904 for his painting Destiny and Humanity (private collection, château de Reynel, France). This painting, which is also referred to as The Hands, because of the many hands in the foreground travelled throughout the US and was exhibited at the Louisiana Purchase Exposition. It attracted a lot of attention and there was intense speculation in the media about how the painting should be interpreted. The painting was also exhibited in Munich, Brussels, Vienna and Paris.

Leempoels further won medals in Vienna and Buenos Aires (Grand Prix at the 'Exposicion del Centenario' in 1910).

The artist was also honoured by the Belgian government which made him a Knight in the Order of Leopold and the French government which made him a Knight of the Légion d’Honneur in 1910. in recognition of his abilities and his successful canvases at recent salons

Leempoels was patronized by members of the aristocracy and high society in Belgium, France, the United States, Argentina and other countries because of his highly prized society portraits. The Belgian monarchy and government also became patrons of the artist. Leempoels painted portraits of the Belgian kings Leopold II and Albert I. The Belgian prime minister Frans Schollaert asked him to draw a death-bed portrait of King Leopold II for the Belgian government’s archives. He also painted portraits of Franz Joseph I of Austria, Victor Emmanuel III of Italy and other monarchs as well as of prominent members of society.

Leempoels was a member of the Société des Beaux-Arts de Paris and a correspondent of the Academy of Fine Arts of Milan.

To service his international clientele and paint his society portraits on site, Jef Leempoels maintained at various times throughout his career studios in Ixelles (Brussels), Paris, New York and Buenos Aires.

While traveling both in the US and Argentina, where he had studios, Jef Leempoels never missed an occasion to promote local artists. While staying in the US, he was so impressed by the excellent work done by American artists that he has written an enthusiastic letter to this effect to his government, at the same time requesting the Belgian Minister of Fine Arts to tender an invitation to American artists for the coming Triennial Exhibition that would take place in Brussels in I907. Leempoels received endorsement by the Belgian Consul in the US.

== Work ==
Leempoels painted in many genres, including portraits, genre paintings, nudes, history paintings, landscapes, vedute and still lifes.

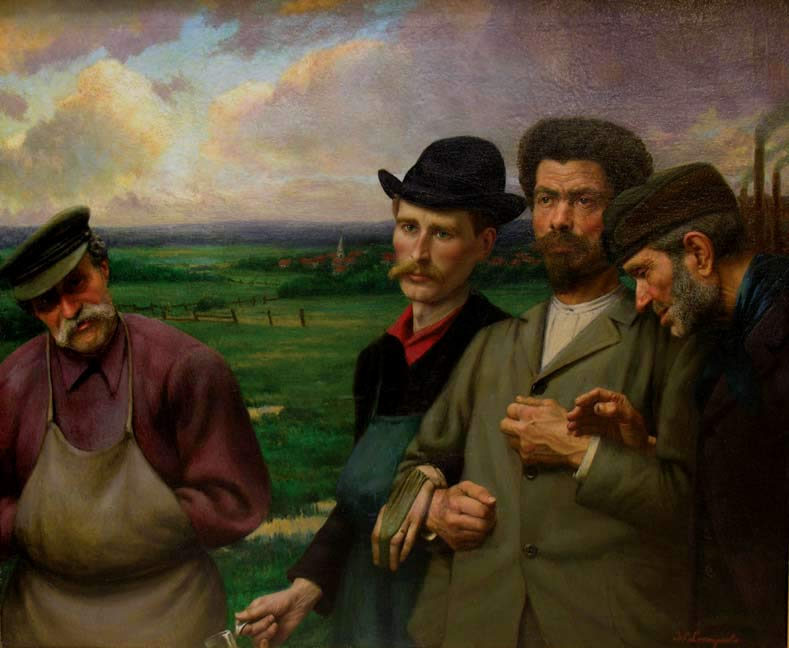
Workers returning from work

The works of Leempoels are academic in their execution. His style is realistic and sometimes even hyper-realistic. His painstaking attention to detail explains his limited output. An article about the artist dated 1905 reported that the artist claimed only to complete three to four paintings a year because of his precise technique.

While he painted many society portraits he also created scenes of social realism depicting persons from the upper as well as the working classes, which show an insight into his subjects. Leempoels had an idealistic view of the role of the artist and expressed the opinion that it is the artist’s mission to make the world better or wiser. Art should therefore possess more than beauty and also express an idea and have a philosophical meaning. This explains some of his paintings with titles such as 'Vision, cruel vision, why have you frightened me so often during the nights of my childhood? Why?' Paintings with such philosophical intent include the painting Destiny and Humanity referred to above as well as the composition entitled Friendship (c. 1896, National Museum of Fine Arts in Buenos Aires). The iconography of the painting is derived from José de Ribera’s painting of a married couple entitled The Bearded Woman (1631, preserved in the Hospital de Tavera). Leempoels not only copied the facial features but also the gestures of the woman and her husband. Leempoels updated the clothing of the two figures, reversed the couple's position and diluted the reference to the original inspiration by not showing a naked breast nursing the child. The quotation by Leempoels of Ribera's original composition was not noticed by the contemporary reception. The work is understood to constitute two male portraits. When the painting was exhibited in 1897 at the Salon of the Société Nationale des Beaux Arts, it was described by an art critic as two portraits in one canvas of two male friends of the same age, whose "physiognomy displays average intelligence" and who hold hands as a "sign of an indissoluble communion of feeling". Present-day views of the picture have emphasised the difficulty in interpreting representations of male bonding such as the one in Friendship.

The works of Leempoels, including some of his most famous paintings such as Destiny and Humanity, are mainly held in private collections. The current location of many of his works is unknown and some works are only known from contemporary black-and-white reproductions in magazines and exhibition catalogues. Only a few museum collections include examples of Leempoels' works. This may have contributed to his current relative obscurity.

In 1897, Destiny and Humanity was shown in the British periodical The Athenaeum, with a positive review from André Michel.

In France, the 1922 Larousse dictionary categorized Jef Leempoels as follows: Belgian painter, born in Brussels in 1867, composed iconic paintings in an archaic style

The following works are in museums, but not all are on public display: “Les Éplorés / Die Weinenden / The Weeping” (Belvedère, Vienna); “Amitié / Amistad / Friendship" (MNBA, Buenos Aires); "l’Ergoteur / El Ergotista / The Critter” (MNBA, Santiago de Chile); “Portrait of Miss Ana-Maria Heber-Garcia” (MNAD, Montevideo); Self-portrait "The painter and his wife" (Broodhuis, Brussels); "Portrait of Mayor Adolphe Max" (Broodhuis, Brussels).

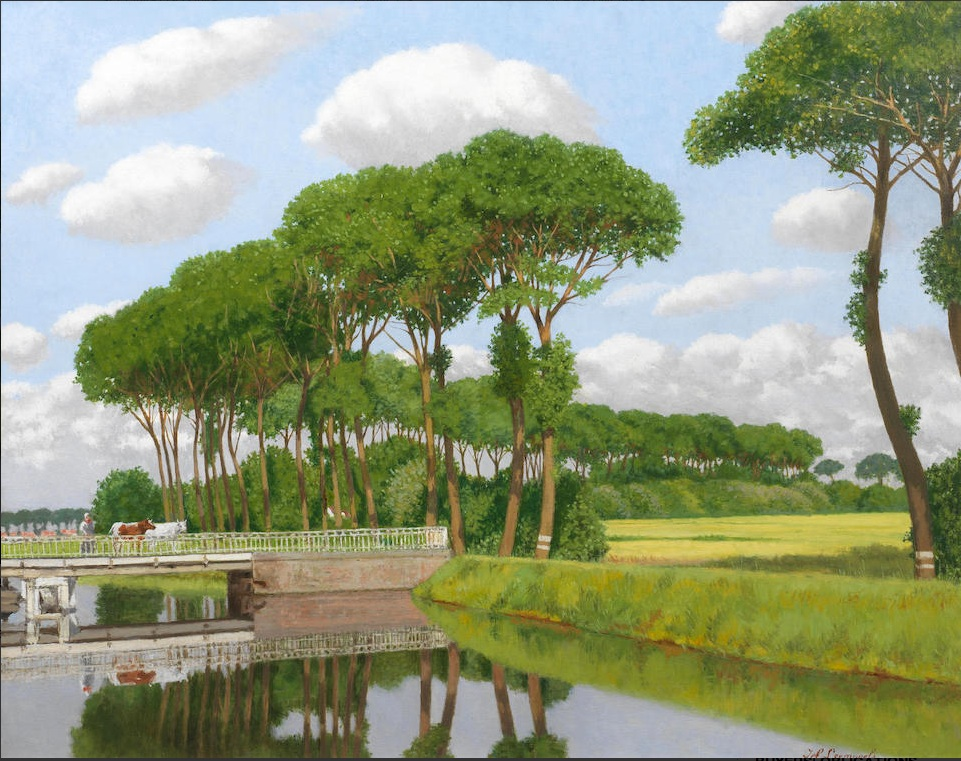
Canal in Flanders
