= Impens =

Impens is a surname. Notable people with the surname include:

- Clara Clairbert (born Clara Pierre Impens, 1899–1970), Belgian soprano
- Christophe Impens (born 1969), Belgian athlete
- Josse Impens (1840–1905), Belgian painter
- Ruben Impens (born 1971), Belgian cinematographer
