= Fernand Toussaint =

Belgian painter and illustrator

Fernand Toussaint (1873–1956) was a Belgian painter and illustrator in the 19th century Belgian School. He was born in Brussels in 1873 in a family of upper-middle class. When his parents discovered his talent in drawing they helped him to develop it in full.

At age 15 he began studying art with Jean-François Portaels at the Académie Royale des Beaux-Arts and three years later left for Paris to continue his studies there. He made his study under the well-known Belgian portraitist Alfred Stevens. He specialised in painting portraits of women, still lifes and city-scapes, in the Impressionist, Art Nouveau, and Post-Impressionist styles. His works include paintings, water-colours and posters. He is also a famed artist to depict beautiful floral still lifes and interiors, coastal views and seascapes. In this genre his paintings have to be compare with the painters of his epoque the likes of Constant Permeke and Adrien le Mayeur de Merprès, that influenced much his own manner. One of the Belgian art critics of that time Camille Lemonnier said about Toussaint, that he was "one of the painters that broadened the horizon of the peaceful and intimate landscape". Beginning from 1895 Toussaint had been receiving a lot of orders for commercial posters for different official events. He died in the Brussels suburb of Elsene.

== Honours ==
- 1901 : Awarded third class medallion of the French Artists Salon, Paris.
- 1919 : Knight of the Order of Leopold.

== Oeuvres ==
A selection of the art works of Fernand Toussaint is listed below.

=== Paintings and etches ===
- Tatiana, watercolour.
- La robe blanche (The white dress.
- Femme devant sa coiffeuse (Woman at her dressing table).
- L'Oiseau apprivoisé (The tame bird). Oil on panel, 1876. 59 x 44 cm.
- Vue de Nieuport (View of Nieuwpoort). Oil on canvas, no date. 32 x 40 cm.
- Printemps (Spring). Oil on canvas. Exposed at the Salon in Paris.

=== Posters ===
- Ville de Bruxelles - 3e Foire Commerciale. Lithograph on paper - Poster, 1922. 90 x 60 cm.
- Exposition Universelle Liege 1905. Lithograph on paper - Poster, 1905.

=== Postcards ===
- Le Soleil. Postcard published by Gala Peter chocolate.
- Le Lys. Postcard published by Gala Peter chocolate.
- La Rose. Postcard published by Gala Peter chocolate.
- La Chrysantème. Postcard published by Gala Peter chocolate.
