= Jean-François Portaels =

Belgian painter (1818–1895)

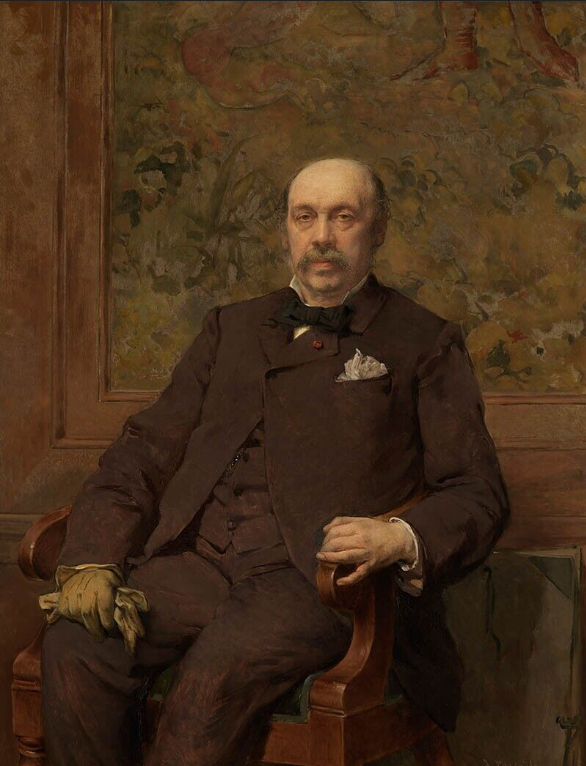
- Self-portrait
- Born: 3 April 1818, Vilvoorde, Belgium
- Died: 8 February 1895, Schaerbeek
- Education: Académie Royale des Beaux-Arts, Brussels
- Movement: Orientalist

Jean-François Portaels or Jan Portaels (3 April 1818 – 8 February 1895) was a Belgian painter of genre scenes, biblical stories, landscapes, portraits and Orientalist subjects. He was also a teacher and director of the Academy of Fine Arts of Ghent and the Académie Royale des Beaux-Arts in Brussels. He is regarded as the founder of the Belgian Orientalist school. During his time, he was praised as the premier painter of 'everyday elegance and feminine grace.' Through his art, teaching, and his leadership of the Académie Royale in Brussels, he exerted an important influence on the next generation of Belgian artists, including his pupil Théo van Rysselberghe.

== Life ==
Portaels was born in Vilvoorde, the son of a rich brewer who also was mayor of Vilvoorde. As he spent much of his youth drawing the scenes of his native town, his father sent him in 1836 to study at the Académie Royale des Beaux-Arts in Brussels. At the time the director was the painter François-Joseph Navez who had been a pupil of Jacques-Louis David. Portaels studied at the Academie under Navez with other brilliant students such as Charles de Groux and Joseph Stallaert. Navez also invited him to study in Navez's own studio, which enjoyed a great reputation at the time.

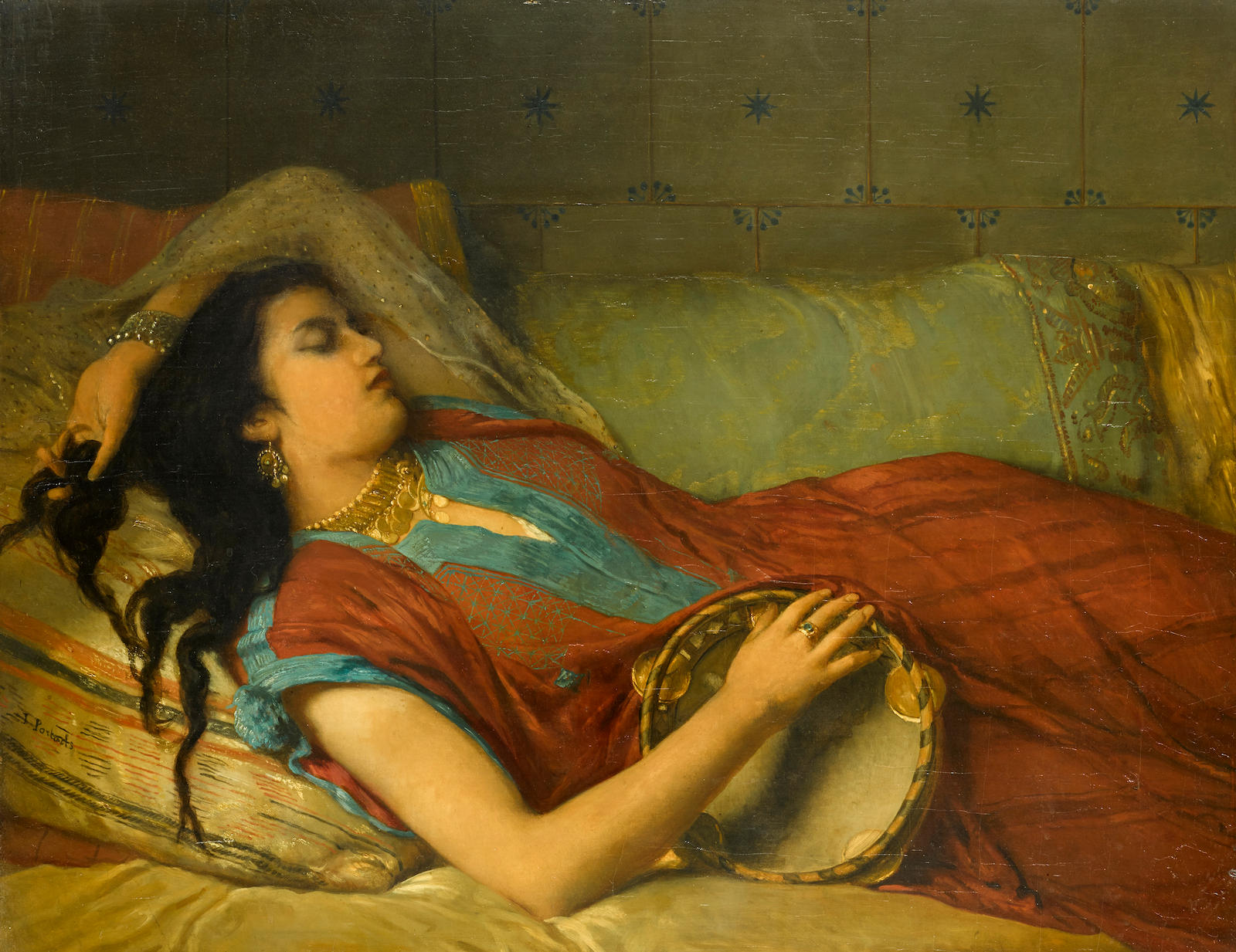
Resting tambourine player

Around 1841 Portaels went to Paris to continue his studies. He enrolled at the Ecole des Beaux-Arts. In his spare time, he studied the old masters in the Louvre and visited the Paris salons to seek inspiration from the new artistic trends in France. At the time, Orientalism was becoming into vogue. The Paris expositions, galleries, and salons showcased a recently-acquired taste for the Orient. The artistic course of Portaels's works were given a determining direction, by this development. In Paris he also became a pupil of Paul Delaroche, a prominent French painter of historical scenes. Upon his return to Belgium, he won in 1842 the Grand Prix de Rome (i.e. the first prize) at the Belgian Prix de Rome.

The financial reward connected to the prize allowed him to travel to Italy where he stayed in Venice, Florence, and Rome. He continued to feel the pull of the Orient and travelled successively to Morocco, Algeria, Egypt, Lebanon, Palestine, Spain, Hungary and Norway. In Hungary, he spent quite some time to study the typical traits of the Magyars and Romani people. During his travels he was able to paint portraits of some prominent personalities such as the Viceroy of Egypt.

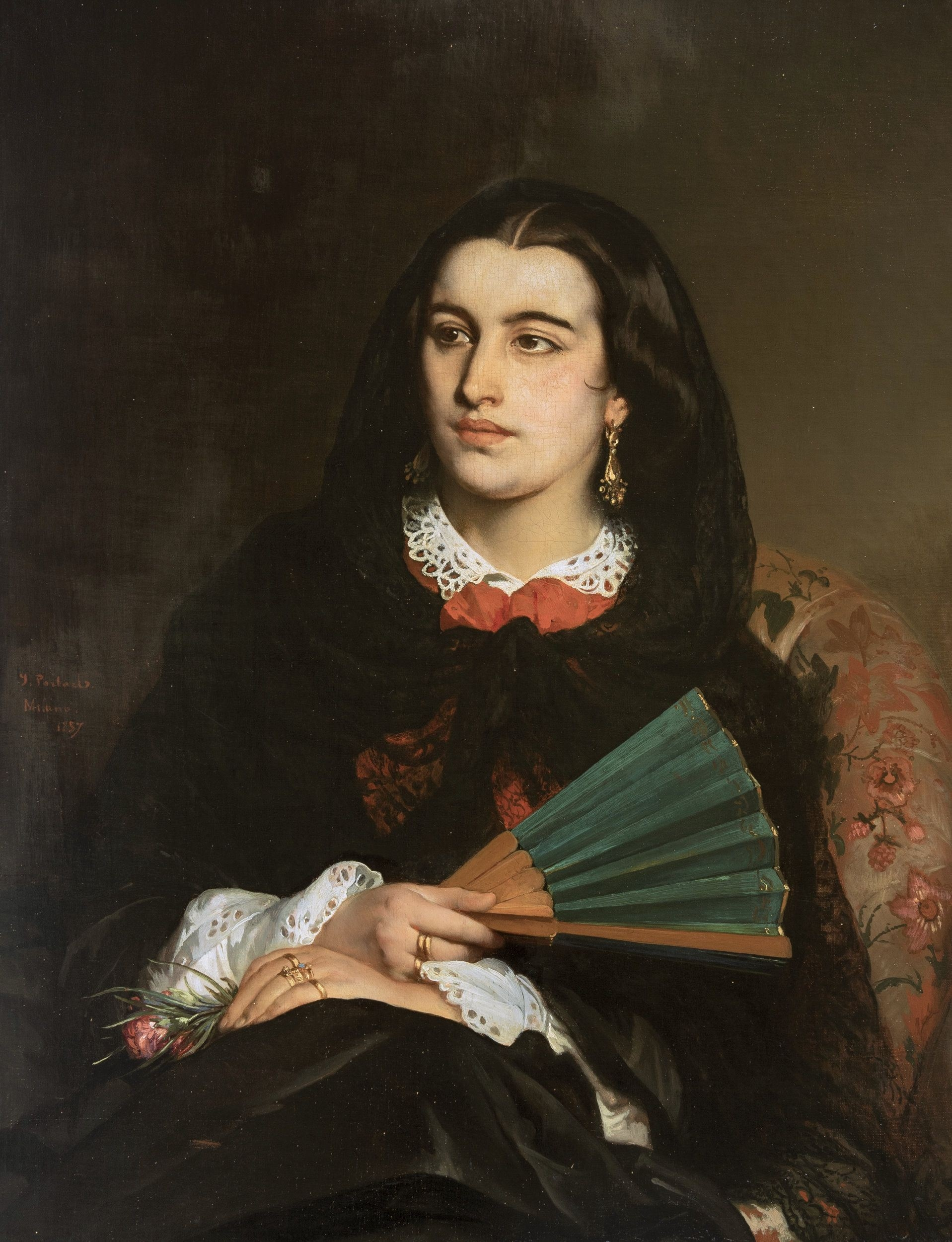
Milanese lady with a fan

On his return to Belgium in 1847 Portaels was appointed Director of the academy in Ghent to succeed Henri van der Haert who had died. He remained in this position for three years.

In 1849 he married Marie Hélène Navez, the daughter of his first teacher, Navez. The couple settled in Brussels in 1850. A son born in 1850 died soon after his birth. In 1851 he received the Grand Cordon in the Order of Leopold. When Navez resigned from the Brussels Academy, Portaels was asked to replace him. He declined, however, because he deemed the conditions offered to him not to be acceptable and he preferred to maintain his independence. Eugène Simonis was appointed director in his stead. Portaels was admitted as a member of the Royal Academy of Science, Letters and Fine Arts of Belgium in 1855.

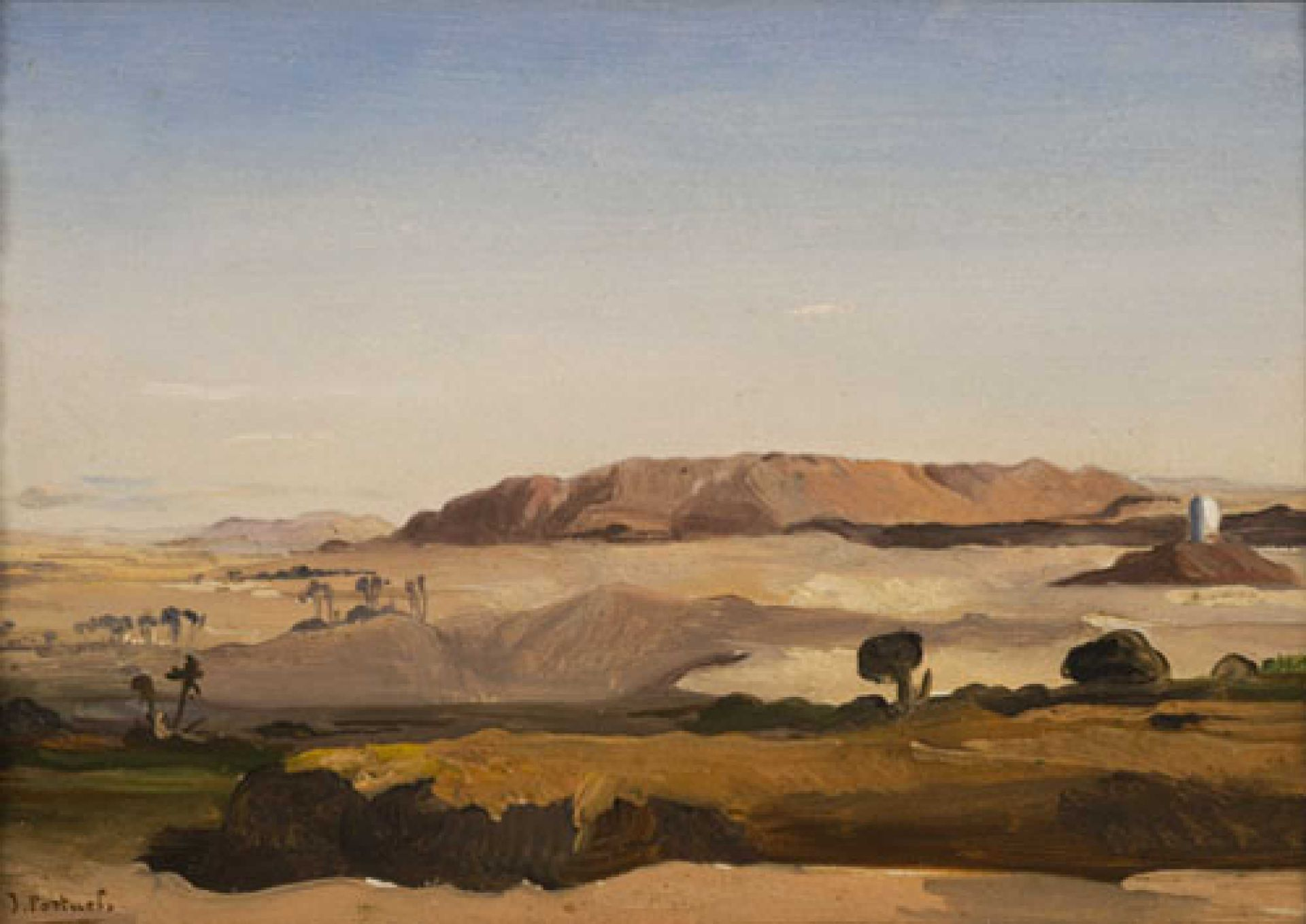
Landscape in Egypt

Following the death of his wife that same year, he moved in with his father-in-law Navez. From 1858 Portaels took over the private studio of Navez, in which he had studied himself. This studio which was referred to as 'atelier libre' (free studio) played an important role in the training of the next generation of Belgian painters. In 1863 Portaels reconnected with the Brussels Academy as he accepted to teach its drawing and painting course. After giving up this post in 1865, he dedicated even more time to the education of young artists in his studio.

Portaels was in demand as a portrait painter and also received many orders from the Belgian state and religious institutions, including the frescoes decorating the old Chapel of the Brothers of Christian Doctrine for which he used the innovative water glass technique. He was commissioned in 1850 to provide the decoration of the external pediment of St. James on Coudenberg, the church of the royal parish. This showed the high esteem in which he was held by the Belgian royal family. He became a familiar visitor of the Royal Palace since the time of the first king of Belgium Leopold I. In 1857, he attended the betrothal of Princess Charlotte. The following year, he was asked to paint portrait of the two princes and, in 1862, he served as a mentor to Prince Philippe, Count of Flanders. He also acted as an art advisor for the latter and assisted him with the selection of art works for the decoration of his palace in Brussels. After the accession to the Belgian throne of Leopold II in 1865 he served also artistic advisor to the king and was often admitted - like other Belgian artists such as the painter Ernest Slingeneyer and the sculptor Thomas Vinçotte - at the dinner table of the king. He taught art classes to Queen Marie-Henriette. His work was well represented in the royal collections. At the same time he portrayed many members of the bourgeoisie and the Belgian aristocracy.

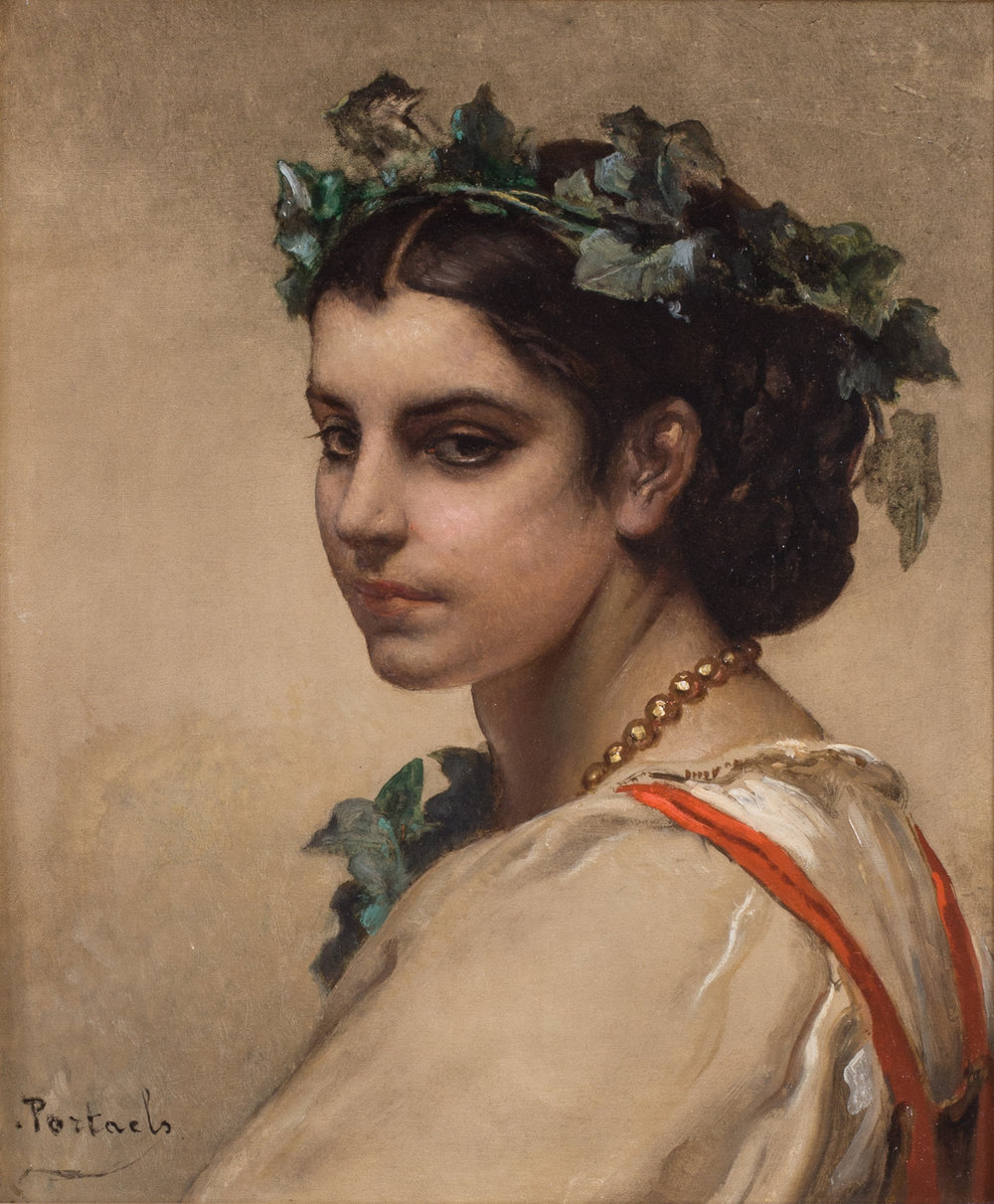
Maiden of the harvest

In 1870 he started to travel again spending most of his time in Algeria. He returned to Brussels in 1874. On 1 January 1878 he was appointed the director of the Académie Royale des Beaux-Arts as the successor of Simonis. which had so long been the object of his ambition. In 1881 he was made a Commander in the Order of Leopold.

He died in Schaerbeek.

== Work and influence ==
Portaels was a prolific artist who practised many genres: history painting, portraiture, Orientalist art, genre art and landscape painting. While his main focus was on Orientalist art and portraiture, he was in demand as a painter of biblical scenes and his works can still be found in many churches in Belgium such as in the Church of St. James on Coudenberg in Brussels and the Onze-Lieve-Vrouw van Goede Hoop Church in Vilvoorde. For the latter he painted a triptych on the story of the Visitation, i.e. the visit of Mary to Elizabeth. Stylistically he remained immune to the main artistic currents in European and Belgian art of his time: the Classicism of his master Navez and the Romanticism of his second master Delaroche. Instead, he created his own style which was characterised by its charm and elegant grace, which are at the basis of their success.

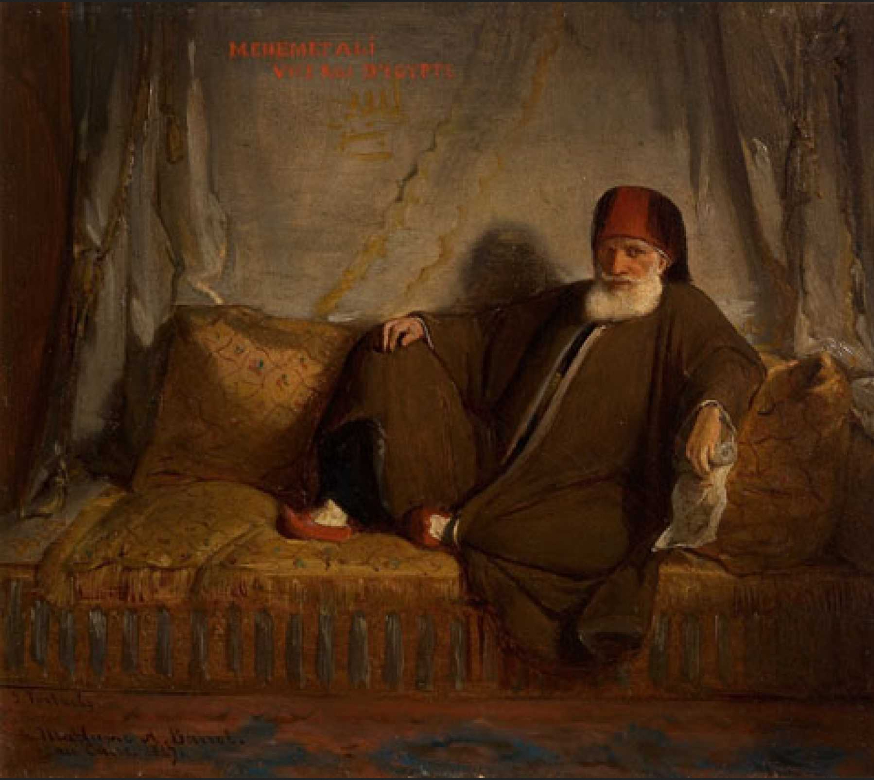
Portrait of Muhammad Ali, viceroy of Egypt

Portaels remained removed from the conventions of his time in the way he treated his subjects, as exemplified in his classic vision of the exotic theme of the Oriental woman. He returned numerous times to the aesthetic type of the 'Oriental woman,' whom he depicted with typically arched eyebrows and languid, almond-shaped eyes. These works are executed in a rather stiff manner. Only in his rare portraits of children did he attain more spontaneity such as in the Portrait of a Young Arabic Girl (Jean Moust Gallery). Portaels is seen as the principal painter who led the fashion for Orientalism in Belgium.

From the mid-1850s the Belgian government began to promote monumental art in Belgium. It provided financial assistance to artists on various projects. The promotion of monumental art dealing with episodes from the Belgian national history was regarded by the government of the young Belgian state as an important means of creating a national identity. The Belgian prime minister Charles Rogier was in particular in support of this movement. Portaels and Jean Baptiste van Eycken, also a pupil of François-Joseph Navez, helped launch the monumentalism movement in Belgium. They did this by introducing into Belgium new fresco techniques such as water glass painting, which they had studied abroad. Water glass painting is a technique of mural painting, intended to resist the effects of damp and pollution, that was invented and popular in the 19th century. It is a form of fresco painting. Portaels used the water glass technique at the old Chapel of the Brothers of Christian Doctrine (demolished in the 19th century). There, he and Victor Lagye created 20 historical scenes with this technique. Portaels also used this technique to decorate the tympanum of the Church of St. James on Coudenberg in Brussels with a scene showing the Blessed Virgin as a Comforter of the Needy. Portaels also decorated the drawing room of the Brussels home of his friend doctor Nollet with scenes from the history of medicine. He was assisted by Joseph Stallaert and Albert Roberti, also pupils of Navez. No further monumentalist works by Portaels are known. The monumentalist movement was subsequently taken up by artists such as Jan Swerts and Godfried Guffens who had come into contact with the movement in Germany.

Portaels eminent place in the history of contemporary Belgian art is due to his influence as a teacher of the next generation of Belgian artists such as Belgian painters Emile Wauters, Théo van Rysselberghe, Edouard Agneesens, Léon Frédéric, Jef Leempoels, Isidore Verheyden, Jean Delville, Xavier Mellery, Alfred Verhaeren, Antoine Van Hammée, Ernest Blanc-Garin, Jean Mayné, Josse Impens, Vanden Kerkhoven, Henri Vanderhecht, Eugène Joseph Adolphe Van Gelder, Fernand Toussaint, Albéric Coppieters, Louis Maeterlinck, Jacques de Lalaing, Jakob Smits, André Hennebicq, Camille Van Mulders, Anton Lacroix, Franz Meerts, Sophie Pir, Emile Charlet, Léon Houyoux, Dutch painters Jan Toorop and the Oyens brothers, the French painter Fernand Cormon, the sculptor Charles van der Stappen and the architects Ernest Van Humbeeck, and Charles Licot.

== Gallery ==
Works of Jean-François Portaels

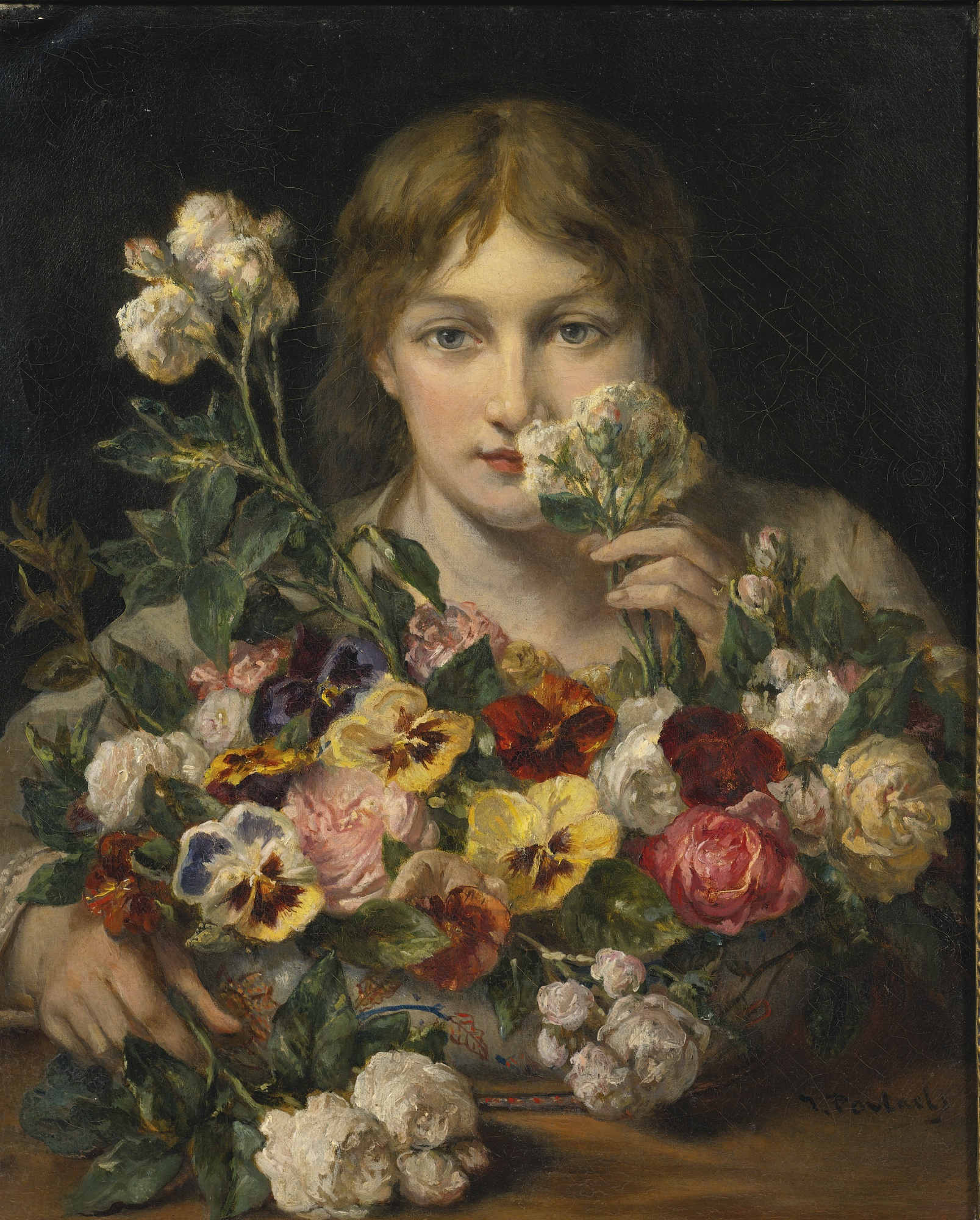
Sweet flowers

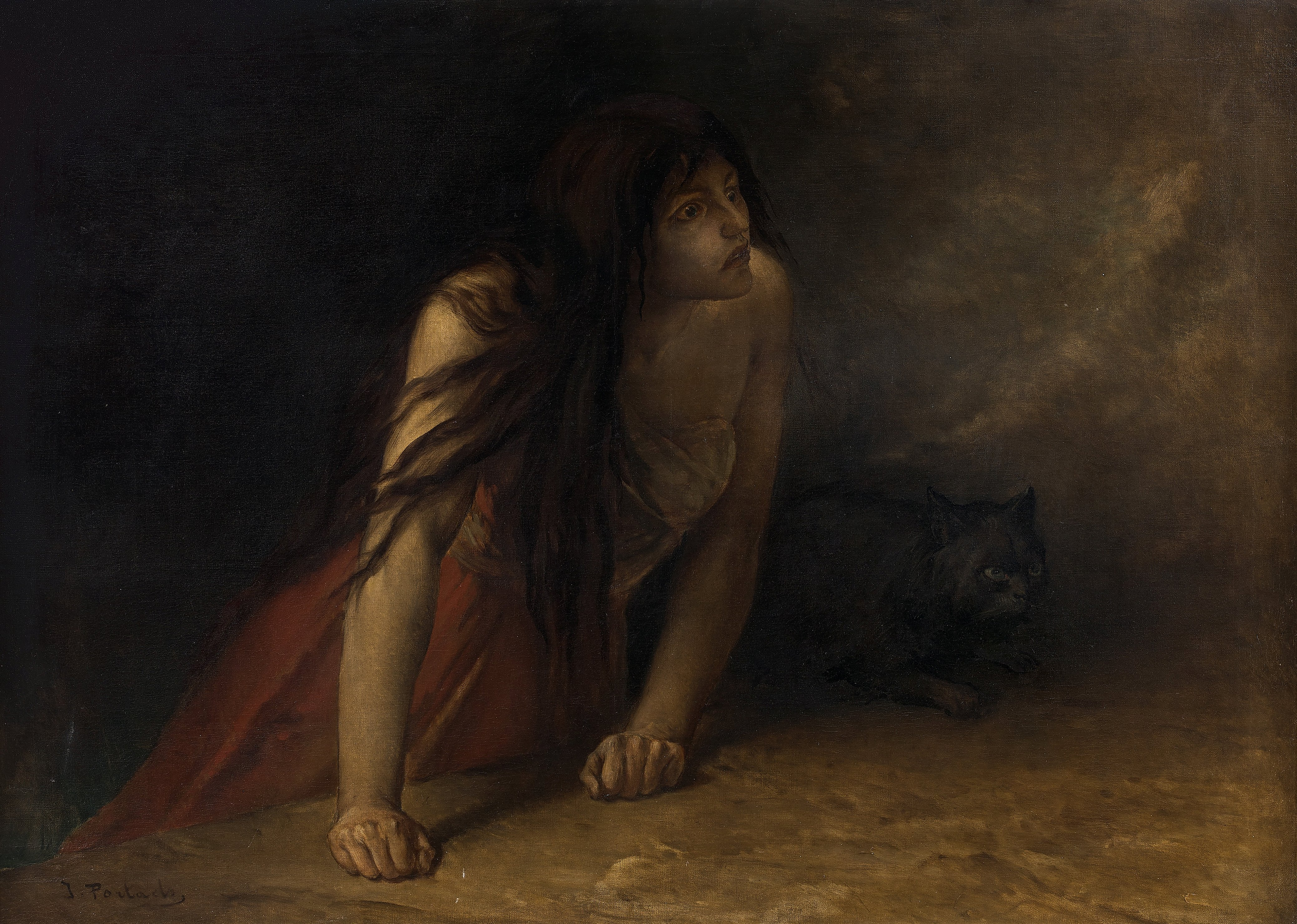
The witch

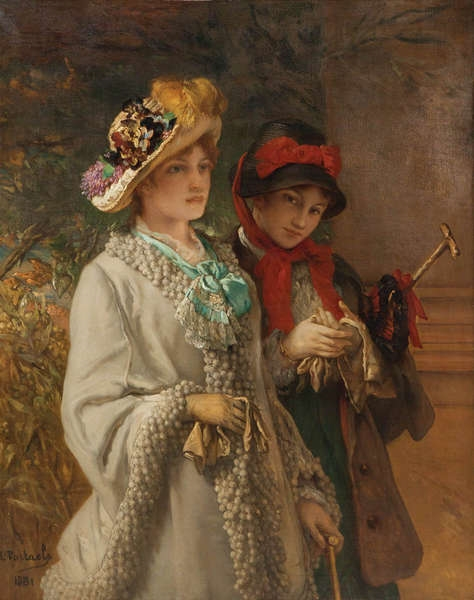
Young girl and her governess

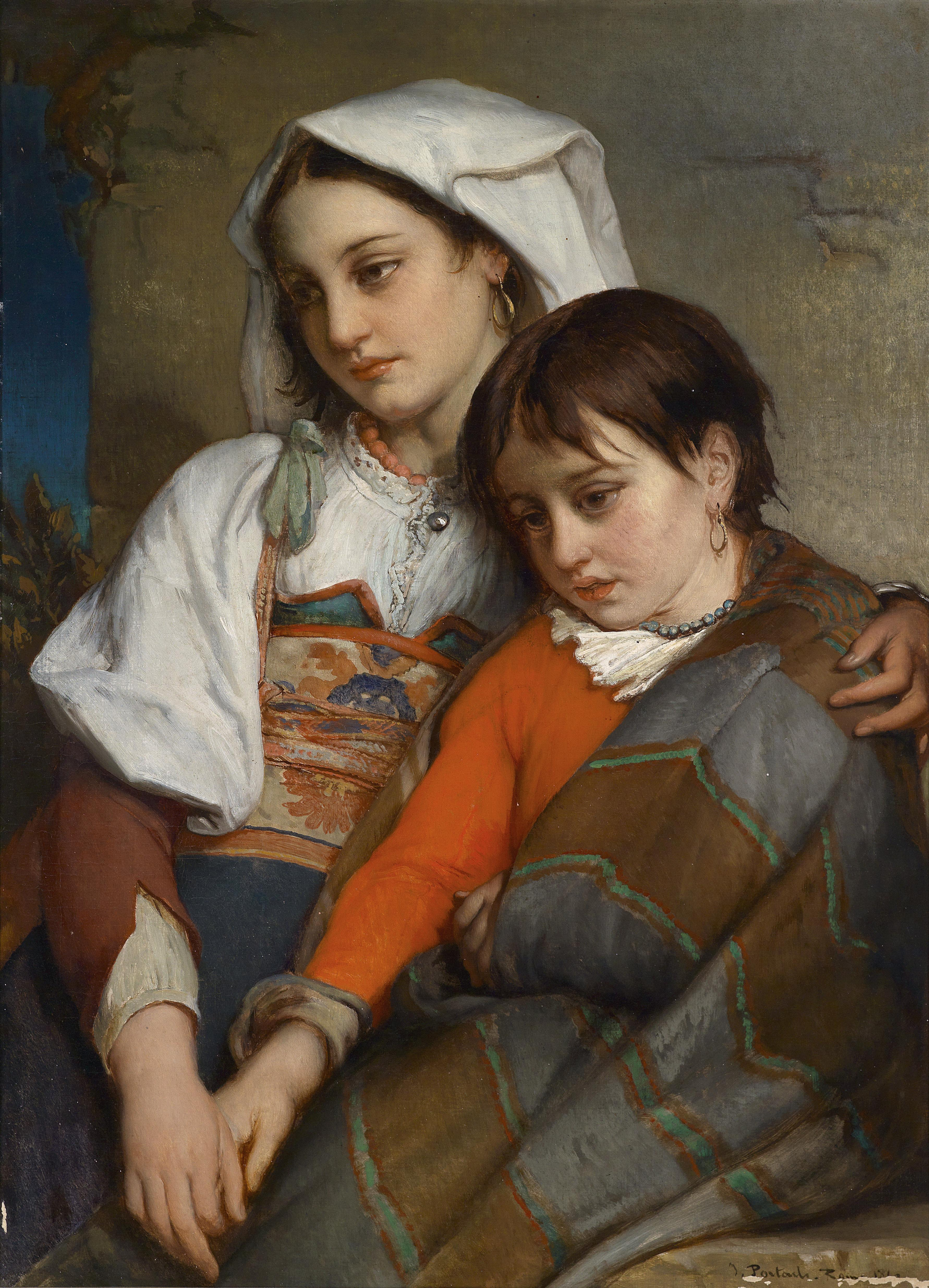
Sisters

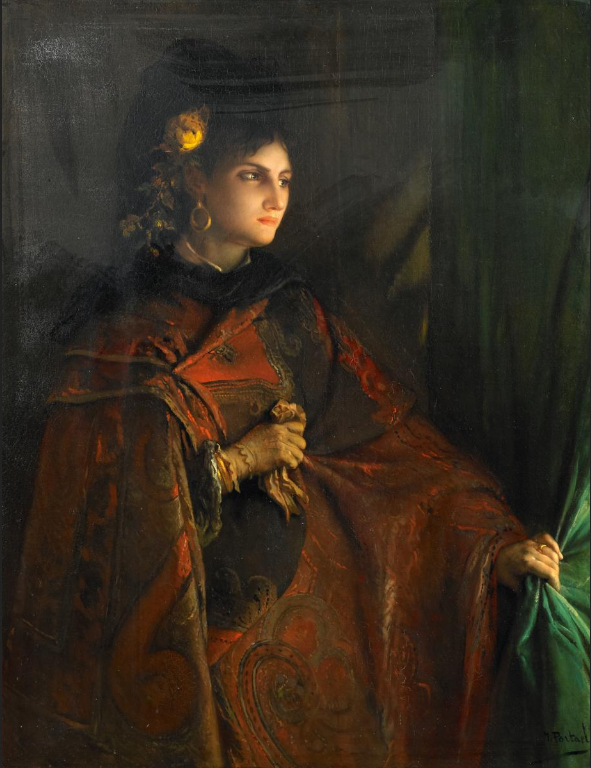
Jealous woman

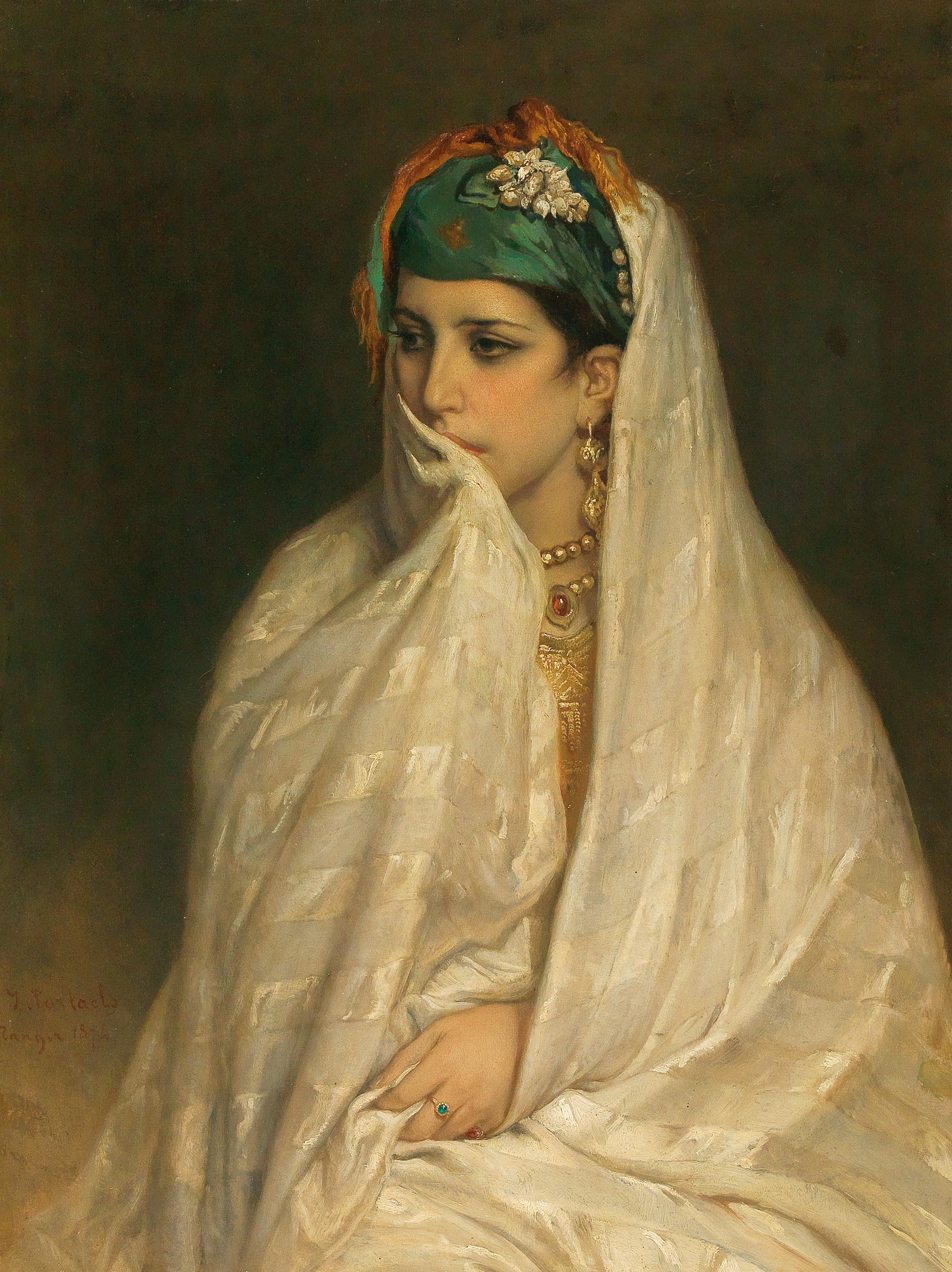
Jewish woman from Tangier

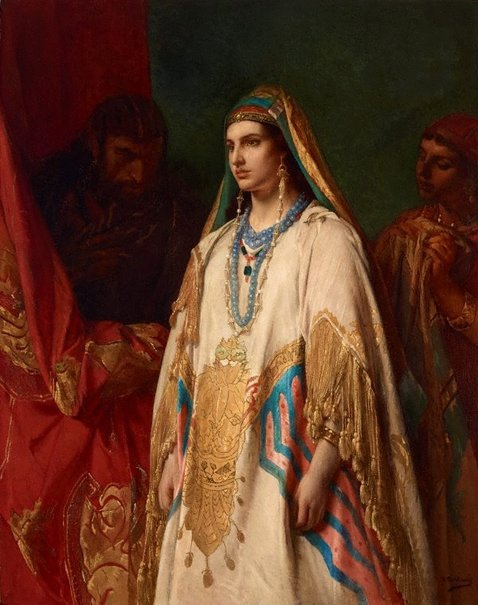
Esther

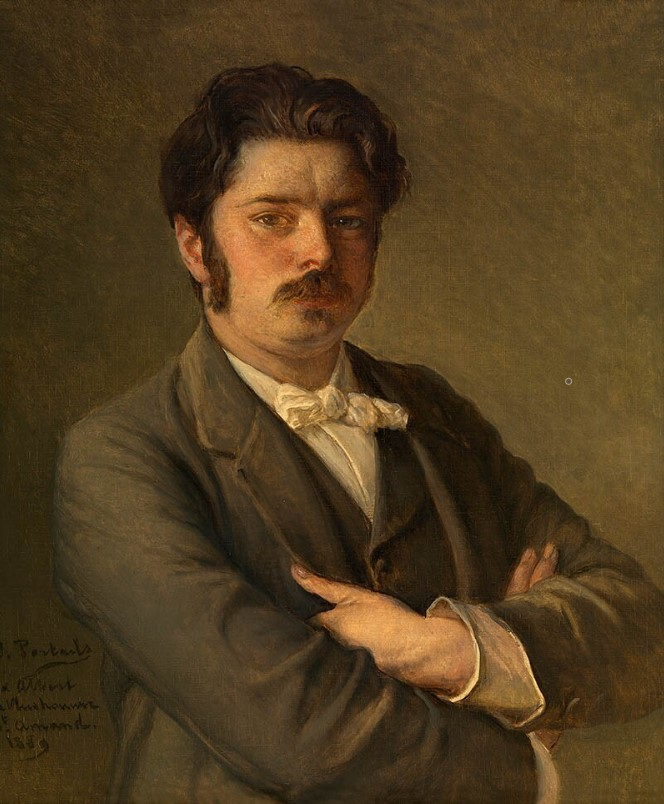
Portrait of Albert De Vleeshouwer

== See also ==
- List of Orientalist artists
- Orientalism
