= Josse Impens =

Belgian painter

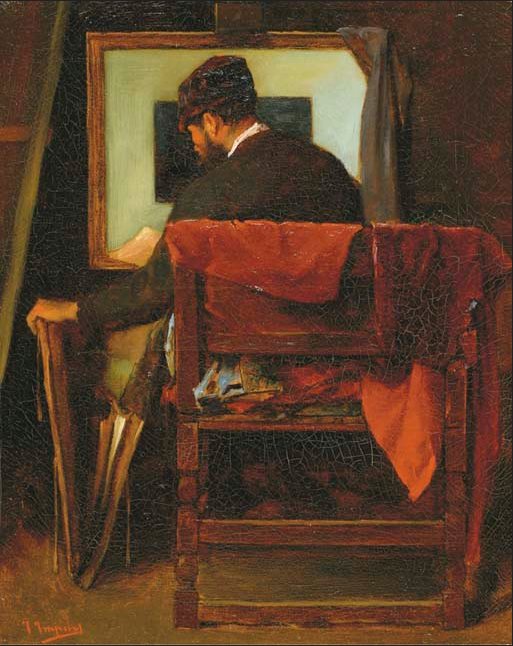
- Painter in front of his easel (self portrait)
- Born: Josse Impens ca. 1840; Brussels, Belgium
- Died: ca. 1905; Schaerbeek, Belgium
- Education: Académie Royale des Beaux-Arts
- Occupation: Painter

Josse Impens (1840–1905) was a Belgian painter known for his interior scenes, genre scenes, portraits and nudes. He painted a number of scenes of artists and women in artist studios seen from the back. He also painted some city views.

== Life ==
Impens was born in Brussels. He studied in his home town at the Académie Royale des Beaux-Arts where Jean-François Portaels was one of his teachers. Portaels was a prominent painter of genre scenes, biblical stories, landscapes, portraits and Orientalist subjects and the founder of the Belgian Orientalist school. Portaels further operated a private art studio in which he trained the next generation of Belgian painters. Impens was also one of the students in Portaels' private studio.

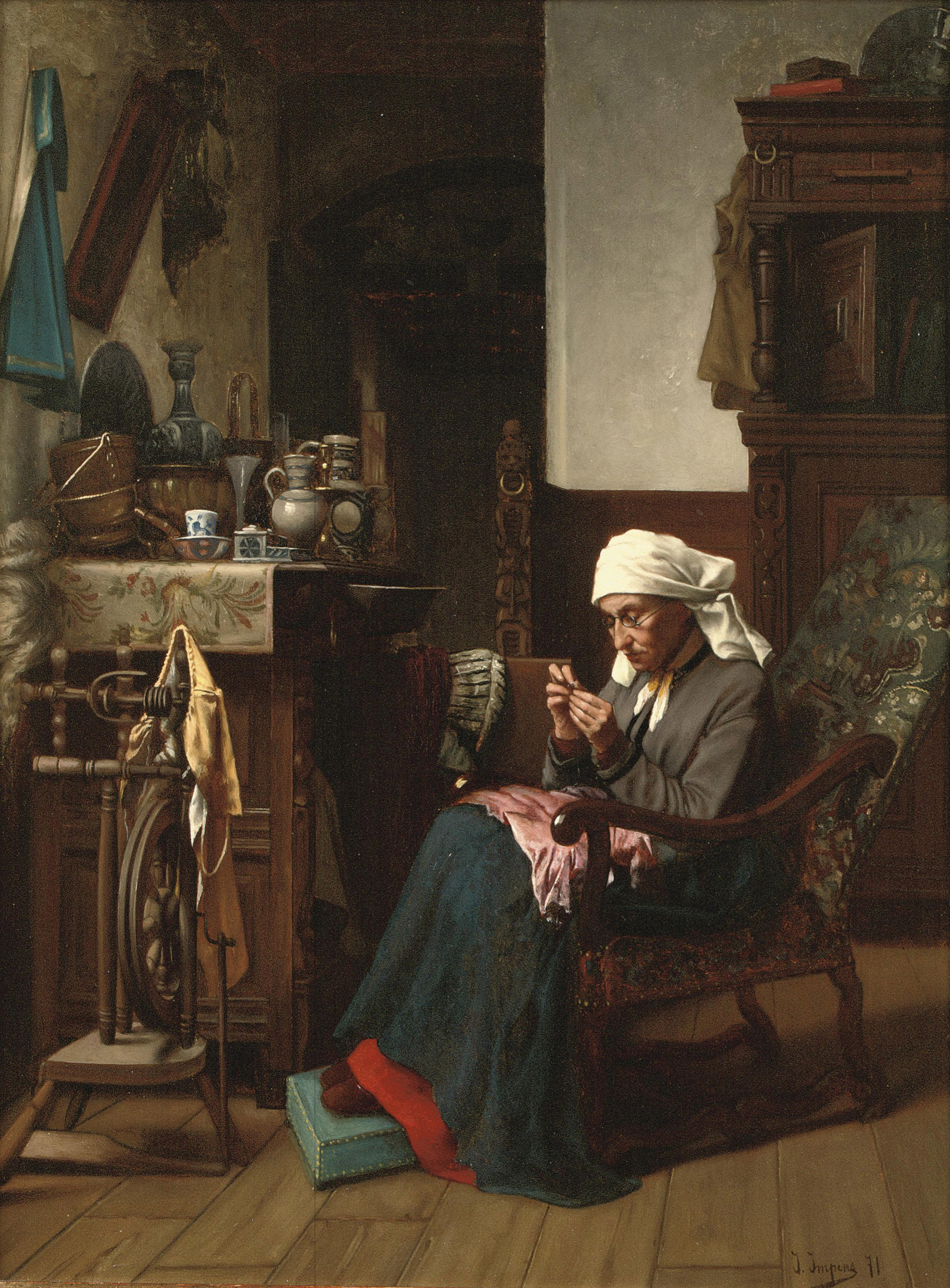
Old lady sewing

Impens exhibited works at the salons in Brussels (1891 and 1896) and Munich (1891 and 1894).

He lived and worked in Schaerbeek where he died in 1905.

== Work ==
Impens is known for his genre scenes, portraits and nudes. He painted a number of interior scenes of inns and cabarets in the old part of Brussels. Other interior scenes depict women doing domestic work or in conversation in what appear to be 16th- or 17th-century kitchens or rooms.

He created some scenes with artists seen from the back in their studios or of women (models) visiting artist studios. He further painted city views of Brussels and portraits. Impens also painted some scenes of life in the countryside and people at work on the land.

His works are close to those of the Oyens brothers. They are characterized by a rapid technique, a brilliant color and a subtle humor.
