= Joseph Stallaert =

Belgian painter

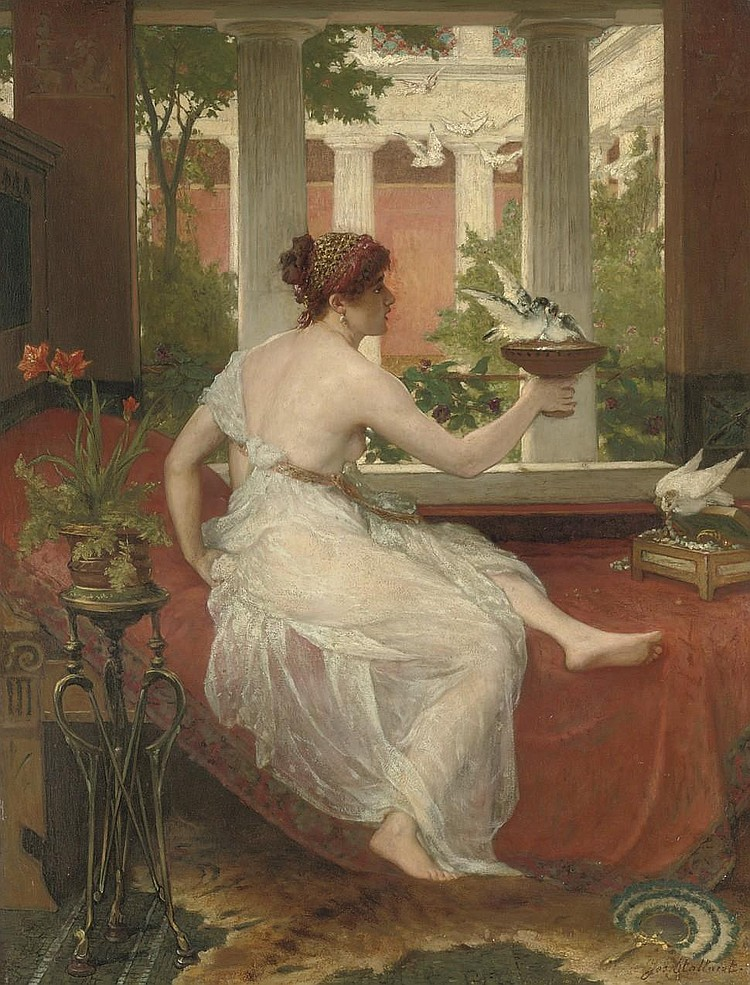
Pigeons

Joseph Stallaert (19 March 1825 – 24 November 1903) was a Belgian painter and art educator. He is known for his scenes from antiquity executed in a Classicistic and Academic style going back on the French models of Louis David.

== Life ==
Joseph Jean François Stallaert was born on 19 March 1825 in Merchtem, a small town in the Flemish-speaking part of Brabant. Although a merchant, his father was very interested in literature and drama. With the encouragement of his father his favorite reading at age 12 were Dutch-language translations of Virgil and the Bible. His paternal grandfather was a Flemish poet and his brother, Charles Stallaert, became a Flemish-language writer. His family moved in 1838 to Brussels where his parents were merchants. They originally destined Joseph for a career in business and at the age of 15, he joined a trading firm, where he earned 100 francs a month. The person he was apprenticed to was the uncle of the landscape painter Edmond De Schampheleer, who discovered Stallaert's artistic ambitions. De Schampheleer arranged for him to take lessons in the studio of François-Joseph Navez, a Belgian Neoclassical painter who had studied under Louis David and was known for his portraits and genre scenes.

After his father's death, Joseph openly declared his intention to become a painter. In 1839, he enrolled at the Royal Academy of Fine Arts in Brussels and, in 1841, he formally became a student of Navez with whom he studied about 4 to 5 years.

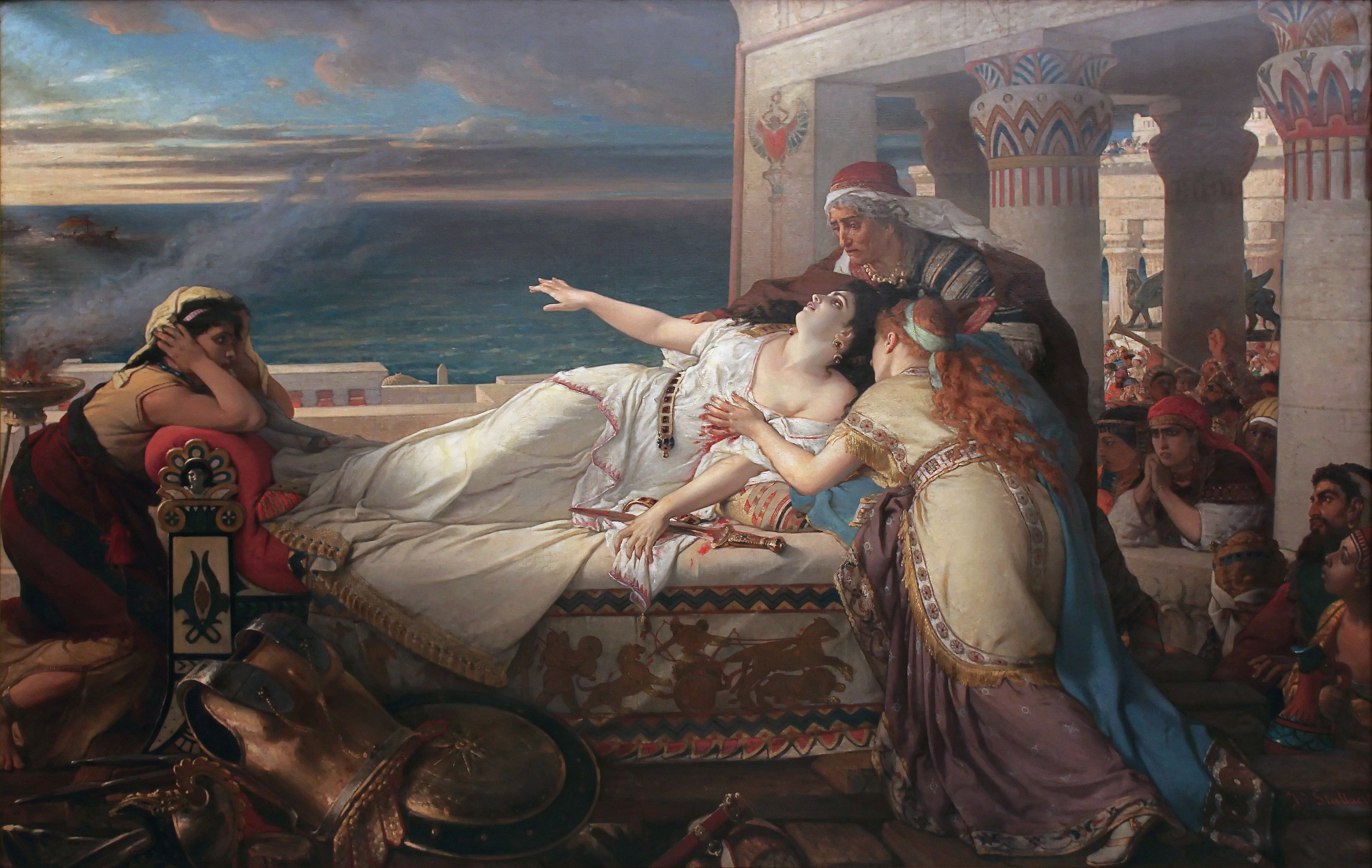
The Death of Dido (1872)

In 1847, he won the Prix de Rome, a scholarship for arts students which allowed him to travel to Rome to study. He made the traditional trip via France. But the French Revolution of 1848 prevented him from staying in Paris. So he continued his itinerary, accompanied by Théodore-Joseph Canneel, visiting Turin, Genoa, Pisa and Florence, before arriving in Rome on 22 May 1848. There too, the Revolutions of 1848 were wreaking havoc and hampering the two artists' studies. They wanted to visit Greece, but they were prevented from leaving Rome and had to live through the turmoil in a state of constant agony. In Rome he became acquainted with Alexandre Cabanel and was influenced by Raphael. Stallaert stayed in Italy until 1852 travelling back through Livorno, Florence, Venice and Germany.

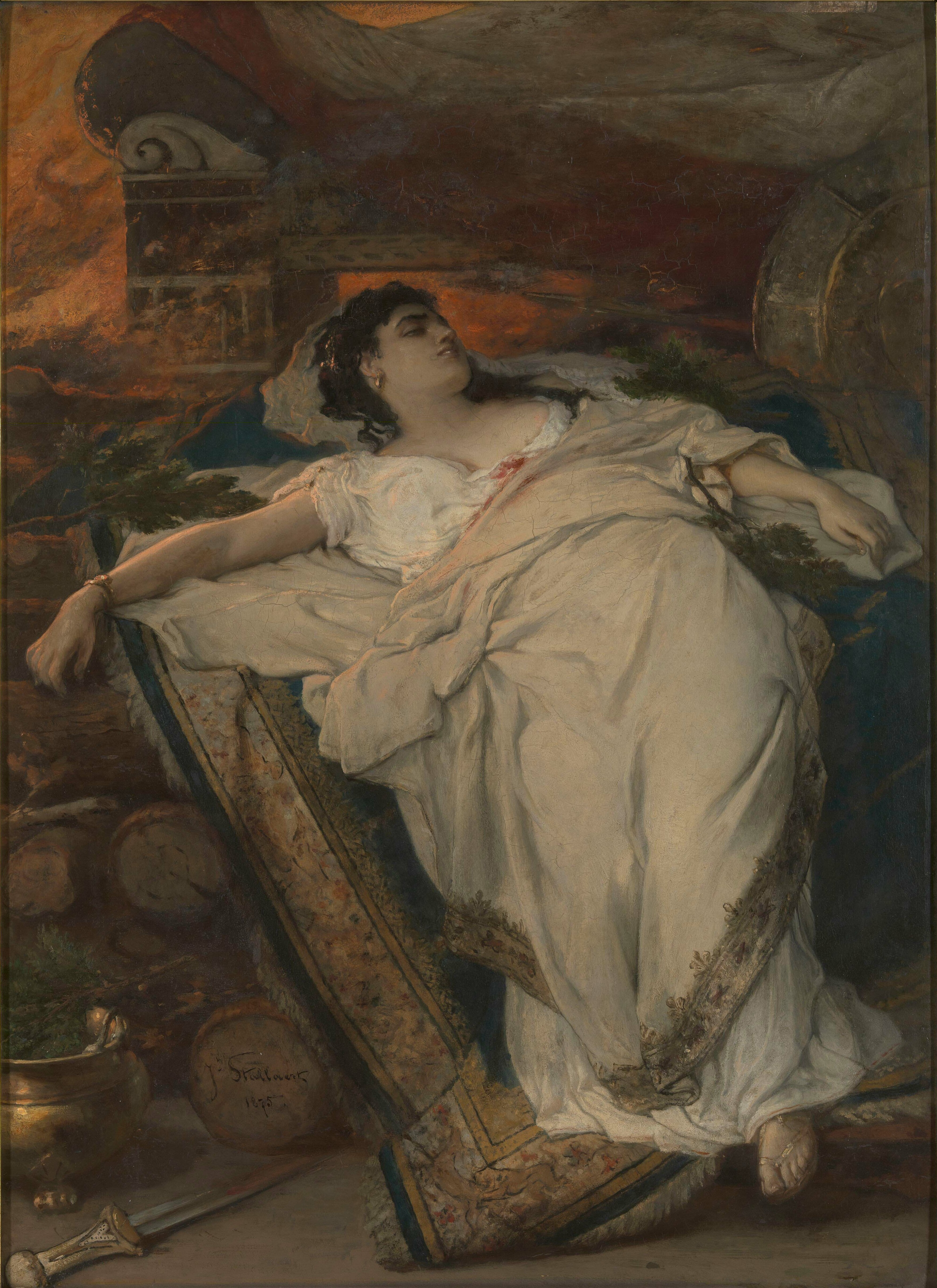
Polyxena sacrificed on Achilles' funeral pyre

In 1852, he became Director of the Academy of Fine Arts in Tournai. His mentor Navez exerted some influence to obtain a contract for him to do a painting for the Brussels Town Hall. He painted the medieval subject of The death of Everaard t'Serclaes in 1854. He married Louise-Henriette Delbruyère on 22 June 1856 in Tournai. He obtained a gold medal at the Brussels Salon of 1860. In 1865, he was selected to be the first teacher of "Drawing and Painting from Nature" at the Royal Academy of Fine Arts in Brussels. He held several important positions at the Brussels Academy over the next thirty years.

In 1895, following the death of Jean-François Portaels, he became Acting Director of the Royal Academy of Fine Arts of Brussels. Three months later, on the basis of seniority, he became Director. His term of office ended in 1898 and he was succeeded by the sculptor Charles van der Stappen. Under the City Council rule that set the mandatory retirement age at 70, Stallaert left the school and received a pension in 1900.

== Honours ==
- 1881: Officer in the Order of Leopold.
