= Floris Jespers =

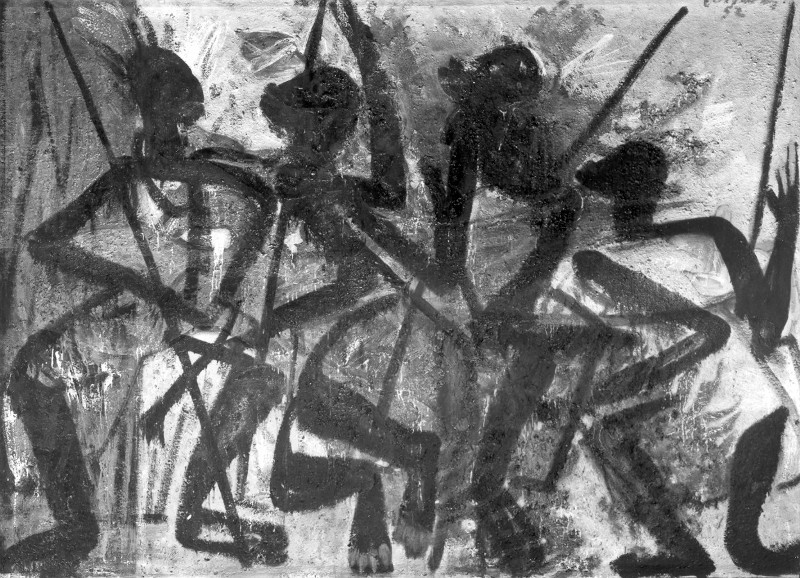
- Oil Painting (Olieverfschilderij) by Floris Jespers, 1952.
- Born: 18 March 1889; Borgerhout
- Died: 16 April 1965 (aged 76); Antwerp
- Education: Royal Academy of Fine Arts (Antwerp)
- Movement: Flemish expressionism

Floris Jespers (1889–1965) was a Belgian artist, known for building Cubism, Fauvism, Futurism, and German expressionism, and an interest in both Kandinsky and Van Gogh into a style of his own in paintings, graphic art, painted glass (verre églomisé), frescoes, tapestry design and his colorful late work, influenced by his travels to the Belgian Congo. As Jespers described his process in 1959:

I had discovered with the Cubists that a painting must be built. Expressionism then taught me that light and air around an object were not enough. The object itself has essential values: shape, length, width, depth. Thus expression ... had to be given to the naturalistic form of the object.

The creator of one of the first Modernist groups in Belgium, he was at the center of avant-garde circles, as a member of De Branding and Kunst van Heden. Alongside Constant Permeke, Frits van den Berghe, and Gustave de Smet, he exhibited at influential galleries like Sélection and Le Centaure, while also serving as the "House Illustrator of the Flemish Avant-Garde," publishing graphic art in periodicals like Ça Ira, Ruimte, and Variétés, which featured experiments in Dada, poetry, and various manifestos. Collectively, these experiments helped create and develop what later came to be known as Flemish Expressionism.

== Career ==
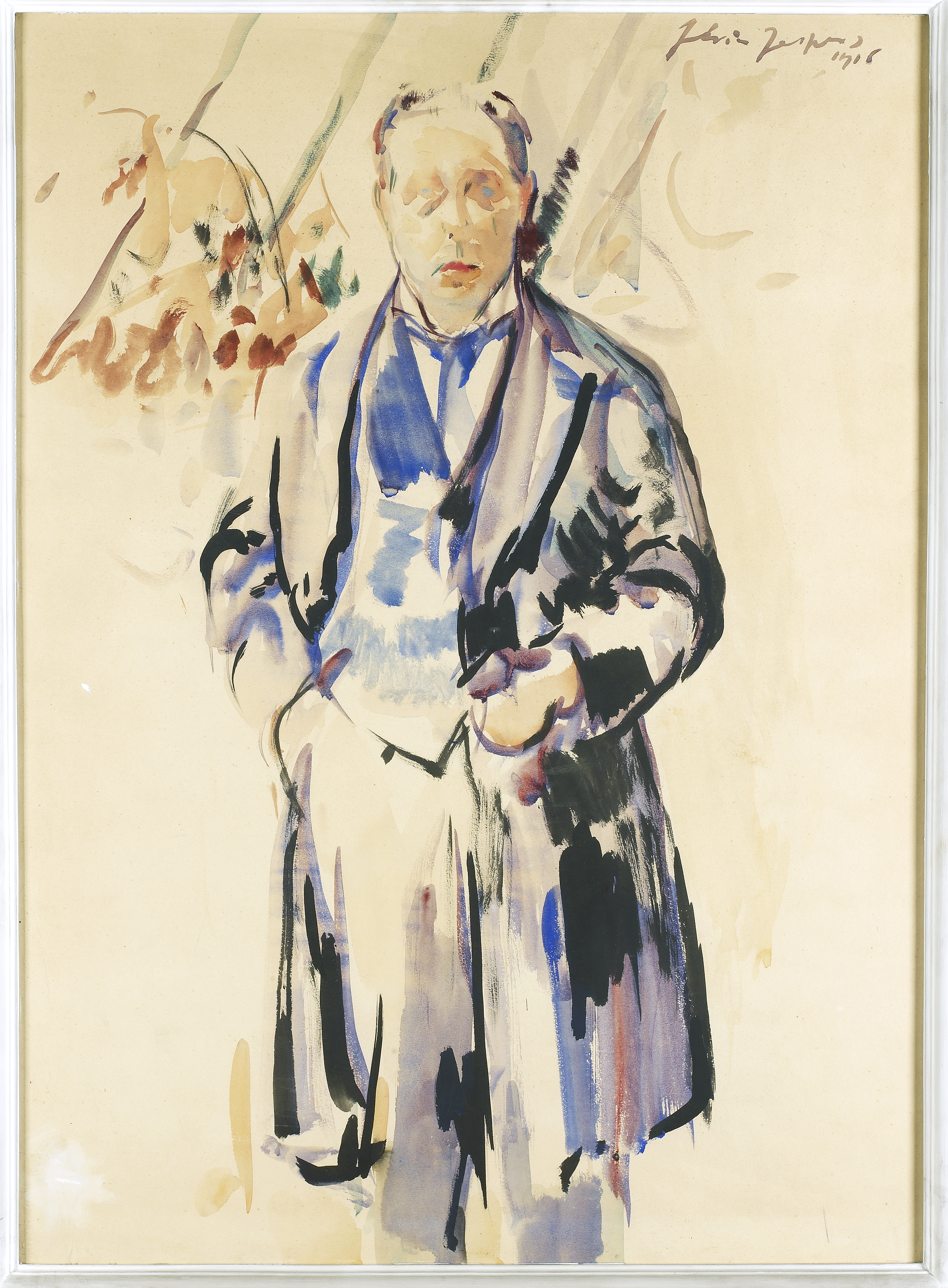
Victor de Meyere, n.d.

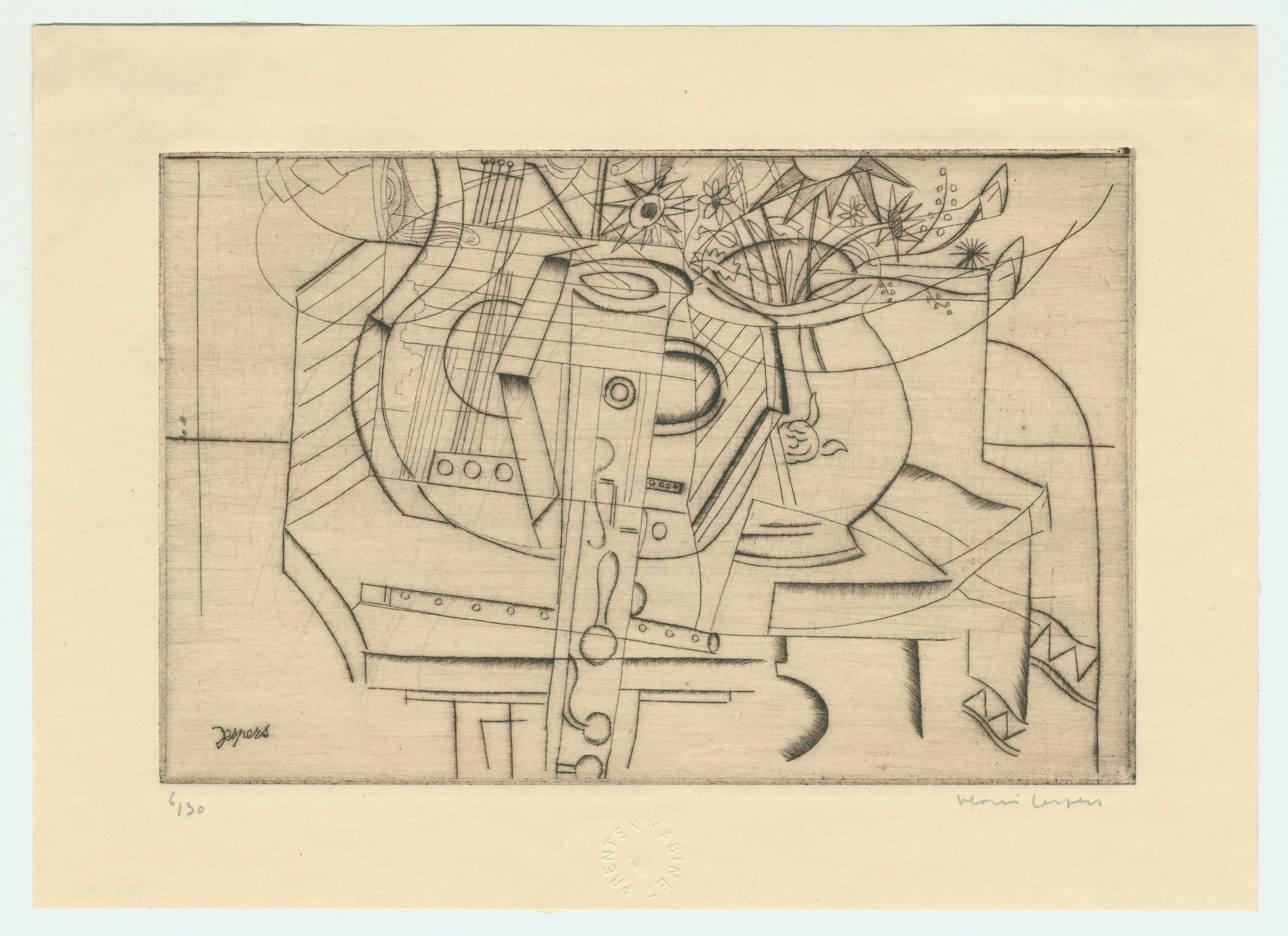
Still Life with Musical Instruments, (Stilleven met muziekinstrumenten), n.d.

The son of sculptor Emiel Jespers and the brother of sculptor Oscar Jespers, Jespers was already enrolled in the Royal Academy of Fine Arts by age 11. He debuted as a painter at age 22, inspired by Cubism, Kandinsky, and German Expressionism. Within a decade, he had met poet Paul Van Ostaijen, who mentions Jespers by name in the poem Huldegedicht aan Singer. Both became active in Antwerp's 1920's Avant-garde while Jespers contributed to the publications Ça Ira, Le Centaure and Sélection and befriended Jean Metzinger and Albert Gleizes when they published Du Cubisme.

In 1921, Jespers exhibited in a group show with Kurt Schwitters and Fokko Mees, both members of the Dutch group De Branding. In 1925, he became a member of Kunst van Heden, a prominent Belgian association also known as L'Art Contemporain, founded in 1905 to promote contemporary art through exhibitions, salons, and publications.

Jespers traveled to the Belgian Congo for the first time in 1951. He stayed in the city of Kamina, where his son Mark Jespers worked as a doctor. The journey was a revelation for him, and he translated his impressions of African women into colorful frescoes. His African paintings are not genre scenes, but they present a greater vision of Africa. From the mysterious gazes and the faces of the swimmers painted in Ostend in 1927 and the Congolese women of the 1950s, a consistent idealised vision of the untouchable and enigmatic African woman emerges.
