= Ça Ira (review) =

Belgian monthly magazine

- Cover of the fifth issue (August 1920)
- Categories: Art, literature, politics
- Frequency: Monthly
- First issue: 1920
- Final issue: 1923
- Country: Belgium
- Language: French

Ça ira was the Belgian monthly magazine that featured avant-garde art, literature and politics.

== History and profile ==
Ça Ira was founded by a group of young artists, who came out of the smoking war-wrecked world of 1919 with a new élan. The title Ça ira comes from a song of the French Revolution (article in French, translated as: "We will win!"). Twenty editions were published in Antwerp from April 1920 to January 1923.

The members (many of whom later achieved great fame and notoriety) included Paul Colin, Theo van Doesburg, the young artist Maurice van Essche who was the leader of the group, Abel Lurkin, Paul Neuhuys, Arthur Pétronio, Charles Plisnier, Han Ryner, while very appealing dada and expressionist woodcuts and linos were added by Floris Jespers, Paul Joostens, Frans Masereel, Jan Cockx, Jozef Cantré, Karel Maes and Jozef Peeters. One finds incidental contributions by Paul Van Ostaijen, Paul Éluard, Francis Picabia, Pound, Iwan Goll, Blaise Cendrars and Kassak.

== See also ==
- List of magazines in Belgium
