= Flemish Expressionism =

Flemish Expressionism, aka Latemse Expressionism
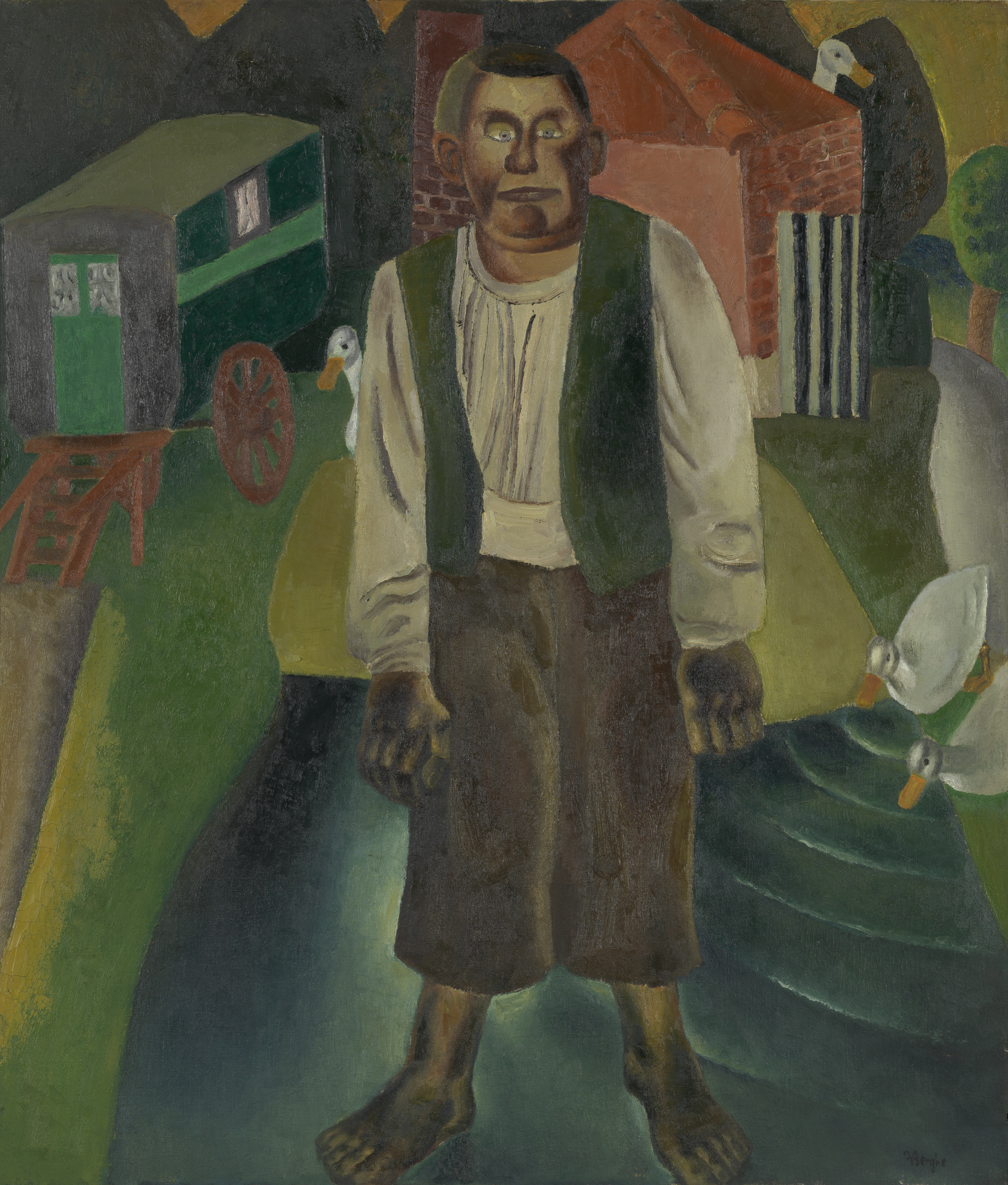
- Frits Van den Berghe, The Idiot by the Pond, 1926, Museum of Fine Arts, Ghent
- Branch: Pre-war: First School of Latem; Post-war: Second School of Latem
- Years active: 1905 – early 1930s
- Location: Sint-Martens-Latem, Belgium
- Major figures: Gustave De Smet, Constant Permeke, Frits Van den Berghe
- Influences: James Ensor and the early works of Vincent van Gogh, in addition to movements, such as: Symbolism; Fauvism; Luminism; Cubism; Futurism; Surrealism; Realism

Flemish Expressionism, also referred to as Belgian Expressionism, was one of the dominant art styles in Flanders during the interbellum. Influenced by artists like James Ensor and the early works of Vincent van Gogh, it was a distinct contemporary of German Expressionism. Contrary to the more rebellious and erotic nature of many German Expressionist works, the Flemish art of the School of Latem was more oriented towards the farming life, and was expressed in earthy colours and vigorous brushwork. It was also, in general, more oriented towards France and Brussels than to Germany, and incorporated elements of Fauvism and Cubism, for example the interest in "primitive" art, of both the ethnic and folk traditions. Flemish Expressionists like Léon Spilliaert were more influenced by Ensor and Symbolism, or like Rik Wouters were closer to the vibrant colours used by the Fauvists. The main proponents were Gustave De Smet, Constant Permeke and Frits Van den Berghe.

== Development ==
The movement originated with the painter Albert Servaes, an artist associated with the first artist colony at Sint-Martens-Latem, also referred to as the first Latem School. From 1905 Servaes' art gradually moved away from the impressionism and luminism of the previous generation of Flemish artists towards a darker palette and a mystical tension. From 1911 on, his influence became visible in the work of Constant Permeke, who is usually considered the foremost master of the movement. It was centred around an art colony in Sint-Martens-Latem, an idyllic village on the banks of the river Lys in East Flanders, near Ghent. Permeke had studied art in Ghent, together with Gustave de Smet and Frits Van den Berghe.

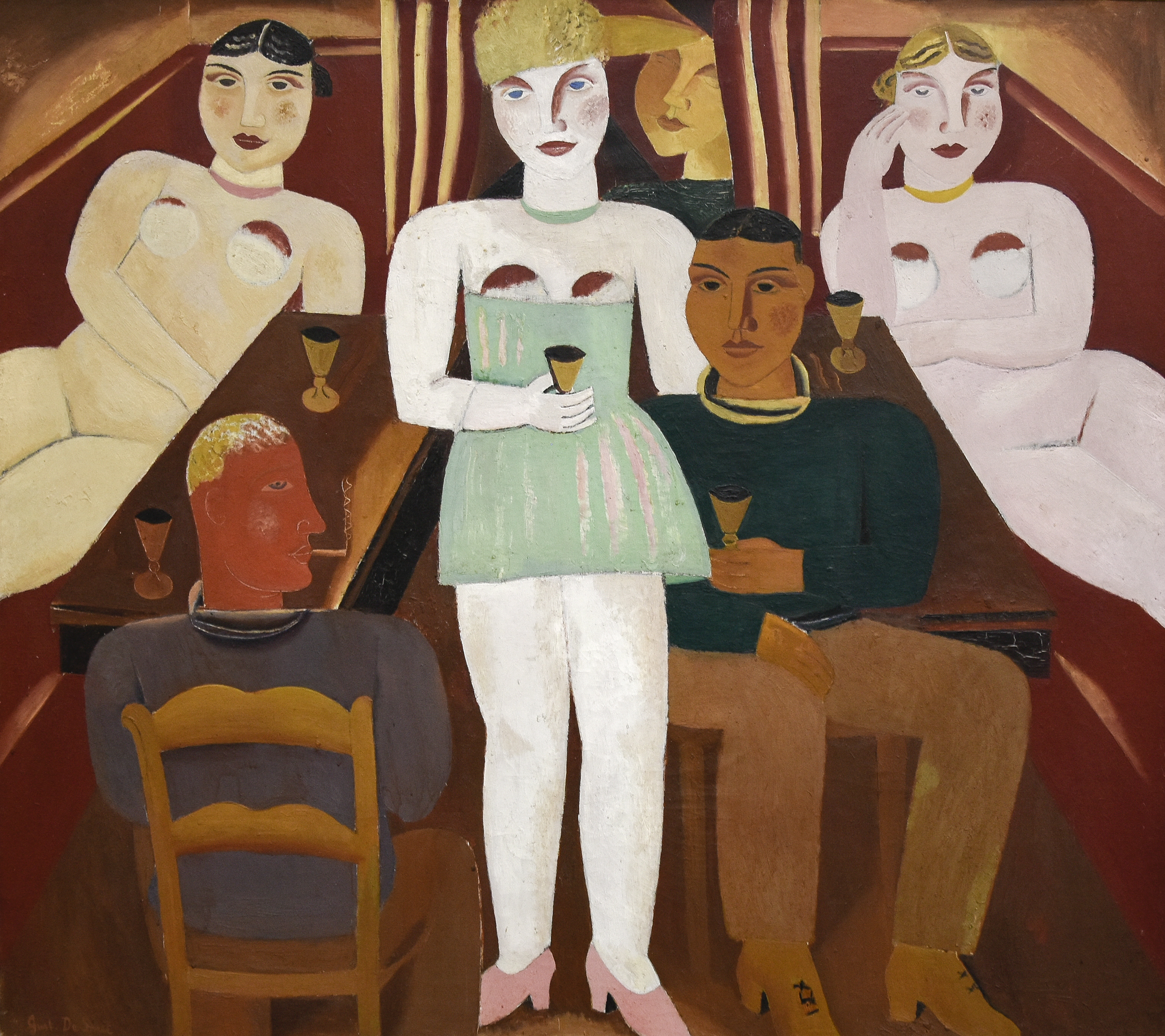
Gustave De Smet, The Good House, 1926, Museum of Fine Arts, Ghent

Before the First World War, emerging Belgian Expressionists such as Frits Van den Berghe, Gustave De Smet and Constant Permeke were inspired by Fauvism and to some extent by Cubism, emulating the bright Impressionist approach of Émile Claus and Théo van Rysselberghe. Rik Wouters in particular was attracted by the Fauvists but he died in 1916 after suffering from a serious illness.

During World War I, most painters from Sint-Martens-Latem fled Belgium: Gustaaf Van de Woestijne, Léon de Smet and others lived in London, where they continued working in a late Impressionistic style. Permeke also lived in England but already painted in a monumental, dark expressionism. Gustave De Smet and Frits Van den Berghe lived in the Netherlands, where in about 1916 they changed their style from a melancholy Impressionism to the new Expressionism, influenced by Dutch painters like Jan Sluyters, the German Heinrich Campendonk, and the French cubist Henri Le Fauconnier who also lived in the Netherlands during the war. This version of Flemish Expressionism, influenced by constructivism, futurism and cubism, continued after the war in the short-lived art colony in Blaricum, where van den Berghe and De Smet joined Jozef Cantré.

After the war, most artists went to live in and around Sint-Martens-Latem, establishing what has been called the second school of Latem.

In the 1920s, while Permeke, De Smet and Van den Berghe painted in Ghent, at the European level it was Brussels which became closely associated with the evolving Flemish Expressionist scene. By 1930, Van den Berghe had been attracted by Surrealism while Realism had influenced the work of De Smet. On the other hand, Edgard Tytgat developed his Expressionist style rather later than the others. Concentrating on story telling, he presented a somewhat satirical view of mankind, especially in his paintings of men and women.

Flemish Expressionism has been called "Belgium's most important contribution to modern art".

== Artists ==
- James Ensor (1860-1949) (more a precursor and influence than a real member of the movement)
- Hippolyte Daeye (1873-1952)
- Gustave De Smet (1877-1943)
- Edgard Tytgat (1879-1957)
- Prosper de Troyer (1880-1961)
- Léon Spilliaert (1881-1946), mixed Symbolism and Expressionism in his art
- Gustave Van de Woestijne (1881-1947)
- Léon De Smet (1881-1966)
- Rik Wouters (1882-1916)
- Frits Van den Berghe (1883-1939)
- Albert Servaes (1883-1966)
- Jean Brusselmans (1884-1953)
- Constant Permeke (1886-1952)
- Albert Saverys (1886-1964)
- Oscar Jespers (1887-1970)
- Ramah (1887-1947)
- Floris Jespers (1889-1965)
- Frans Masereel (1889-1972)
- Jozef Cantré (1890-1957)

== Gallery ==
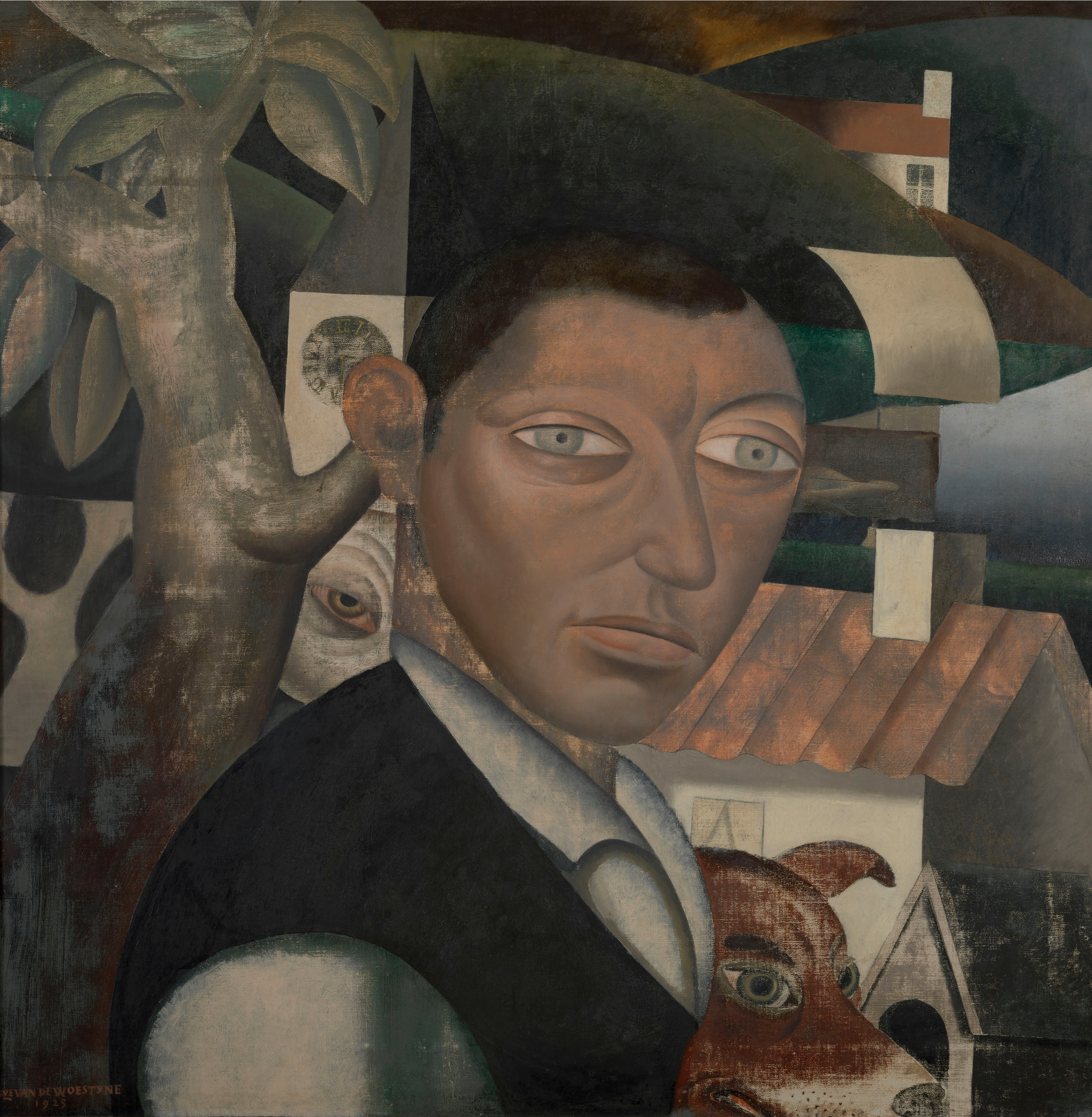
Gustave Van de Woestijne, Fuga, 1925, Museum of Fine Arts, Ghent

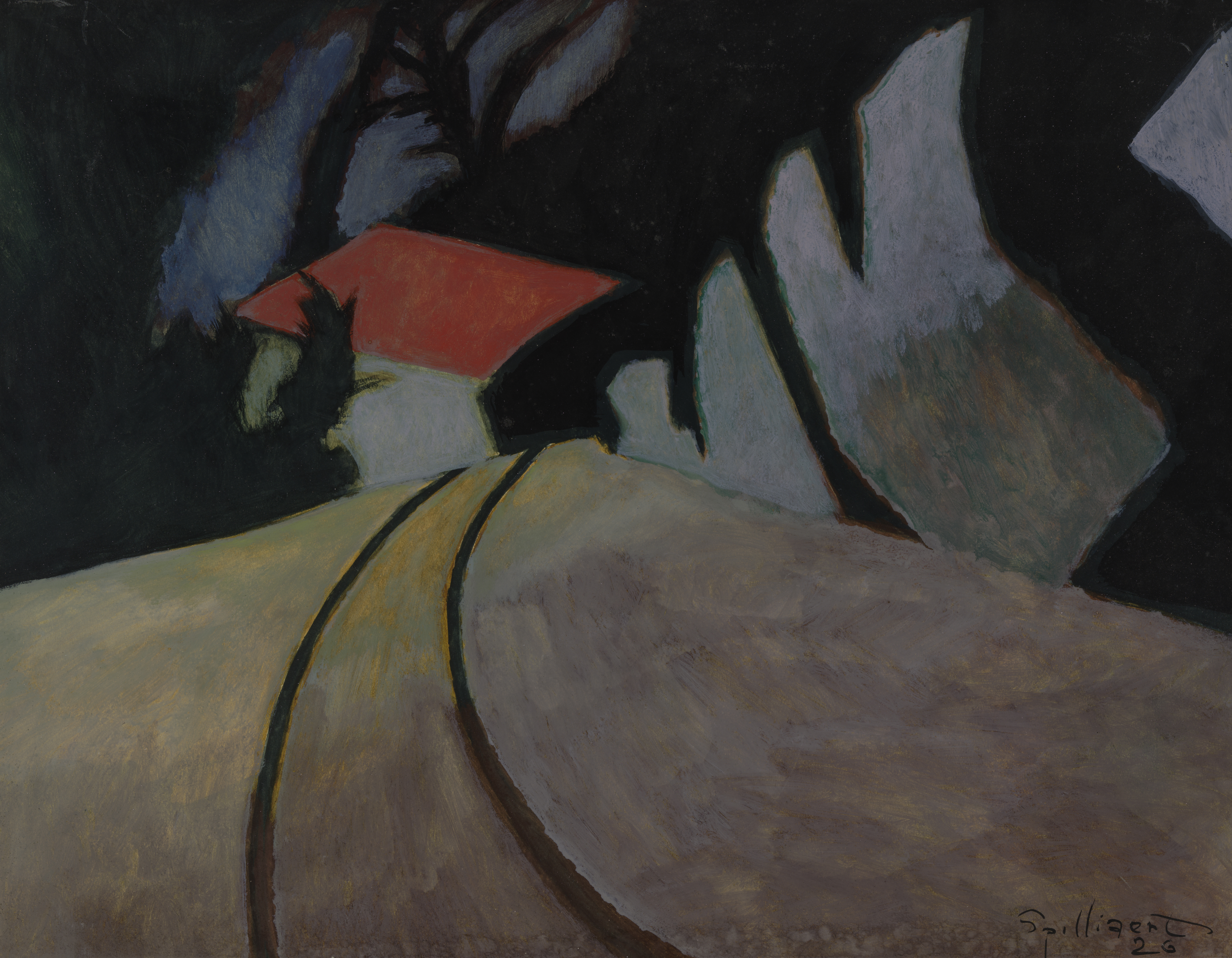
Léon Spilliaert, Landscape with red roof, 1926, Mu.ZEE in Ostend

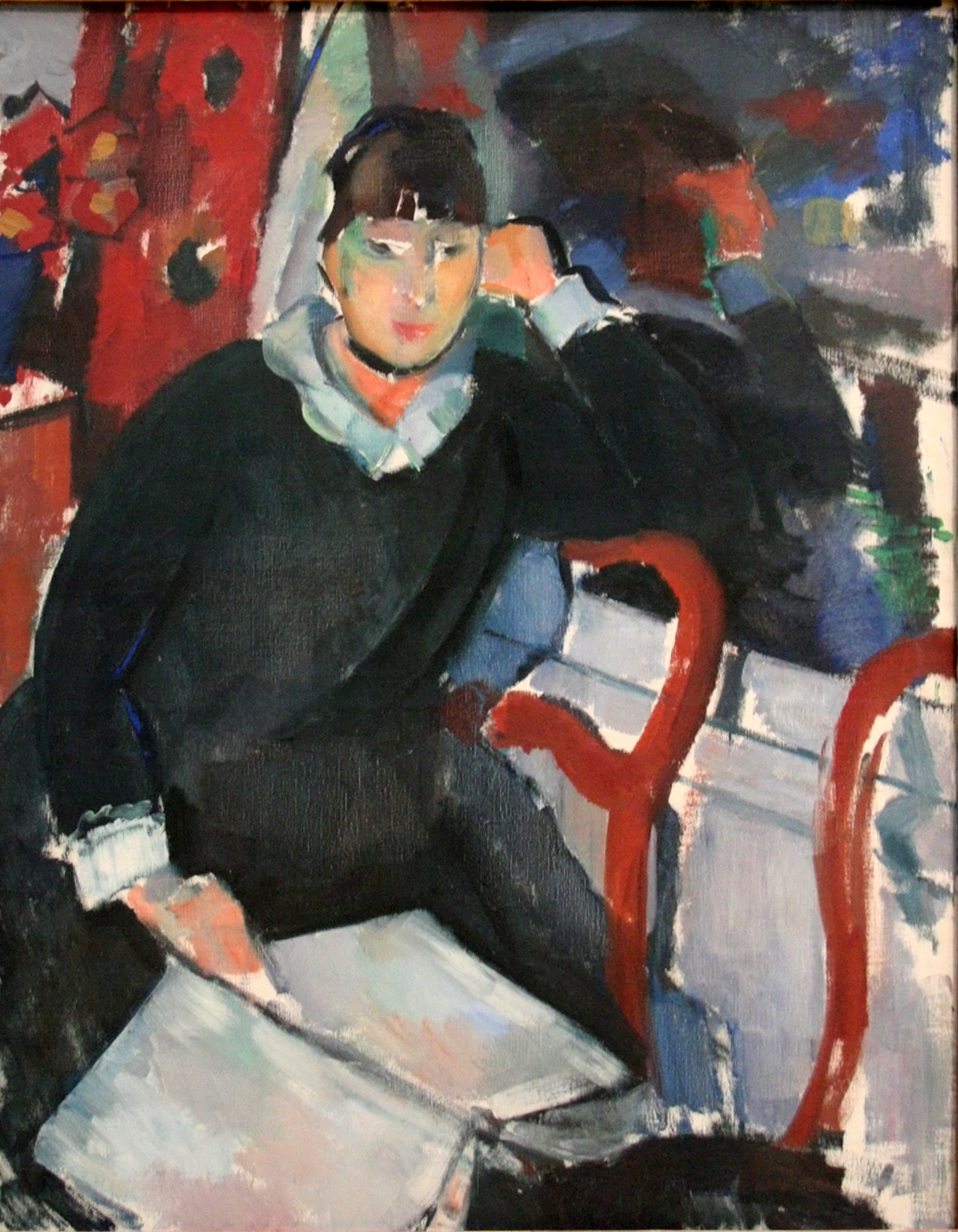
Rik Wouters, Woman sitting at the window, 1915, Museum of Fine Arts, Ghent

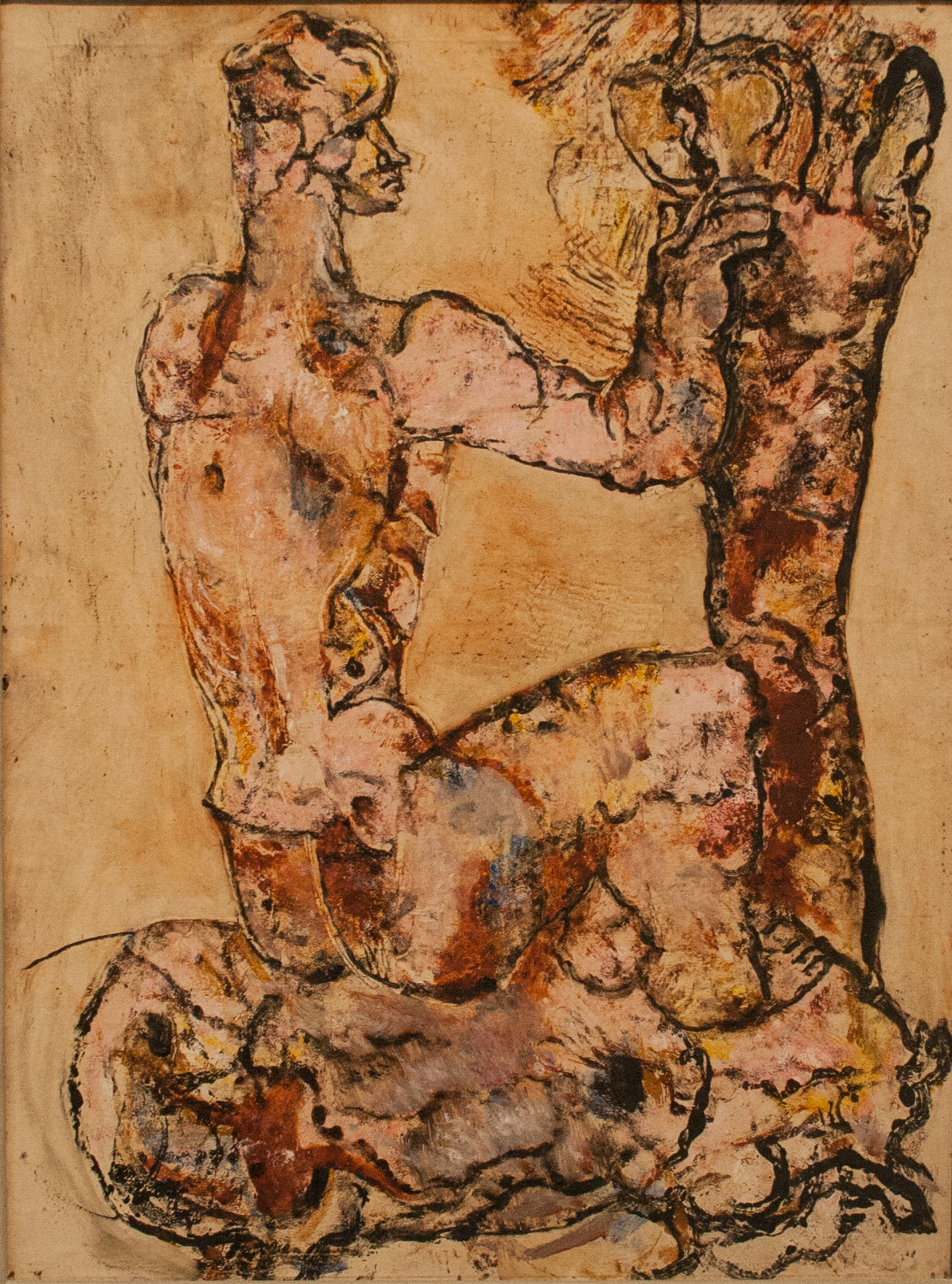
Frits Van den Berghe, Sitting Pink Nude, 1928, Museum of Fine Arts, Ghent

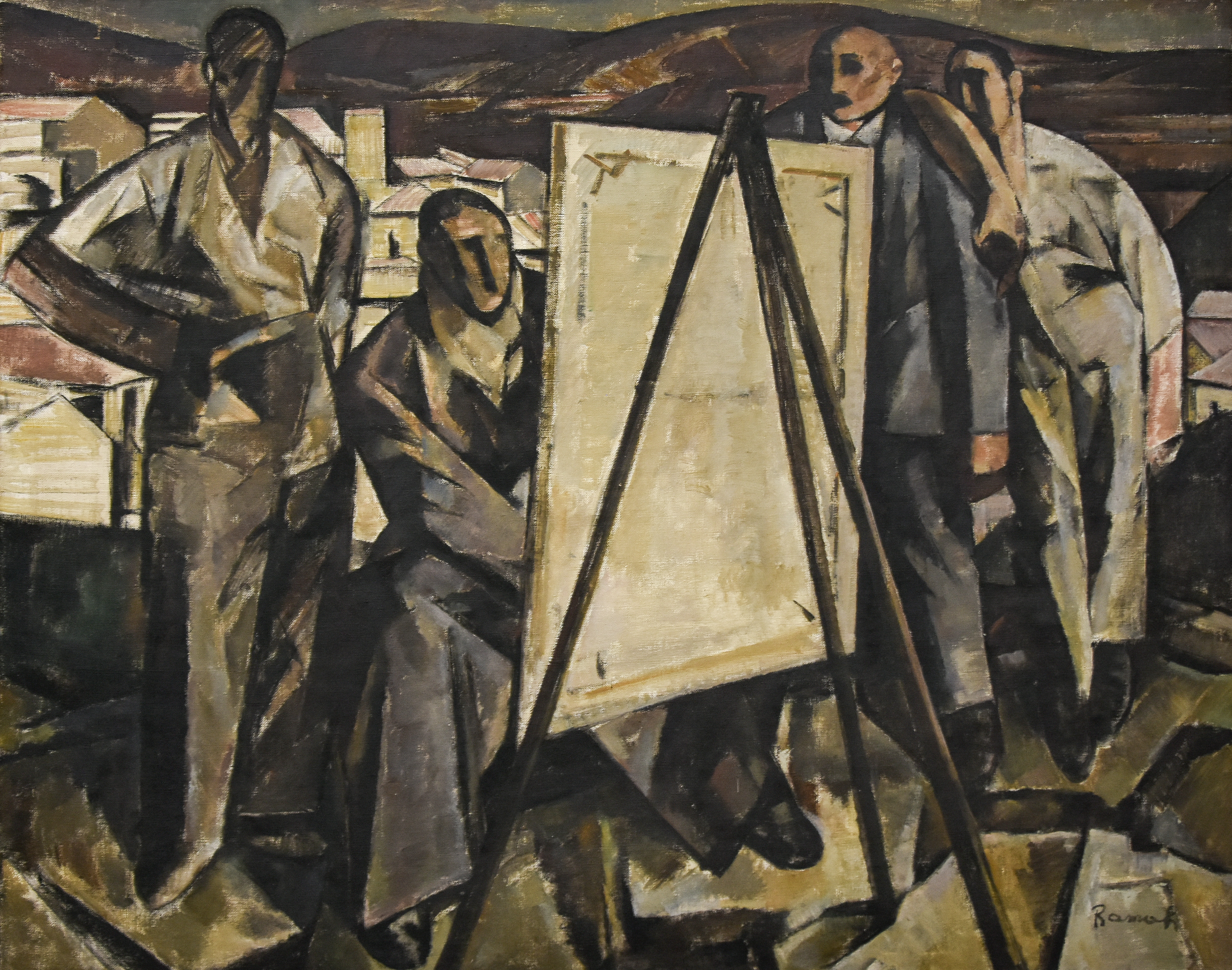
Ramah, The Painter, 1922, Museum of Fine Arts, Ghent
