= Jozef Cantré =

Belgian sculptor and illustrator (1890–1957)

- Born: 26 December 1890; Ghent, Belgium
- Died: 29 August 1957 (aged 66); Ghent, Belgium
- Education: Royal Academy of Fine Arts, De Vlaamsche Hoogeschool
- Known for: Sculpture, illustration
- Style: Fauvism, cubism, German Expressionism
- Movement: Flemish Expressionism
- Spouse: Martha Vandaele
- Children: 1

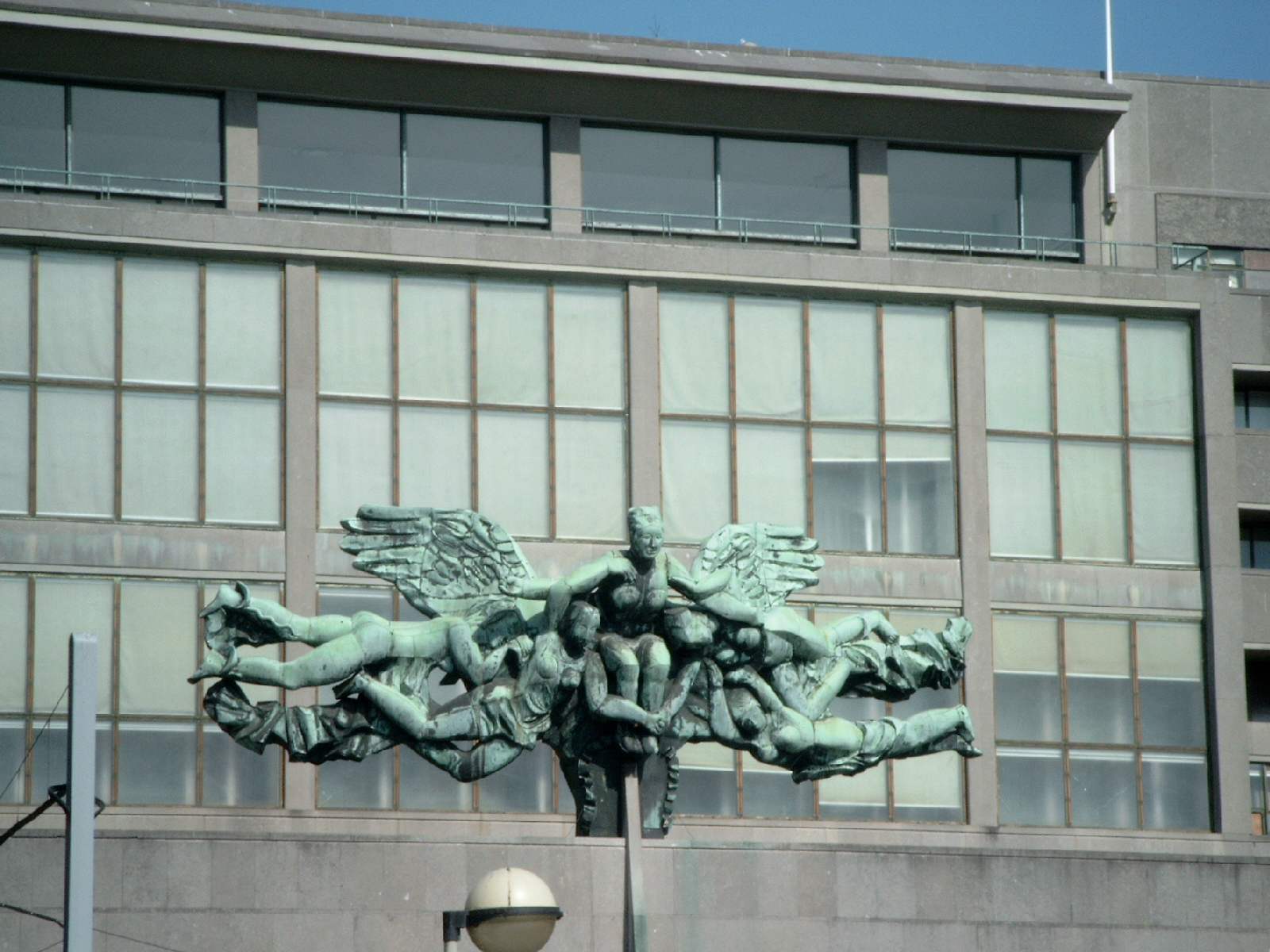
Sculpture by Cantré from 1953, in front of the Ostend post office

Jozef Cantré (26 December 1890 – 29 August 1957) was a Belgian sculptor and illustrator. He was one of the main artists in the development of the movement of Flemish Expressionism.

== Biography ==
Jozef Cantré was born in Ghent in 1890, four years after his brother Jan Frans. His father was a house painter. He studied art at the Royal Academy of Fine Arts (Ghent), together with Frans Masereel; his teachers included Jean Delvin and Felix Metdepenningen. He was politically active in a socialist youth movement and later created the "Rode Jeugd" ("Red Youth").

He studied Literature at the Vlaamsche Hoogeschool from 1916 on, together with the poet Richard Minne. Already in March 1918 he was appointed lector in drawing. His role in this university, created by the German occupier, led to his conviction in 1920, when he was sentenced to 5 years imprisonment. This sentence was removed in 1929.

On 27 October 1918, when it became clear that Germany was going to lose the war, Cantré fled the country. He then lived in Blaricum until 1921 and then in Oisterwijk, both in the Netherlands (which had remained neutral during the war), where he was joined by Frits Van den Berghe and Gustave de Smet. In 1930 he returned to Belgium where he moved to Sint-Martens-Latem, which would become the centre of Flemish art during the interbellum. By 1931 he lived in the nearby Astene, where Hubert Malfait became his neighbour. Afterwards he moved to Ghent.

Between 1941 and 1946 he was a teacher at the Terkameren Art Institute.

He was married to Martha Vandaele; they had one son, Walter Cantré.

== Art ==
His early art is influenced by Georges Minne and Constantin Meunier. Later influences include fauvism, cubism and German Expressionism, before he became one of the founders of the so-called Flemish expressionism.

He was one of the main avant-garde illustrators in Belgium between World War I and World War II as a member of De Vijf ("The Five") together with his brother Jan Frans Cantré, Joris Minne, Frans Masereel and Henri Van Straeten. Most of his graphic work consisted of engravings and woodcuts, as stand-alone works, ex-libris, or book illustrations. As a sculptor, he worked in wood, clay and bronze.

Together with Frits Van den Berghe and Gustave de Smet he is also considered one of the pioneers of the Flemish Expressionism, and together with Oscar Jespers the main sculptor in the movement.

== Bibliography ==
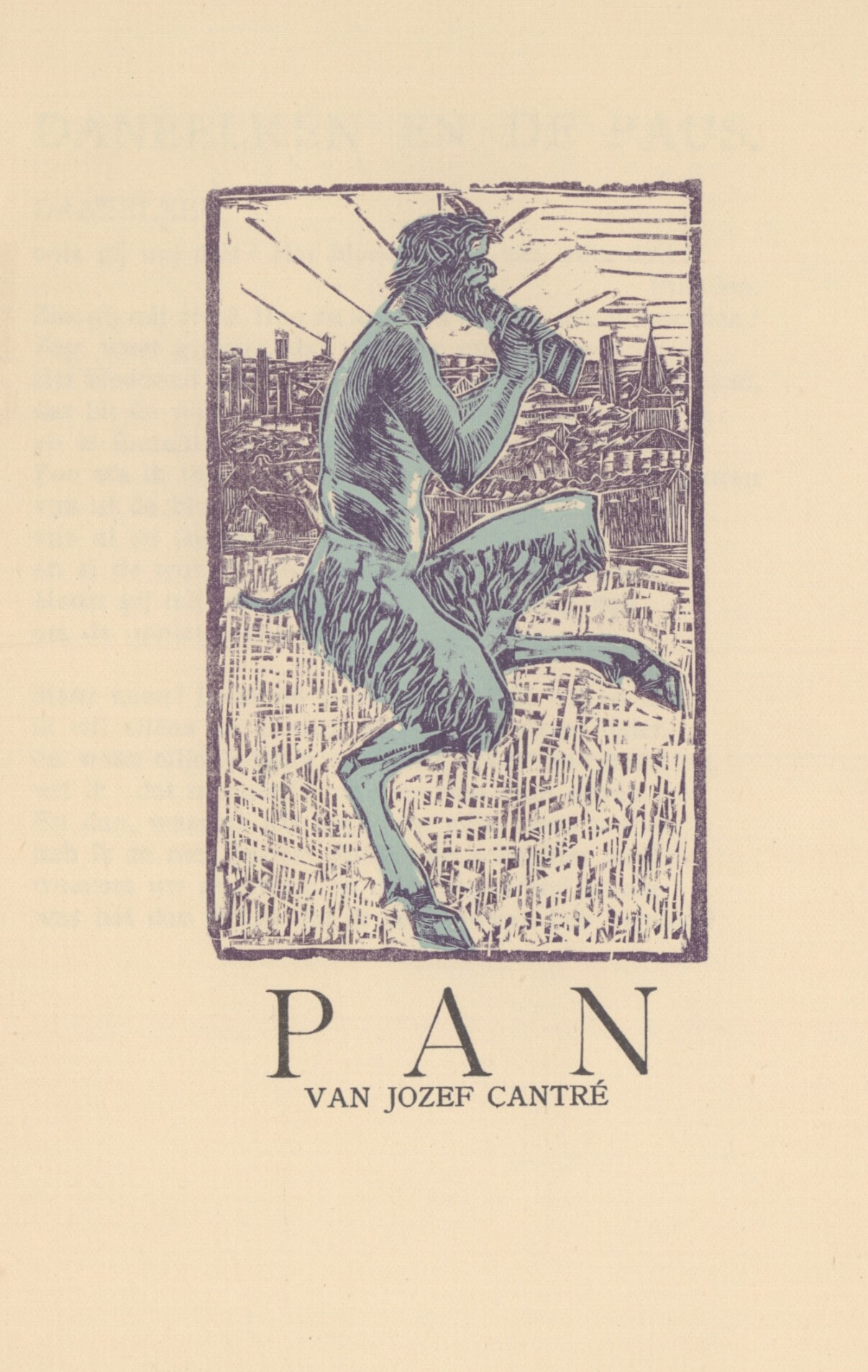
Excerpt from the Flemish magazine Regenboog. Draft for the woodcut Pan of Jozef Cantré. Published in 1918.

- 1918: Maurice Roelants, "De kom der loutering"
- 1918: illustrations, including the title, for the magazine "De Regenboog"
- 1928-: illustrations for "Variétés", magazine created by Paul-Gustave Van Hecke
- 1928: Georges Eekhoud, "Les sorciers de Borght"
- 1929: Maurits de Doncker, "Gedoofder vuren as"
- 1930: Marnix van Gavere, "Gedichten"
- 1933: Willem Elsschot, "Kaas"
- 1937: 7 illustrations for "De boer die sterft" by Karel Van de Woestijne
- 1944: Marcel Arland, "Cinq contes", 6 illustrations

== Major sculptures ==
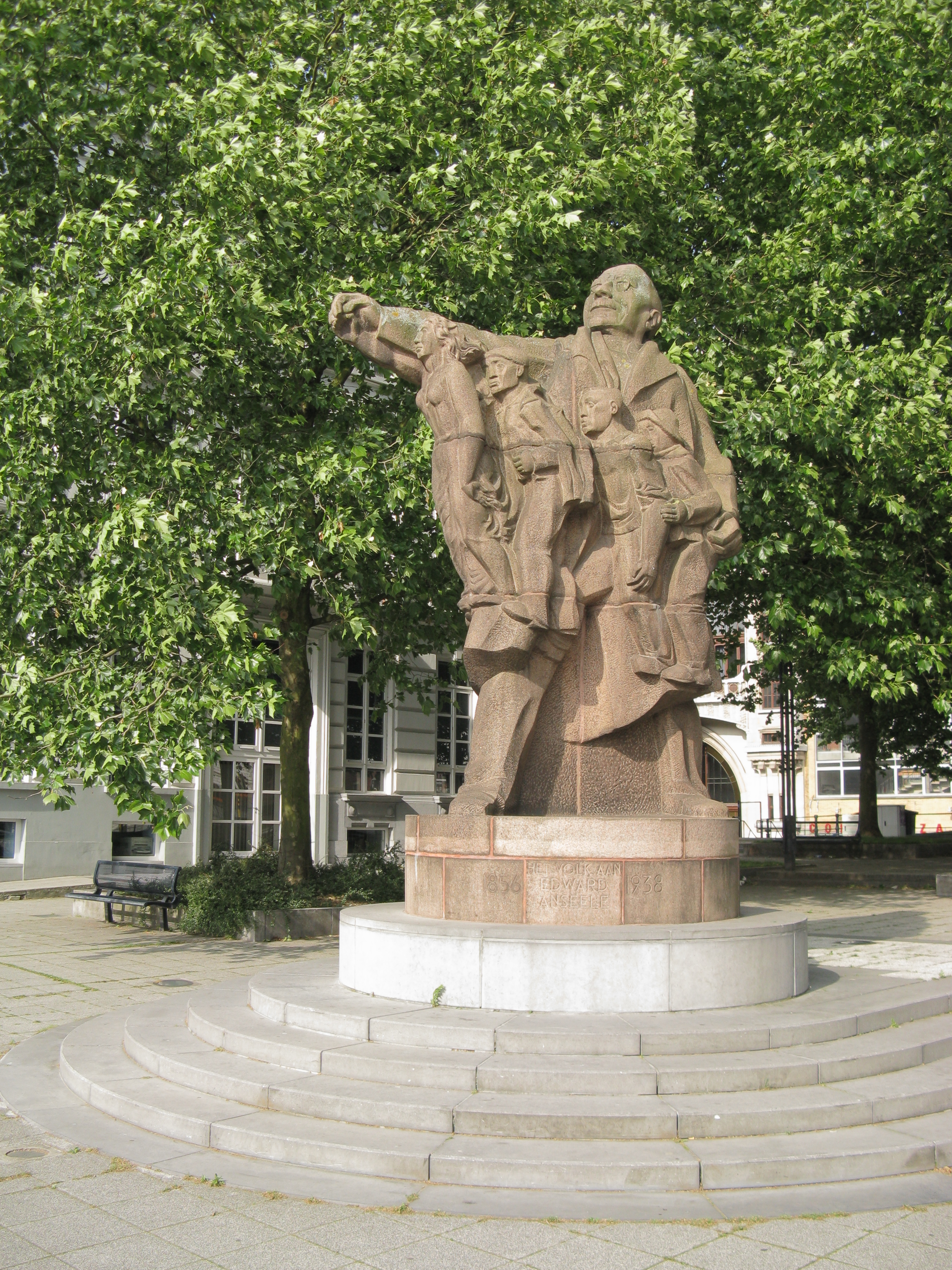
Monument for Anseele in Ghent

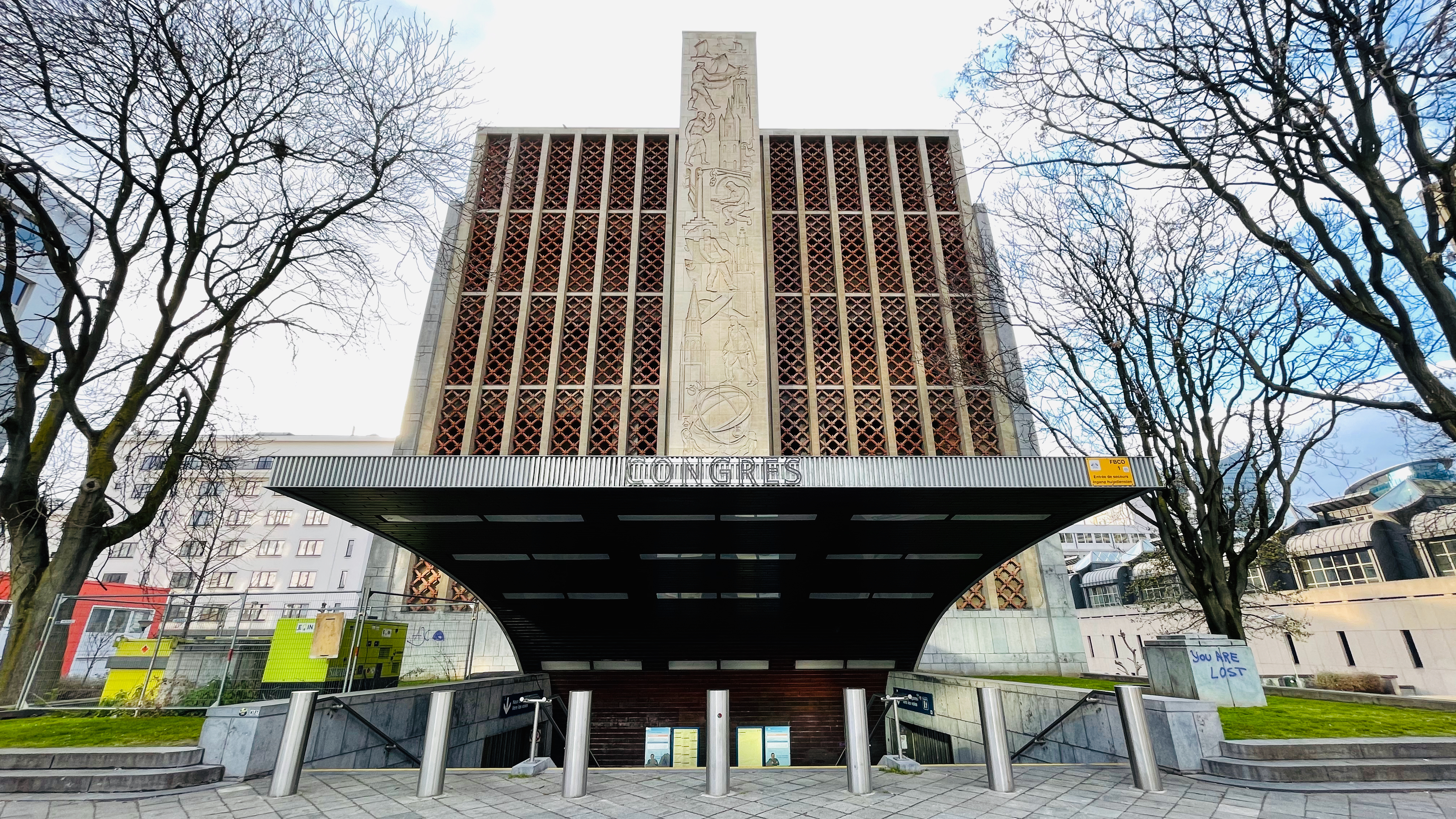
Relief in the facade of the Brussels-Congress railway station

- 1922: double portrait of Frits Van den Berghe en Gustave de Smet
- The poet Karel Van de Woestijne
- Monument for Edward Anseele in Ghent
- 1952: Relief in the facade of the Brussels-Congress railway station

== Exposition ==
- 1921: exposition together with Frits Van den Berghe in "Sélection"
- 1925 (March–April): Basel, "Ausstellung Belgischer Kunst"
- 1927 (June): exposition of 7 Flemish artists at La Centaure in Brussels
- 1927 (August–September): Hamburg, Museum, "Europäische Kunst der Gegenwart", including 10 Belgian artists
- 1927 (September): Grenoble, Museum, "L'Art Belge Contemporain"
- 1928 (May–June): Paris, Musée du Jeu de Paume, "L'Art Belge depuis l'Impressionisme"
- 1932: Antwerp, Museum Plantin-Moretus, solo exhibition of his work between 1908 and 1932
- 1933 (April–May): exposition together with Frits Van den Berghe in the Vooruit in Ghent
- 1942: foundation of the Museum van Latem en de Leiestreek, which includes works by Cantré
- 1957 (December) - 1958 (January): Utrecht, Museum of New Religious Art: solo exposition
- 1959: Brussels, Royal Library of Belgium: solo exposition of the graphic work of Cantré
- 1967 (July–August): Brussels, Royal Library of Belgium: woodcuts by "De Vijf"
- 1975 (September–November): Deinze, retrospective of his work and that of his brother Jan Frans
- 2017 (September) - 2018 (January): Deinze, museum, retrospective of his work
