= Albert Servaes =

Belgian artist (1883–1966)

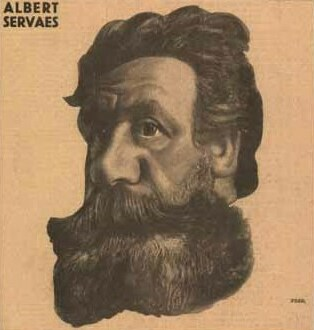
- Portrait of Albert Servaes by Frits Van den Berghe, 1932
- Born: 4 April 1883; Ghent, Belgium
- Died: 19 April 1966 (aged 83); Lucerne, Switzerland
- Citizenship: Belgian, Swiss
- Known for: Painter
- Notable work: The Potato Planters (1909), Stations of the Cross of Luithagen (1919), Pietá (1920)
- Movement: Expressionism

Albert Servaes (4 April 1883 – 19 April 1966) was a Belgian expressionist painter. He was associate with but not a member of the first Latem School of painting which focused on Mystical Realism. Servaes went in another artistic direction and became a founder of Belgian expressionism. He is known for his religious works, typically showing the suffering of Jesus Christ, which stirred a conflict within the Catholic Church. He also gained fame for his expressionist landscapes. After fleeing Belgium after World War II to escape retribution for collaborating with the German occupiers during the war, he lived in Switzerland and became a Swiss citizen.

== Life and career ==
=== Early career ===
Albert Servaes was born in Ghent, Belgium in a middle class family engaged in retail activities. In line with his family's ambitions, he started his career as a travelling salesman for the family business. This did not stop him from painting from a young age and to look for opportunities to practice his art after working hours. He was mostly self-taught.

He moved in 1904 to the rustic village of Sint-Martens-Latem outside of Ghent. Here, a group of artists, later referred to as the first Latem School, had already taken up residence. The group included George Minne, Gustave van de Woestijne, Valerius De Saedeleer, and Albijn Van den Abeele. The first Latem School comprised a group of artists which focused on mystical realism. This was a reaction to the Paris-based Impressionist art that had dominated the painting world for the previous half-century. From 1905 Servaes became interested in religion and mysticism while living in Sint-Martens-Latem and befriended members of a local church community. However, the subtle symbolism of the first Latem School did not appeal to Servaes and he chose another artistic path.

Servaes struggled to live off his paintings early in his career, but he gained fame and recognition in Ghent and Belgium during World War I. Several of his exhibitions near Ghent solidified his name in the regional art scene and allowed him to become financially secure.

=== Collaboration with the enemy and flight to Switzerland ===
Before World War II, Servaes expressed his Flemish-nationalist feelings mainly through his art. He joined Verdinaso, a right wing authoritarian political party which had grown out of the Flemish Movement. During the German occupation, he openly showed his pro-German sympathies. He collaborated with the occupier in its control over the cultural life in Belgium. He was chairman of the Oost-Vlaamse Federatie voor Kunstenaars (East Flanders Federation of Artists) and a member of the Nederlandsche Kultuurkamer, an institution set up by the German occupier, which all artists, architects, writers, journalists, musicians, film actors and stage performers had to join in order to be allowed to work. He was also a member of the Duitsch-Vlaamsche Arbeidsgemeenschap (DeVlag) (German-Flemish Labor Community) which in May 1941 was incorporated in the occupier's SS structures.

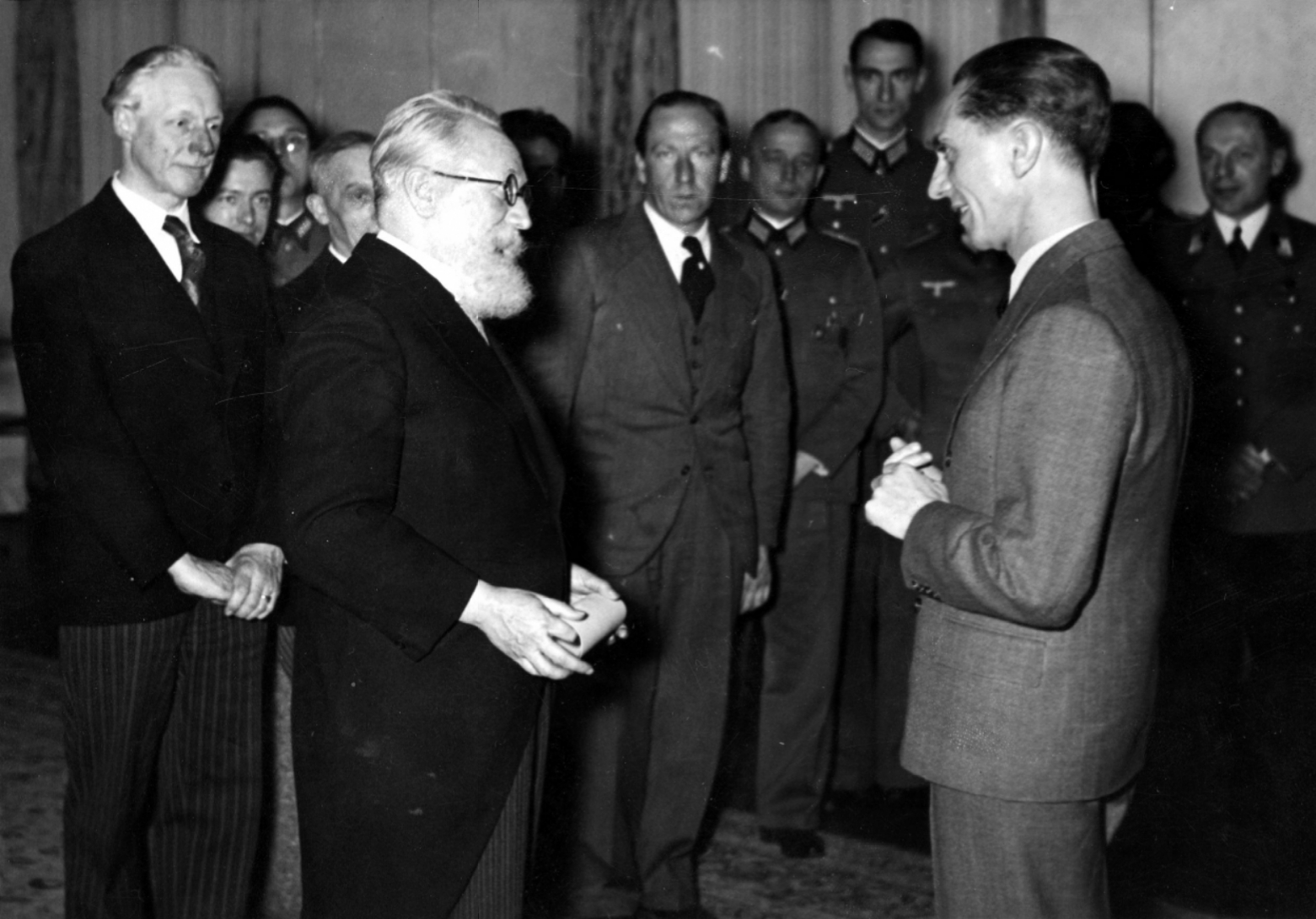
Servaes, leading a delegation of Flemish artists, meets Goebbels in 1940

In 1940, he led a delegation of Flemish artists to Germany where they met with the German propaganda minister Joseph Goebbels. After this trip to Germany, he thanked the "great cultural reformer Dr. Goebbels" in the name of his art brothers. On that occasion, he wished for Flanders "a leader with the genius of an Adolf Hitler (...) so that the Flemish-national socialist order may come here too". He also attended the German culture days in Cologne in May 1941, along with August Borms and Rob van Roosbroeck. Whereas in earlier letters he signed 'Heil Dinaso', from September 1941 he ended his letters with 'Heil Hitler'. He further participated in the Flemish-German culture days. He received favourable press releases and was able to participate in group exhibitions in Germany. He also made some clear pro-German statements and linked his art to the cultural propaganda of the New Order.

=== Final years ===
At the end of 1944, he fled with his daughter via Holland, Germany and Austria to Switzerland where they arrived shortly before the end of the war. Here they were initially interned in a former bleachery in Bühler. He created some murals in the improvised chapel in the internment camp. He was released from the internment centre by the end of 1945.

Fellow artists Constant Permeke and Evarist De Buck accused him of turning in people to the Germans. In July 1947, a Belgian court sentenced him in absentia to 10 years of prison. The sentence was reduced to five years in 1961 and suspended in 1964. The first postwar Servaes exhibition to be held in his home country in Bruges caused a stir as Evarist De Buck and some resistance groups protested vehemently against it by reason of the role he had played in the collaboration with the Germans.

Servaes became a naturalised citizen of Switzerland. He remained a resident of Lucern in Switzerland for the rest of his life.

== Work ==
Common themes of Servaes' paintings were landscapes, agricultural scenes, and subjects from the Bible. Servaes innovative work helped found Flemish Expressionism. He experimented with different ways to show his personal emotions through his paintings. His pioneering expressionist style used several techniques. The first was a blurring of perspective that was first found in Impressionism. Servaes combined this technique with a use of earth colors to create a gloomy tone in many of his works. An example of this is his 1912 landscape Field of Stubble. Servaes used rough brushstrokes, in simple areas of thickly applied dark earth colours, to create a synthetic image of a banal field of stubble at the edge of a wood. This direct and impulsive way of painting was a major impulse for Constant Permeke to evolve towards Expressionism.

== Roman Catholic Church Controversy ==
Servaes' 1919 Stations of the Cross of Luithagen was a collection of 14 charcoal drawings depicting religious figures, such as an emaciated Jesus Christ on the cross. These drawings depicted religious scenes in a raw and brutal expressionist style. The Catholic Church disapproved of this manner of depicting these scenes and as a result many of his works were removed from Belgian churches in 1921. In an effort to support and explore Servaes' spiritual vision, Dutch Carmelite friar Titus Brandsma had the images published in Opgang, a Catholic cultural magazine. Alongside each image, Brandsma added his own meditation. The controversy demonstrates how expressionist art was misunderstood at the time as the work was seen as distorting nature so as to lead away from beauty.

The fallout of the controversy left Servaes at a crossroads in his painting career. He focused on landscape paintings after the controversy and before World War II began. However, Servaes did not give up his grim exclusively-charcoal technique permanently. When he lived with the monks at Orval Abbey starting in 1927, he drew the residents there using his charcoal-expressionist style. By 1935, the public was more accepting of new art styles, and the monks commissioned Servaes to create a new series of the Stations of the Cross.
