= Robert Aerens =

Belgian painter

- Born: Robert Aerens ca. 1883; Ghent, Belgium
- Died: ca. 1969 n/a
- Education: Academy of Fine Arts in Ghent
- Occupations: Painter and etcher
- Spouse: Éliza Verwest

Robert Aerens (1883, Ghent – 1969) was a Belgian painter of landscapes, portraits, and an etcher.

== Biography ==
Robert Aerens was born in 1883 in Ghent.

After taking Jean Delvin's lessons at the Academy of Fine Arts in Ghent, he moved to Laethem with Frits van den Berghe. He married the writer Éliza Verwest in 1910.

He made many trips to France, Italy and Switzerland, before he became a professor at the Academy of Fine Arts in Ghent.

He worked at the front during World War I and exhibited in Paris in 1916 at the Salon des Armées.

He took part in the Salon 1933 in Ghent with "Jaarmarkt te Vézelay" and "Interior. Before the buffet". In the Salon 1937 in Ghent, he showed "De keuken", "Portret", and "Het atelier".
