= Hippolyte Daeye =

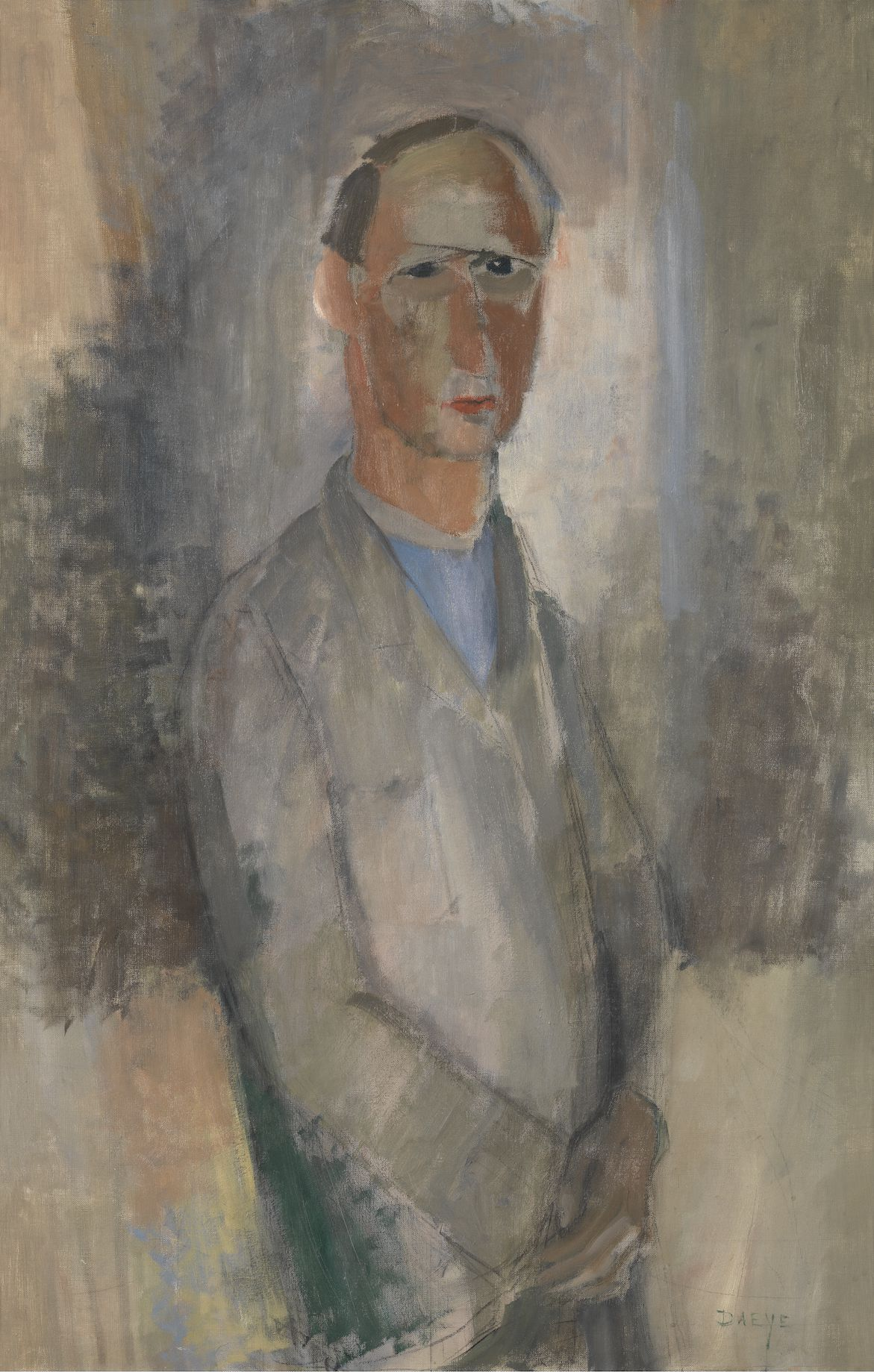
- Selfportrait (1930), oil on canvas, Groeningemuseum.
- Born: 16 March 1873; Ghent, Belgium
- Died: 18 September 1952 (aged 79); Antwerp, Belgium
- Education: Higher Institute for Fine Arts, Academy of Ghent
- Occupation: Painter

Hippolyte Adhemar Daeye (born 16 March 1873 - 18 September 1952) was an expressionist Belgian painter. He studied at the Academy of Ghent and the Higher Institute for Fine Arts in Antwerp, receiving education on both classical and modern painting.

== Painting career ==
Describing detailed landscapes of Flanders, his early works were heavily influenced by realism. Later on, he started to experiment with colors and light, reflecting an influence of impressionism. During the World War I, he stayed in England and kept in contact with his artists friends such as Gustave van de Woestijne and Edgar Tytgat. Also having influenced by the European modernist art movements, in time, his free techniques oriented towards expressionism.

The distinguishing mark of his work is the way he painted the human portraits and figures. The manifestation of human characteristics and emotions on canvas made his works recognised and timeless.

== Gallery ==
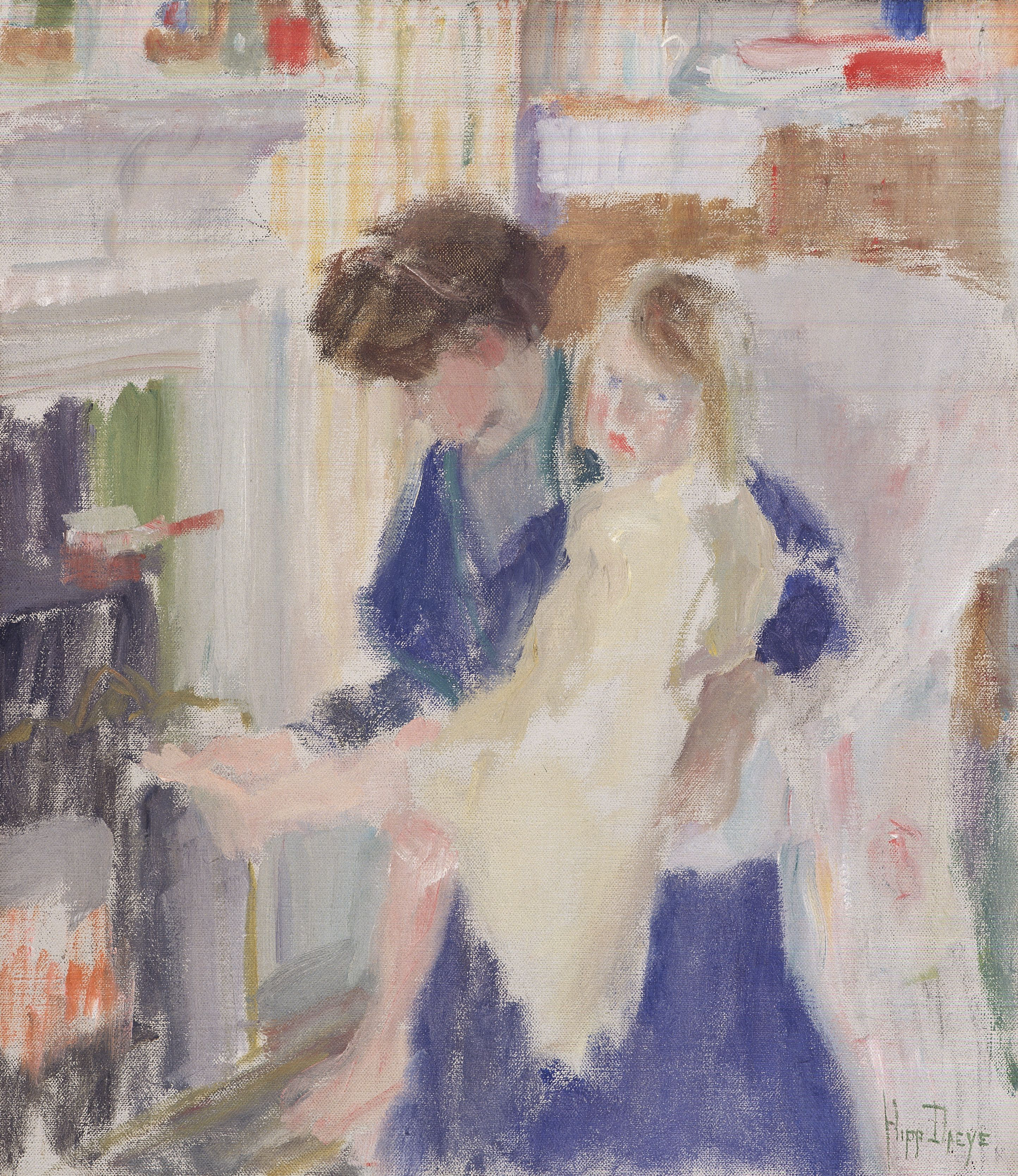
Mother and Child in Front of the Hearth at Sanderstead Museum of Fine Arts, Ghent

Nude with crossed arms Royal Museum of Fine Arts, Antwerp

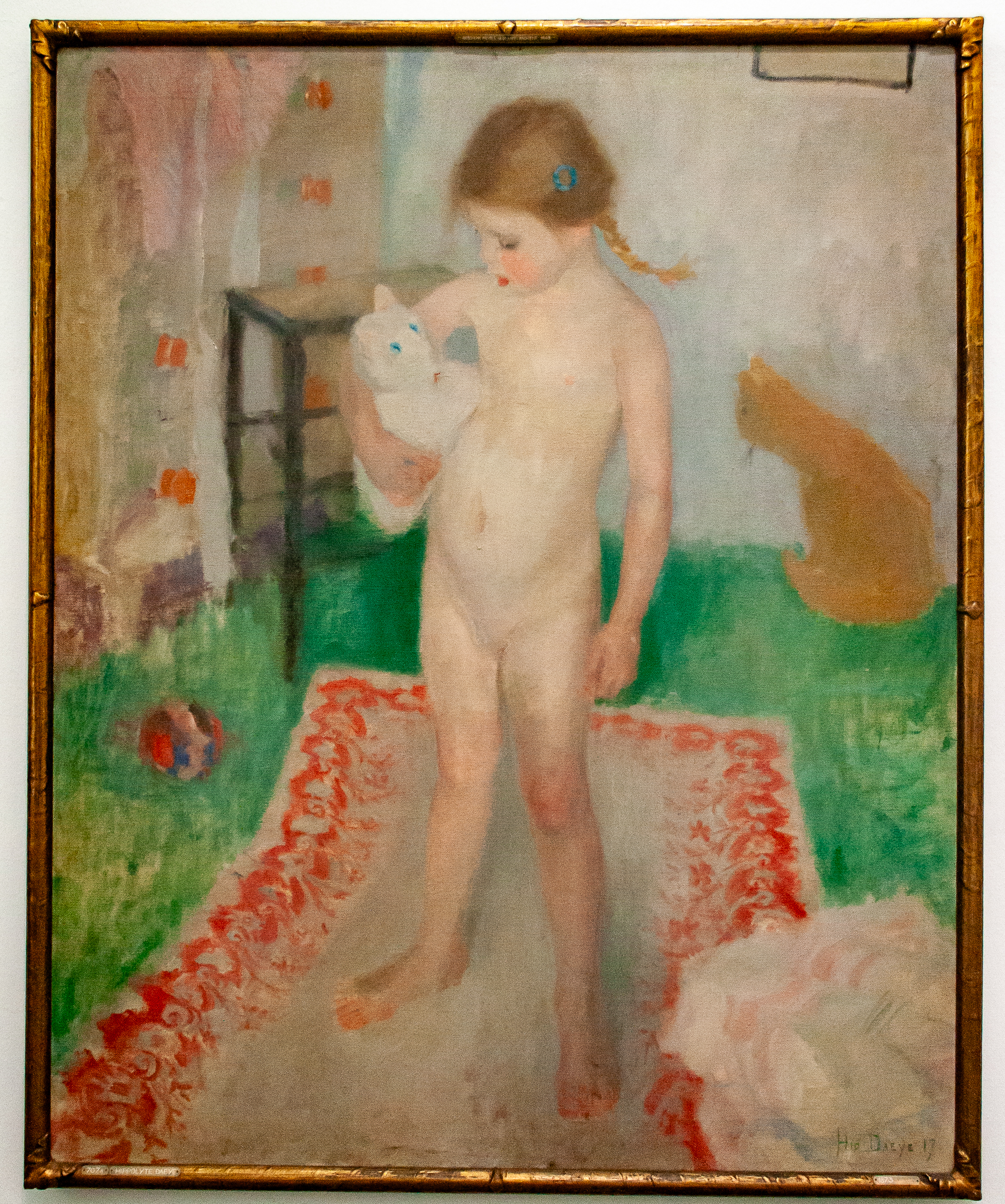
Portrait of the artist's daughter Museum Boijmans Van Beuningen
