= Frits Van den Berghe =

Belgian painter and illustrator (1883–1939)

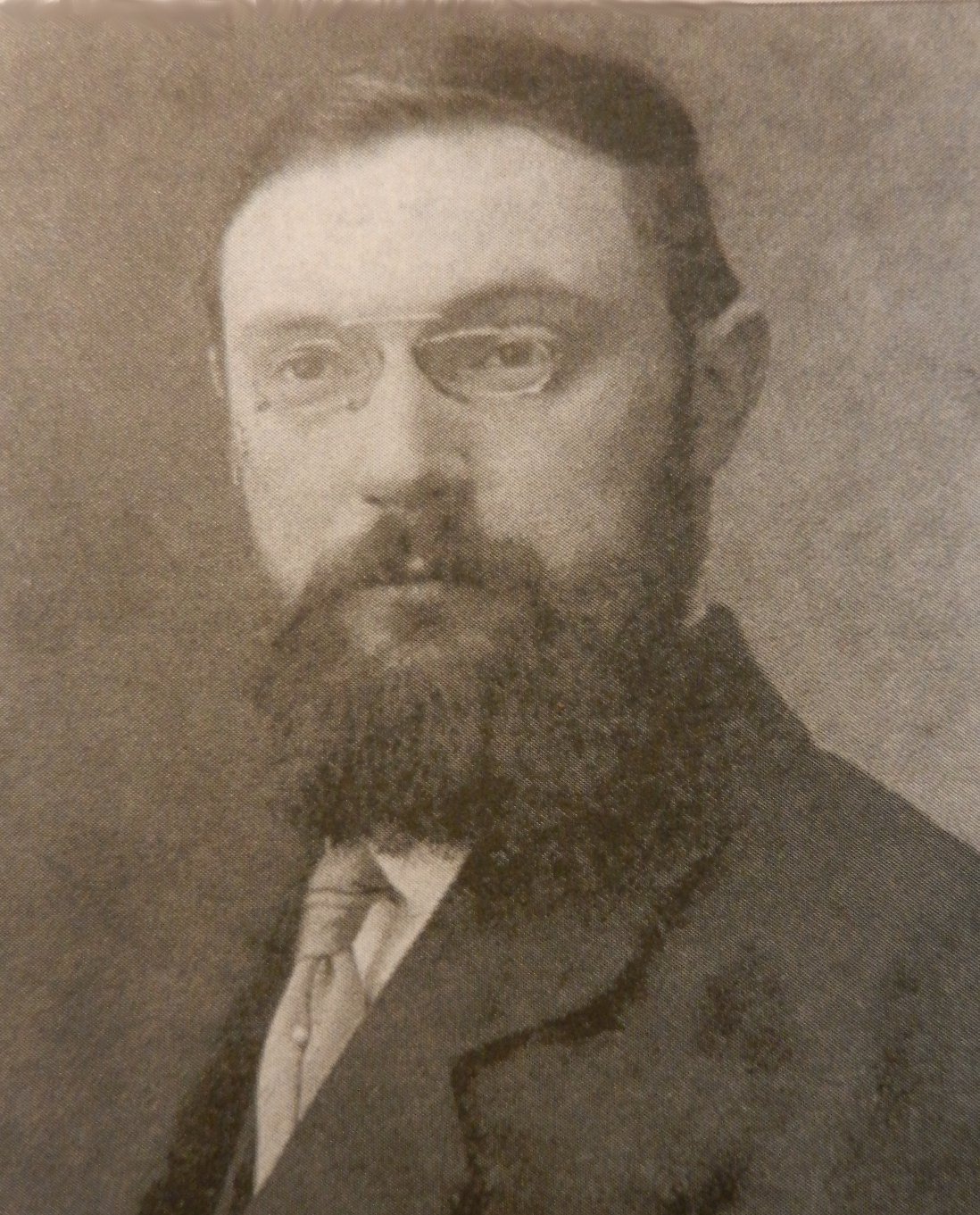
- Van den Berghe in 1915
- Born: 3 April 1883; Ghent, Belgium
- Died: 23 December 1939 (aged 56); Ghent, Belgium
- Education: Ghent Royal Academy of Fine Arts
- Years active: 1904–1939
- Movement: Expressionism

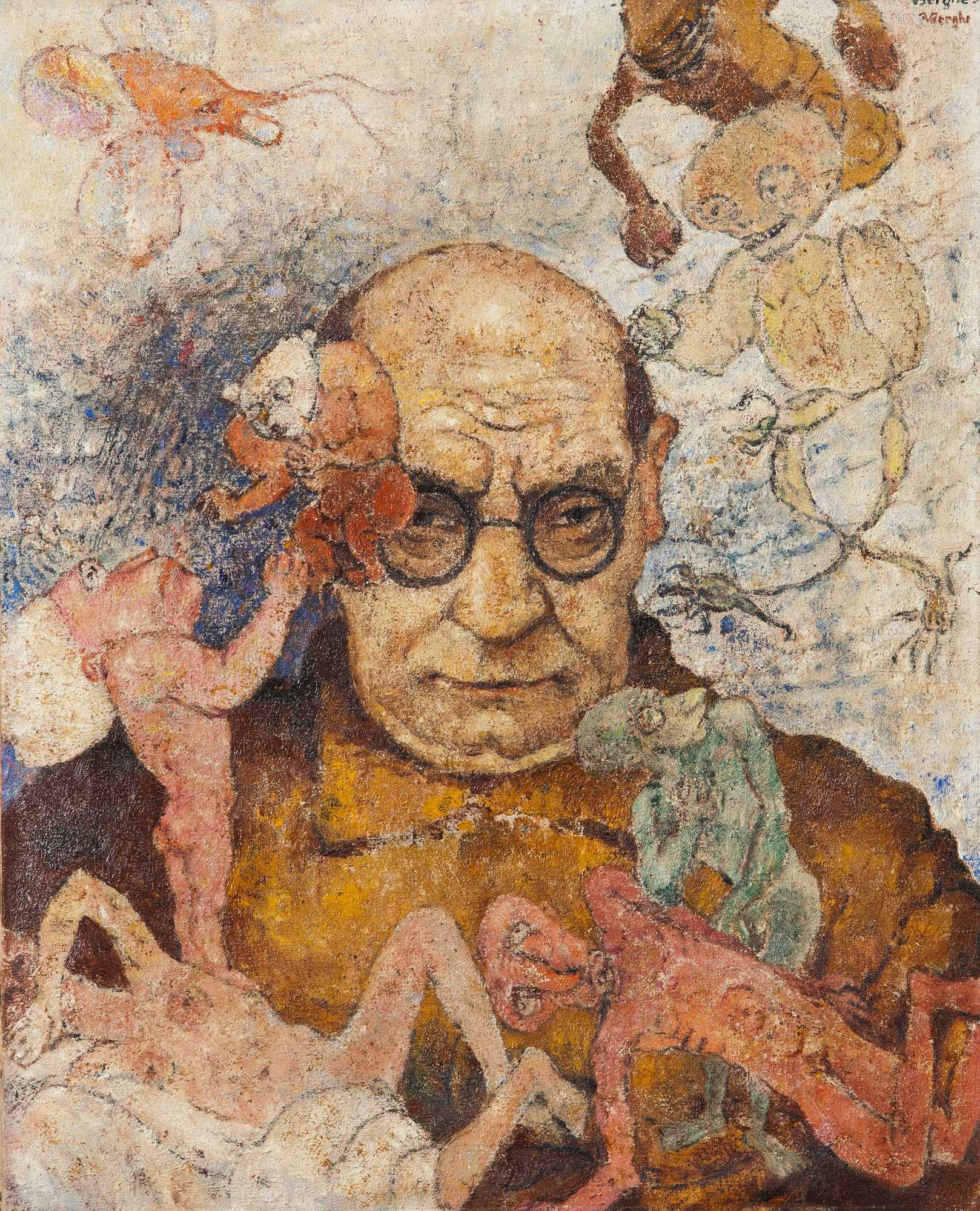
Self-portrait (c.1933)

Frits Van den Berghe (3 April 1883 – 23 September 1939) was a Belgian expressionist and surrealist painter and illustrator.

== Biography ==
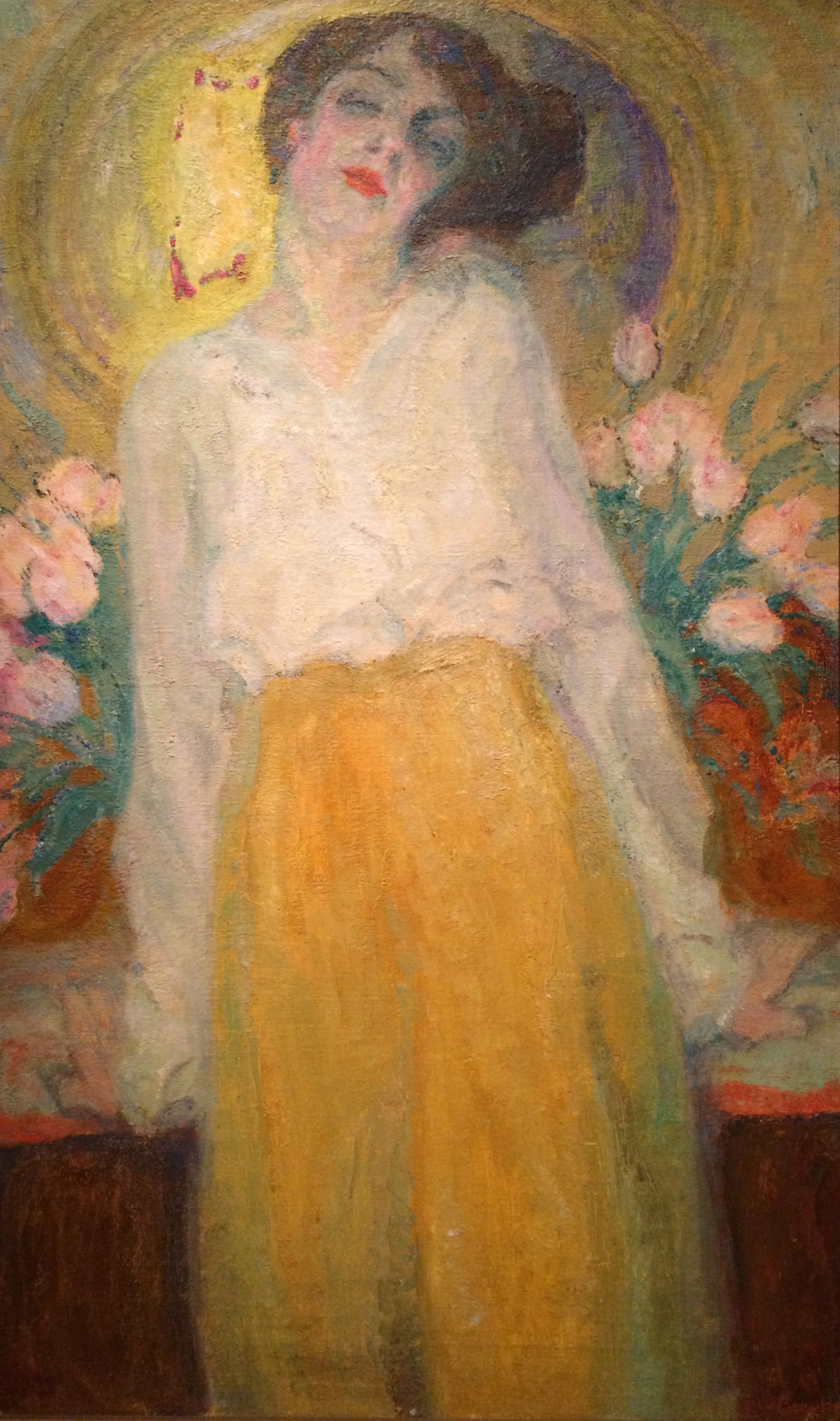
Portrait of Stella van de Wiele (1915)

He was born in Ghent, where his father was the Librarian at the University of Ghent. From 1898 to 1904, he studied at the Royal Academy of Fine Arts under Jean Delvin. In 1904, on the recommendation of his fellow painter, Alfons Dessenis (1874–1952), he went to stay at the art colony in Sint-Martens-Latem. It was there he met Albert Servaes, Gustave De Smet and Constant Permeke. Together, they established what came to be known as the Latem School of expressionist painting. He also obtained what would prove to be the lifelong support of the journalist and art promoter, Paul-Gustave van Hecke.

In 1907 he was married and, shortly after, became a professor at the Ghent Academy. A few years later, his family life and artistic career were disturbed by a relationship with the actress Stella van de Wiele (1887–1954). In 1914, he gave up his position and spent six months in the United States.

During World War I, Van den Berghe became a refugee in the Netherlands. He, Stella and De Smet toured the art colonies in Amsterdam, Blaricum and Laren, where he briefly taught. His work also matured and came under the influence of Freudian psychoanalysis. In 1922, after returning to Belgium, he lived with De Smet and Permeke in Ostend. After that, he and De Smet moved about western Flanders, seeking inspiration, and finally settled in Afsnee at a villa supplied by Van Hecke.

Van den Berghe later spent some time in Brussels, but the Great Depression virtually eliminated the market for any sort of modern art, so he returned to Ghent and became an illustrator for the Socialist newspaper, Vooruit (Forward). He worked for them until his death. From 1937 to 1938, he drew the panels for a comic strip written by Jean Ray. During his later years, he painted in a surrealistic style, replete with dream visions and hallucinations. He died in Ghent on 23 September 1939.

Major retrospectives were held in 1962 (Brussels) and 1984 (Utrecht). On the sixtieth anniversary of his death, in 1999, a large exhibition was held in Ostend with, for the first time, his illustrations. His painting, "Zondag" (Sunday), was included in the German series 1000 Meisterwerke and featured on a Belgian postage stamp in 2001.

== Selected paintings ==
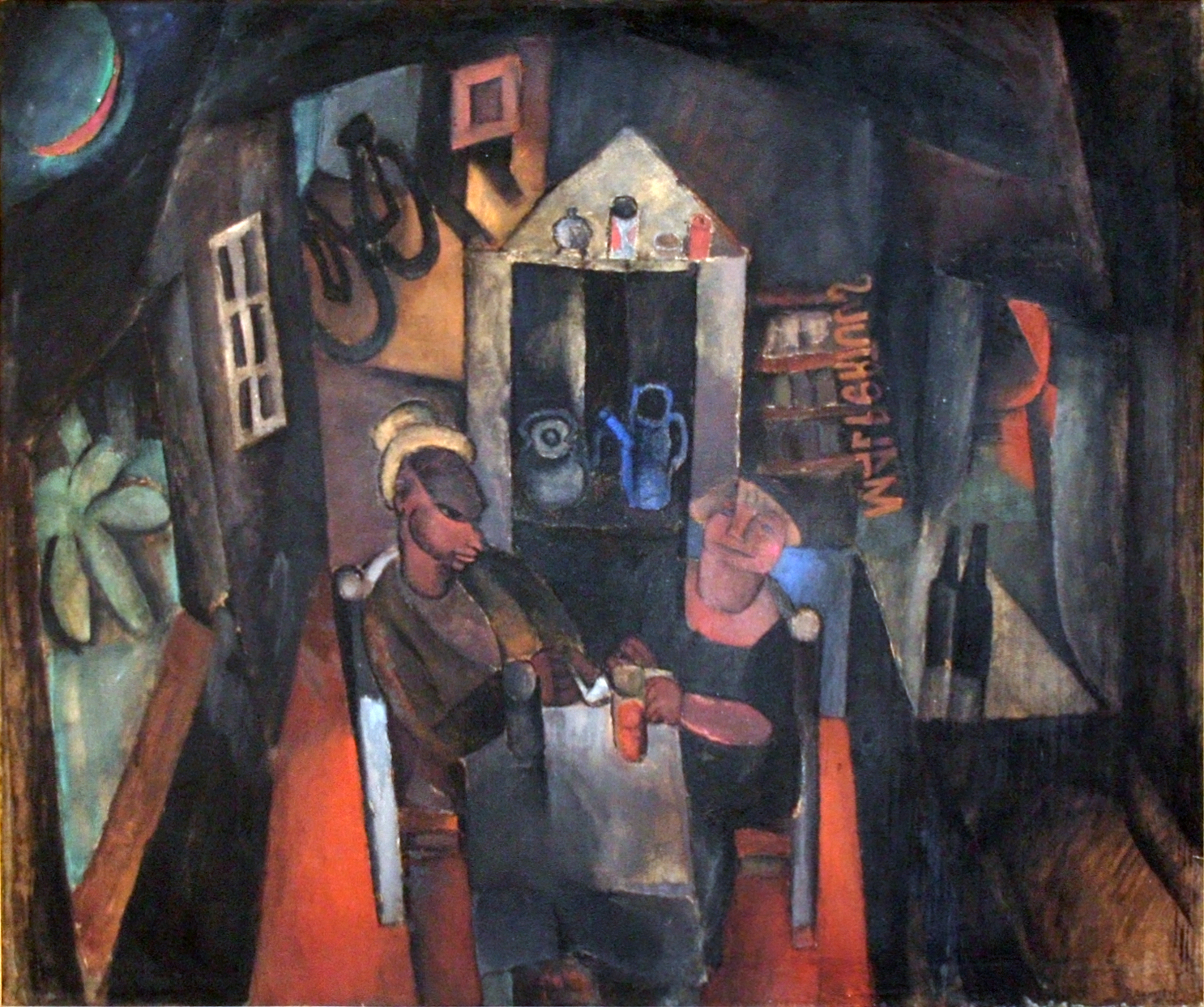
Maleperduis
(his home in Blaricum)

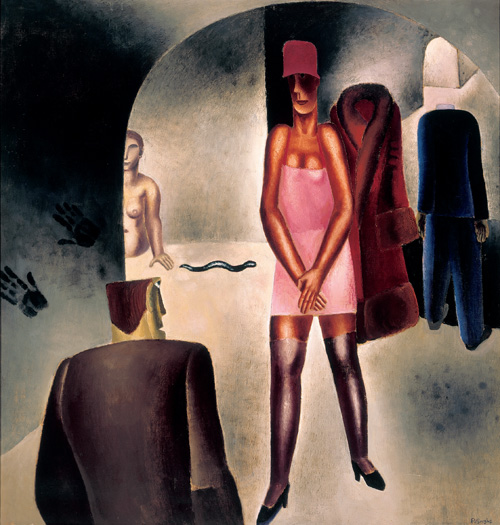
Corridors

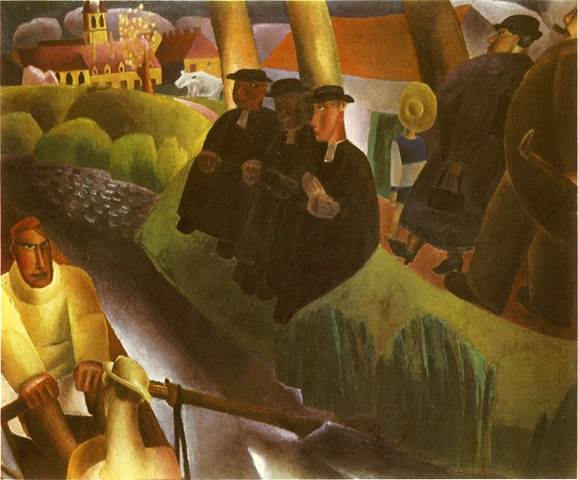
Sunday

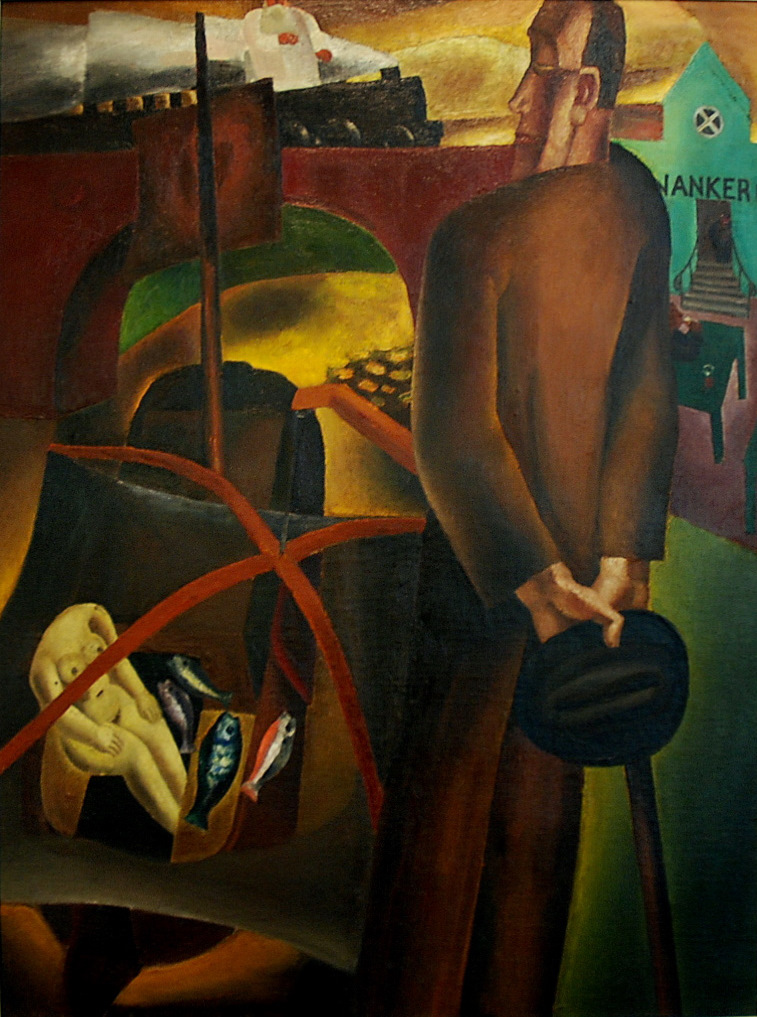
Eternal Wanderer (Vagabond)

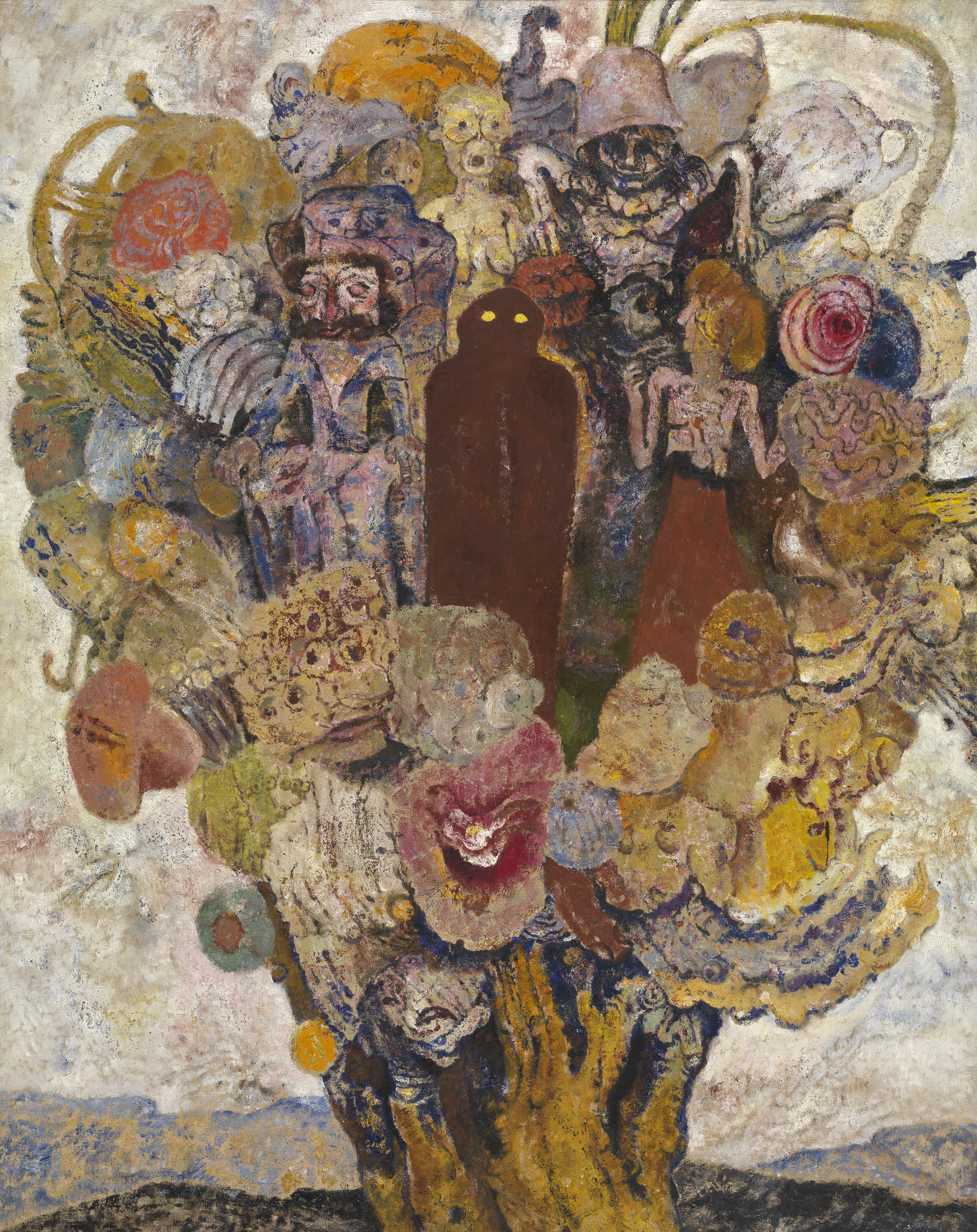
Tree in Bloom, Frits Van den Berghe, (1930), Royal Museum of Fine Arts Antwerp

== See also ==
Robert Aerens
