= Gustave De Smet =

Belgian painter (1877–1943)

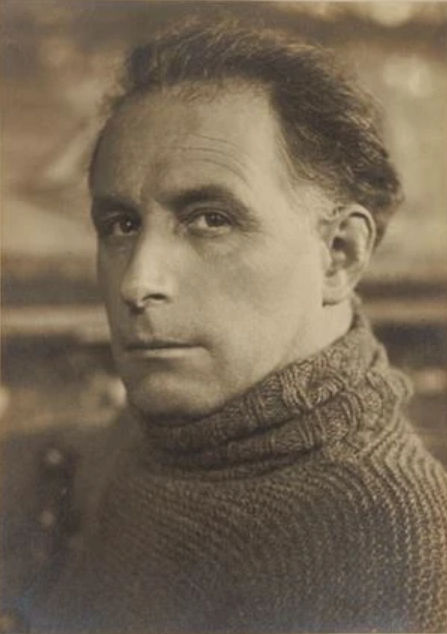
Gustave De Smet (c.1920)

Gustave Franciscus De Smet, also known as Gustaaf De Smet and Gust De Smet (21 January 1877 – 8 October 1943) was a Belgian painter and printmaker. Together with Constant Permeke and Frits Van den Berghe, he was one of the founders of Flemish Expressionism. Some of the works of the Flemish expressionists bear a stylistic relationship to German expressionism through their use of distorted forms, coloration and dynamic compositions while others show cubist elements in their sense of balance, synthesis and construction. Before World War I, these artists were part of the second group of the Latem School, a loose group of artists working at various times in the rural Lys river area around Sint-Martens-Latem, south of Ghent. They aimed to innovate Belgian art by turning away from bourgeois art and drawing inspiration from nature or the live of workers and farmers. Key members of the group fled Belgium at the start of World War I to countries where they were exposed to the latest Modernist art trends. De Smet fled to the Netherlands, where his development of an expressionist idiom was influenced by the Bergen School, the first expressionist art movement in the Netherlands, as well as the German expressionists.

== Biography ==
He was born in Ghent. His father, Jules, was a decorative painter and photographer. Gustave attended the Royal Academy of Fine Arts in Ghent from 1889 to 1896. One of his teachers there was Jean Delvin, a painter of scenes with animals, in particular horses and a member of various Belgian avant-garde artist groups. According to his own statement, De Smet only attended the Academy for a short time as he preferred to work in nature without a teacher. Both Gustave and his four years younger brother Léon De Smet assisted their father with the decoration of inns, stores and fairground buildings. In the 1890s, Gustave was, in particular, involved in the decoration of the exterior of the Spitzner Museum, a famous fairground attraction of the time.

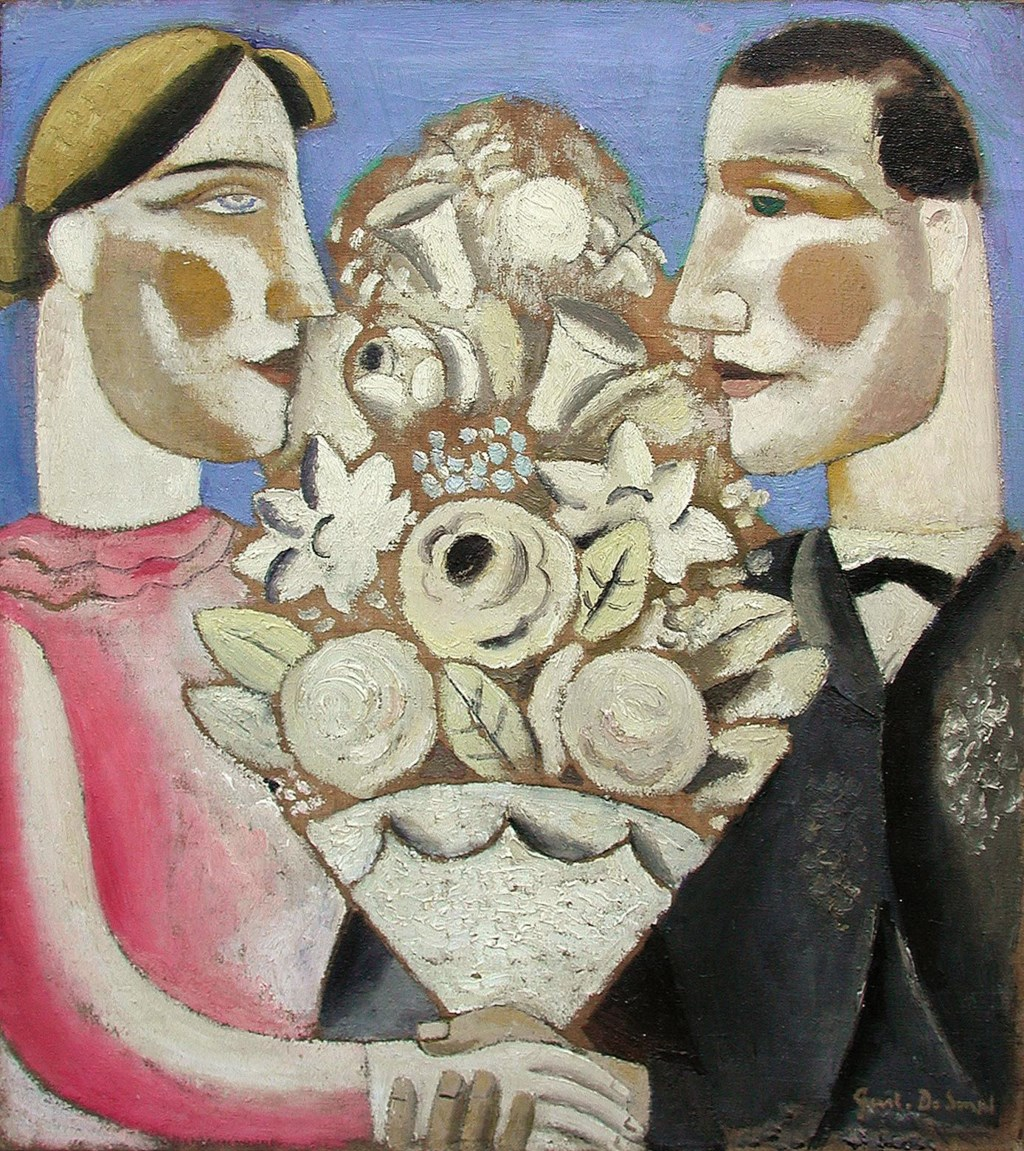
The Bouquet (1924)

He married Augusta van Hoorebeke, a cotton worker, on 19 February 1898. He paid for his wedding banquet at Estaminet Nenuphar by making large paintings for its interior decoration (still in situ). The couple's only child Firmin died on 13 September 1918 at the age of 20 as one of the 41 victims of the infamous train disaster near Weesp in the Netherlands, the country to which they had fled during the First World War. Around 1906, he became friends with Frits Van den Berghe and Constant Permeke in the Ghent working class district of Patershol. These friendships lasted for the rest of his life. In early 1906 he worked with Permeke in the harbour area of Ostend. In early July 1908, he and his wife and child joined his brother Léon at the artists' colony in Sint-Martens-Latem. There, he initially came under the influence of Luminism and the painter Emile Claus, who lived in nearby Astene. From 1911 he once again lived in Ghent.

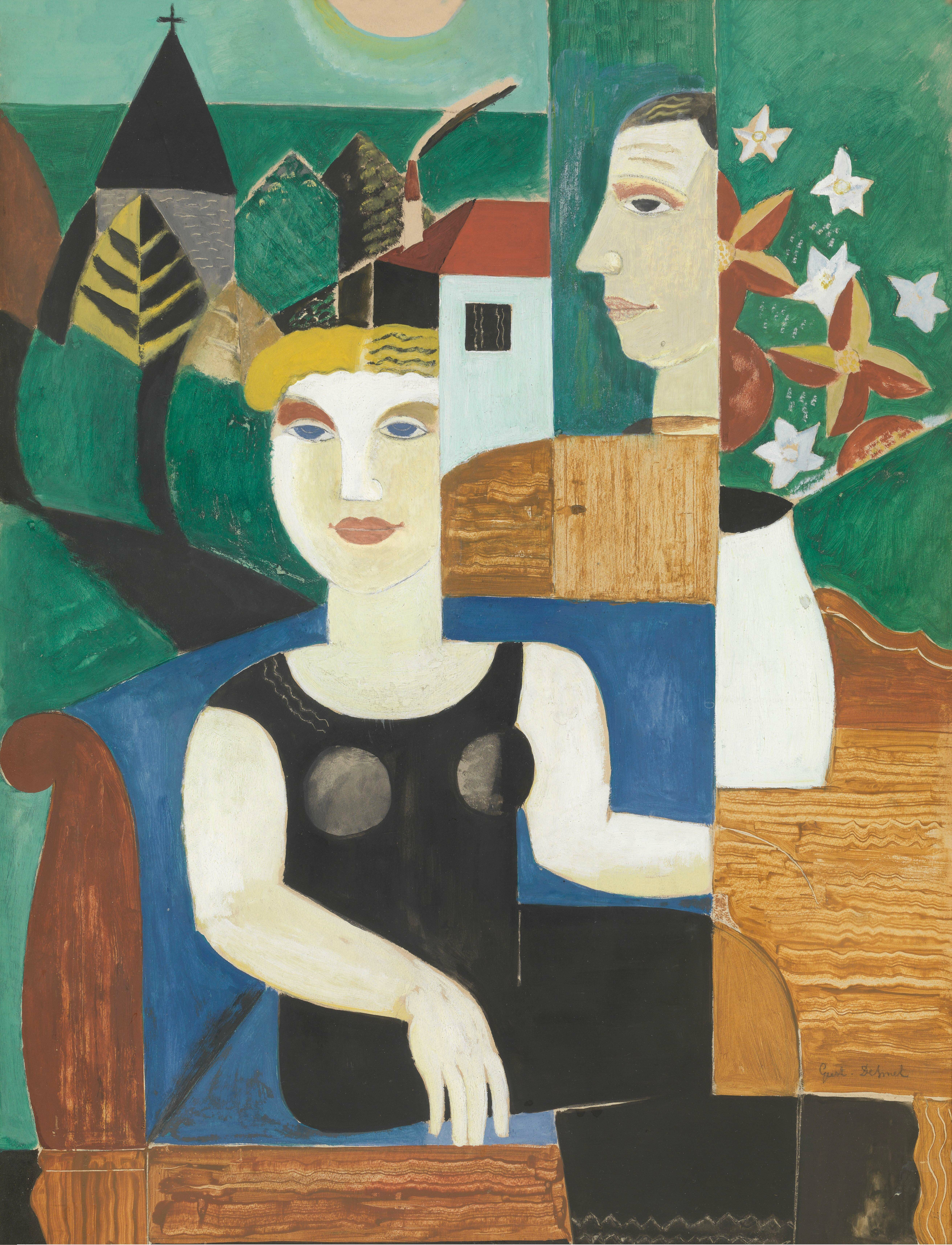
The Artist and His Wife(1927), Museum of Fine Arts, Ghent

At the outbreak of World War I, he and his family joined his friend, Frits Van den Berghe, and fled to the Netherlands. From 1914 to 1922, they moved around, visiting and staying at the art colonies in Amsterdam, Laren and Blaricum. He befriended the Dutch painter Leo Gestel (1881-1941), who introduced him to the Amsterdam art world. De Smet changed his style considerably under the influence of the work of Gestel and the artists of the Bergen School, the first expressionist art movement in the Netherlands. These artists included the French cubist painter Henri Le Fauconnier whose work became a significant influence on De Smet's style. The works of the Bergen School are characterised by figurative depiction with cubist influences, an expressionist touch and a saturated palette. De Smet later stated that through his encounter of the work of some modern artists, he saw that 'the visual imitation of nature stands in terrific opposition to pure expression. During this time he was further influenced by German expressionism which encouraged him to focus on personal feelings and new expressive ways of depicting them by using chiaroscuro effects and simplified lines and shapes. His work started to place greater emphasis on a well-organized and balanced structure which augmented the expressive quality of his art. His color palette changed to warm autumnal tones and blacks applied in broad brushstrokes leading to solid masses of paint on the canvas.

He returned to Belgium in 1922, where he continued to move frequently, usually in the company of his friends Van den Berghe and Permeke, beginning in Ostend, then to Bachte-Maria-Leerne and Afsnee. In Afsnee he lived in a villa called 'Villa Malpertuis' which was made available by the art promoter and journalist, Paul-Gustave van Hecke. The house was also a regular meeting place for a variety of artists. In 1927, he finally settled in Deurle. In 1929-1930, he had a villa built on the Pontstraat in Deurle. It was there that his mixture of Expressionism and Cubism peaked, with a series of works depicting circus, fairground and village scenes. The art gallery 'Le Centaure' in Brussels had become one of the principal promoters of Flemish Expressionism in Belgium and abroad. When it went bankrupt in 1932 during a severe economic crisis, the gallery's collection was auctioned off without limit. Not less than 100 of De Smet's works were auctioned for a very low price. The conservative press also used the economic crisis and the bankruptcy of the modernistic galleries to announce the end of Expressionism, the prevailing movement of the 1920s. De Smet had to sell his house in Deurle as a result of the financial difficulties brought on by this crisis.

In 1936, he settled in a simple house in Deurle. After his death in Deurle at the age of sixty-six, his house was preserved as a local museum.

== Selected paintings ==
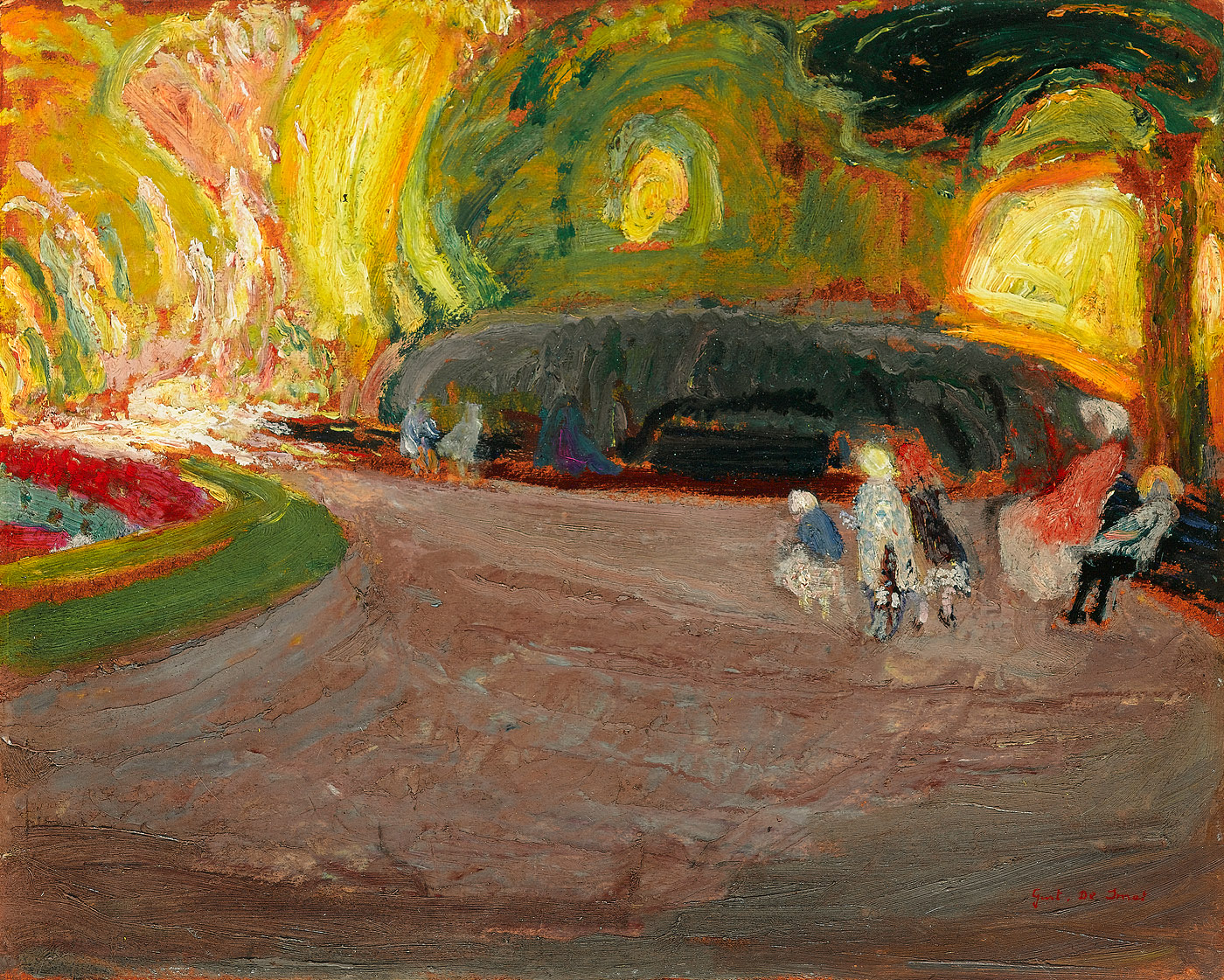
Vondelpark, 1915, Amsterdam Museum

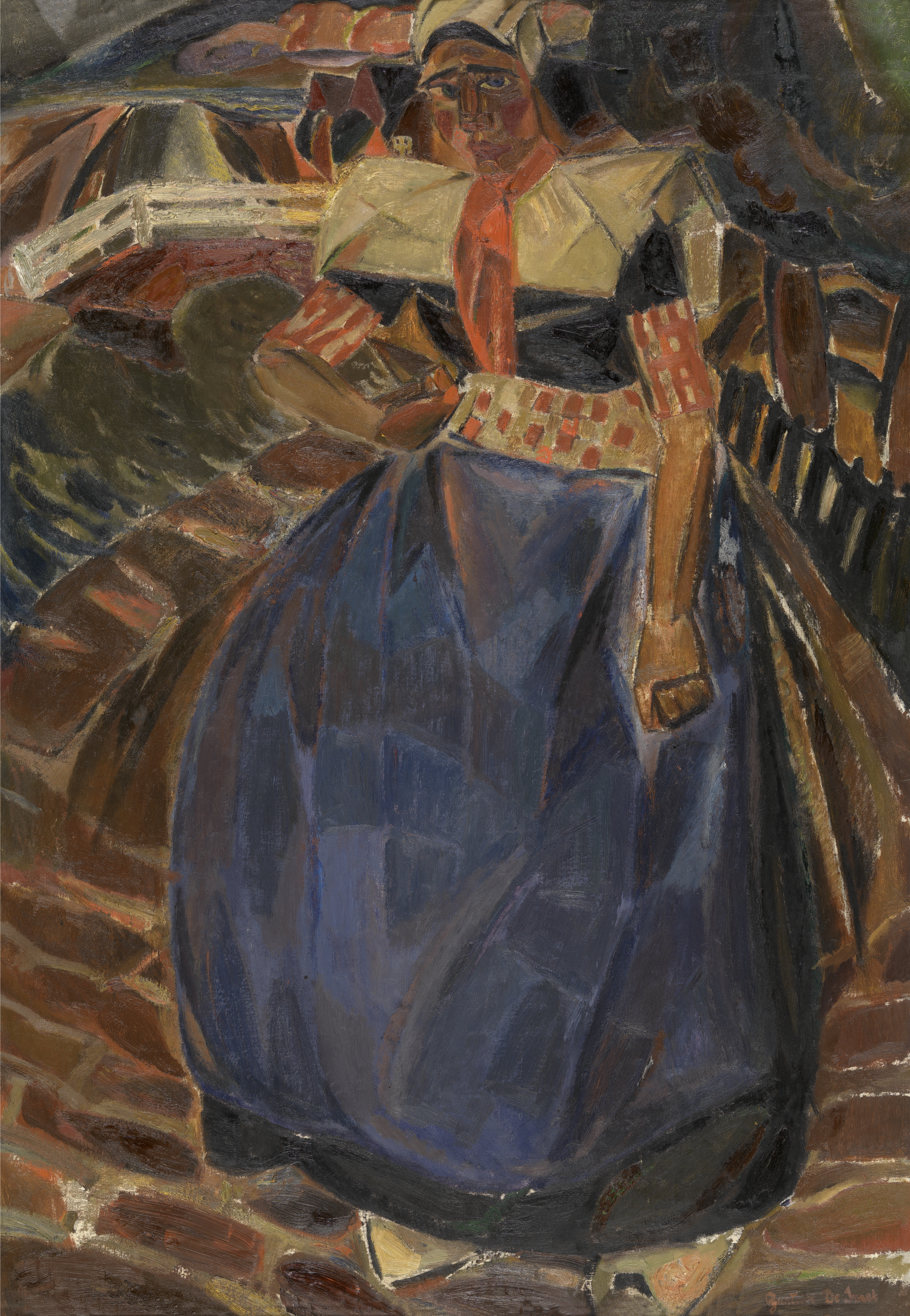
Woman from Spakenburg, 1917, 1923, Royal Museum of Fine Arts Antwerp

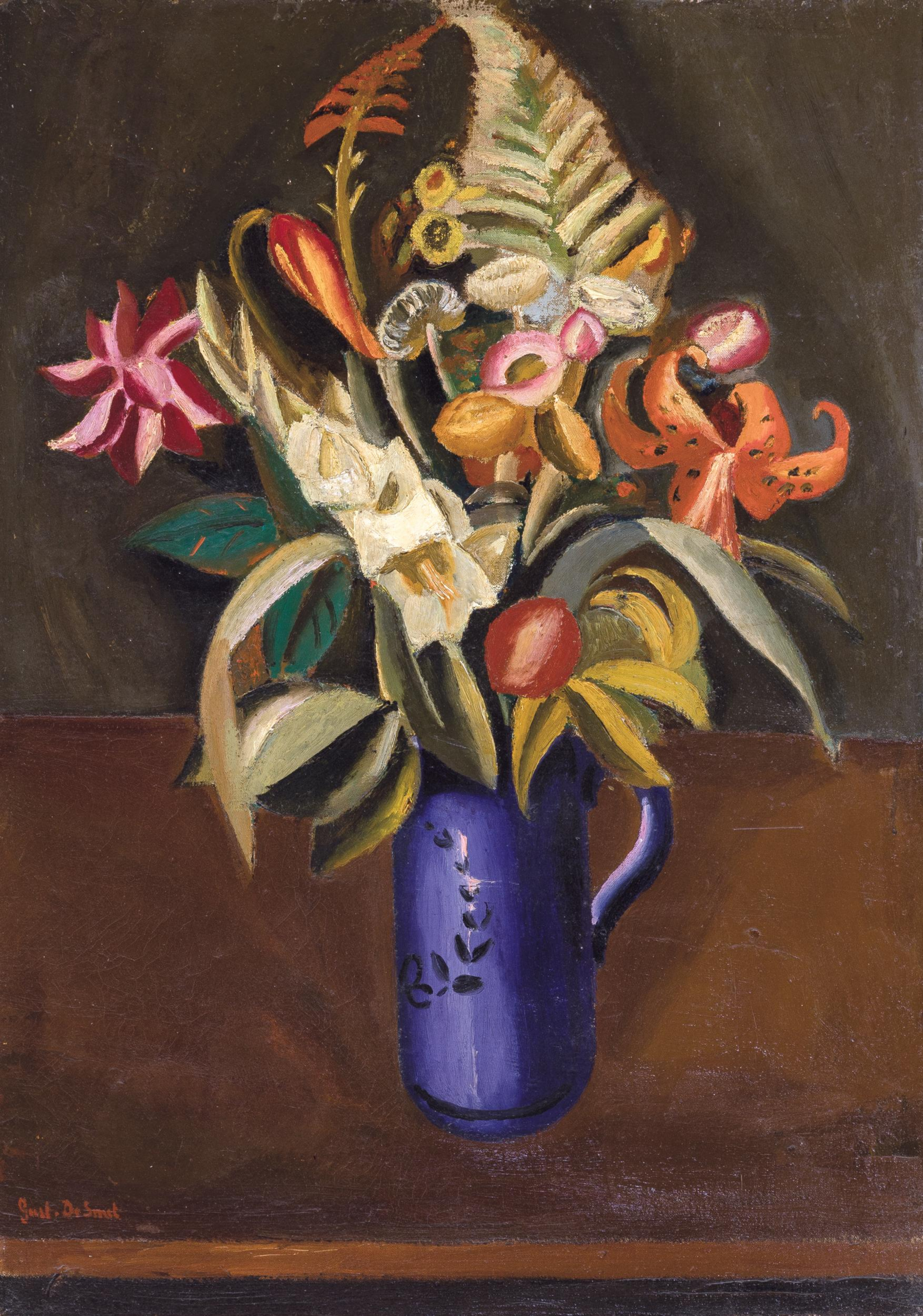
Wild flowers in a blue vase, 1920/25, private collection

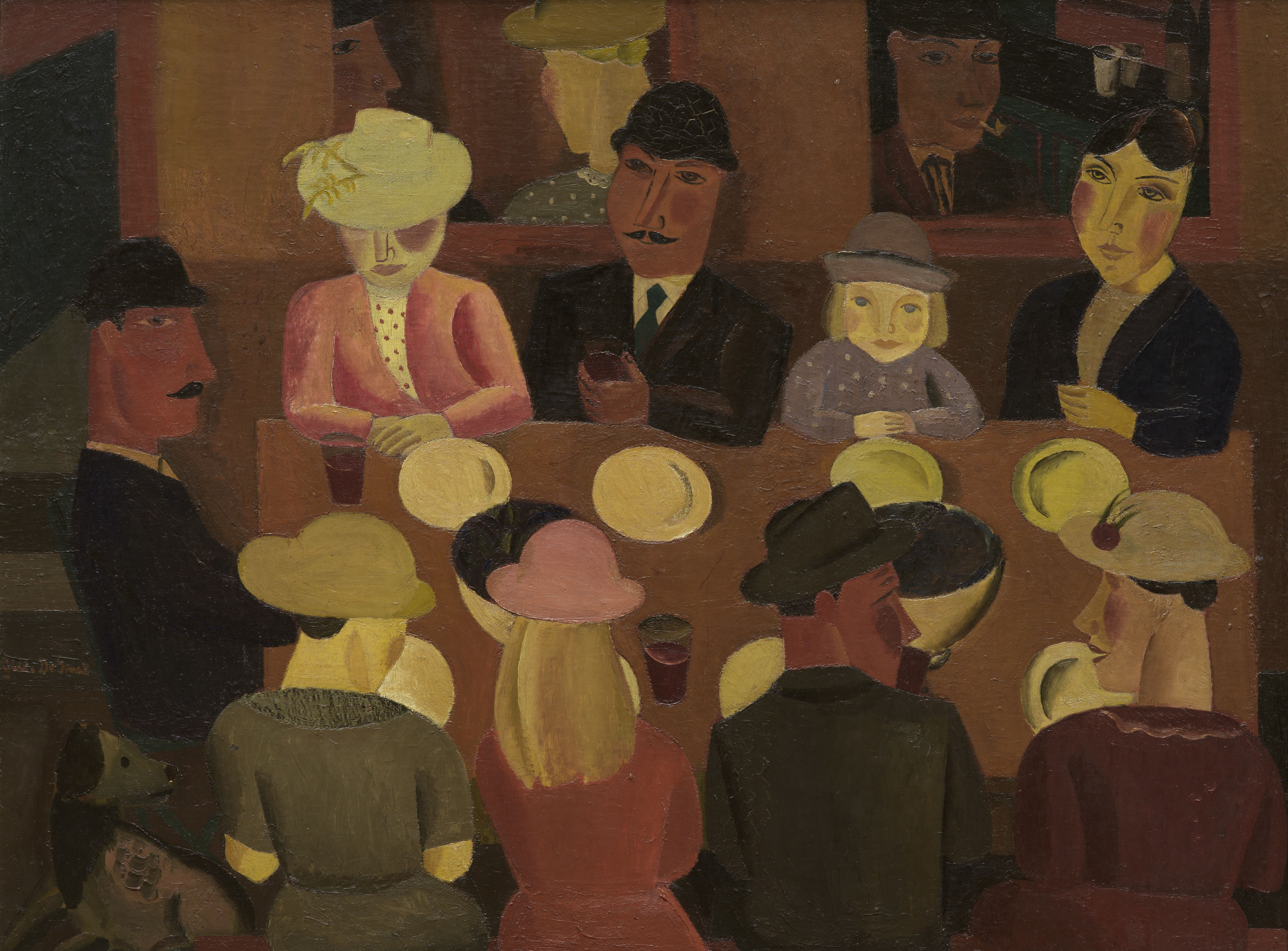
The mussel eaters, 1923, Royal Museum of Fine Arts Antwerp

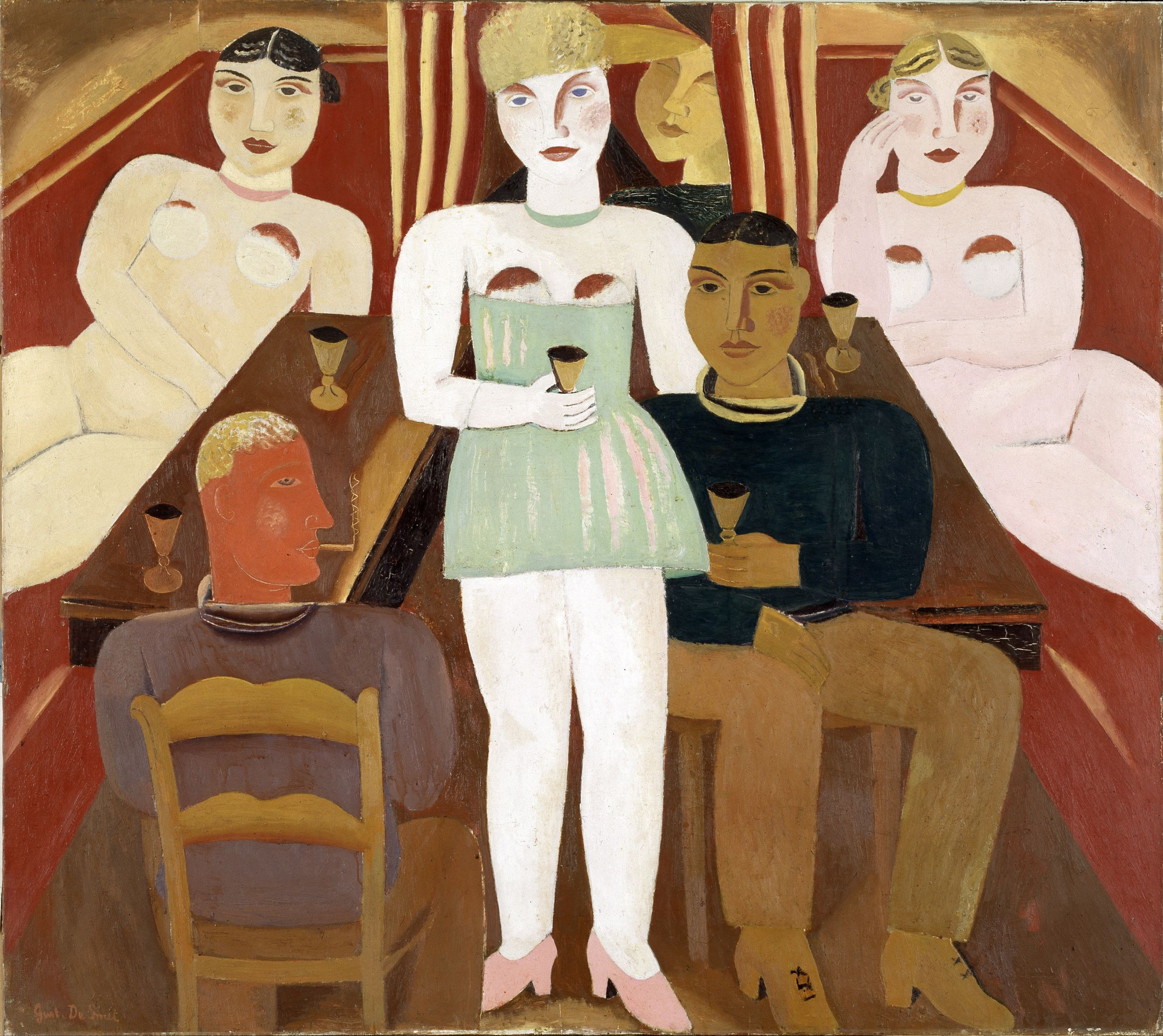
The Good House, 1926, Museum of Fine Arts, Ghent

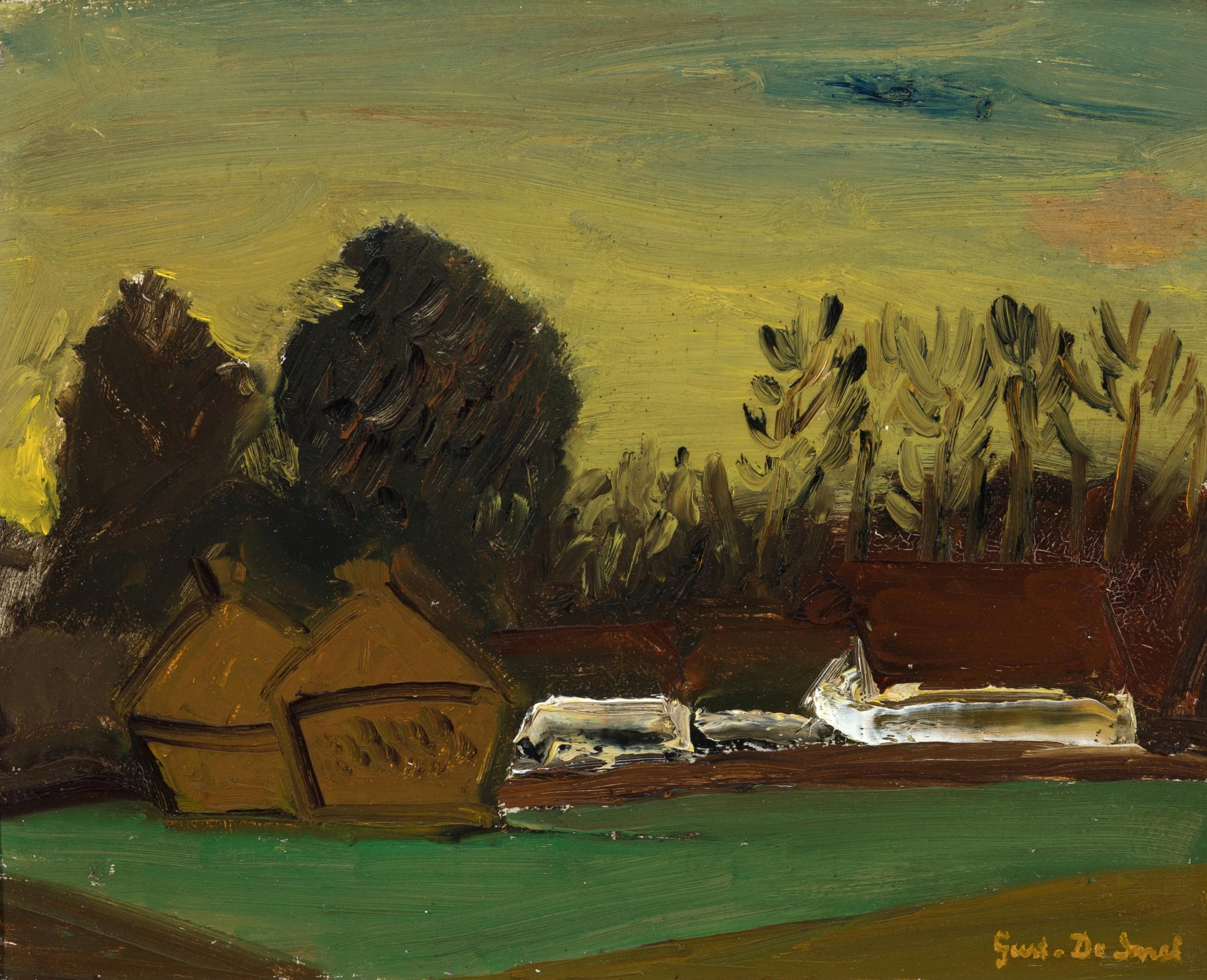
Landscape with haystack, 1936, private collection

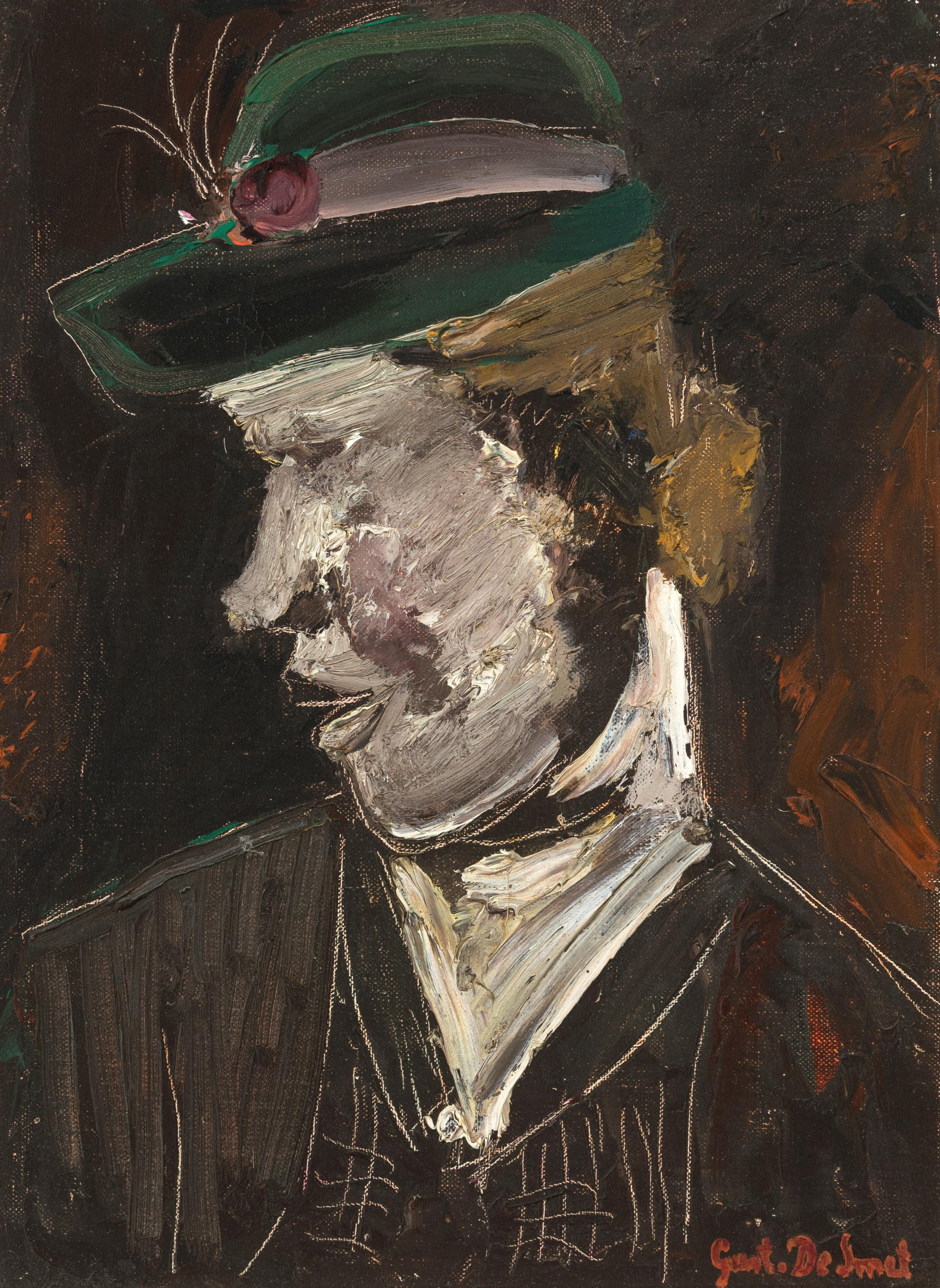
Woman with a green hat, 1937, private collection

== Public collections ==
Among the public collections holding works by Gustave De Smet are:

- Antwerp, Royal Museum of Fine Arts Antwerp
- Brussels, Royal Museums of Fine Arts of Belgium
- The Hague, Kunstmuseum Den Haag
- Deinze, Museum van Deinze en de Leiestreek
- Haarlem, Frans Hals Museum
- Ghent, Museum of Fine Arts
- Ostend, Mu.ZEE
- Venlo, Museum van Bommel van Dam
- Zwolle, Museum De Fundatie
