= Gaston and His Sister =

Painting by Gustave Van de Woestyne

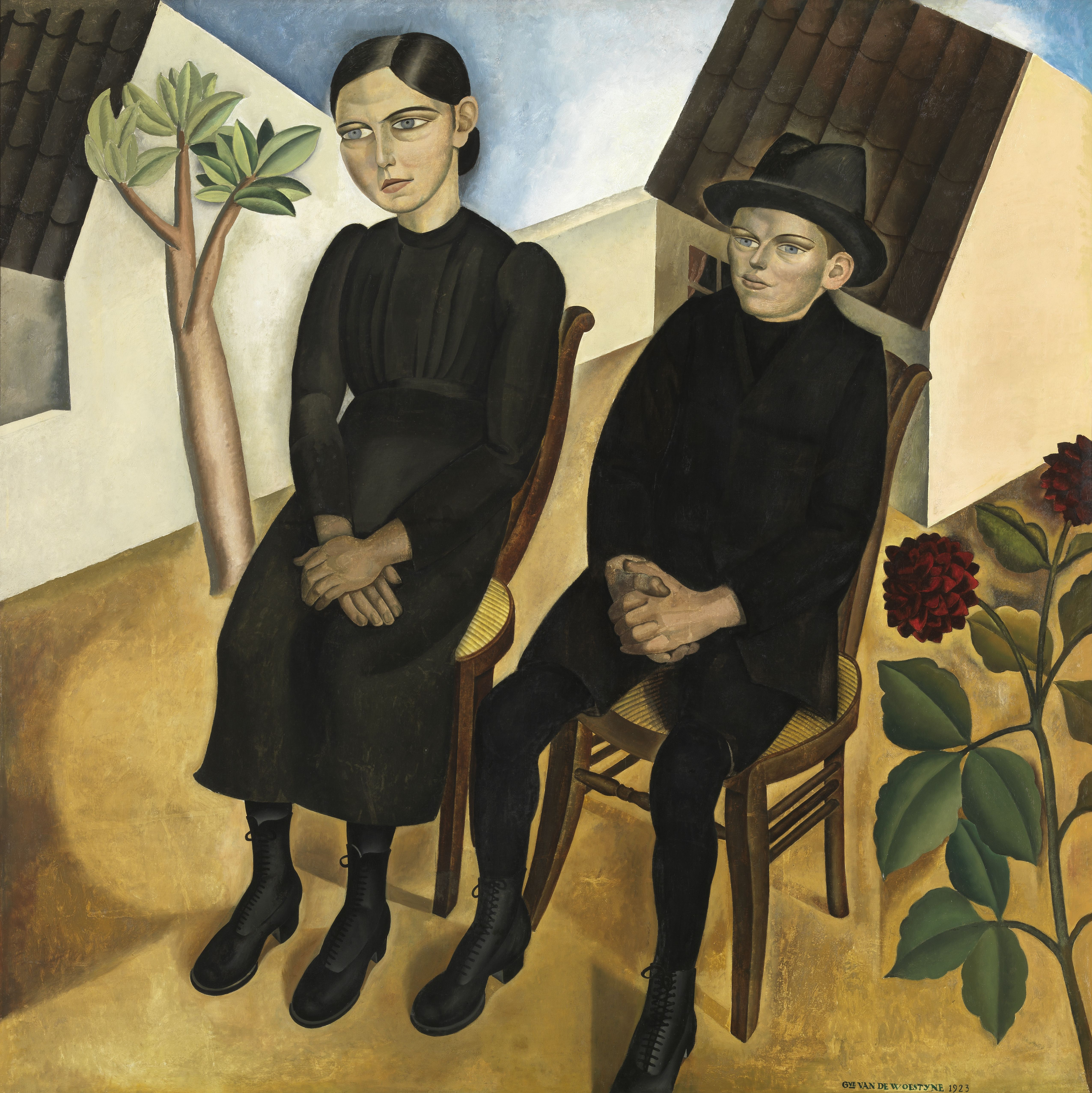
- Artist: Gustave Van de Woestijne
- Year: 1924
- Medium: Oil on canvas painting
- Movement: Expressionism
- Dimensions: 202.5 cm × 202.5 cm (79.7 in × 79.7 in)
- Location: Royal Museum of Fine Arts Antwerp, Antwerp

Gaston and His Sister is a 1923 Expressionist oil on canvas painting by the Flemish artist Gustave Van de Woestijne, now in the Royal Museum of Fine Arts Antwerp.

He produced it during a year's stay in London. It was one of the most important works in the artist's first solo exhibition, which occurred at the 'Le Centaure' gallery in 1925. During the First World War he had become friends with Valerius De Saedeleer and Georges Minne and regularly visited art galleries and museums, whilst after the war he had traveled to Paris to see art exhibitions.
