= Adrienne (painting) =

Painting by Gustave Van de Woestyne

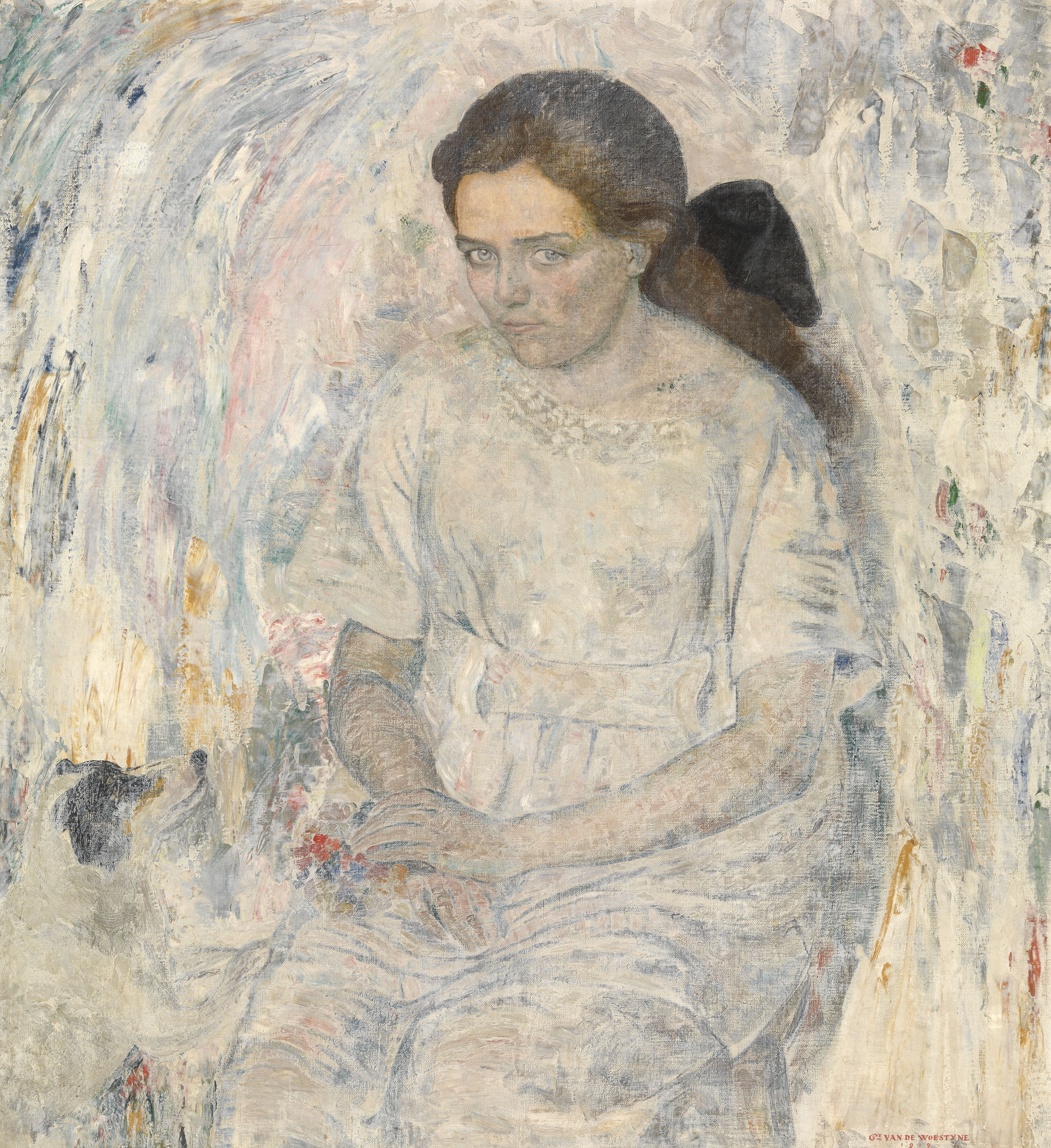
Adrienne (1919) by Gustave Van de Woestyne

Adrienne is a 1919 painting by the Flemish artist Gustave Van de Woestyne, now in the Royal Museum of Fine Arts, Antwerp. Its subjects are Adrienne de Zutter (the de Woestyne family's neighbour after its move to the 'Rozenhuis' in Waregem after the First World War) and her dog. It shows the influence of the English landscape artist William Turner, whose work de Woestyne had probably seen during the war.
