= Azure (painting) =

1928 painting by Gustave Van De Woestyne

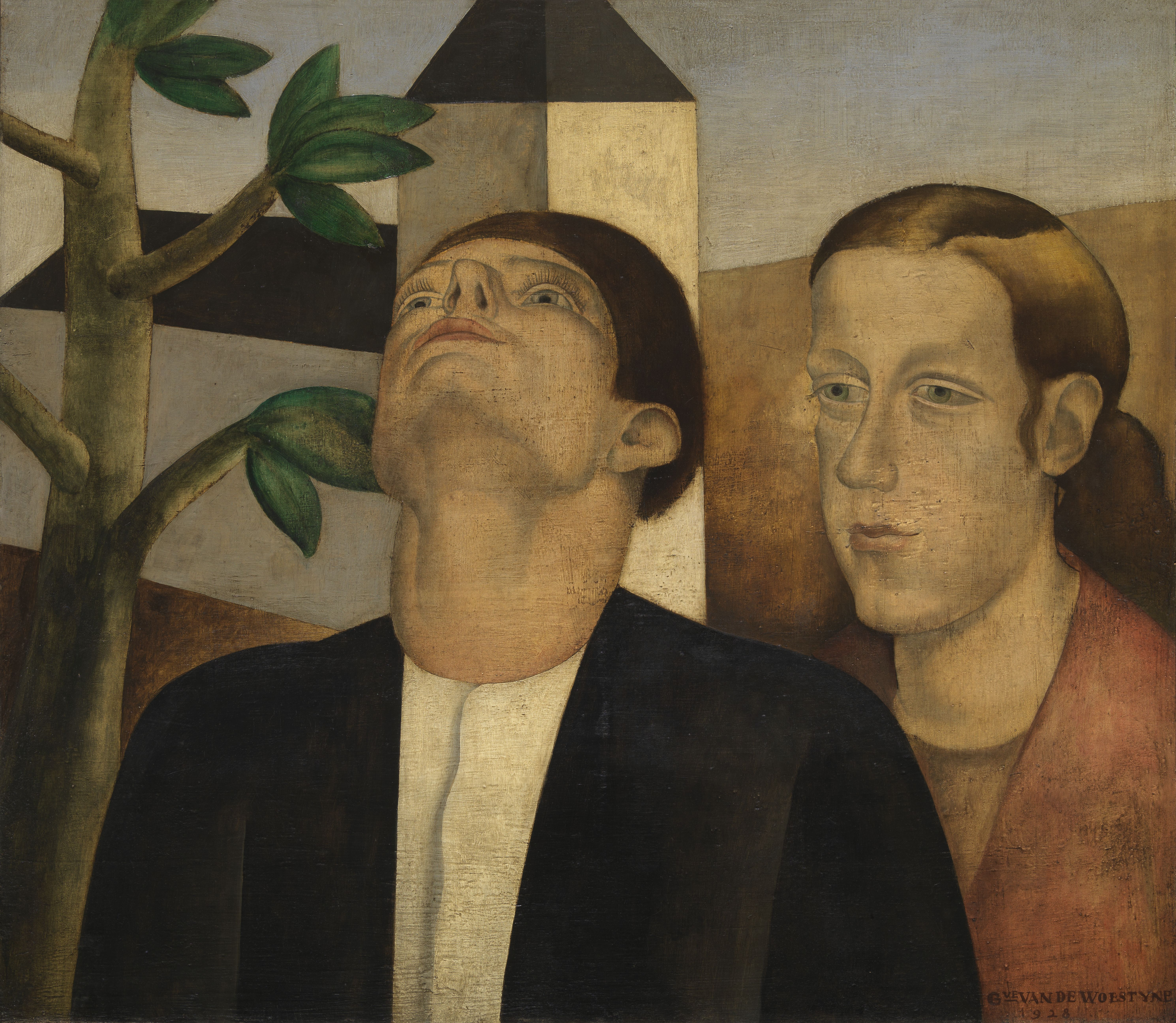
Azure (1928)

Azure is a 1928 painting by the Flemish artist Gustave Van de Woestijne, now in the Royal Museum of Fine Arts Antwerp.
