= Gustave Van de Woestijne =

Belgian painter (1881–1947)

Gustave Van de Woestijne (Dutch: [vɑn də ʋuˈstɛinə]; 2 August 1881 – 21 April 1947) was a Belgian expressionist painter.

He belonged to the so-called "First Group of Latem", a group of artists who worked in the rural village of Sint-Martens-Latem on the banks of the Lys, near Ghent. He was the brother of the Flemish poet Karel Van de Woestijne. He was buried in the Cemetery of Campo Santo.

== Honours ==
- 1919 : Knight of the Order of Leopold.

== Works by him in the Royal Museum of Fine Arts, Antwerp ==
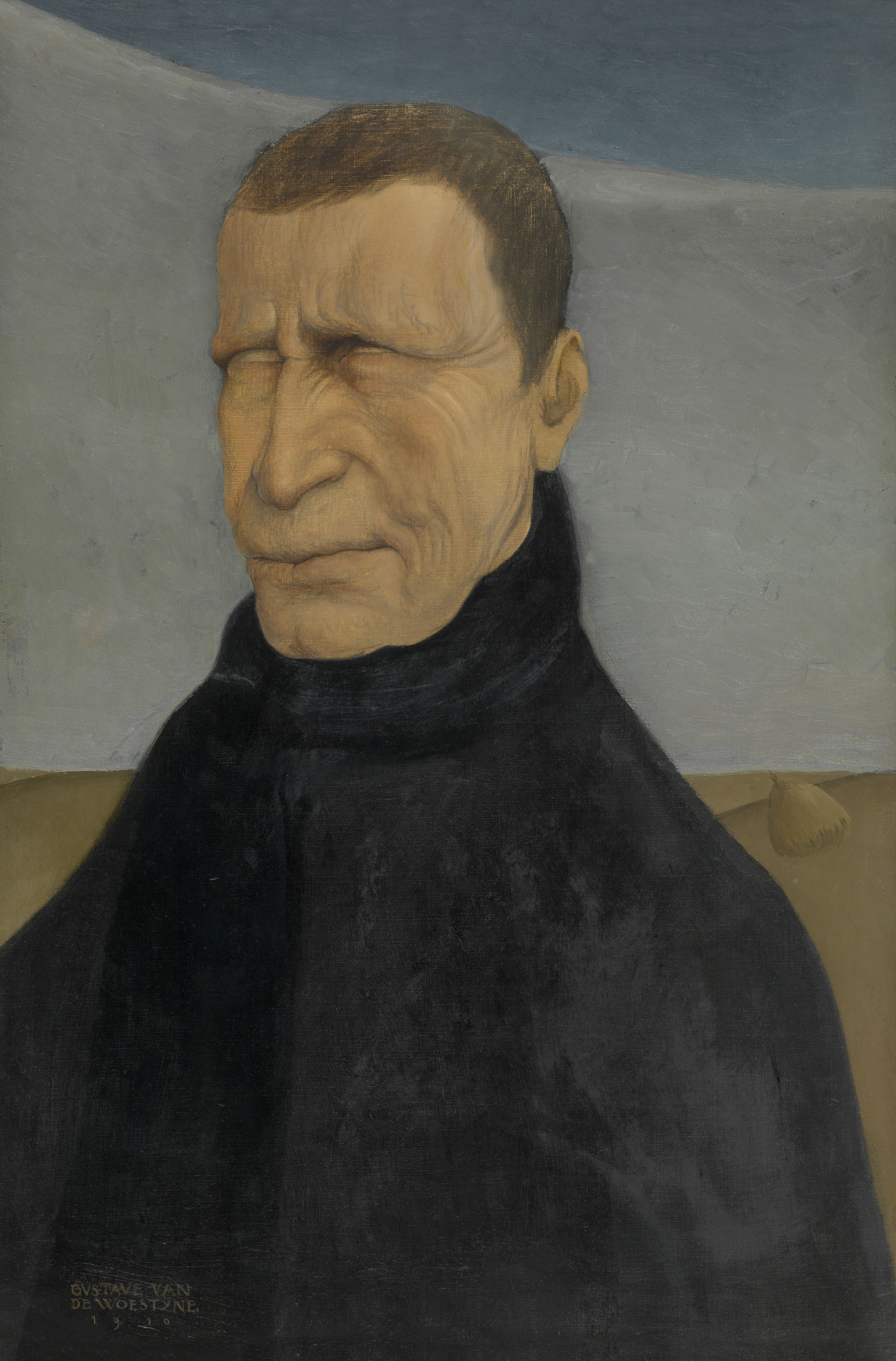
The Blind Man, 1910

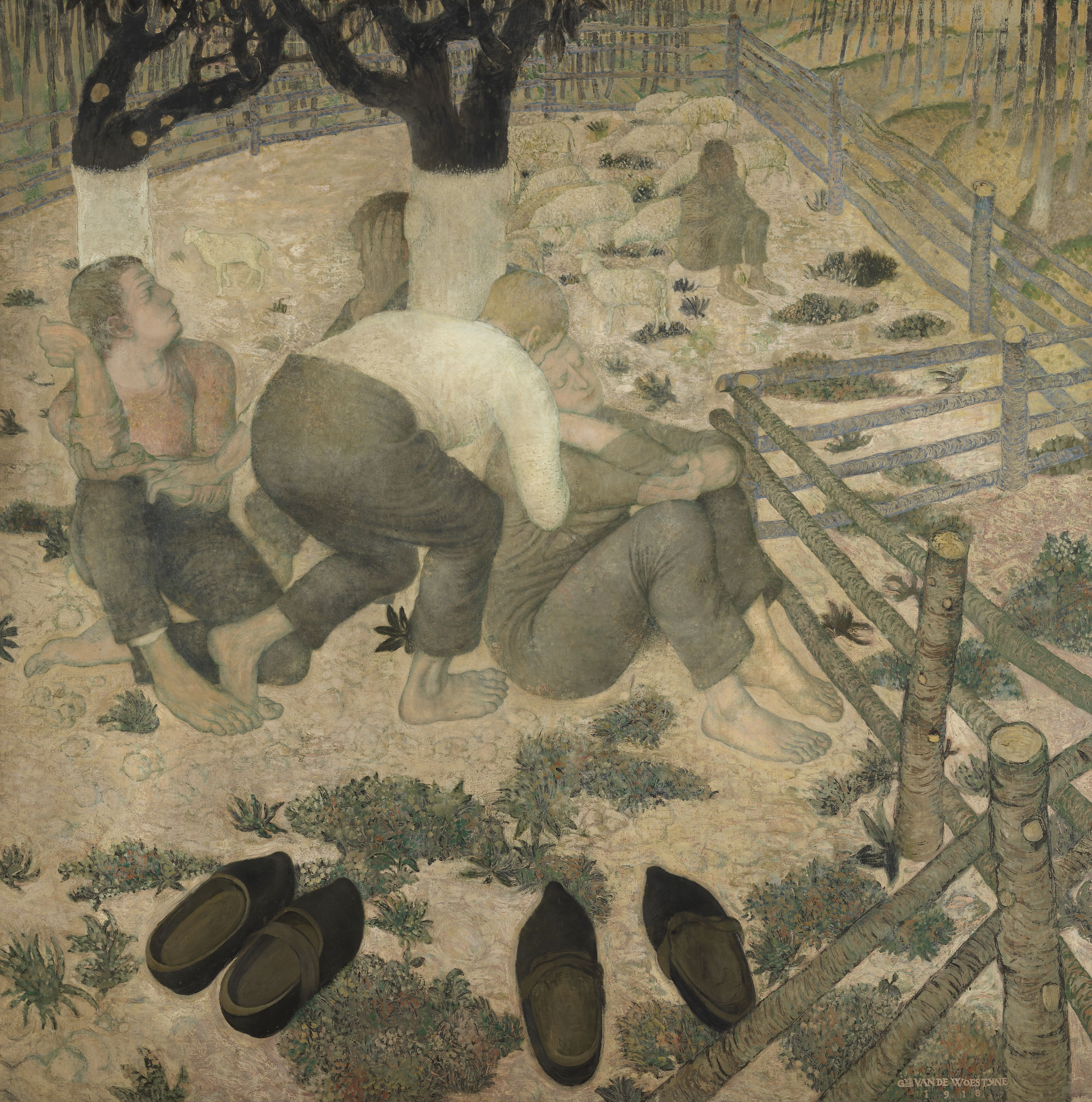
The Sleepers, 1918

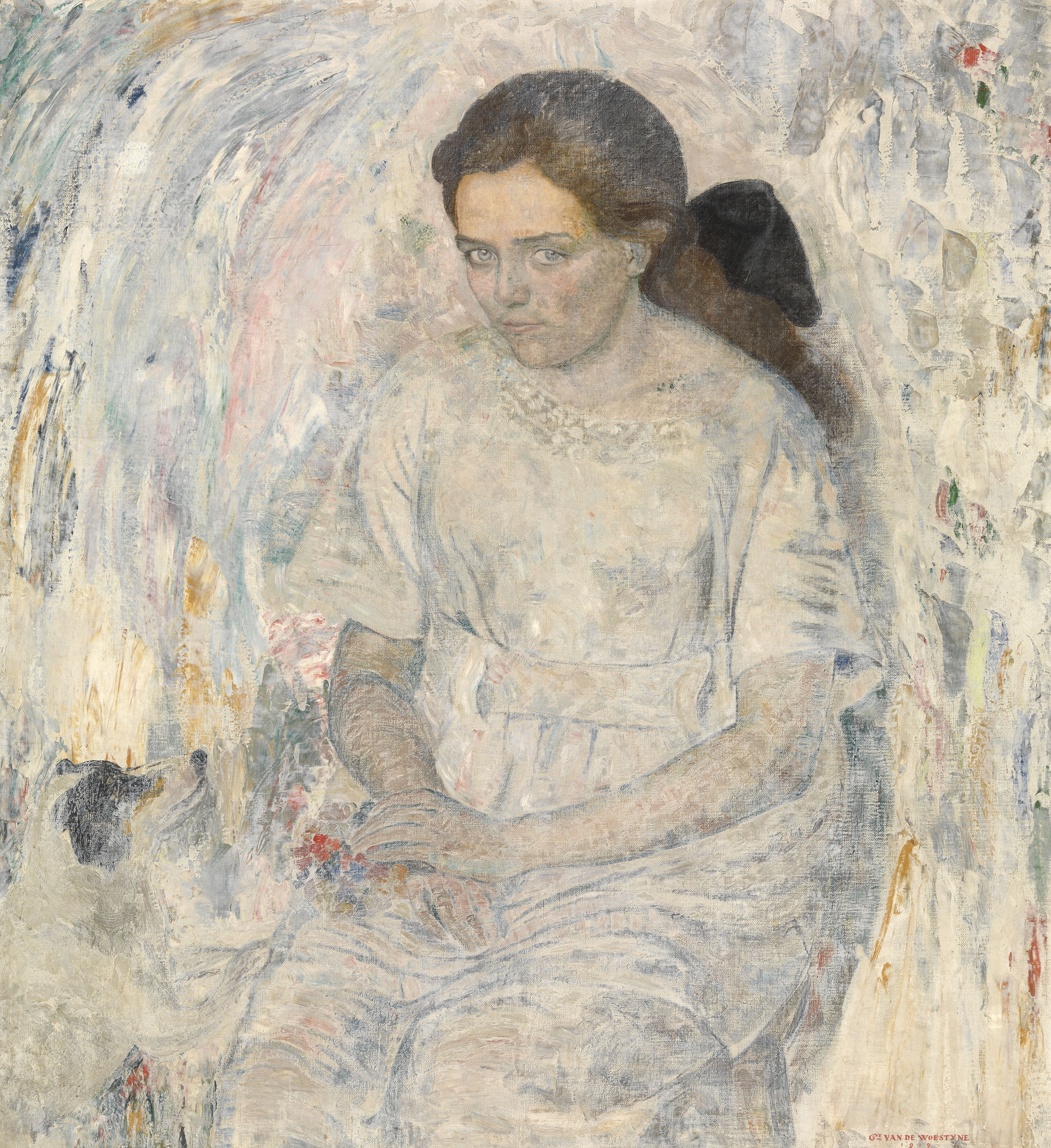
Adrienne, 1921

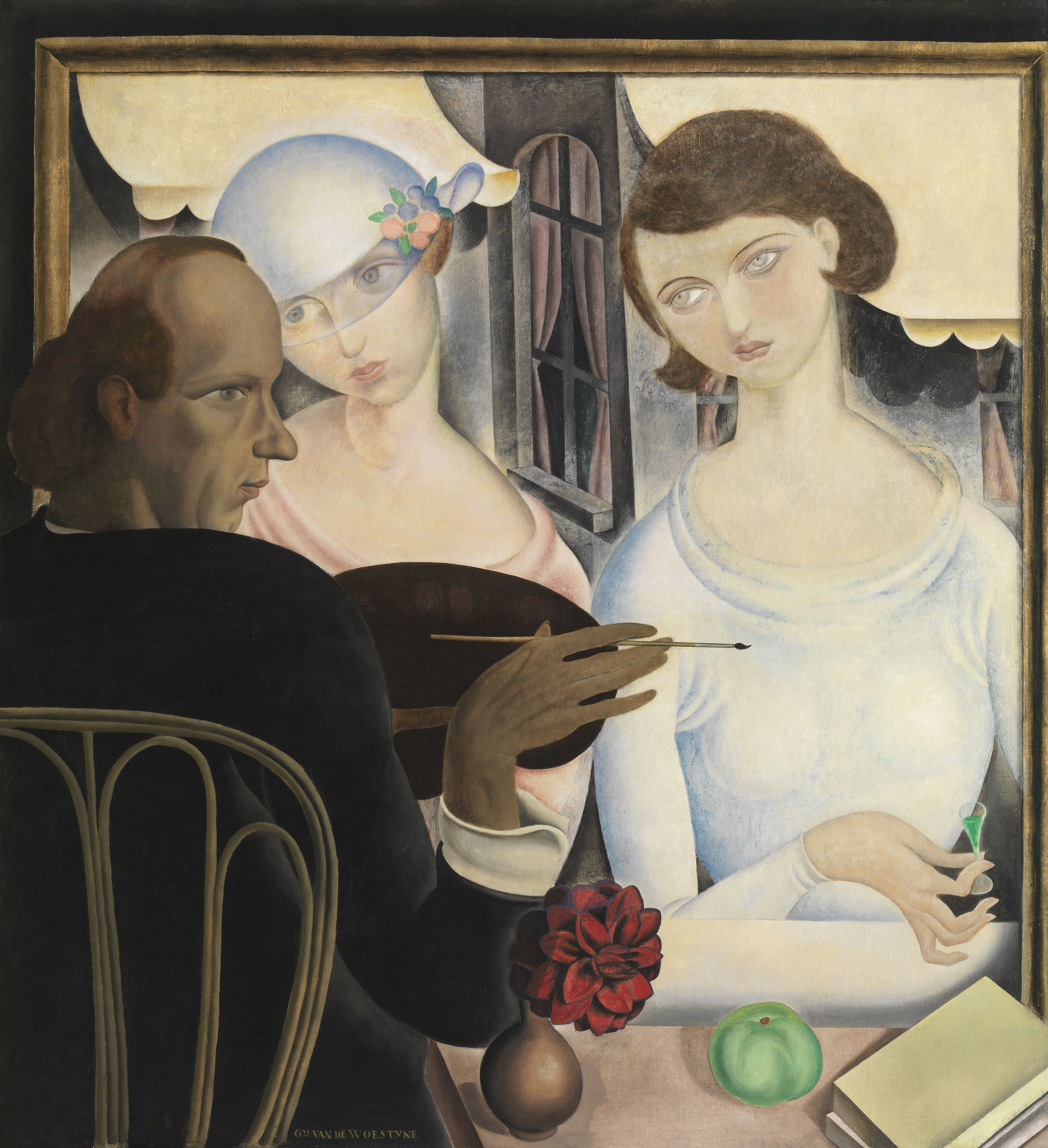
The Liqueur Drinkers, 1922

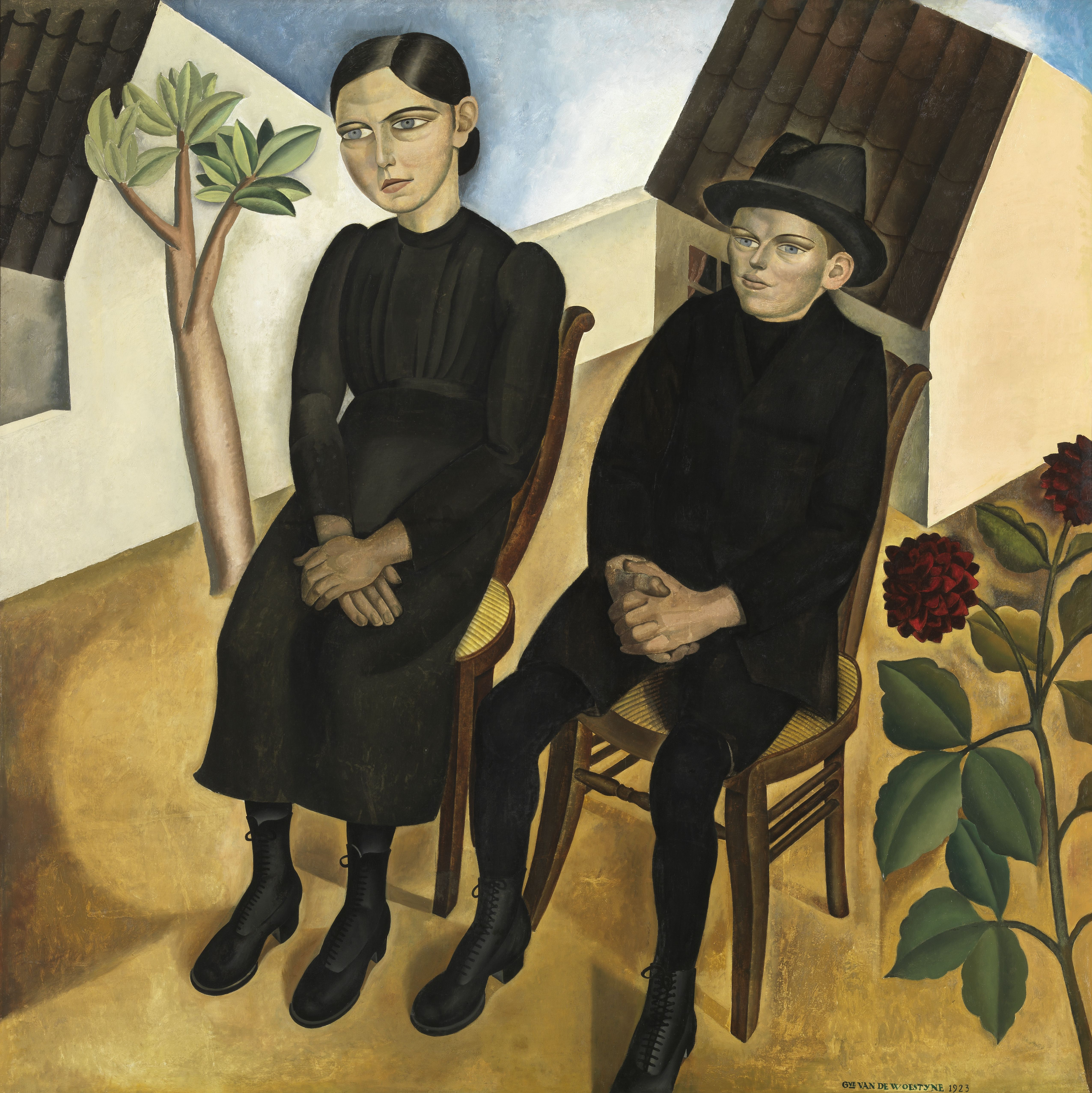
Gaston and His Sister, 1923

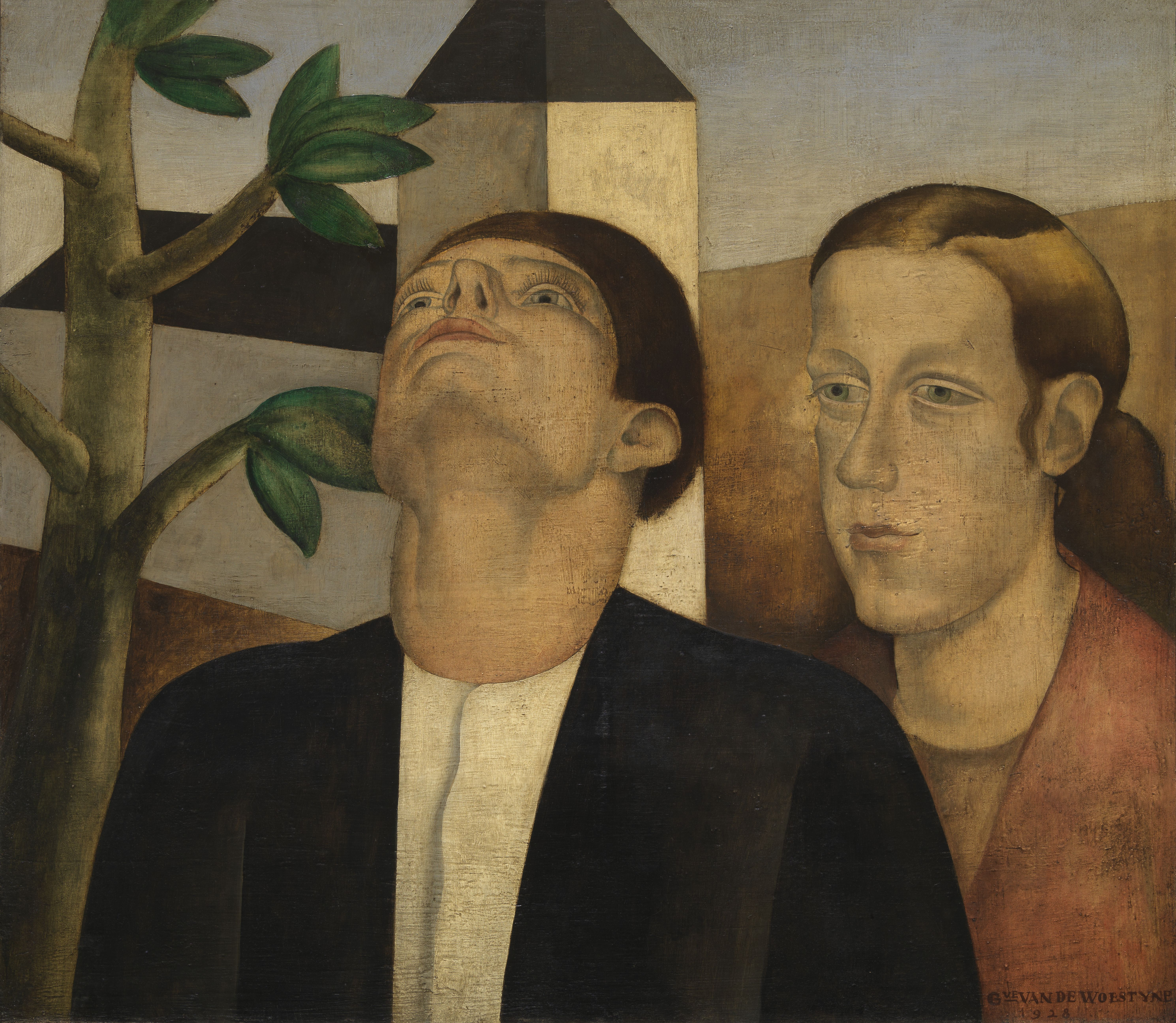
Azure, 1928

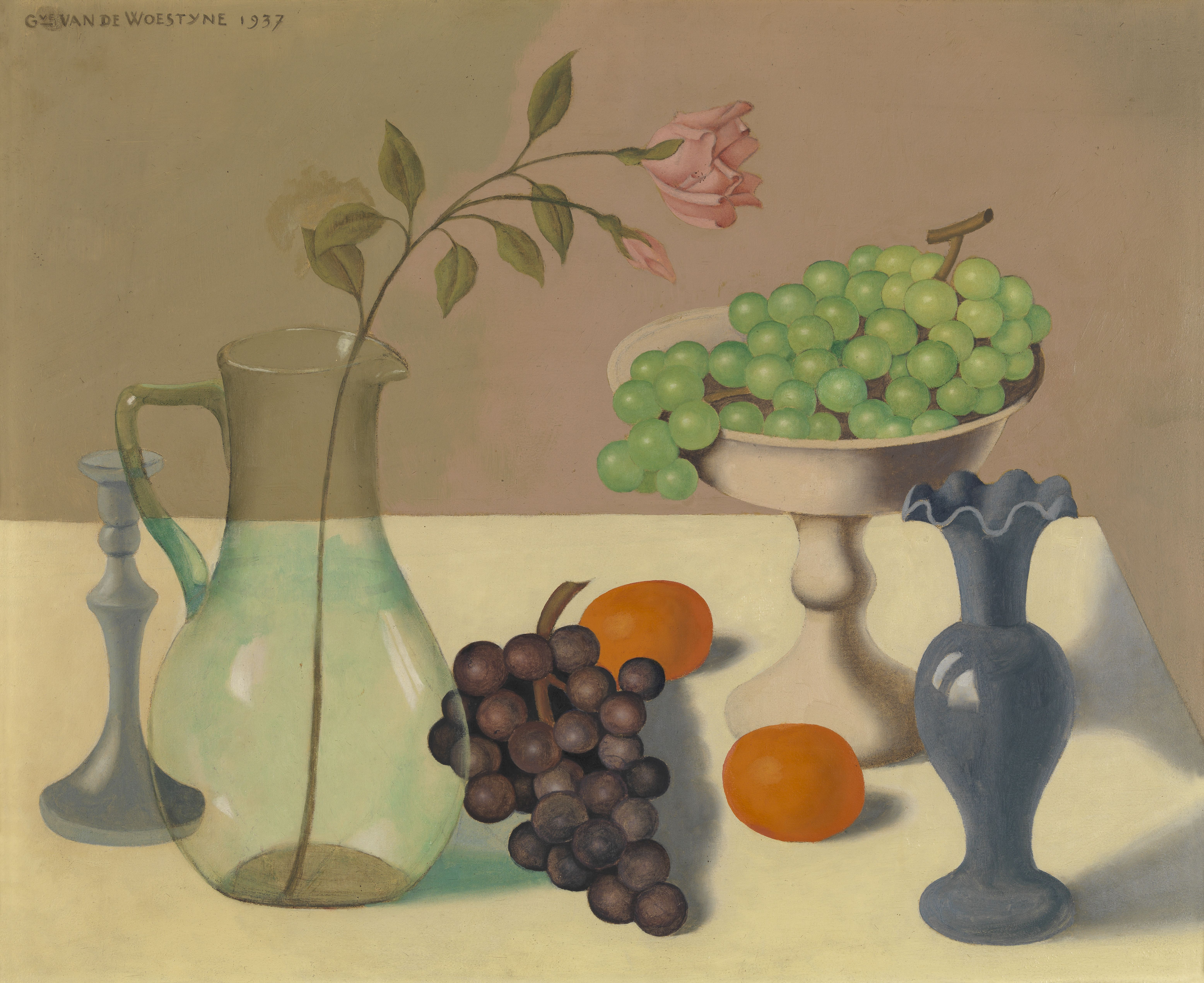
Still life with Grapes, 1937

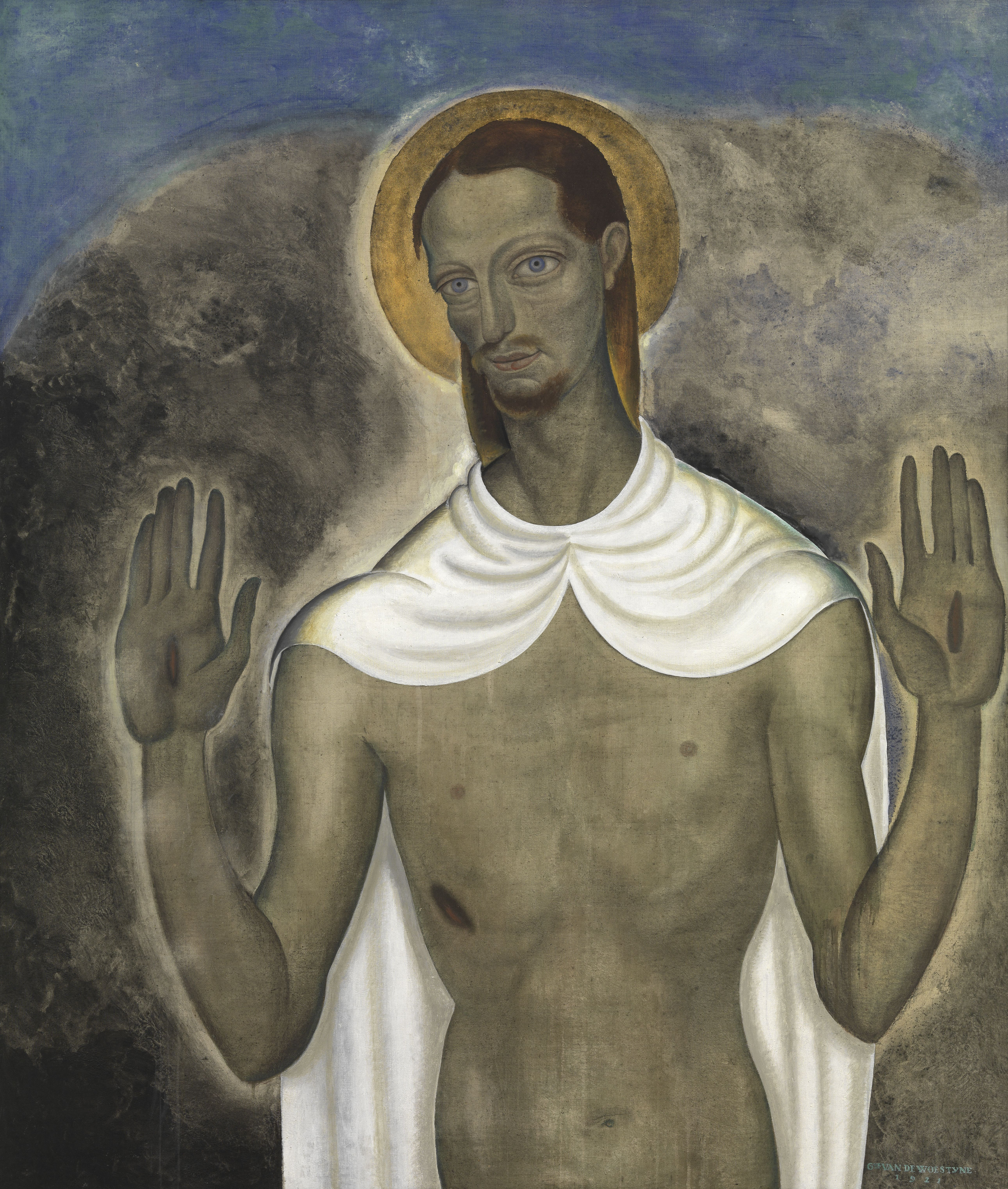
Christ Showing His Wounds, 1921

De twee lentes, 1910

== Gallery ==
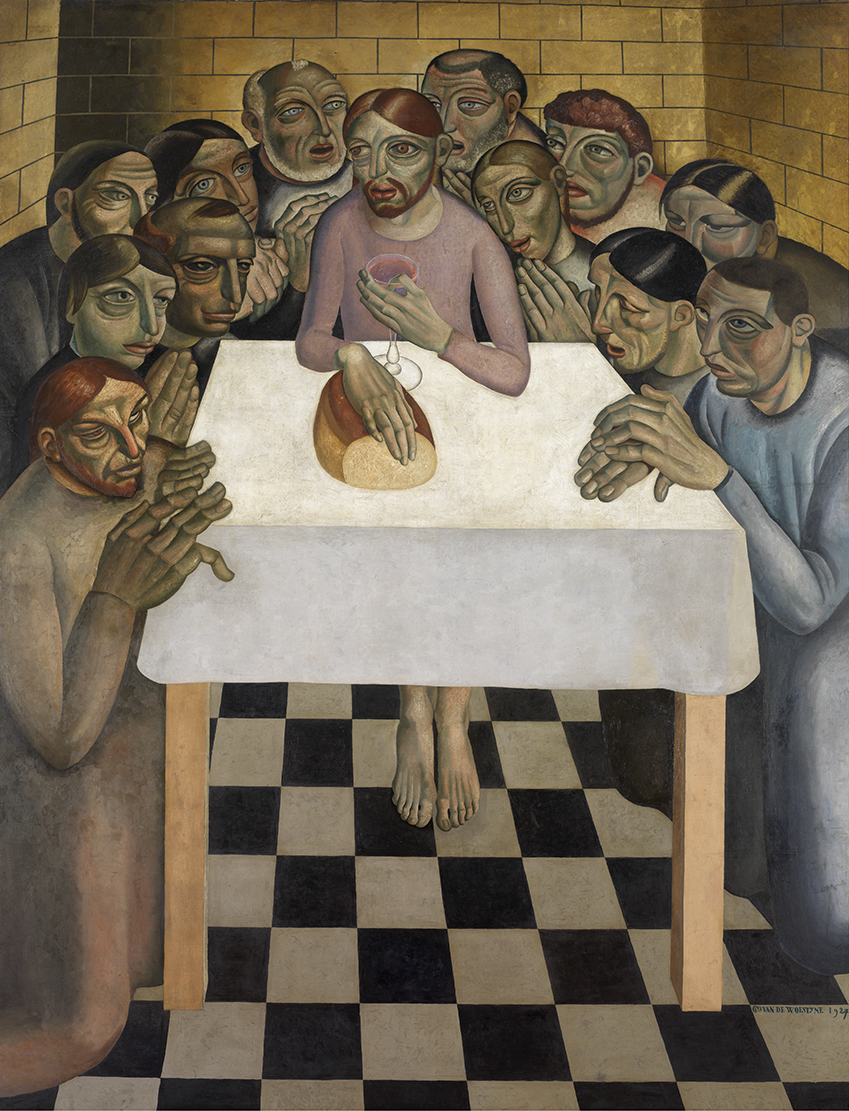
Laatste Avondmaal, Gustave van de Woestyne, 1927, Groeningemuseum, 0040054000.

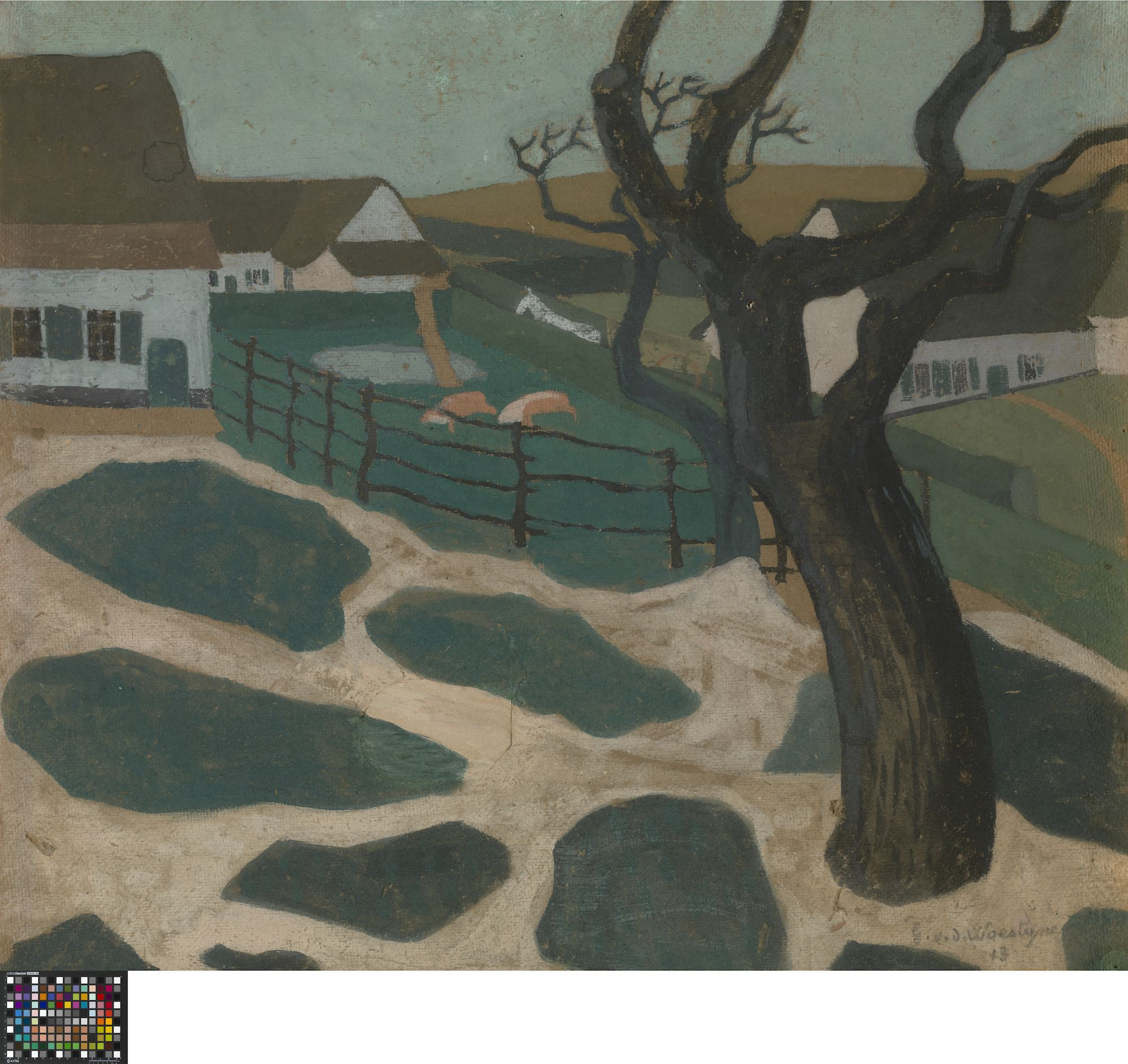
Sunday afternoon in autumn in Museum van Deinze en de Leiestreek

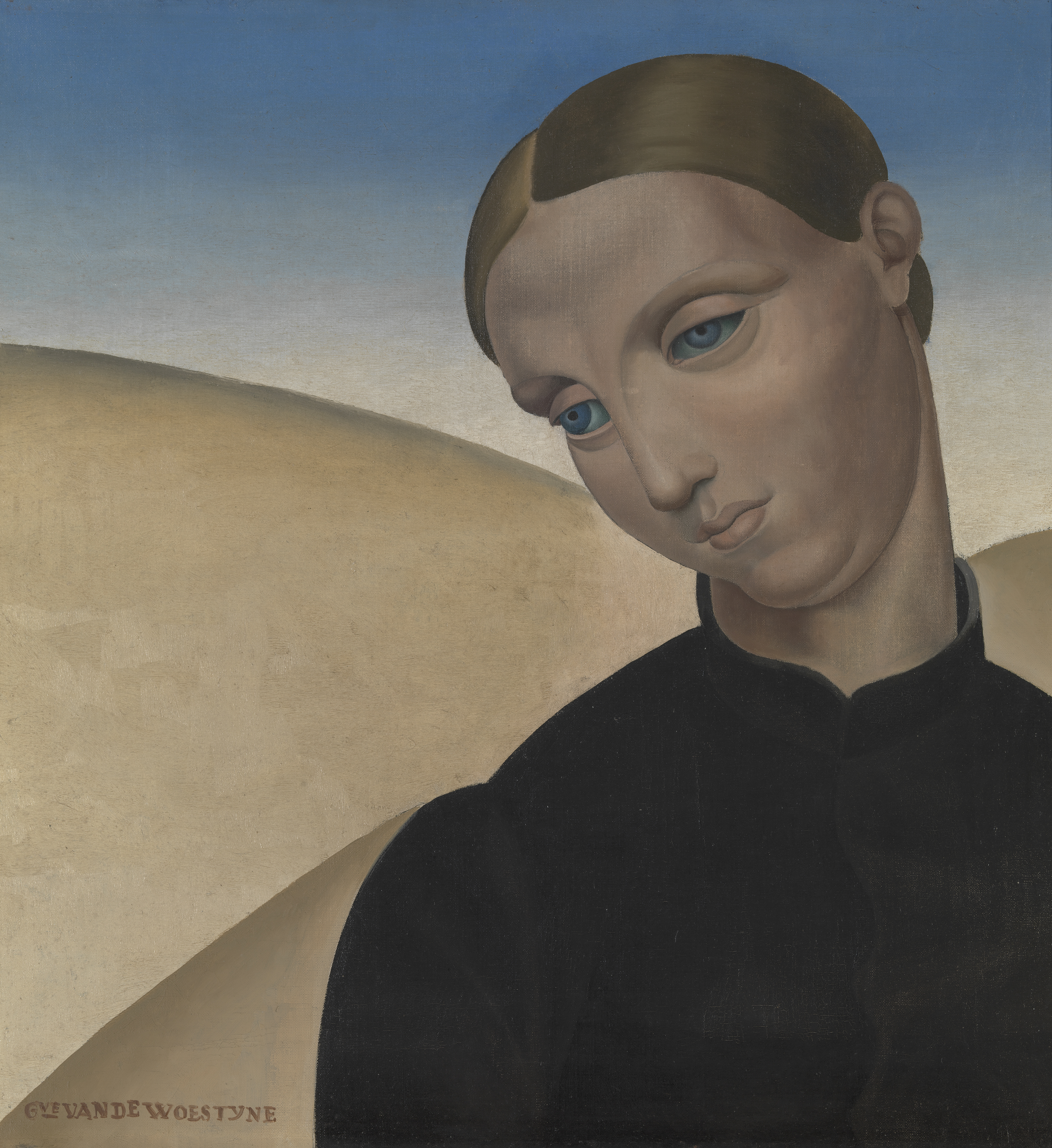
Boerin, ca. 1925, from The Phoebus Foundation collection.

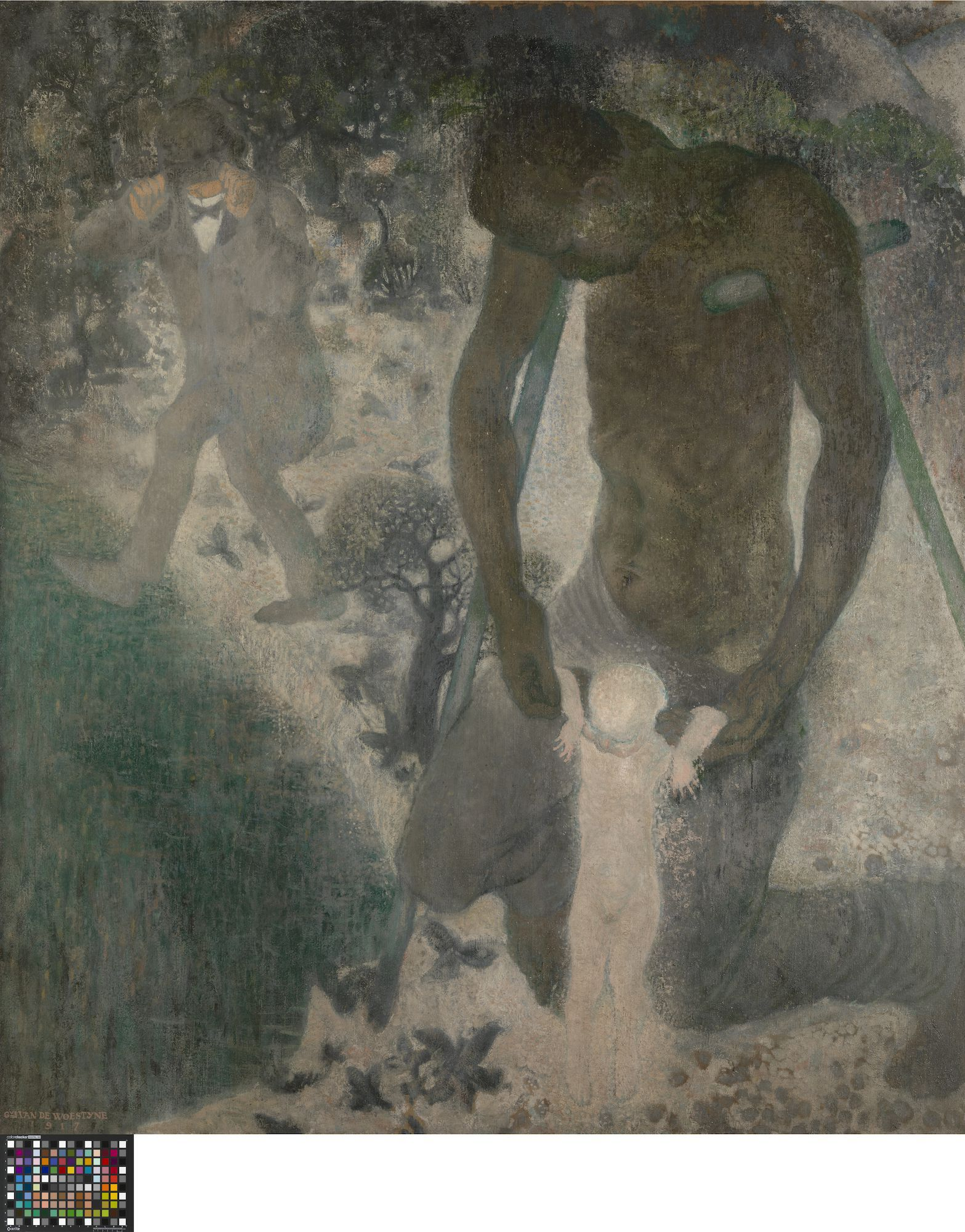
The willful blind and the crippled who wants to teach a child to walk, circa 1917-18

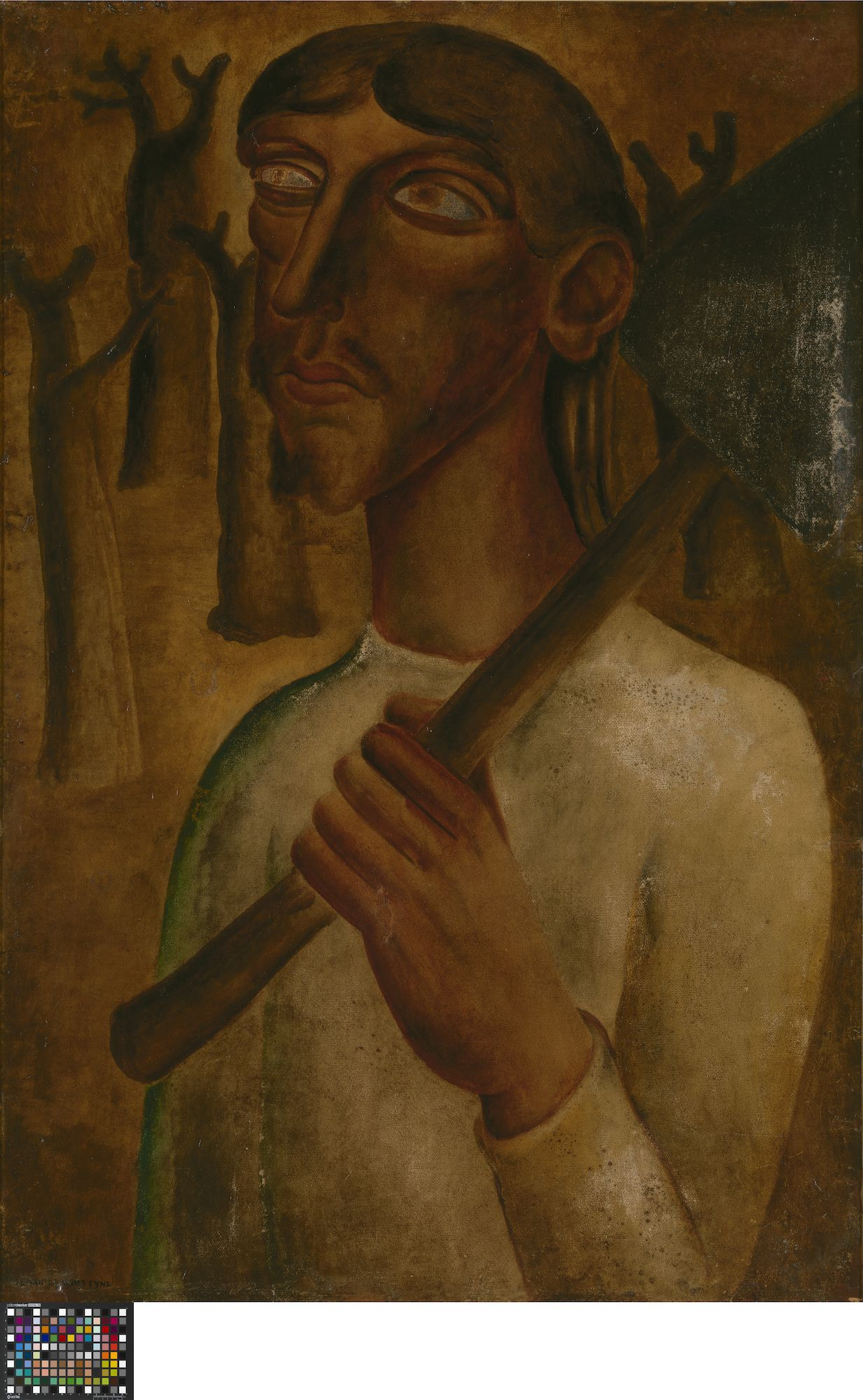
Christ with a sword Museum van Deinze en de Leiestreek

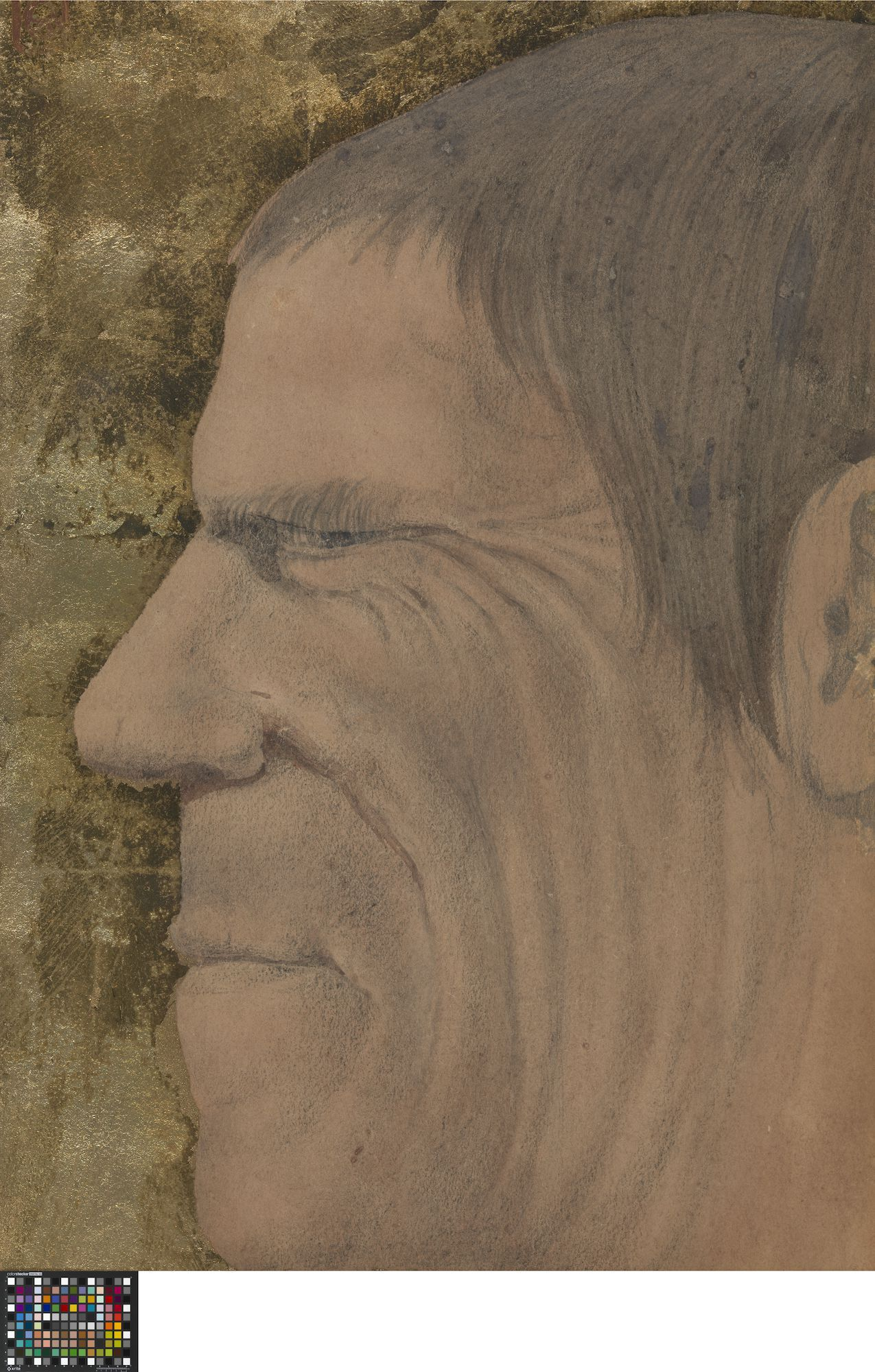
The bad murderer Museum van Deinze en de Leiestreek

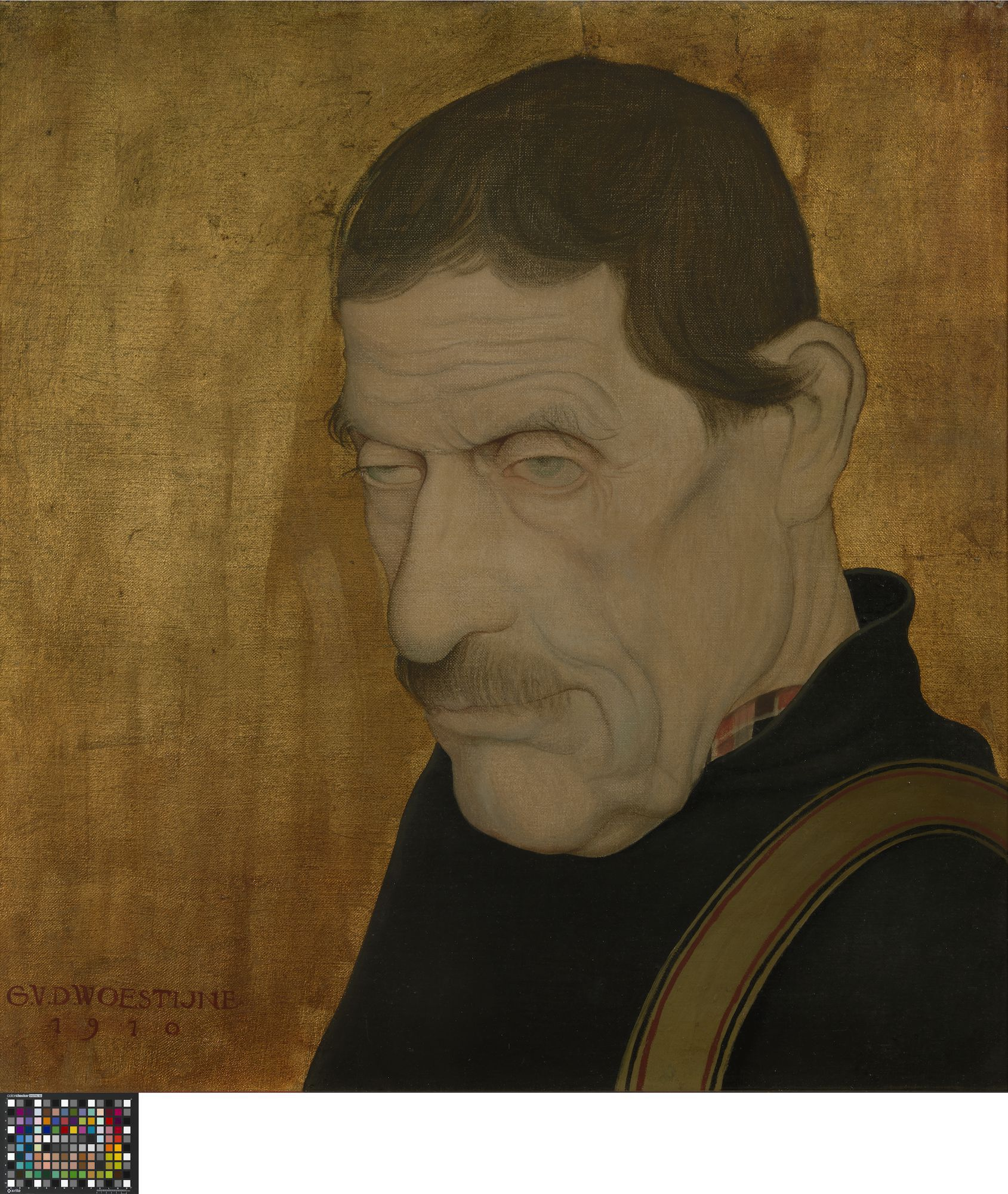
Mannenkop - Nandje Hooft - Museum van Deinze en de Leiestreek

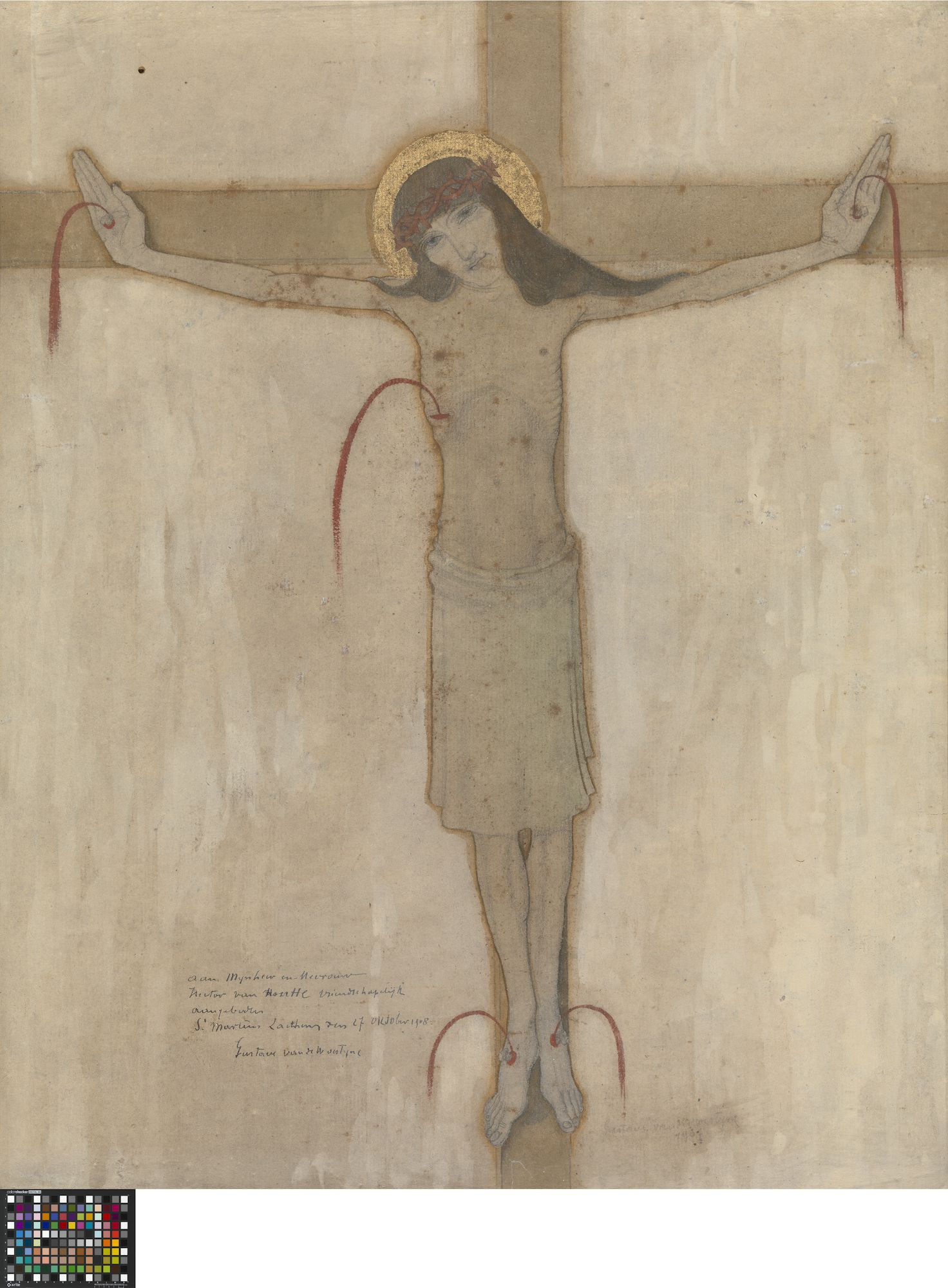
Eucharistic Christ Museum van Deinze en de Leiestreek

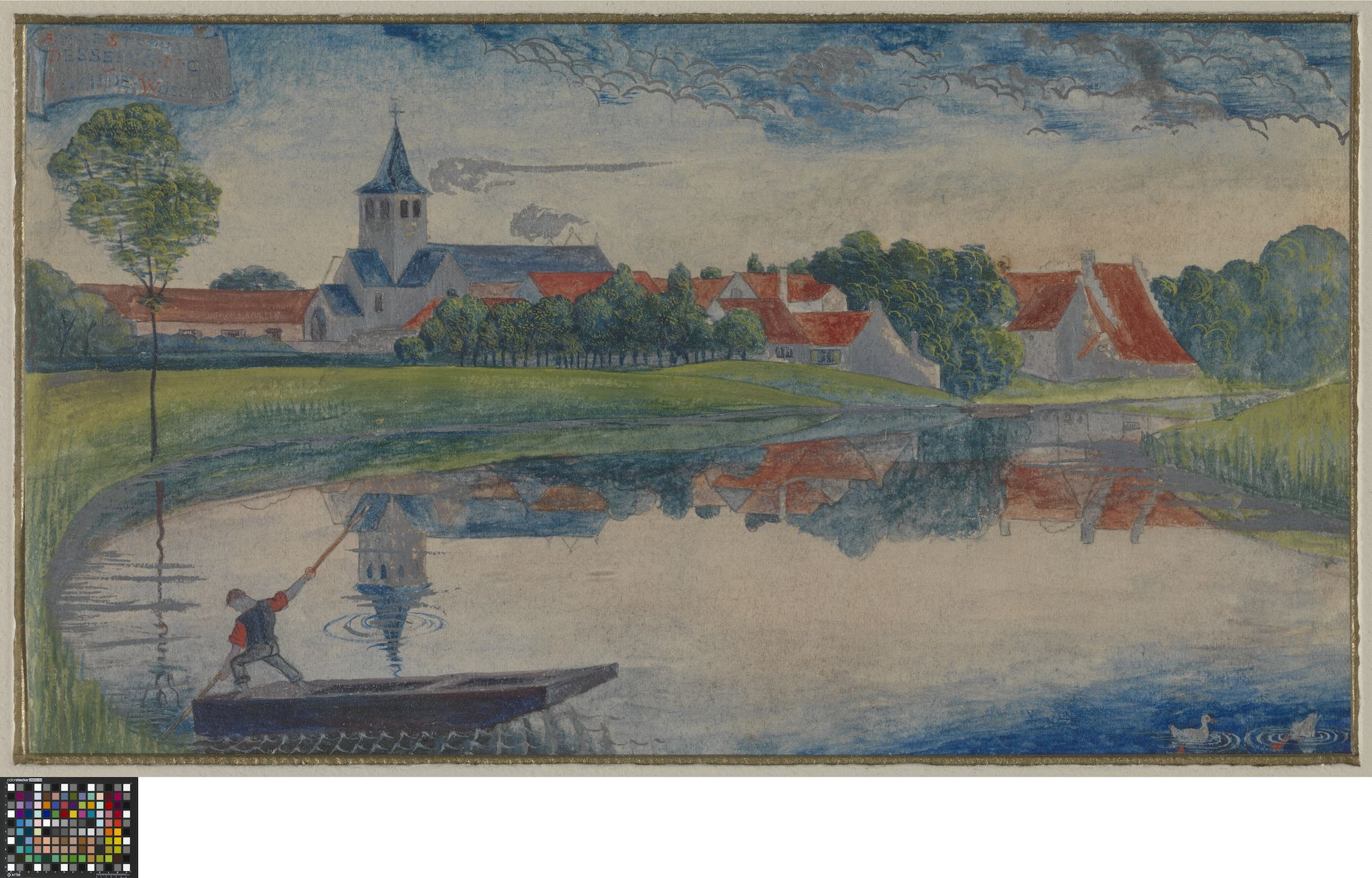
The Slate of Latem Museum van Deinze en de Leiestreek

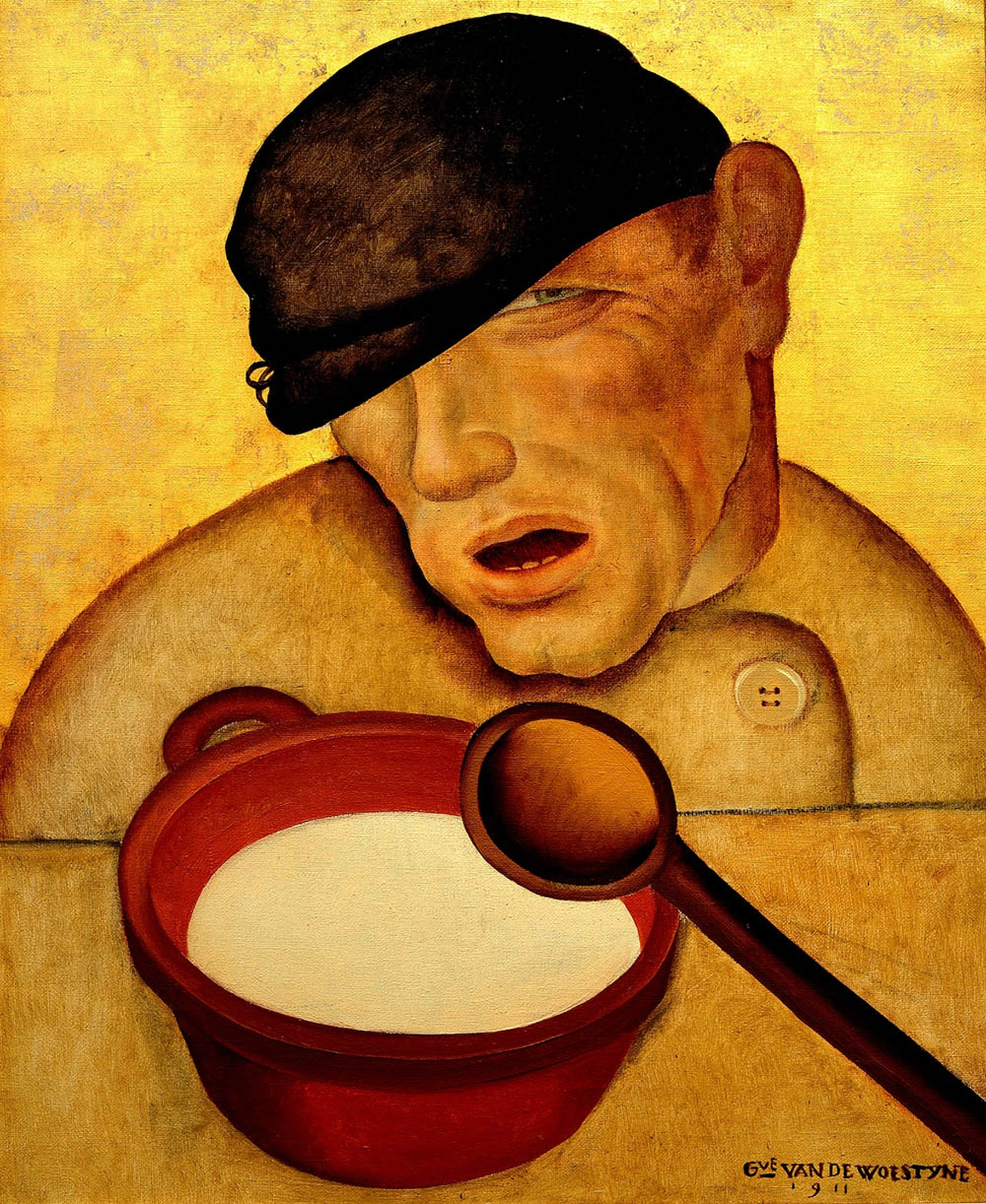
The Porridge Eater (1911)
