= Sint-Martens-Latem =

- Municipality
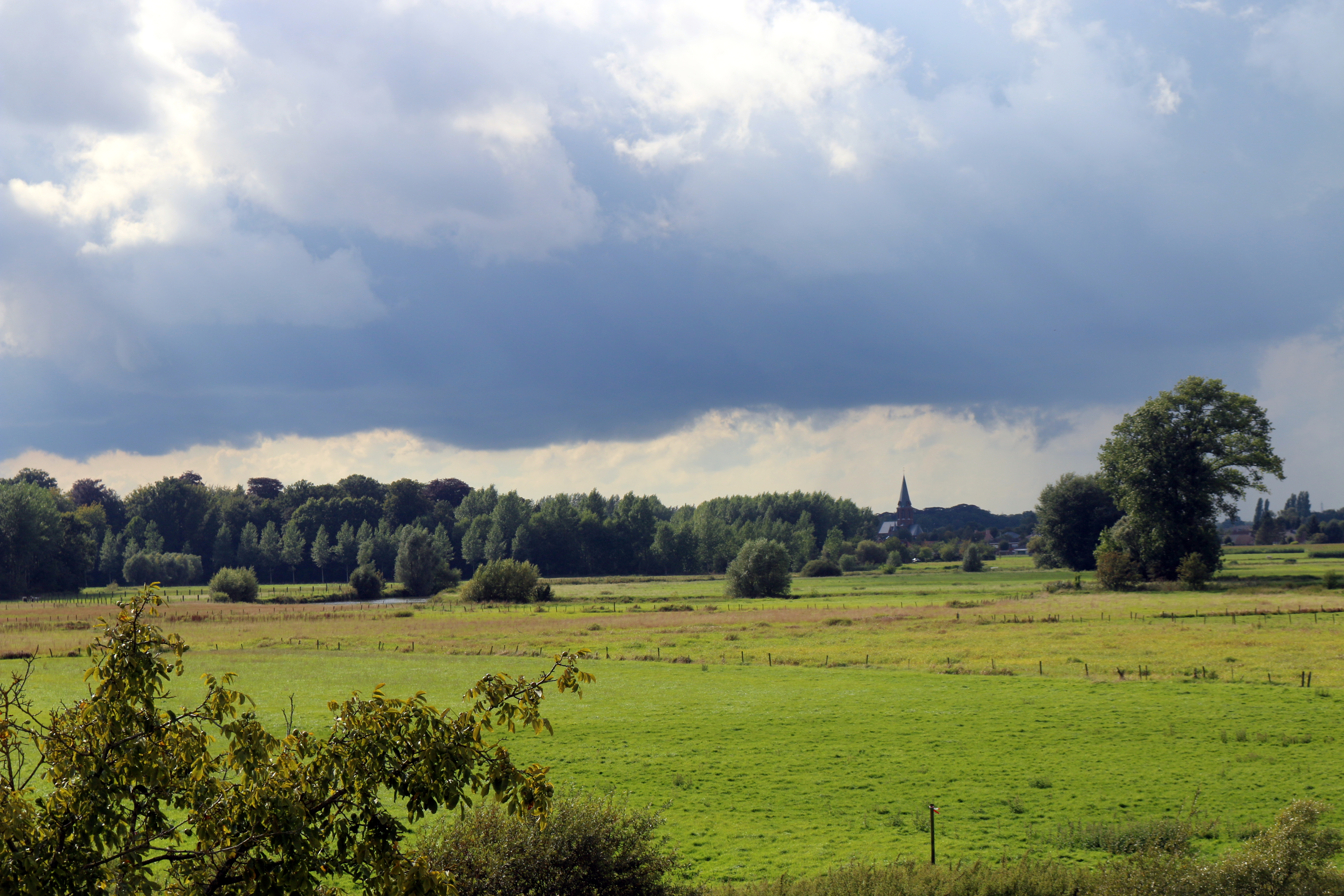

- Flag Coat of arms

- Location of Sint-Martens-Latem in East Flanders
- Interactive map of Sint-Martens-Latem
- Location in Belgium
- Coordinates: 51°01′N 03°38′E
- Country: Belgium
- Community: Flemish Community
- Region: Flemish Region
- Province: East Flanders
- Arrondissement: Ghent

Government
  - Mayor: Agnes Lannoo (Welzijn)
  - Governing party: Welzijn

Area
  - Total: 14.45 km^{2} (5.58 sq mi)

Population (2018-01-01)
  - Total: 8,468
  - Density: 586.0/km^{2} (1,518/sq mi)
- Postal codes: 9830, 9831
- NIS code: 44064
- Area codes: 09
- Website: www.sint-martens-latem.be

Sint-Martens-Latem (Dutch pronunciation: [sɪnt ˌmɑrtəns ˈlaːtəm]) is a municipality located in the Belgian province of East Flanders. The municipality comprises the towns of Deurle and Sint-Martens-Latem proper. In 2021, Sint-Martens-Latem had a total population of 8,285. The total area is 14.34 km^{2}.

While "Latem" used to be known as an artists' colony before World War II, nowadays Sint-Martens-Latem is one of the wealthiest residential municipalities in Belgium.

== Notable people ==
- Luc-Peter Crombé, painter
- Gustave De Smet, painter
- George Minne, sculptor and artist
- Constant Permeke, painter
- Elisabeth de Saedeleer, textile artist
- Gustave Van de Woestijne, painter
- Rudolf Werthen, violinist & conductor

== Gallery ==
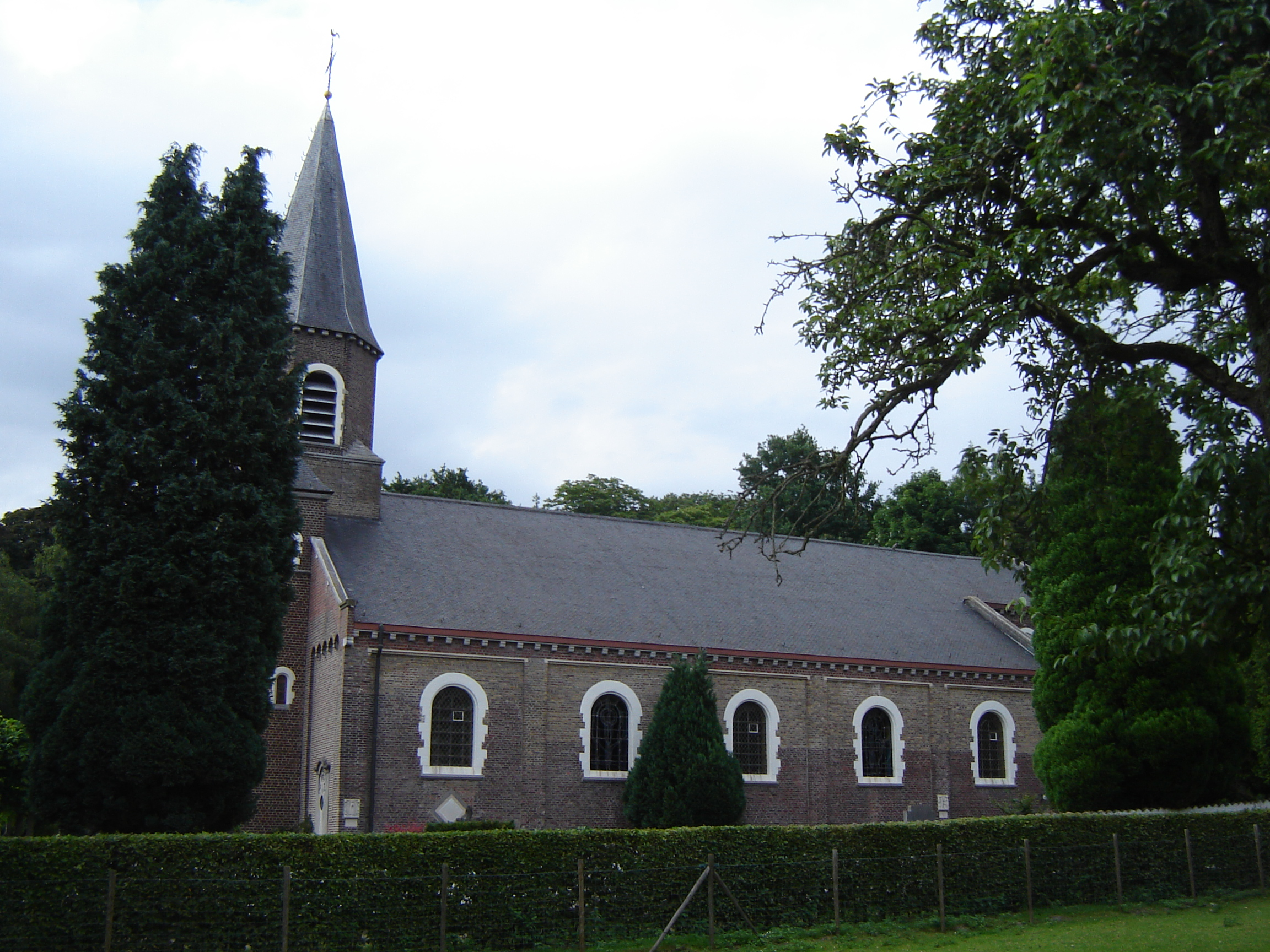
Sint-Aldegondischurch in Deurle

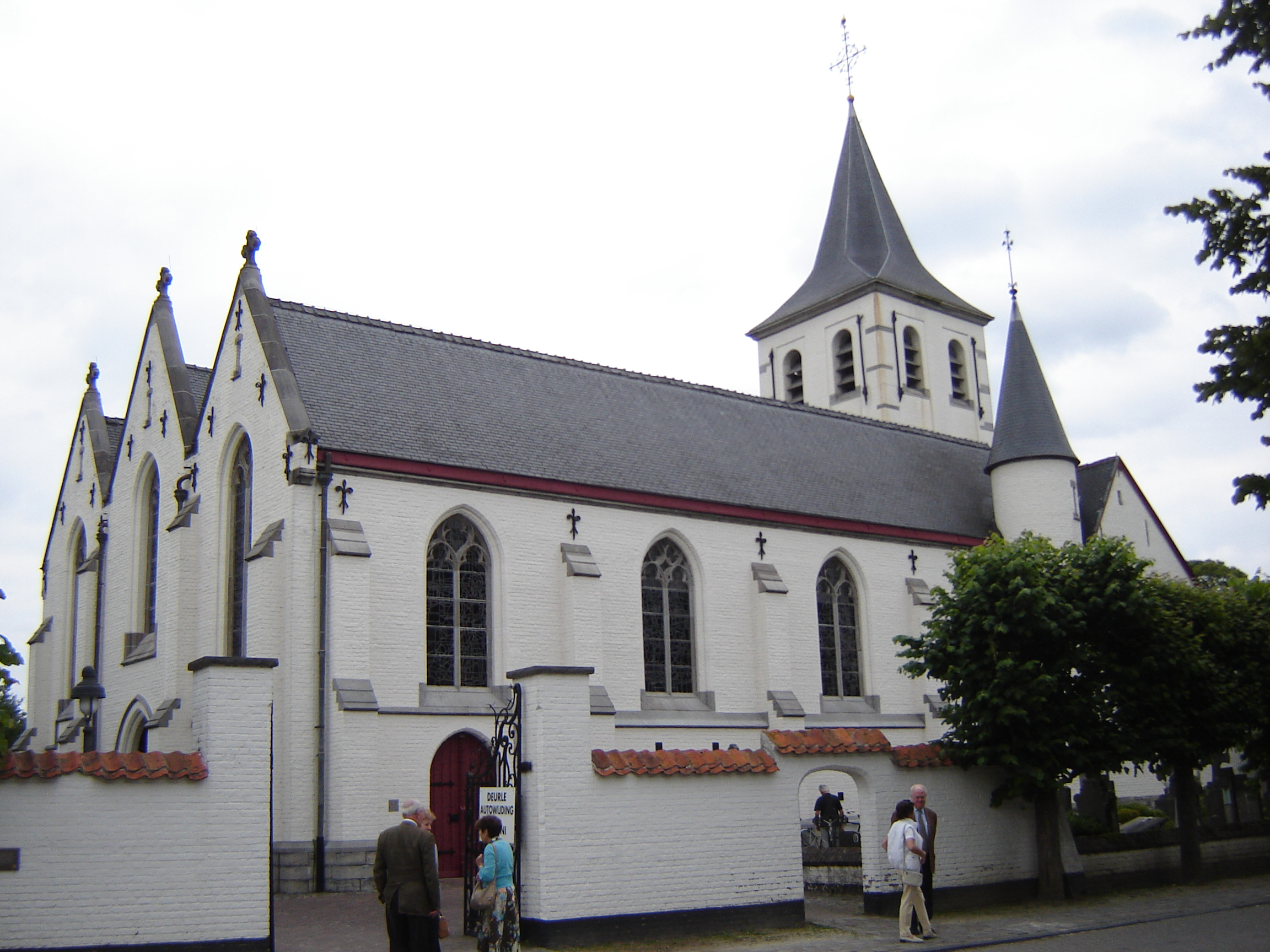
Sint-Martinuschurch in Sint-Martens-Latem

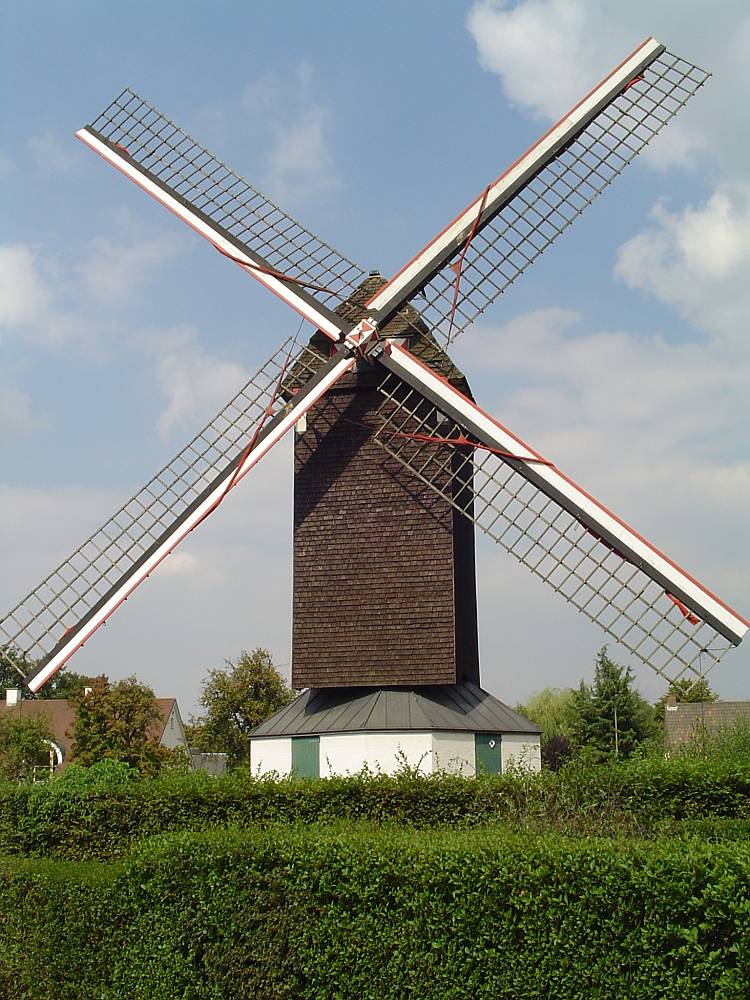
Koutermolen, Latemse Molen, Sint-Baafsmolen, a post mill
