= Museum van Deinze en de Leiestreek =

Museum in Deinze, Belgium

Coordinates: 50.9813°N 3.5256°E

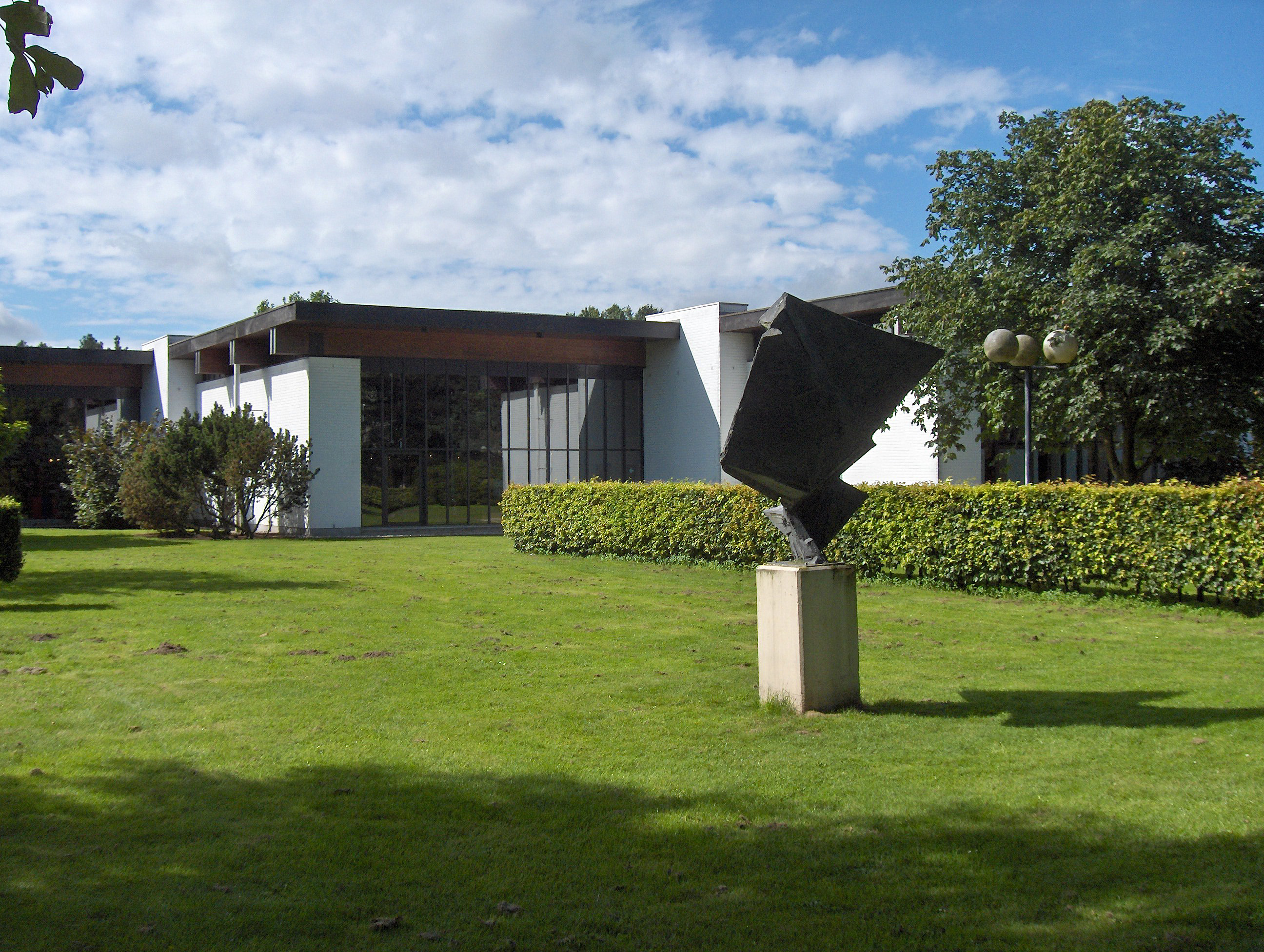
External view of the museum

Museum van Deinze en de Leiestreek (Dutch for 'Museum of Deinze and the Leie region'), also known as mudel, is a museum of fine arts and folklore located in the city of Deinze, Belgium. The permanent exhibition displays exclusively artworks produced by artists who worked or lived in the region from about 1879 to today as well as folkloristic objects.

== History ==
The museum collection goes back to the objects collected by the Deinze Art and Archaeological Circle, which was founded in 1928. The Circle acquired archaeological objects and documents as well as works of art. At the same time, the city of Deinze had acquired through the years a fairly large collection of works, partly through donations and partly through purchase by the city government out of a budget set aside for the acquisition of artworks.

In 1941 a proposal was launched to establish a city museum in Deinze solely to show the work of artists from the Leie region, with an emphasis on the work of artists working in the village of Sint-Martens-Latem (often shortened to ‘Latem’). The donation of the masterwork 'Beet harvest' of Emile Claus by the artist's widow to the town was a decisive factor in the finalisation of the plan.

The Museum was officially established on 7 March 1942. The Belgian state provided support by offering to provide loans from its collection of art works. The Deinze Art and Archaeological Circle also gave several works from its collection on loan to the museum, but it retained its archaeological objects and archival material.

The collection of the town of Deinze and the collection of the Deinze Art and Archaeological Circle were originally displayed in a neo-Gothic building near the church of Deinze. As the art collection grew through purchases and donations it became necessary to build a new museum. On 28 November 1981 the new museum was inaugurated. The new building is located near the center of the city and along the river Leie. It was the first building built in Belgium solely for the purpose of serving as a museum after World War II.

== Collection ==
The museum still retains the original distinction between fine arts and folklore.

In accordance with the original objective of the museum, the fine arts collection exclusively holds works created by artists who lived or worked in the Leie region. The collection is presented chronologically. Romantic realism, impressionism, symbolism, expressionism, surrealism, figurative and abstract movements are all represented. The collection’s works include paintings, sculptures and prints by leading artists such as Emile Claus, Albert Servaes, Constant Permeke, Gustave Van de Woestijne, Valerius de Saedeleer, Frits Van den Berghe, Jules De Bruycker, Roger Raveel, Anna De Weert and Raoul De Keyser.

The second section of the museum contains objects on folklore, handicraft and history from the region. The Leie region was an important production area with a rich and very distinct industrial past. The two industries that were particularly important to Deinze in the 19th century and the first half of the 20th century - the silk industry and the production of prams and toys - are represented extensively in the collection.

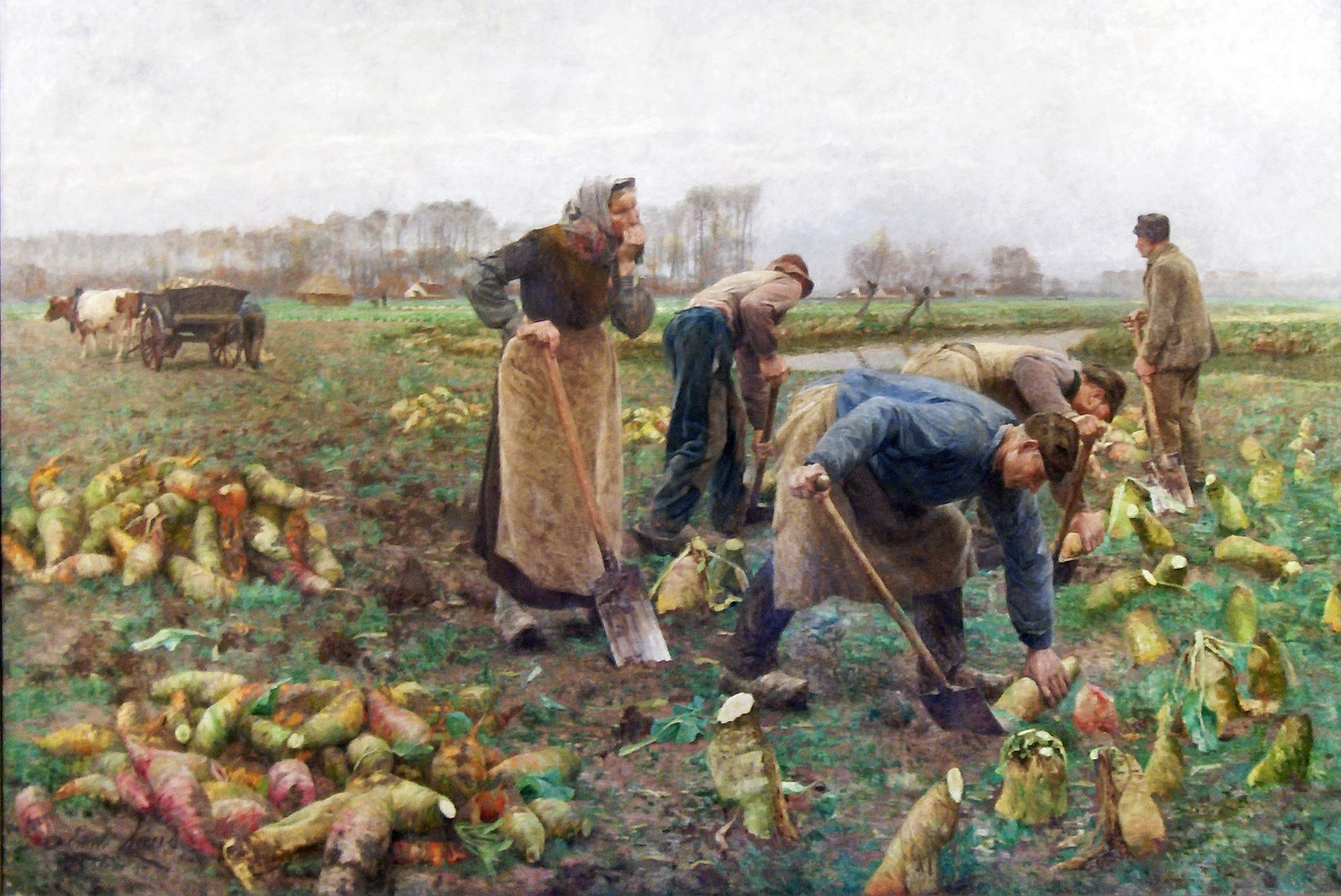
Beet harvest by Emile Claus

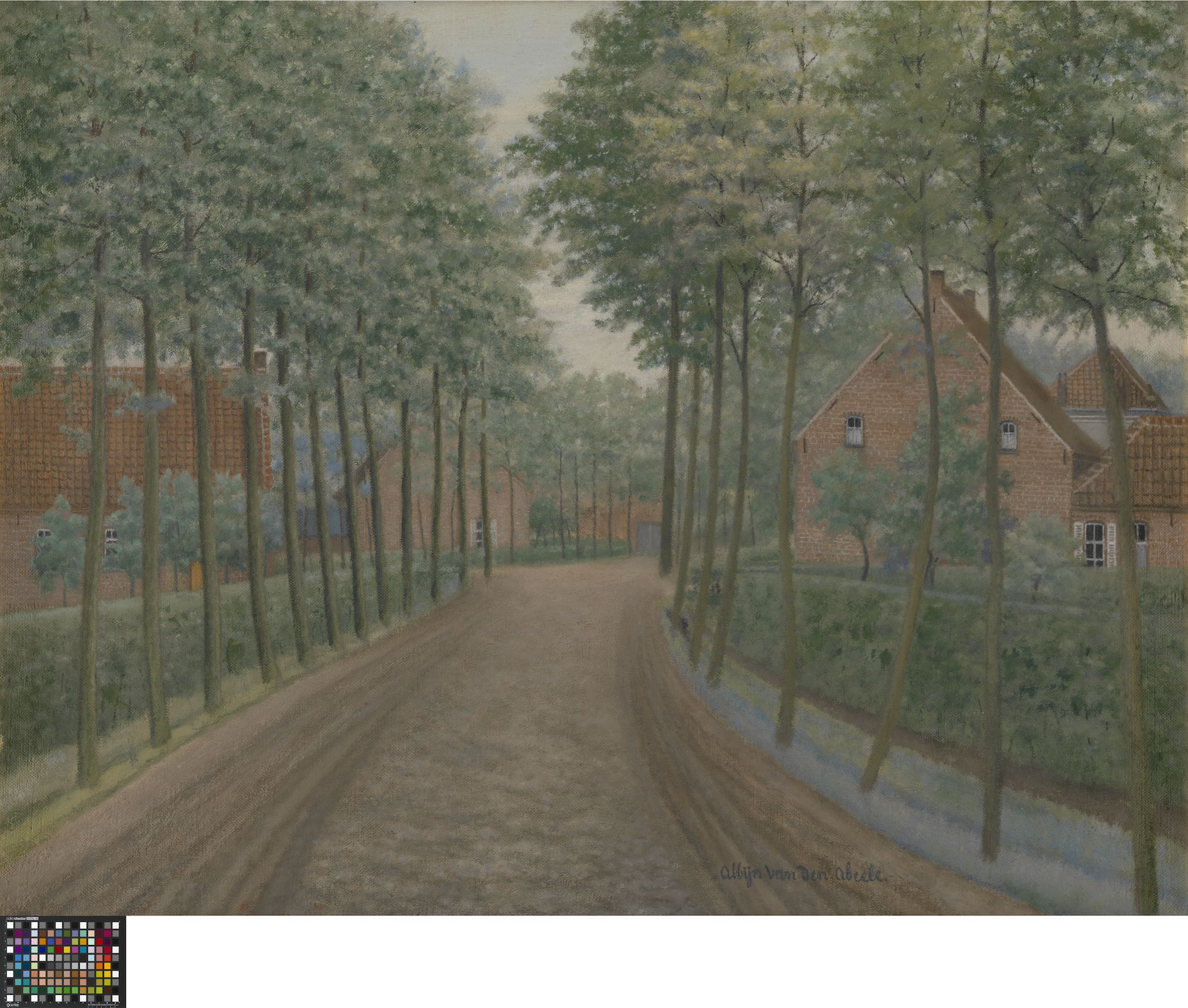
Dorpsstraat - A corner of my neighborhood Albijn Van den Abeele

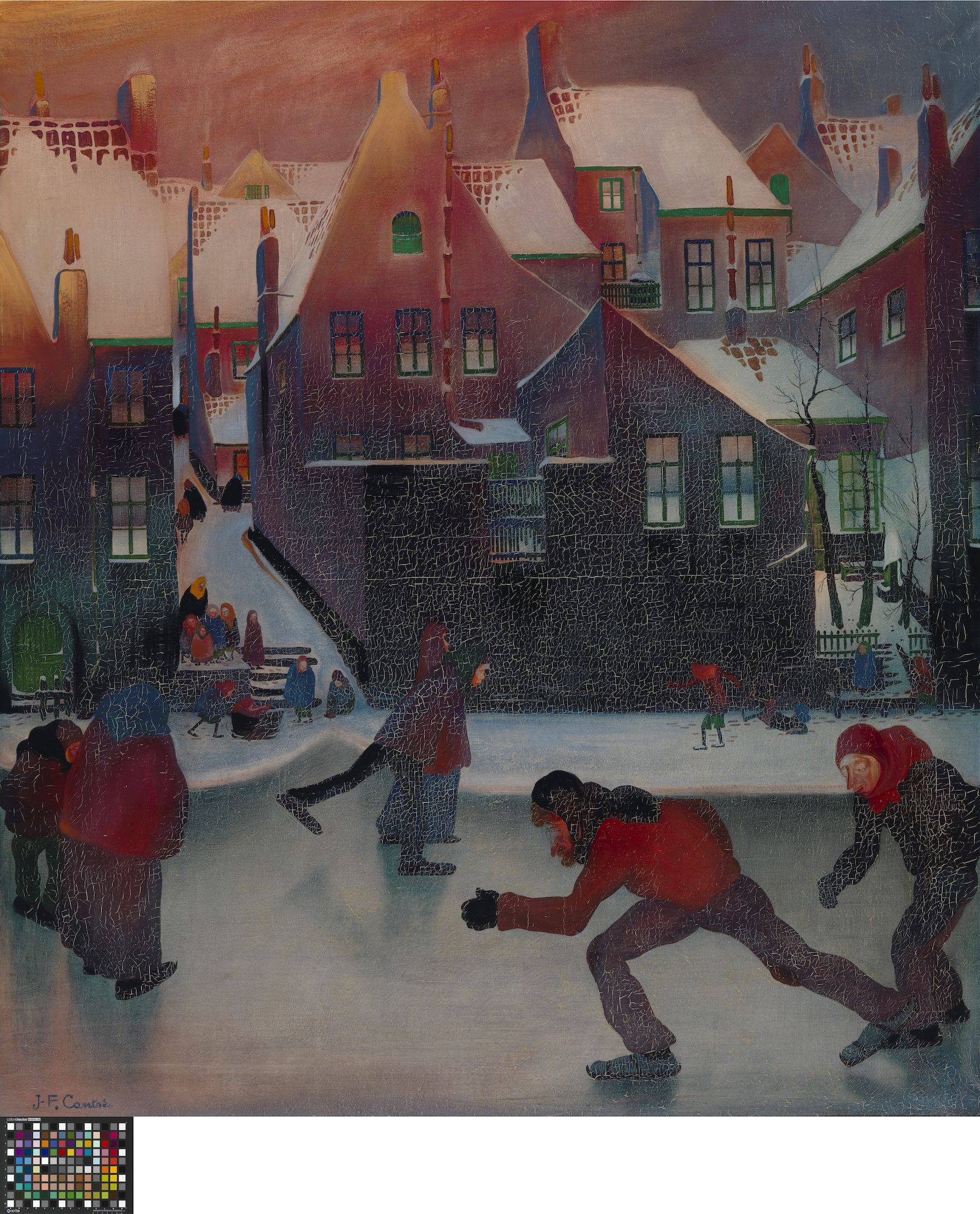
Skaters by Jan-Frans Cantré

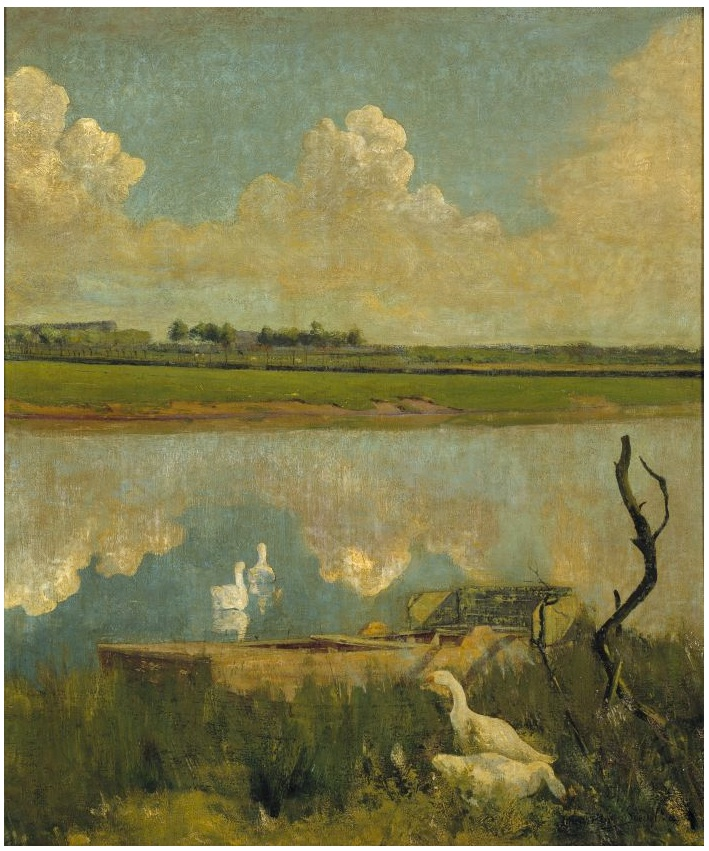
Geese on the Leie by Valerius de Saedeleer

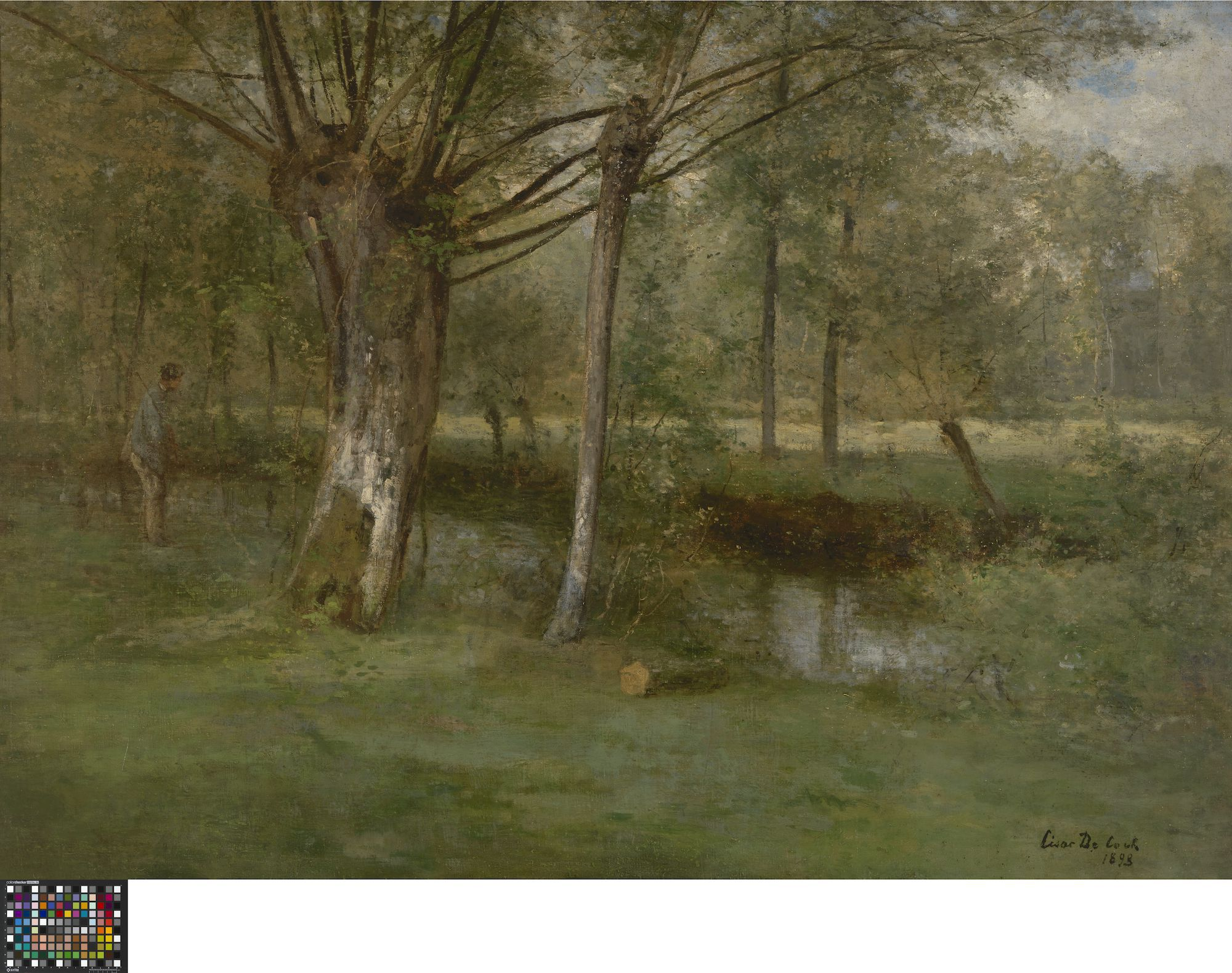
The pond by César De Cock

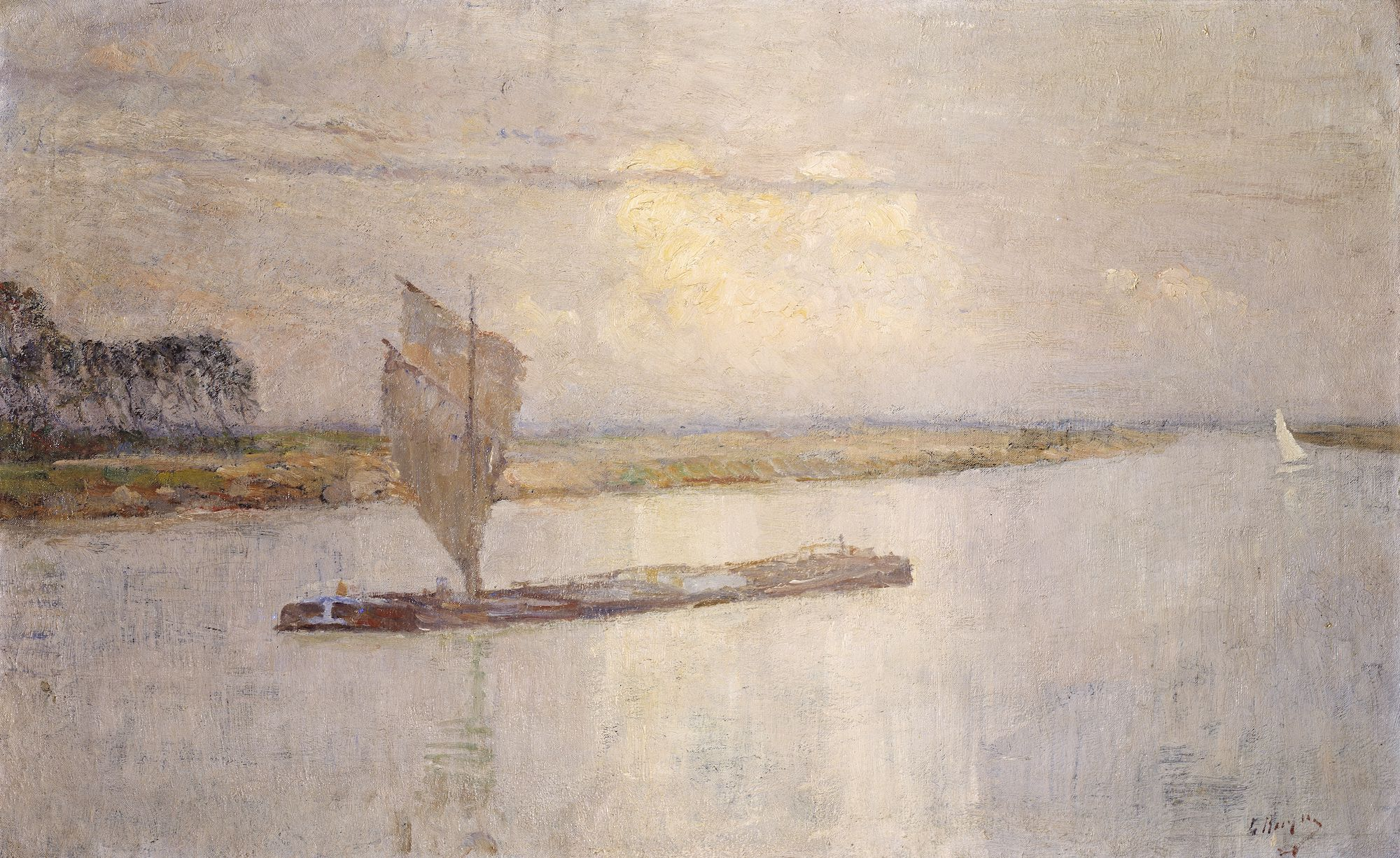
Boat on the Ghent-Terneuzen canal by Georges Buysse

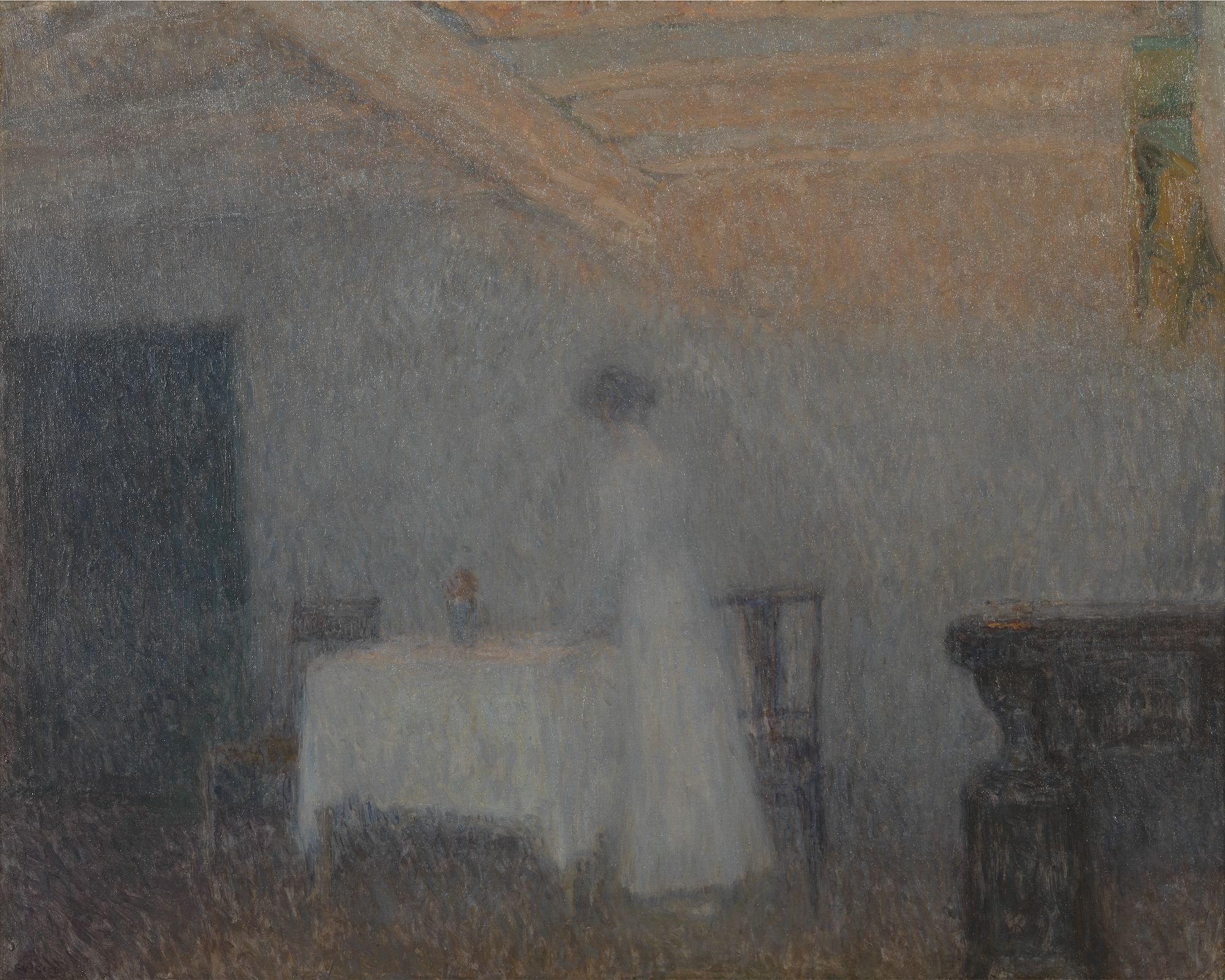
White interior by Frits Van den Berghe

Slaapkamer of het groene bed. Gustave De Smet. c. 1915
