= The Blind Man (painting) =

Painting by Gustave Van de Woestyne

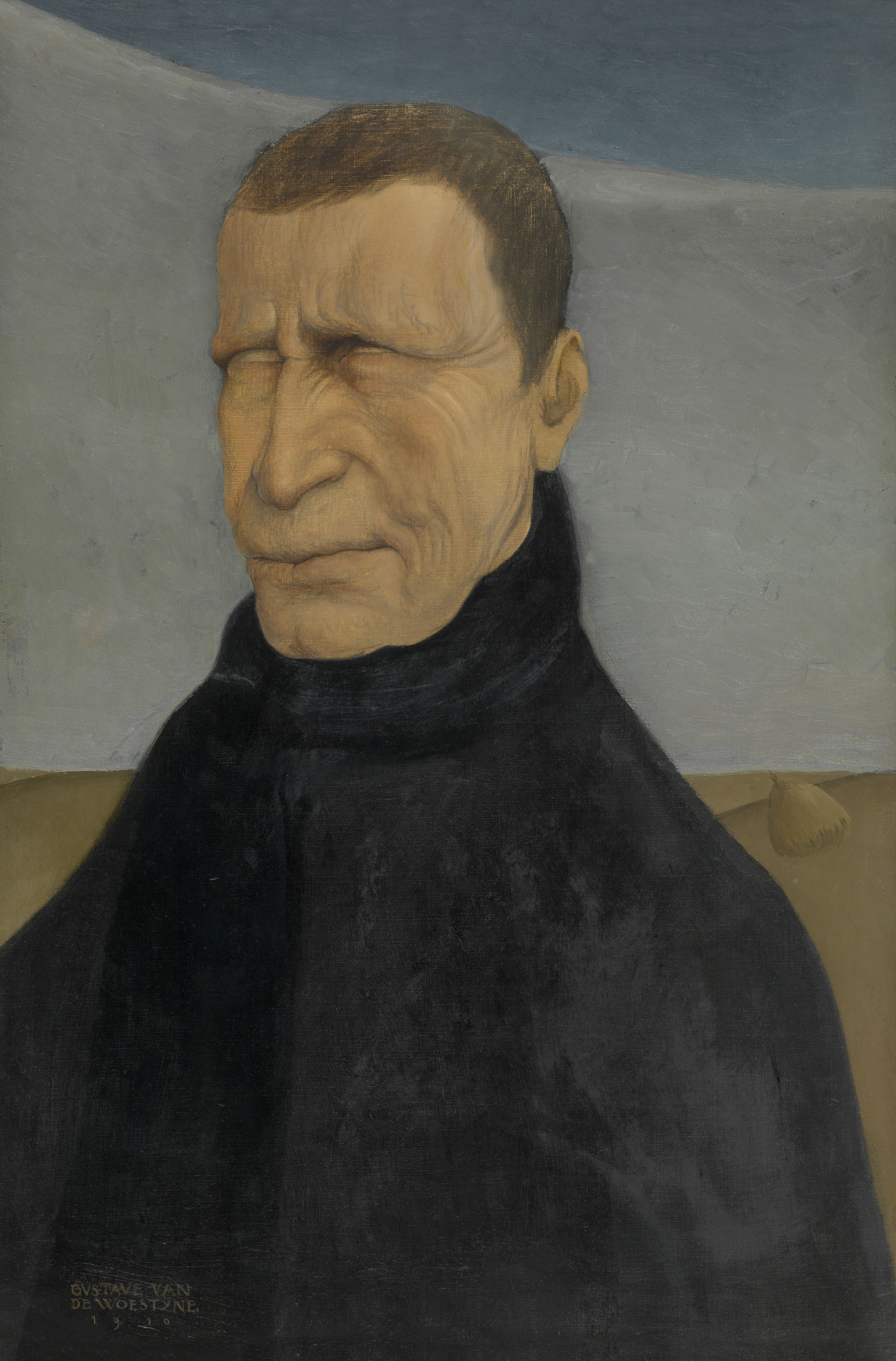
- The Blind Man (1910) by Gustave Van de Woestyne
- Artist: Gustave Van de Woestijne
- Year: 1910
- Medium: Painting

The Blind Man is a 1910 painting by the Flemish artist Gustave Van de Woestijne, now in the Royal Museum for Fine Arts, Antwerp. It is one of a series of portraits of farm workers he produced in Leuven and shows the influence of what were then called the 'Flemish Primitives', such as Rogier van der Weyden's Portrait of Philip van Croy.
