= George Minne =

Belgian artist and sculptor (1866–1941)

- Georges Minne
- Born: 30 August 1866
- Died: 18 February 1941 (aged 74)
- Occupation: Sculptor

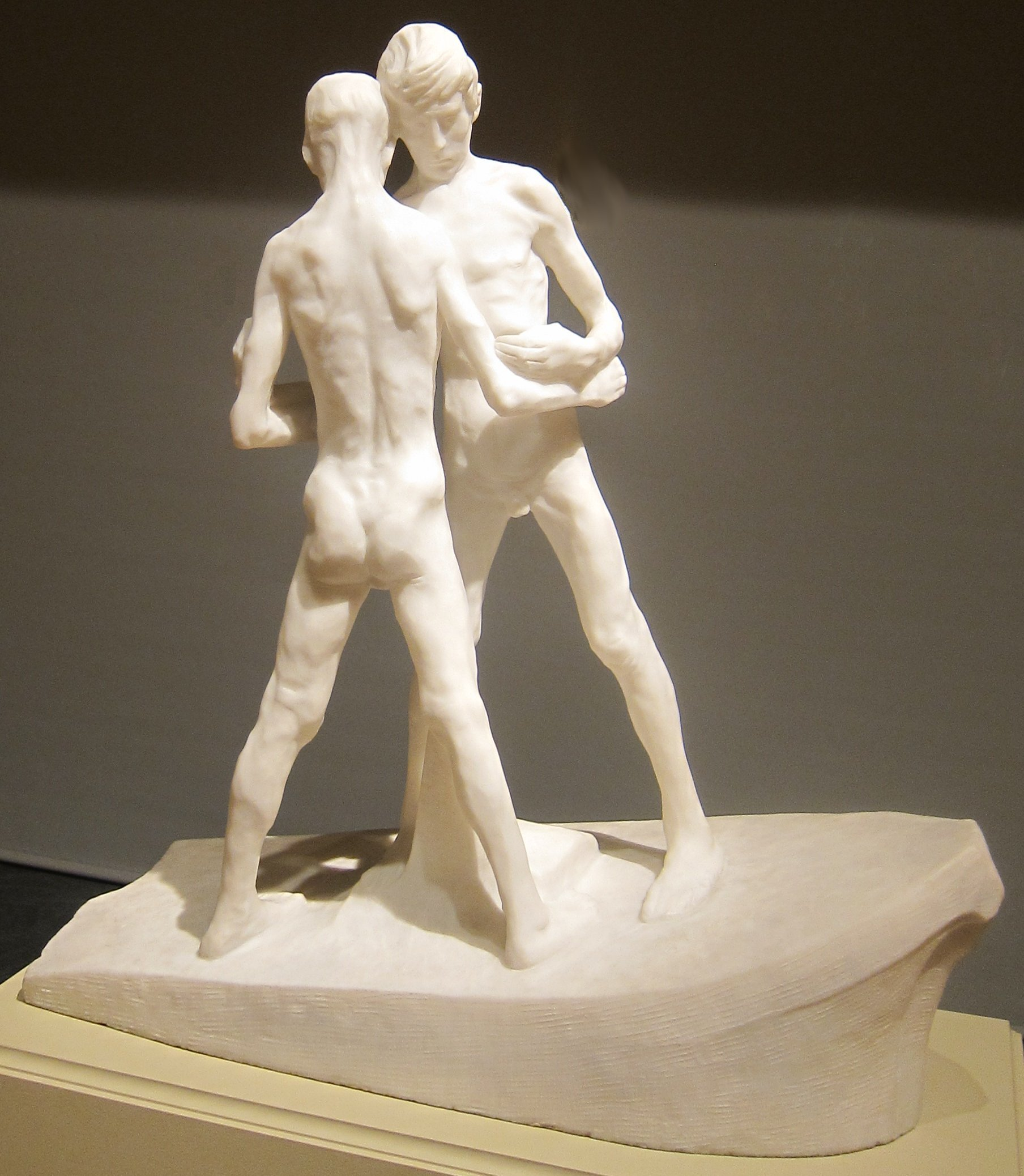
Solidarity

George (Georges) Minne (born Georgius Joannes Leonardus Minne; 30 August 1866 – 18 February 1941) was a Belgian artist and sculptor famous for his idealized depictions of man's inner spiritual conflicts, including the "Kneeling Youth" sculpture series. A contemporary of Gustav Klimt and Egon Schiele, Minne's work shows many similarities in both form and subject matter to the Viennese Secessionists, the fathers of Art Nouveau.

== Life ==
He was born in Ghent, Belgium as the son of an architect (Fredericus Augustus Minne). In 1879, Minne studied painting at the Royal Academy of Fine Arts in Ghent, then in the Académie Royale des Beaux-Arts in Brussels from 1885 through 1889. In 1891 he was elected a member of the arts group Les XX. He had made his first visit to Paris in 1886 where he met the writers Maurice Maeterlinck and Gregore Le Roy, who introduced him to the French Symbolists. Minne returned to Paris in 1890 and asked Auguste Rodin for permission to work in his studio, Rodin told him, "I have nothing to teach you."

In 1892, Minne married Josephine Destanberg, the daughter of a Ghent poet. He then spent most of his time drawing and sculpting. He established his own bronze foundry in 1910–14, in Ghent, which was managed by his son. During World War I he fled to Wales, but returned after the war, and taught drawing.

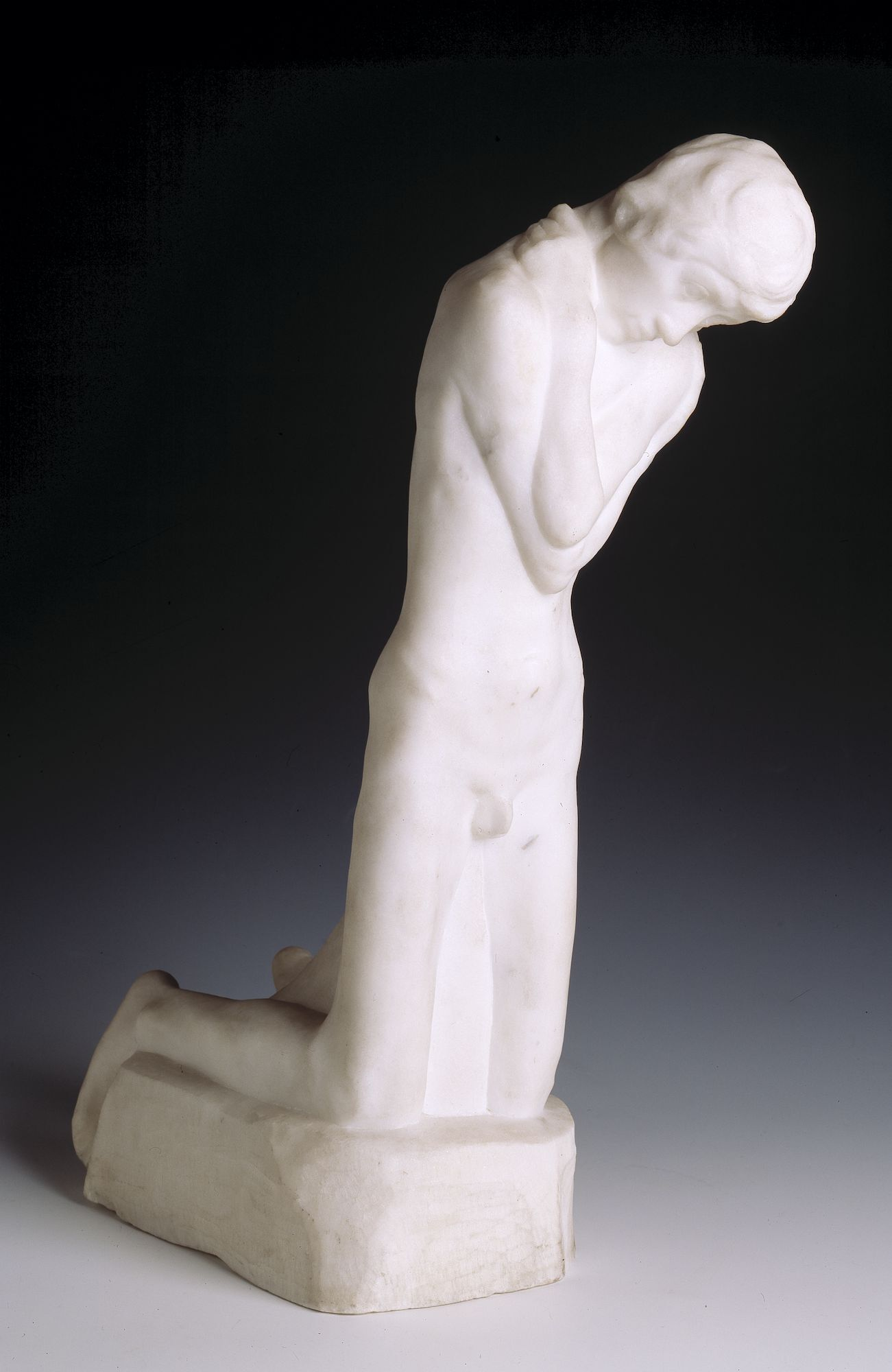
Kneeling youth sculpture in the Museum van Dienze en de Leiestreek, Belgium

== Works ==
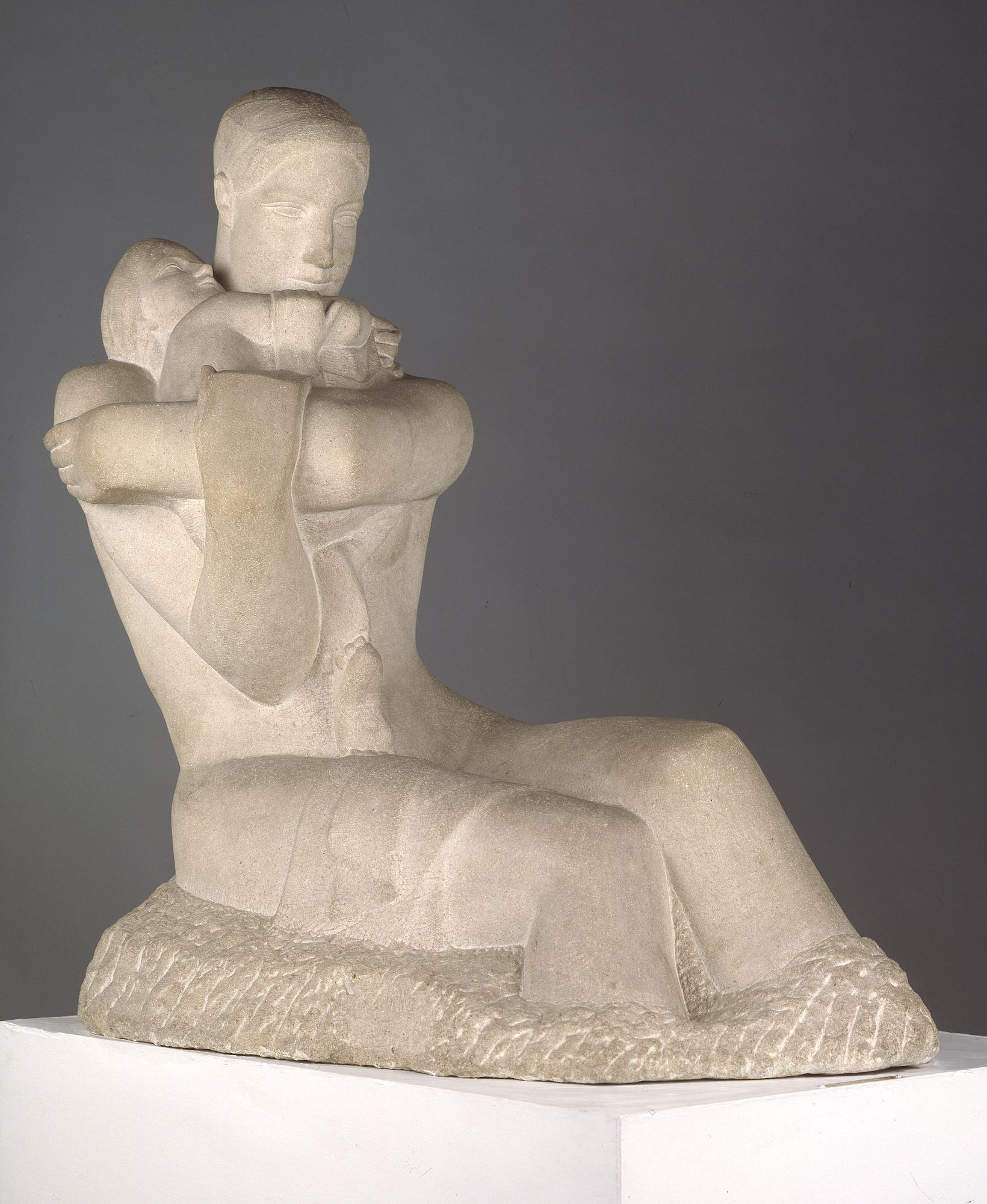
Mother and child in Museum van Deinze en de Leiestreek

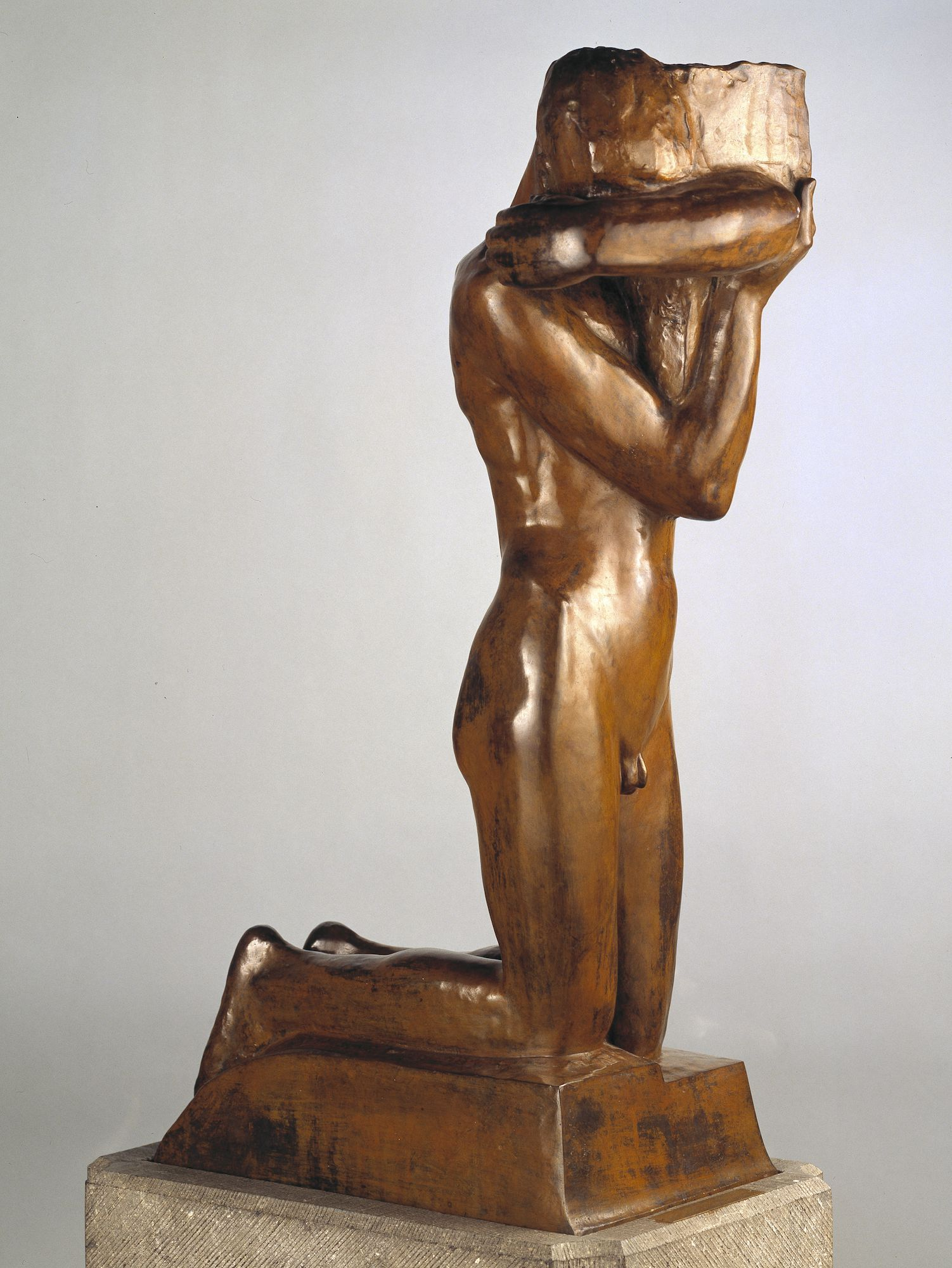
The Great Relic Bearer in Museum van Deinze en de Leiestreek, Belgium

His most famous works are the "Kneeling Youth" series of sculptures, including "The Small Relic Bearer" and "The Fountain of Kneeling Youths", a bronze-cast fountain in his home town of Ghent (the Marble originals are at the Folkwang Museum in Essen, Germany), as well as various smaller sculptures in private and museum holdings, such as the pair of "Kneeling Youths" at the Neue Galerie New York and the plaster of "Kneeling Youth" (1898) acquired in 2011 by the National Gallery of Victoria, Melbourne.

The Neue Galerie's "Kneeling Youth" sculptures were previously owned by Adele Bloch-Bauer and her husband Ferdinand Bloch-Bauer, a wealthy industrialist. The sculptures were confiscated by the Nazis, and only through extensive restitution efforts were they returned to Bloch-Bauer's niece Maria Altmann, and eventually acquired by the museum.

For the Basilica of Koekelberg Minne made the sculpture of the Sacred Heart for the altar in the apse. He also made the bronze Calvary placed outside the basilica.

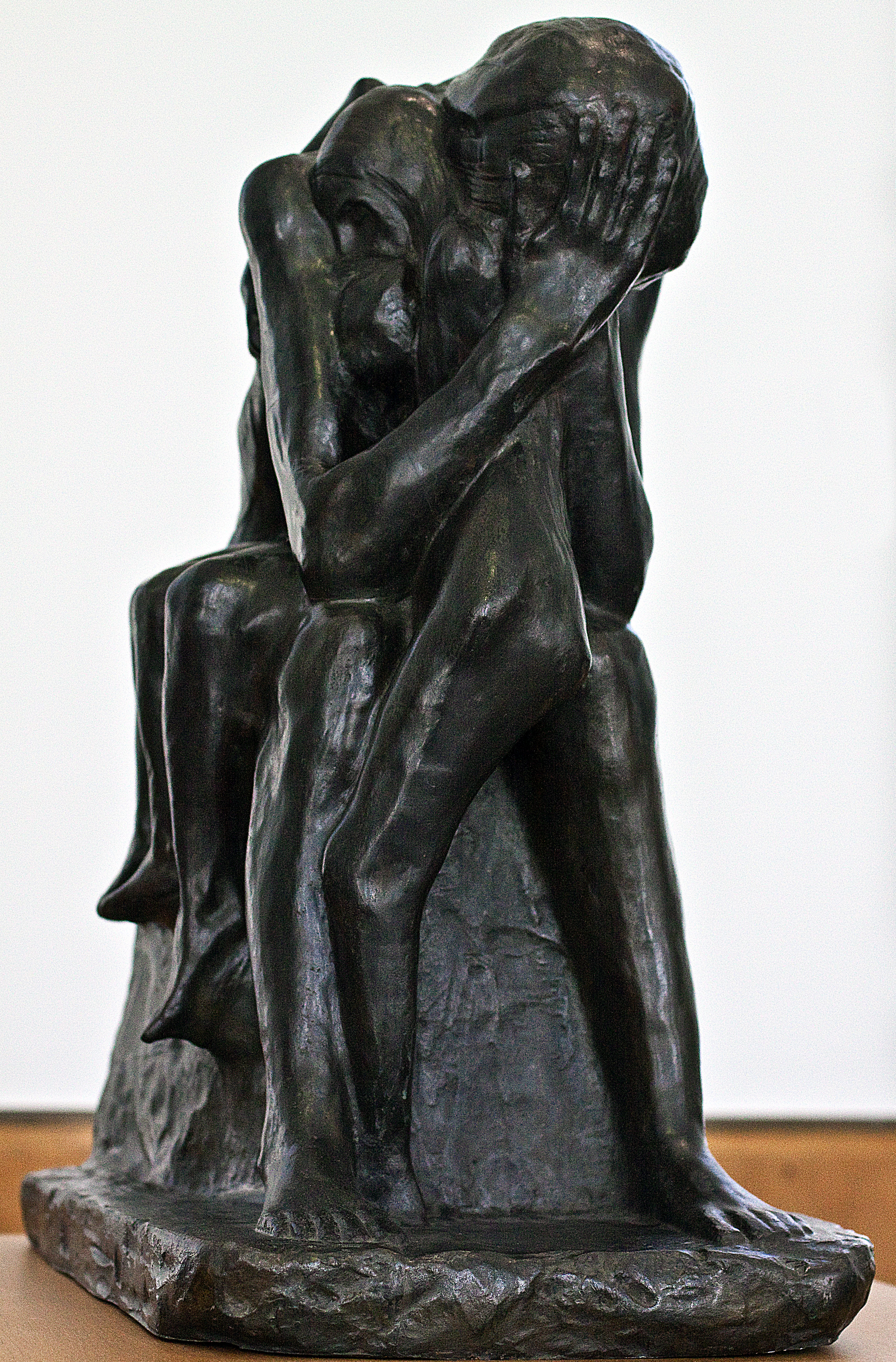
Grieving mother protecting her children

== Honours ==
- 1931 : Created baron by Royal Order of 25 April.
- 1934 : Grand officer in the Order of the Crown.
- Member of the Royal Academy of Science, Letters and Fine Arts of Belgium
