= Maret (name) =

Female given name and family name

Maret is both a French surname and a feminine Estonian given name, cognate to the English name Margaret. Notable people with the name include:

Surname:

- François Maret (1893–1985), Belgian poet, painter, and art critic
- Grégoire Maret (born 1975), Swiss musician
- Henry Maret (1837–1917), French journalist and politician
- Hugues-Bernard Maret, duc de Bassano (1763–1839), French statesman and journalist
- Jean-Baptiste Francois des Marets, marquis de Maillebois (1682–1762), Marshal of France
- Samuel Des Marets (1599–1673), French-Dutch reformed theologian and controversialist

Given name:

- Maret Ani (born 1982), Estonian tennis player
- Maret Balkestein-Grothues (born 1988), Dutch volleyball player
- Märet Jonsdotter (1644–1672), Swedish alleged witch
- Maret Kernumees (1934–1997), Estonian artist
- Maret Maripuu (born 1974), Estonian politician
- Maret Merisaar (born 1958), Estonian biologist and politician
- Maret Olvet (1930–2020) Estonian graphic artist and printmaker
- Maret-Mai Otsa (1931–2020), Estonian basketball player and coach
- Maret G. Traber (born 1950), American biochemist
- Maret Vaher (born 1973), Estonian ski-orienteering competitor

== See also ==
- Marett
