= Traber =

Traber is a German surname meaning "trotter". Trabert is a variant of this surname.

== Notable people ==
Notable people with this surname include:

- Billy Traber, American baseball player
- Falko Traber, German high wire artist
- Ilya Traber, Russian business man
- Jim Traber, American baseball player
- Gregor Traber, German athlete
- Maret G. Traber, American biochemist
- Peter G. Traber, American executive
- Zacharias Traber, Austrian Jesuit
