= Emile Claus =

Belgian painter (1849–1924)

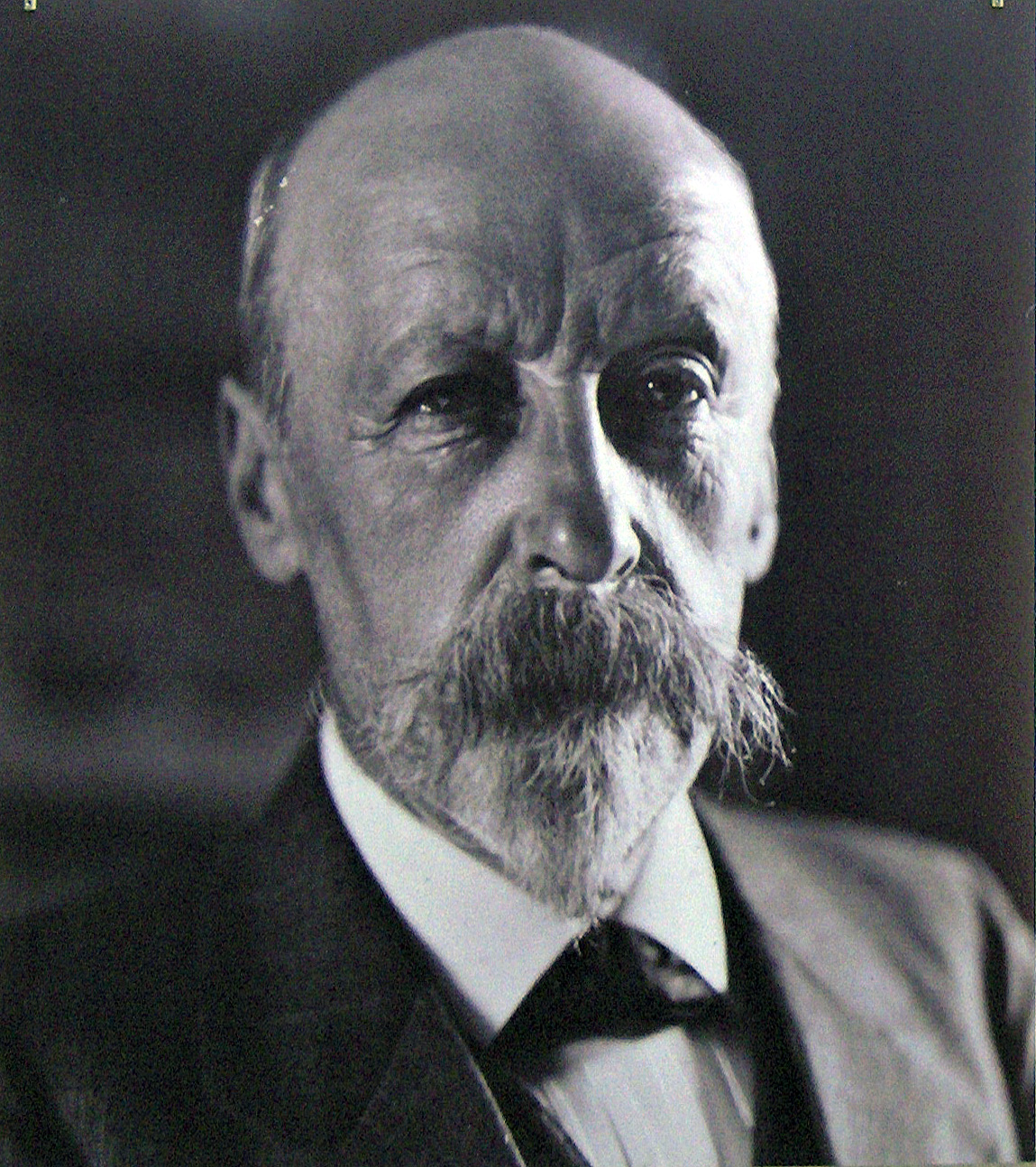
- Self portrait
- Born: Emilme Claus; 27 September 1849; Sint-Eloois-Vijve, Belgium
- Died: 14 May 1924 (aged 74); Astene, Belgium
- Education: Academy of Waregem
- Occupation: Painter
- Parent(s): Alexander and Celestine Verbauwhede

Emile Claus (27 September 1849 – 14 June 1924) was a Belgian painter.

== Life ==
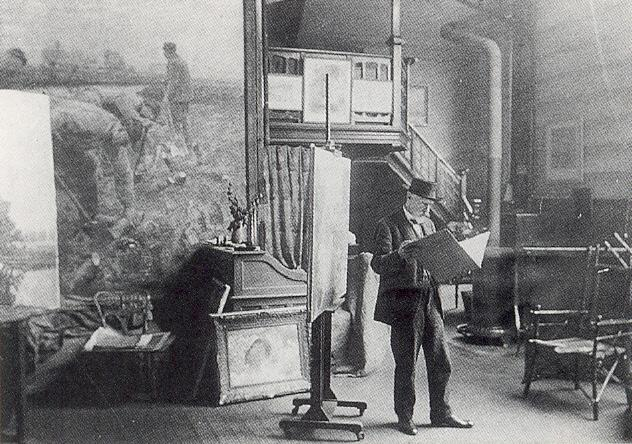
Emile Claus's studio

Emile Claus was born on 27 September 1849, in Sint-Eloois-Vijve, a village in West Flanders (Belgium), at the banks of the river Lys. Emile was the twelfth child in a family of thirteen. Father Alexander was a grocer-publican and for some time town councillor. Mother Celestine Verbauwhede came from a Brabant skipper's family and had her hands full with her offspring.

As a child, Emile already loved drawing and on Sunday went three kilometres on foot to the Academy of Waregem (the neighbouring town) to learn how to draw. He graduated from the Academy with a gold medal. Although father Claus allowed him to take drawing classes, he did not fancy an artist's career for his son. Instead, he sent Emile as a baker's apprentice to Lille (France). Emile learned French there but the job of a baker clearly did not appeal to him. He also worked for some time with the Belgian Railways and as a representative in the flax trade.

== Studies ==
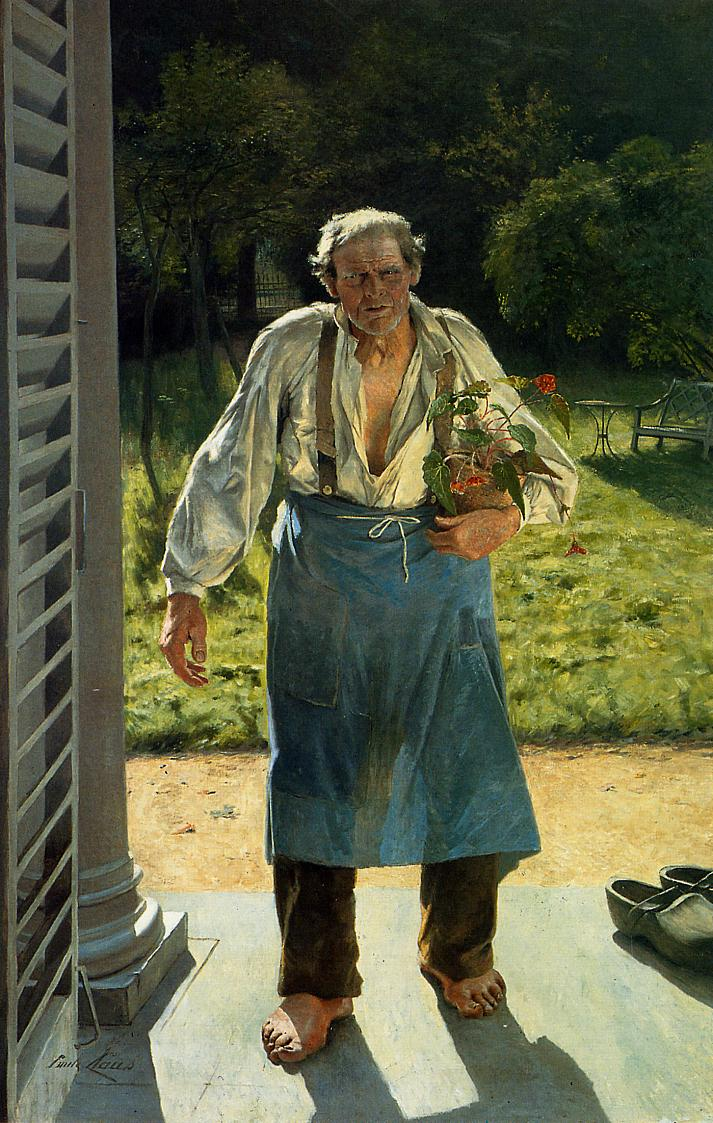
The Old Gardener, 1885

The urge to paint did not let go of Emile and he wrote a letter for help to the famous composer and musician Peter Benoit, who lived in nearby Harelbeke and was an occasional visitor of the family. Only with some effort, Peter Benoit managed to convince father Claus to allow his son to train at the Antwerp Academy of Fine Arts. Claus did have to pay for his studies himself though. After graduating, he stayed to live in Antwerp.

In 1883 Claus moved to cottage Zonneschijn ('Sunshine') in Astene, near Deinze (East Flanders, Belgium), where he stayed until his death. From his living room, he enjoyed a beautiful view across the river Lys. The space and light of the country house clearly inspired him.

Artistically, Claus soon prospered. As a celebrity, he became a friend of the family with amongst others the French sculptor Auguste Rodin and the naturalist Émile Zola, and with the Belgian novelists and poets Cyriel Buysse, Emile Verhaeren, Pol de Mont and Maurice Maeterlinck. He travelled around the world to attend exhibitions of his work.

An important person in the life of Emile Claus was the painter Jenny Montigny. She followed master classes at his workshop in Astene and for years travelled back and forth between Ghent and Astene. Although Claus was 26 years older than she was, they began a relationship that would last until Claus' death. Another of his private students was the Belgian artist Anna De Weert. She, and her husband Maurice De Weert, spent summers with him in the 1890s.

The First World War interrupted Claus' international success. He fled to London where he found a house and workshop at the banks of the river Thames. He returned in 1918.

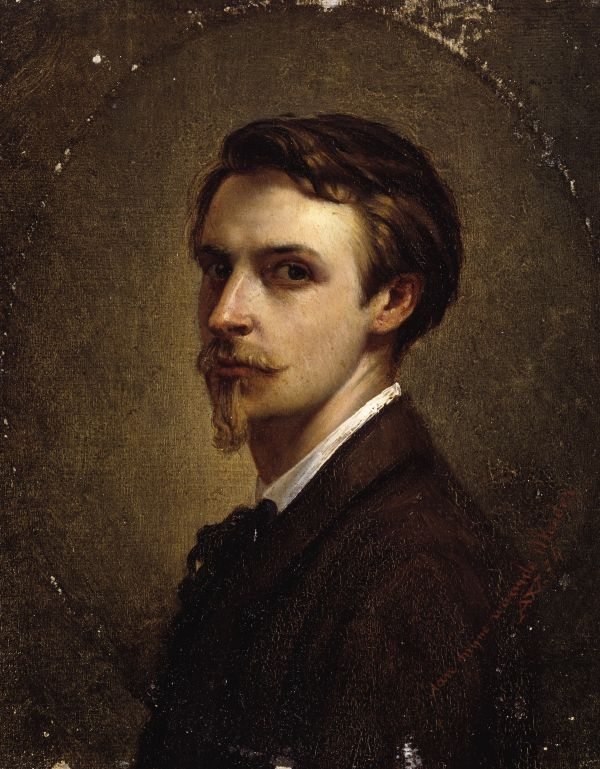
Emile Claus as a young man, self-portrait

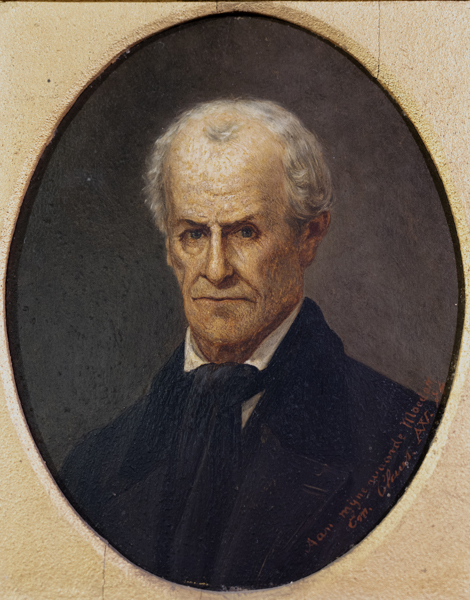
father Alexander Claus, painted by the artist

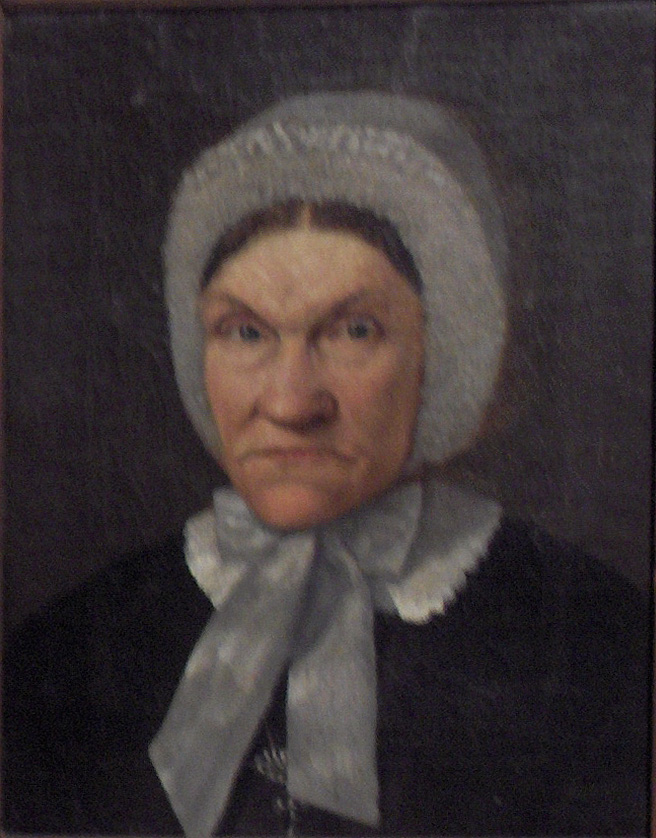
mother Celestine Verbauwhede, painted by the artist

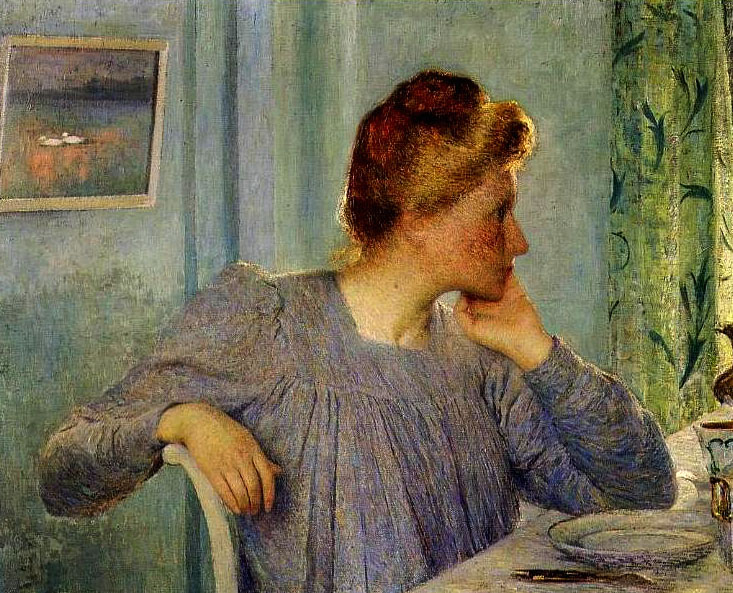
Charlotte Dufaux or Madame Claus, the painter's wife, 1900

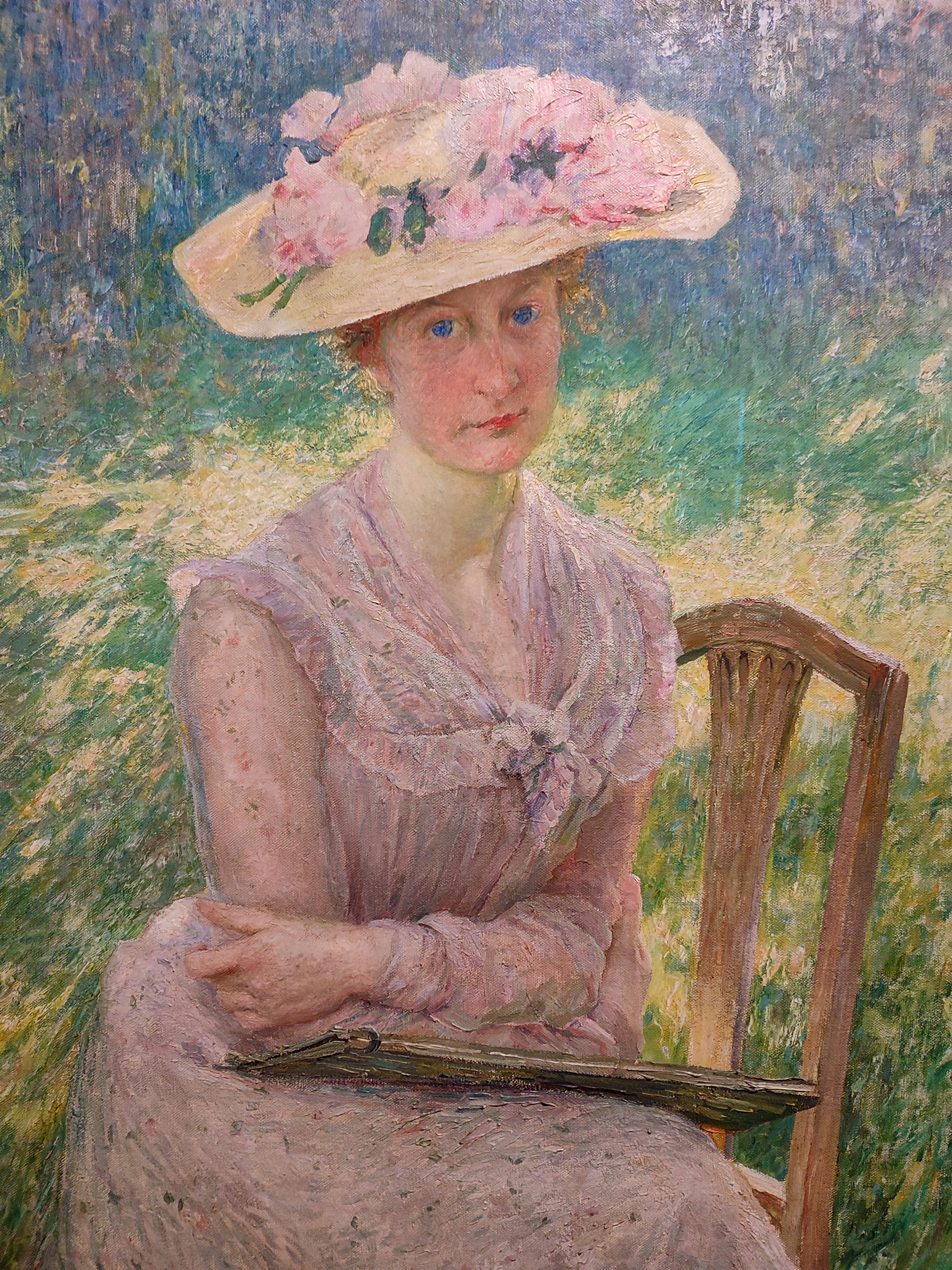
Jenny Montigny, 1902 painted by the artist

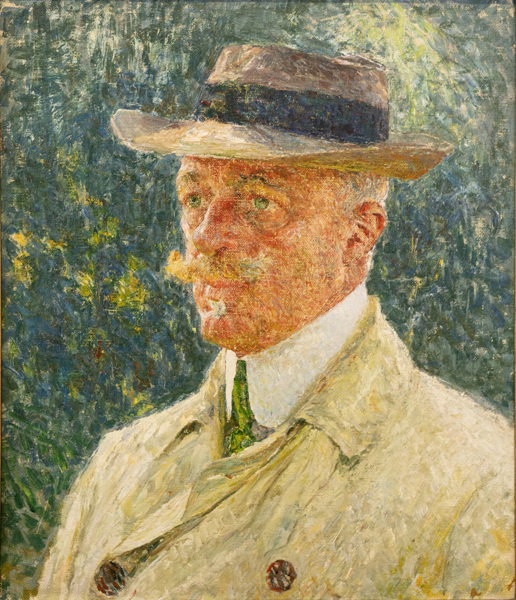
Portrait of Cyriel Buysse painted by the artist

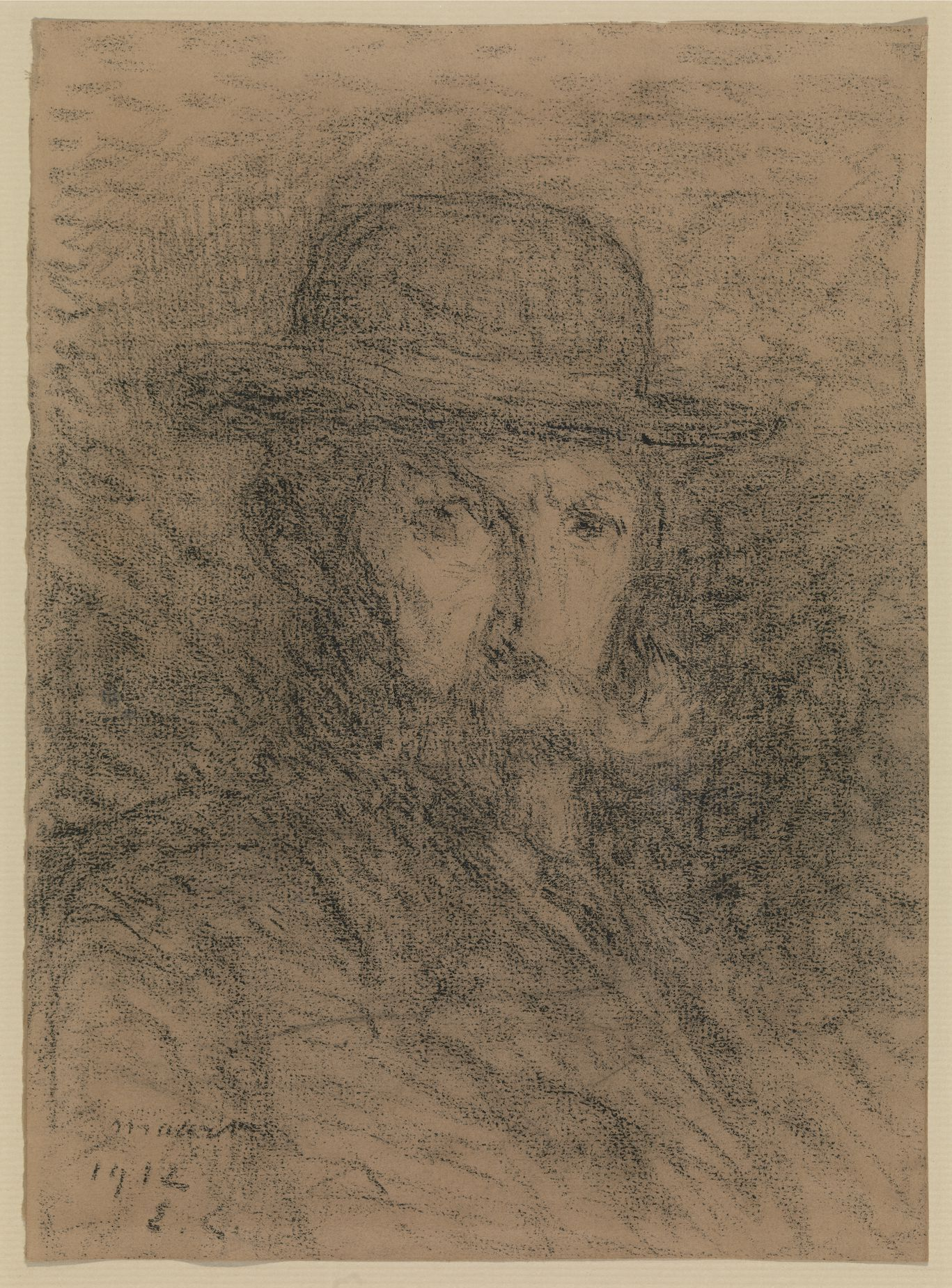
Self portrait of Emile Claus

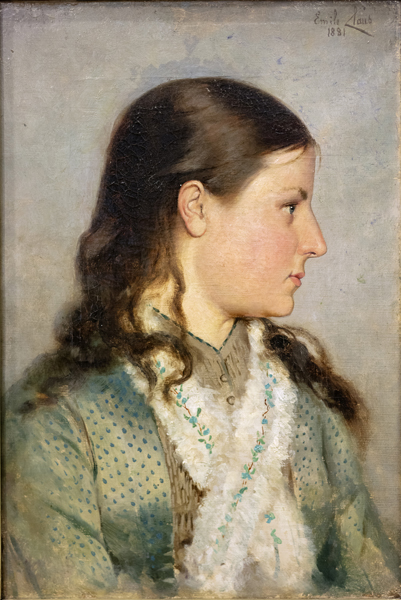
Portrait of Charlotte Dufaux painted by the artist

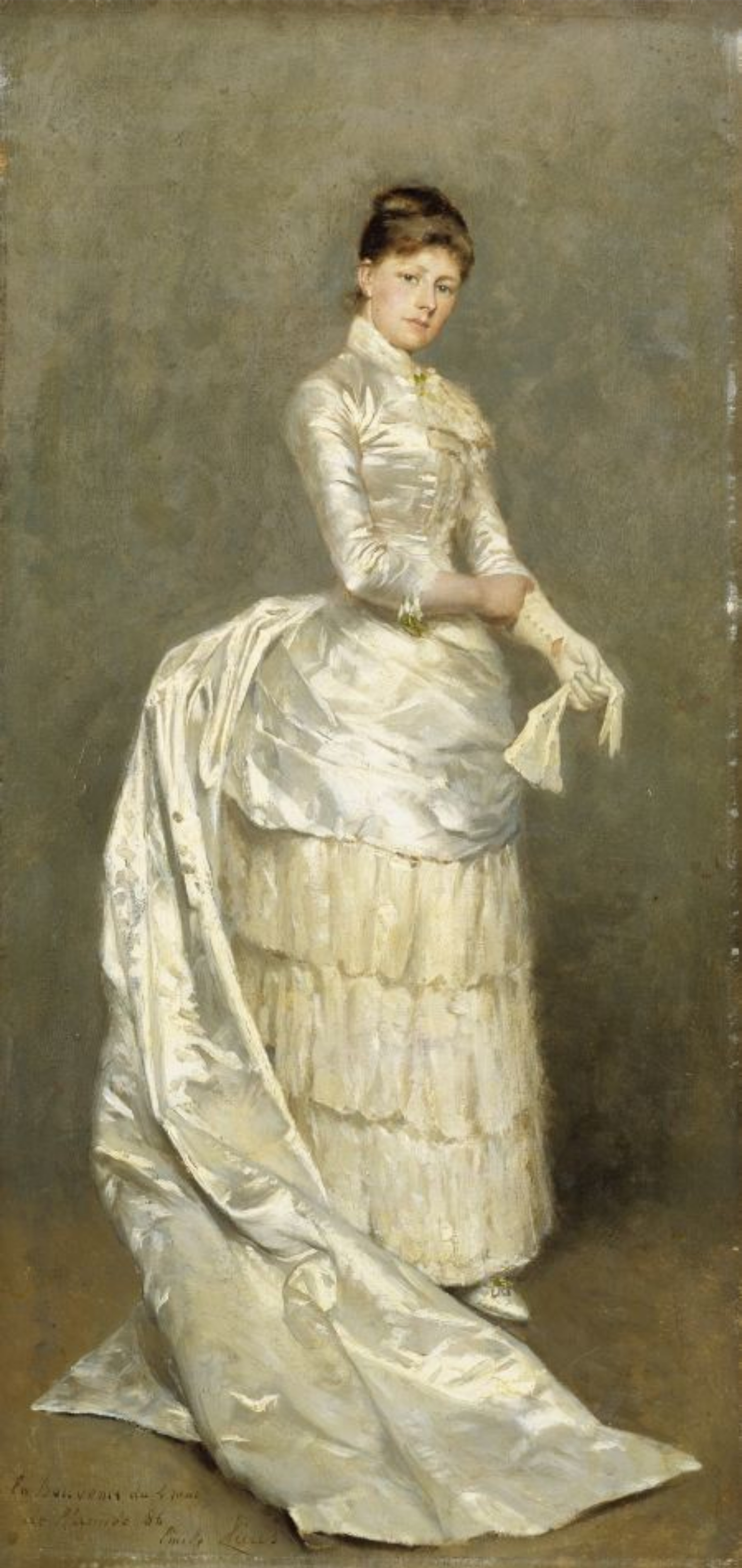
Portrait of Mrs Claus with wedding dress painted by the artist

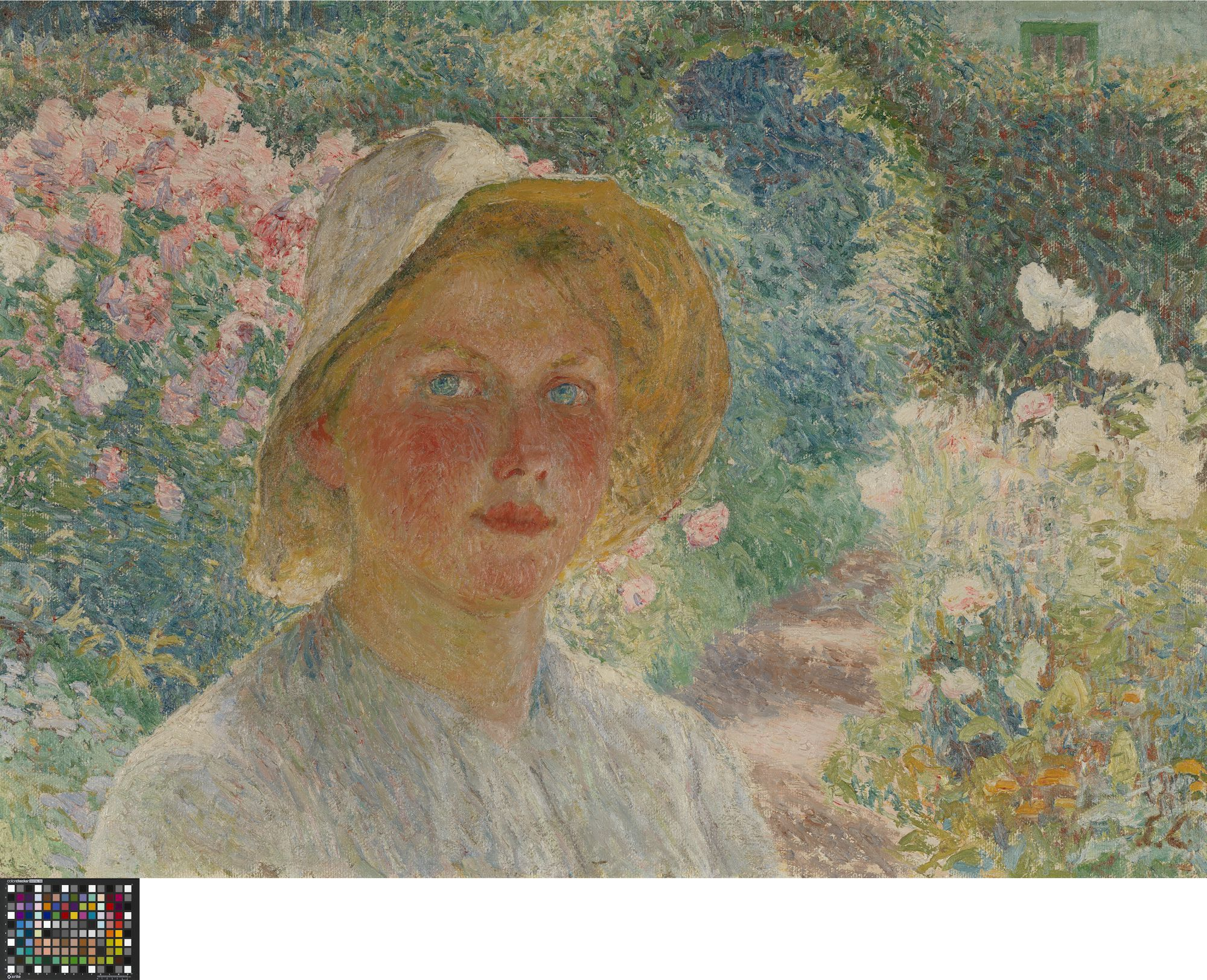
Daughter of the gardener

== Career ==
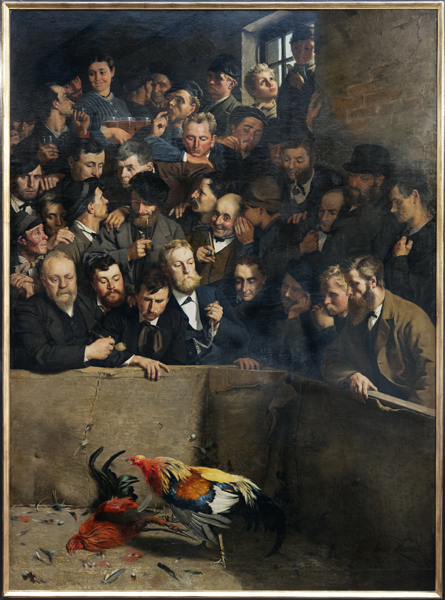
The Cock Fight (1882)

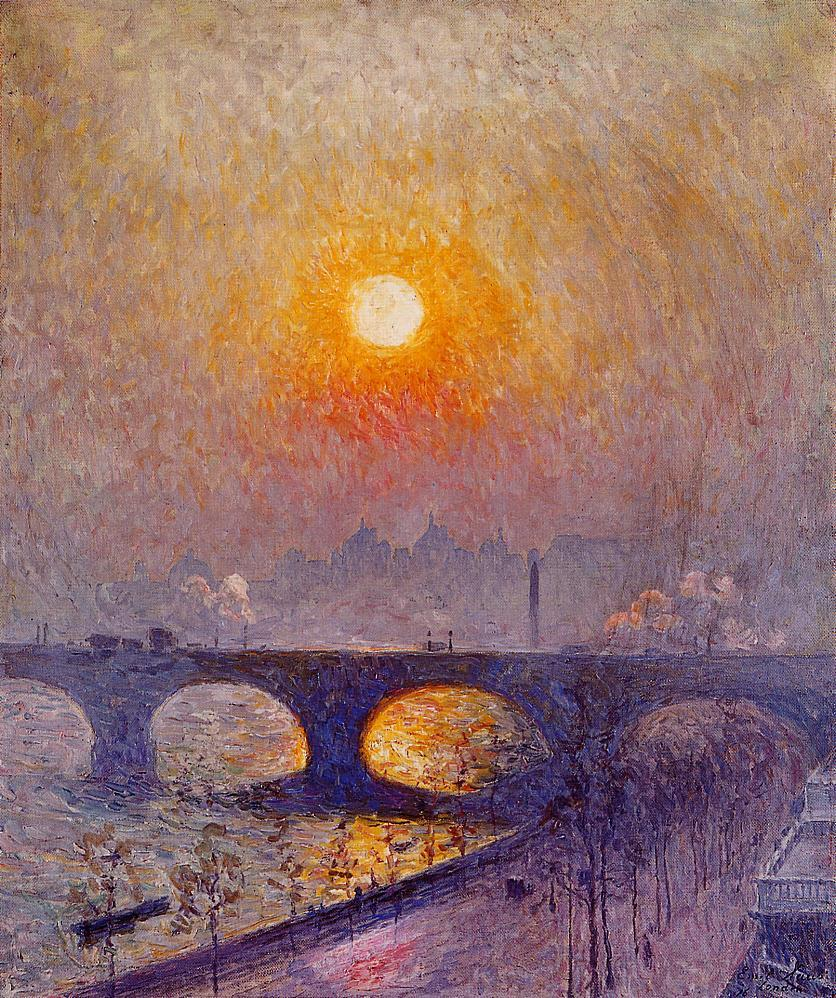
Sunset over Waterloo Bridge (1916)

From 1869 to 1874, Claus trained at the Antwerp Academy of Fine Arts with, amongst others, the landscape painter Jacob Jacobs. During his training, Claus attracted the attention of and found favour with the local upper middle class.

In 1882 Claus had completed Cock Fight in Flanders, The realistic painting portrays the dignitaries of Waregem, collected around a small arena with two fighting roosters.

One of the dignitaries was the Waregem notary Eduard Dufaux. At the notary's home, Emile got to know Eduard's niece Charlotte Dufaux. They got married in 1886.

Artistically and financially, Claus soon prospered. The Antwerp Museum of Fine Arts purchased one of his works, and The Picnic (1887), his well-known painting showing a farmer's family watching the Sunday outing of the urban bourgeoisie on the opposite bank of a small river (the Lys), was bought by the Belgian royal family.

Under the influence of Claude Monet, he developed a style that has been characterized as luminism. In 1904, he started the artist group Vie et Lumière ('Life and Light').

In 1918, at his return from London after World War I and with the dawn of expressionism, Claus found his fame diminished. In 1921, he was given a last survey exhibition in Brussels, where especially his London works (about the city and the river Thames) made a positive impression on the public.

== Art ==
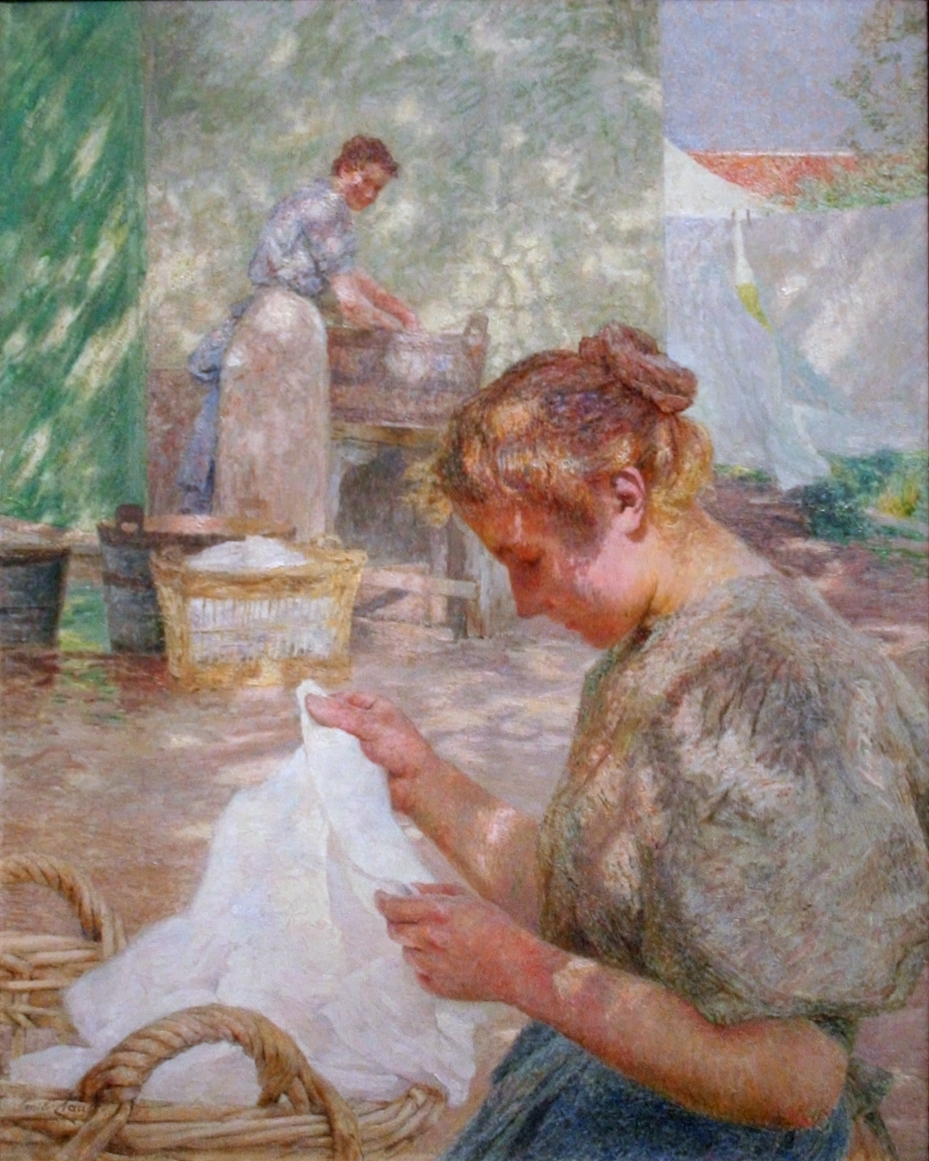
Sunny Day

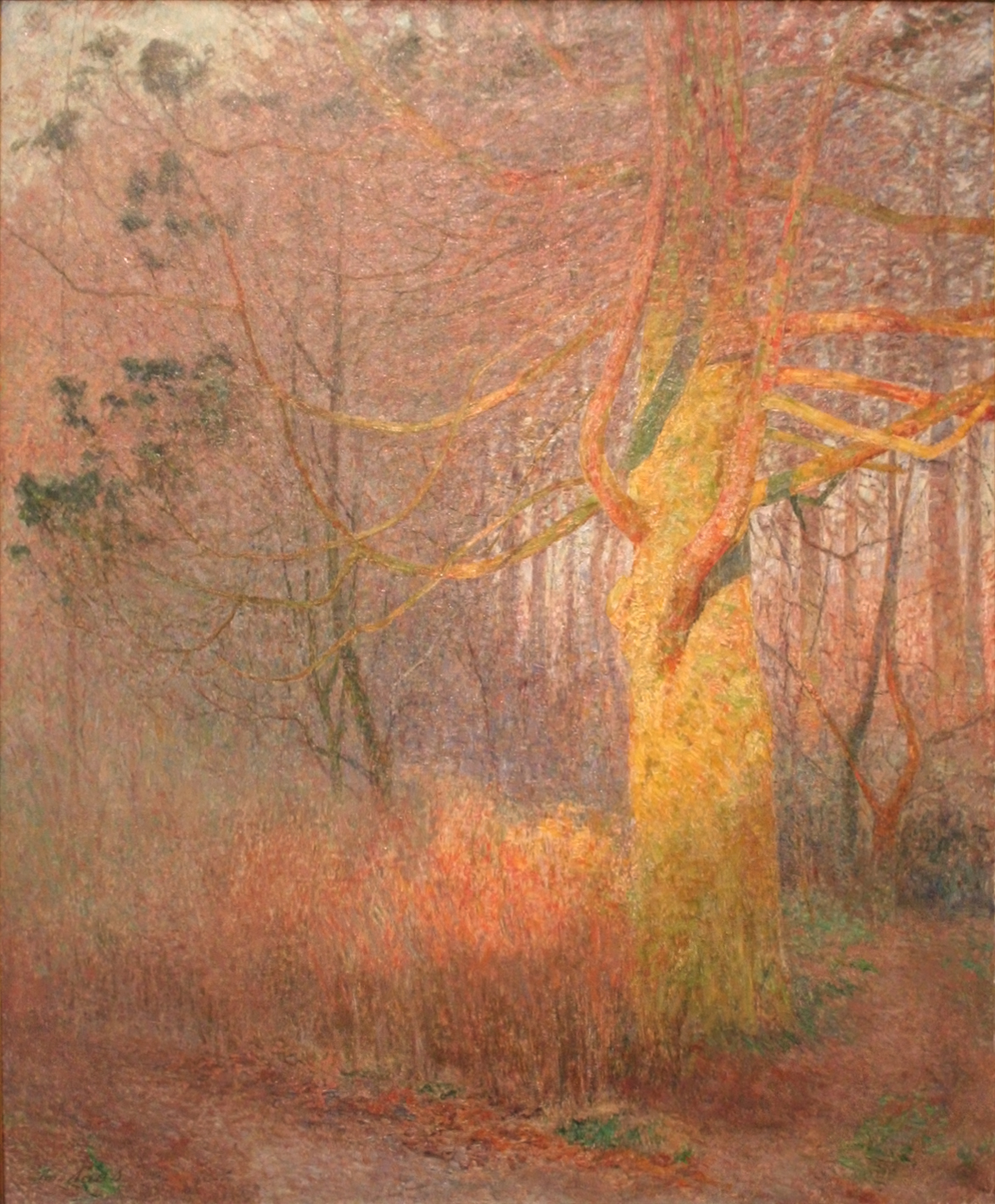
Tree in the Sun

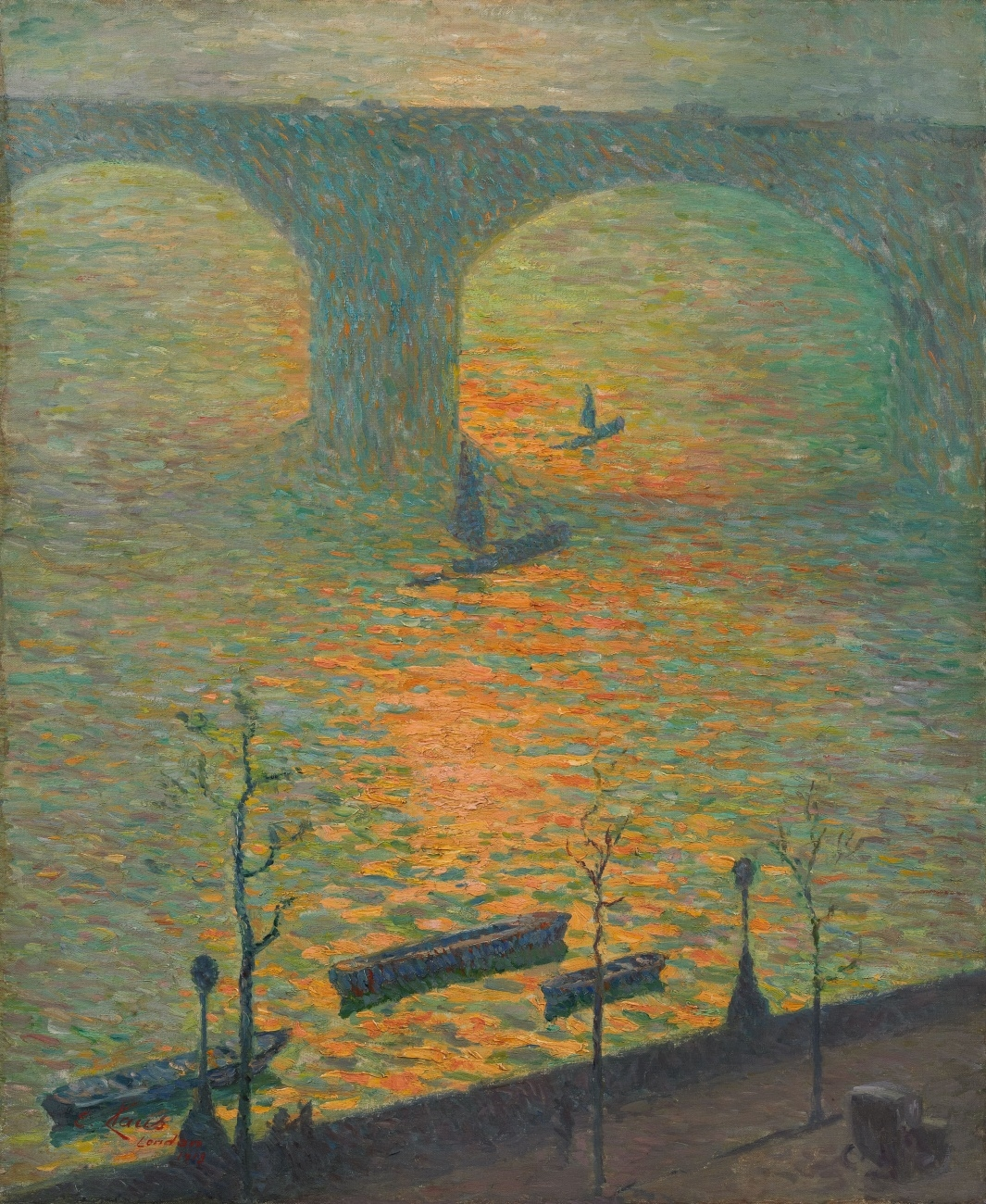
London Waterloo Bridge 1918

During his years in Antwerp, Claus mainly painted portraits and realistic, anecdotal genre pieces.

Stimulated by his friend, the author Camille Lemonnier, and influenced by the French impressionists, like Claude Monet whose works he got to know during his trips to Paris in the 1890s, Claus gradually shifted from naturalistic realism to a very personal style of impressionism called 'luminism', because of the luminous palette he used.

His paintings The Beet Harvest (1890) and The Ice Birds (1891) represent important turning points in this evolution.

The Beet Harvest shows farmers harvesting sugar beets, hacking them out of the frozen field. The painting is gigantic in size and hangs at the Museum of Deinze and de Leiestreek in Deinze, Belgium. Claus never sold it and after his death, his widow donated it to the city of Deinze on the condition they built a museum to exhibit it. The painting can now indeed be found at the Museum van Deinze en de Leiestreek (museum of Deinze and the Lys area') in Deinze (Belgium).

The Ice Birds (1891) shows an icy landscape with playing children. The painting was inspired by the novella of the same title by the Waregem novelist Léonce Ducatillon. The naturalistic story is set at the Keukelmeersen ('keukel meadows'), a swampy area with dips, drains, ditches and trenches near the centre of Waregem.

Every winter, it got flooded and changed into a wide icy plain. At the end of the story, one of the poor hungry boys falls through the ice while trying to pull out a frozen fish, and drowns. The painting is now part of the permanent collection of the Museum of Fine Arts in Ghent (Belgium).

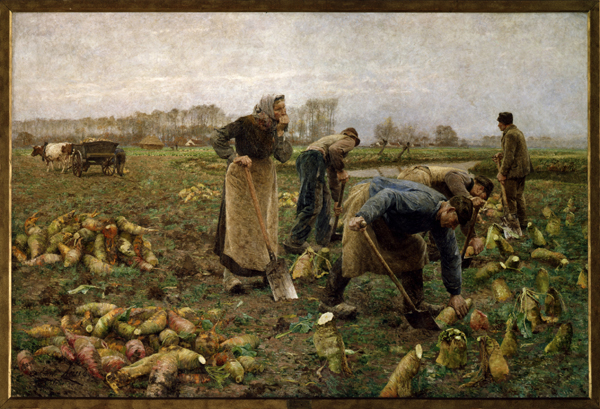
The Beet Harvest in Museum van Deinze en de Leiestreek

Claus is considered to be the pioneer of Belgian luminism. In 1904, he founded the society Vie et Lumière ('life and light') and became known as the 'sun painter' and the 'painter of the Lys'. A magnificent example is his painting Cows crossing the Lys (1899), which shows a group of motley cows being herded across a small river, with sunlights reflecting off the moving water. The painting hangs in the Royal Museum of Fine Arts in Brussels (Belgium).

During the First World War, while in exile in London, he painted a series of views on the river Thames, known as "reflections on the Thames", in the style of Monet. They are his most traditional impressionist works. On 14 June 1924, Claus died in Astene. His last words were: "Bloemen, bloemen, bloemen …” ('Flowers, flowers, flowers'). The day before his death, he had painted a pastel of a bouquet of flowers, sent to him by Queen Elisabeth of Belgium. Claus is buried in his own garden in Astene and a street is named after him in Brussels.

== Honours ==
- 1911 : Member of the Royal Academy of Science, Letters and Fine Arts of Belgium.^{,}
- 1919 : Commander of the Order of Leopold.

== Works ==
Other well-known works by Emile Claus include:

Paintings

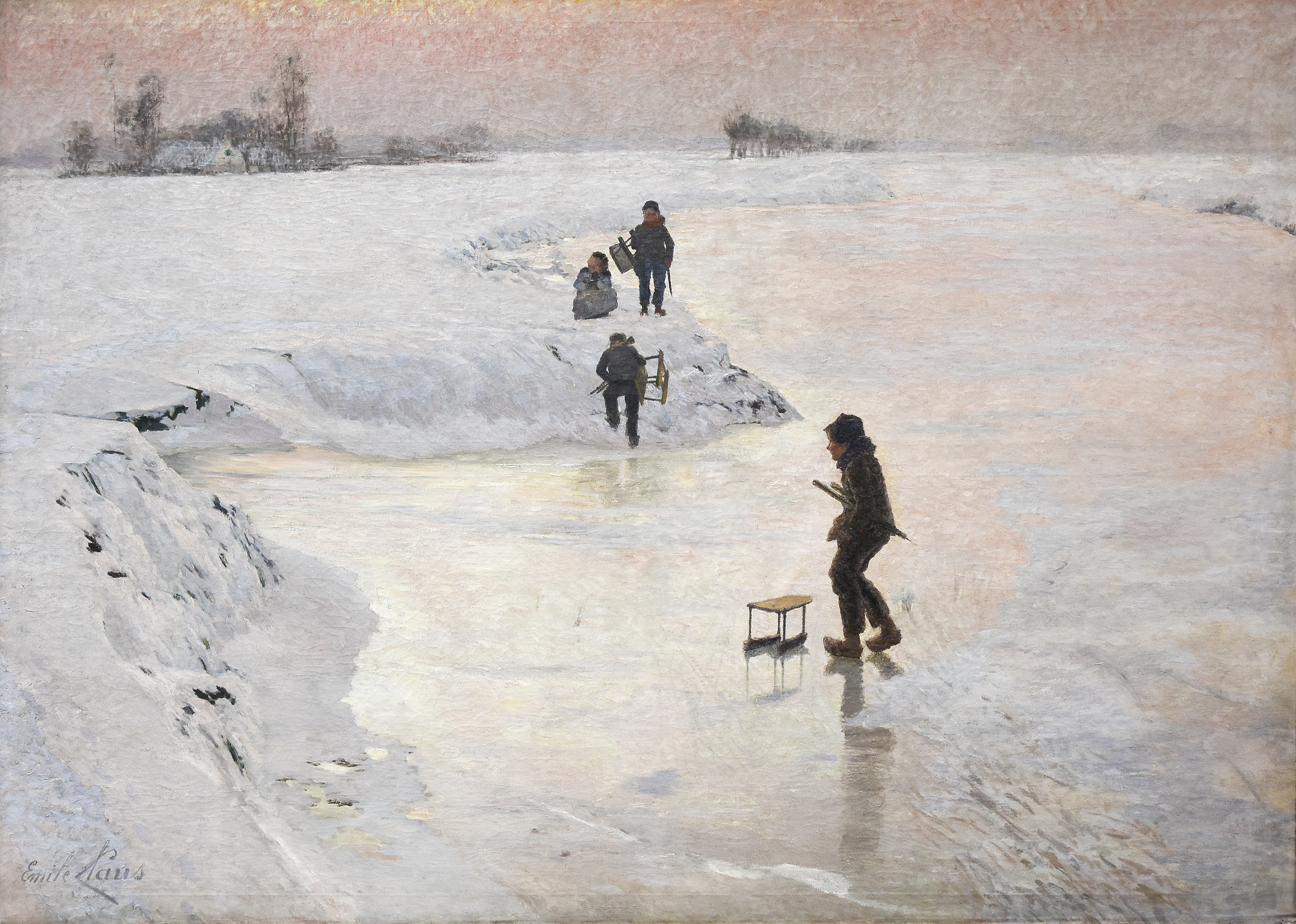
The Ice Birds

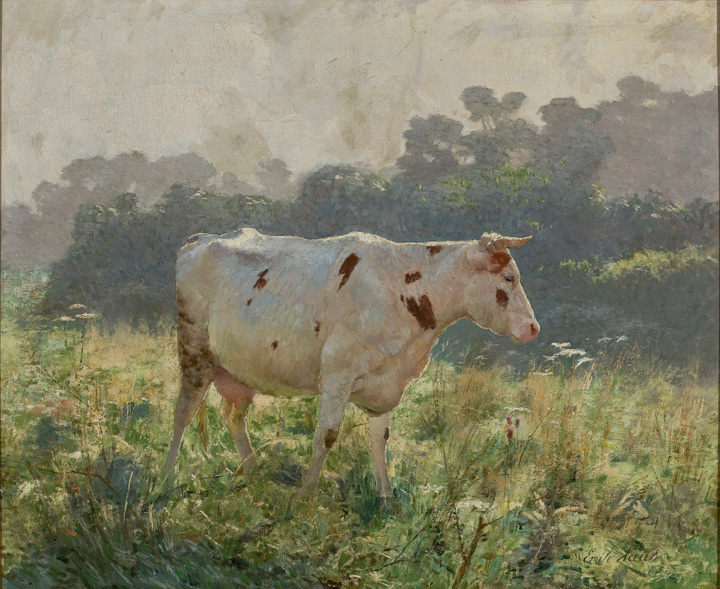
Cow

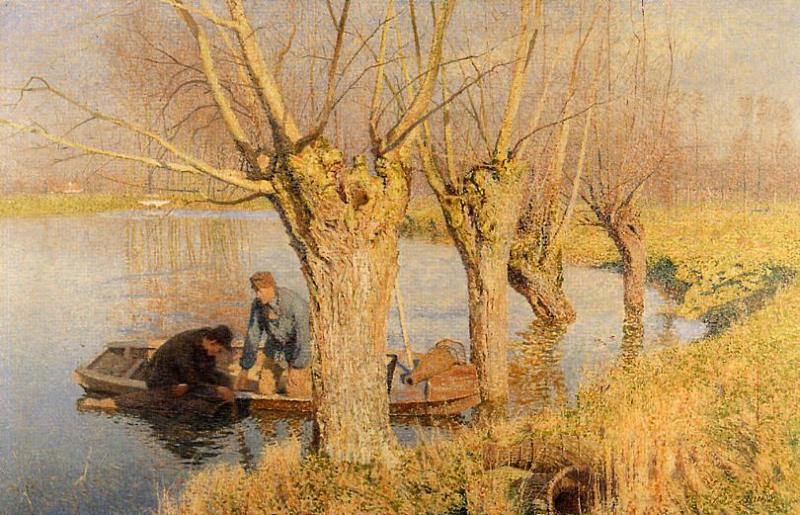
Bringing in the Nets, 1893

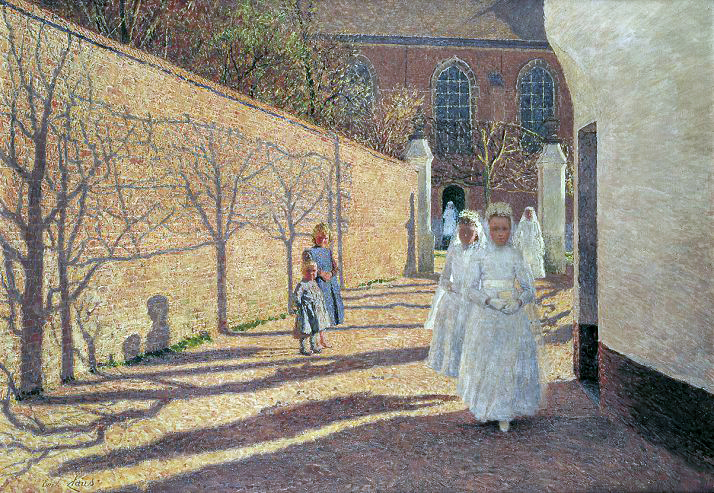
First Communion, 1893

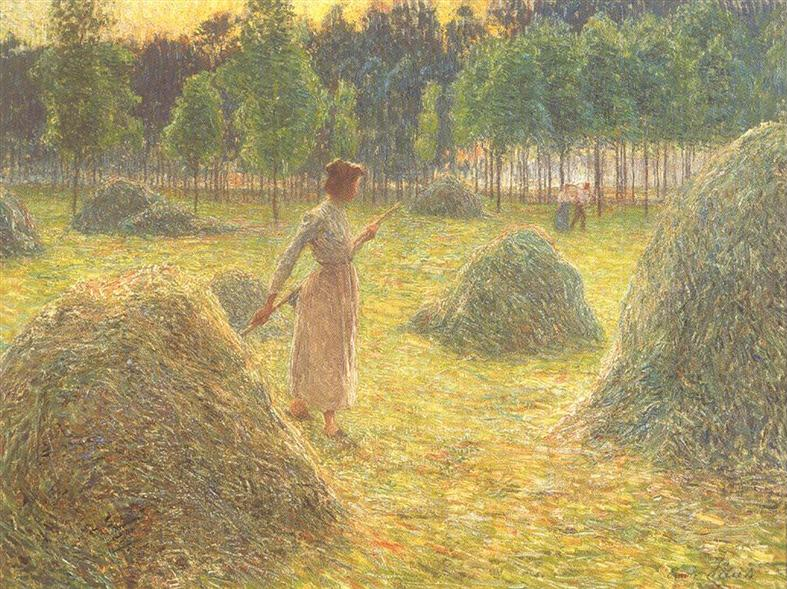
Hay stacks, 1905

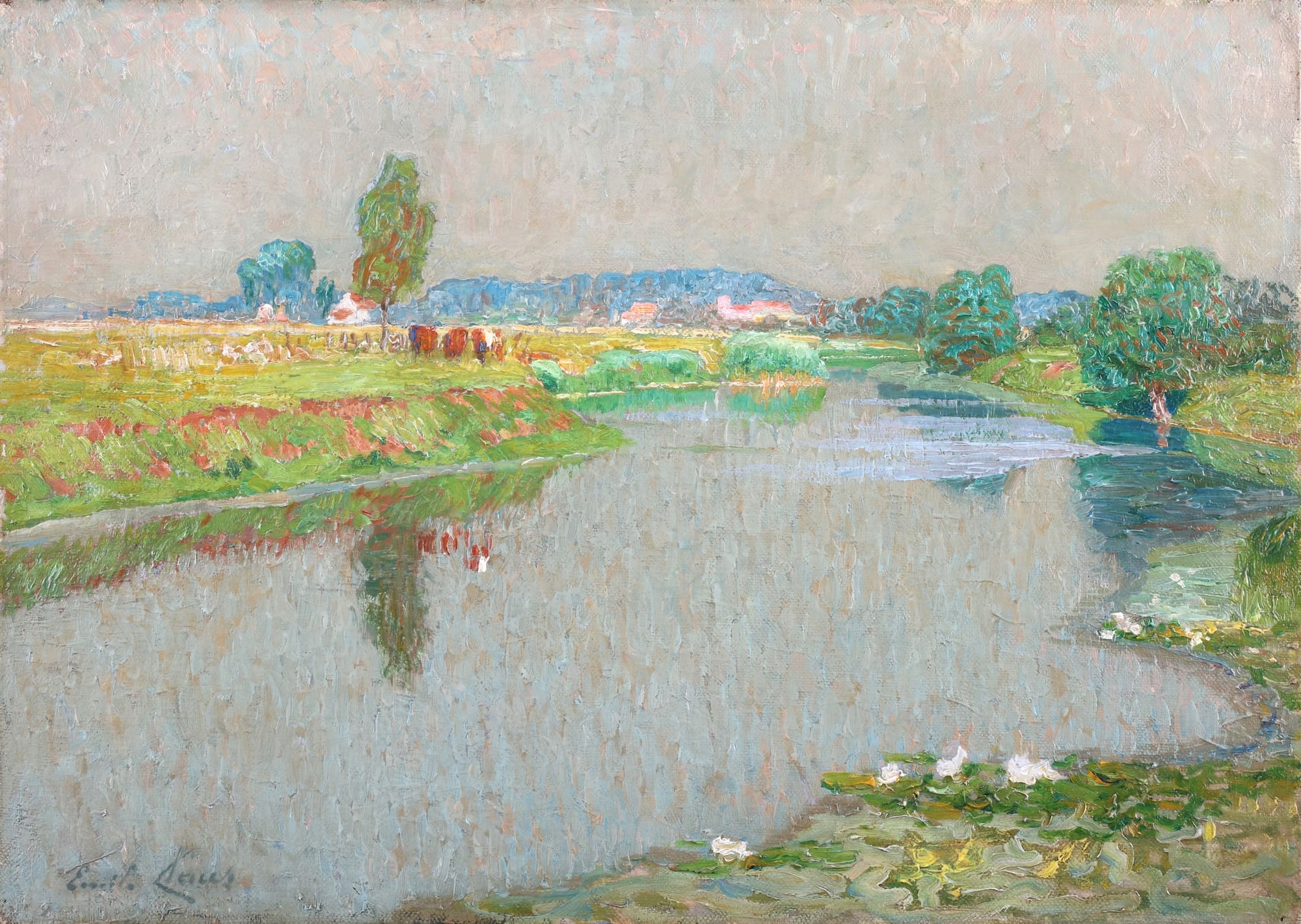
De Leie, 1912

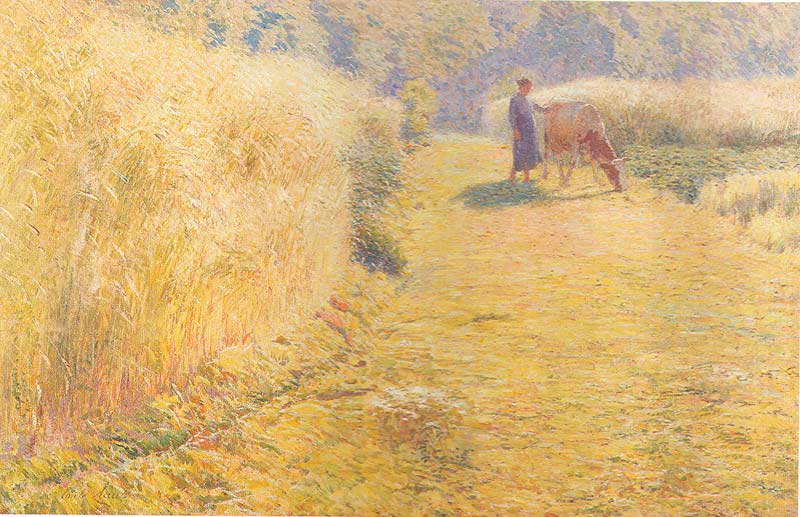
Summer

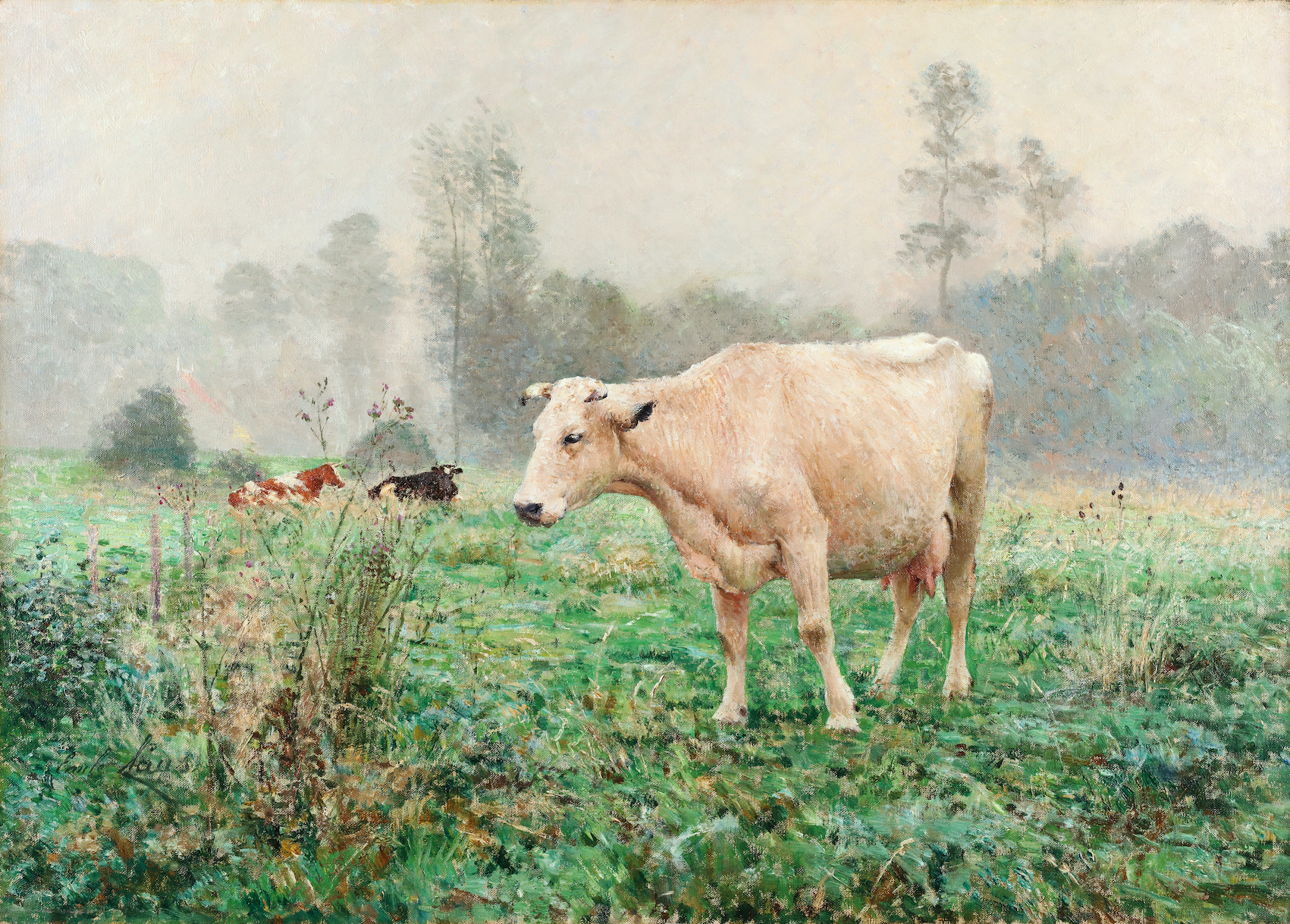
Cows in the meadow

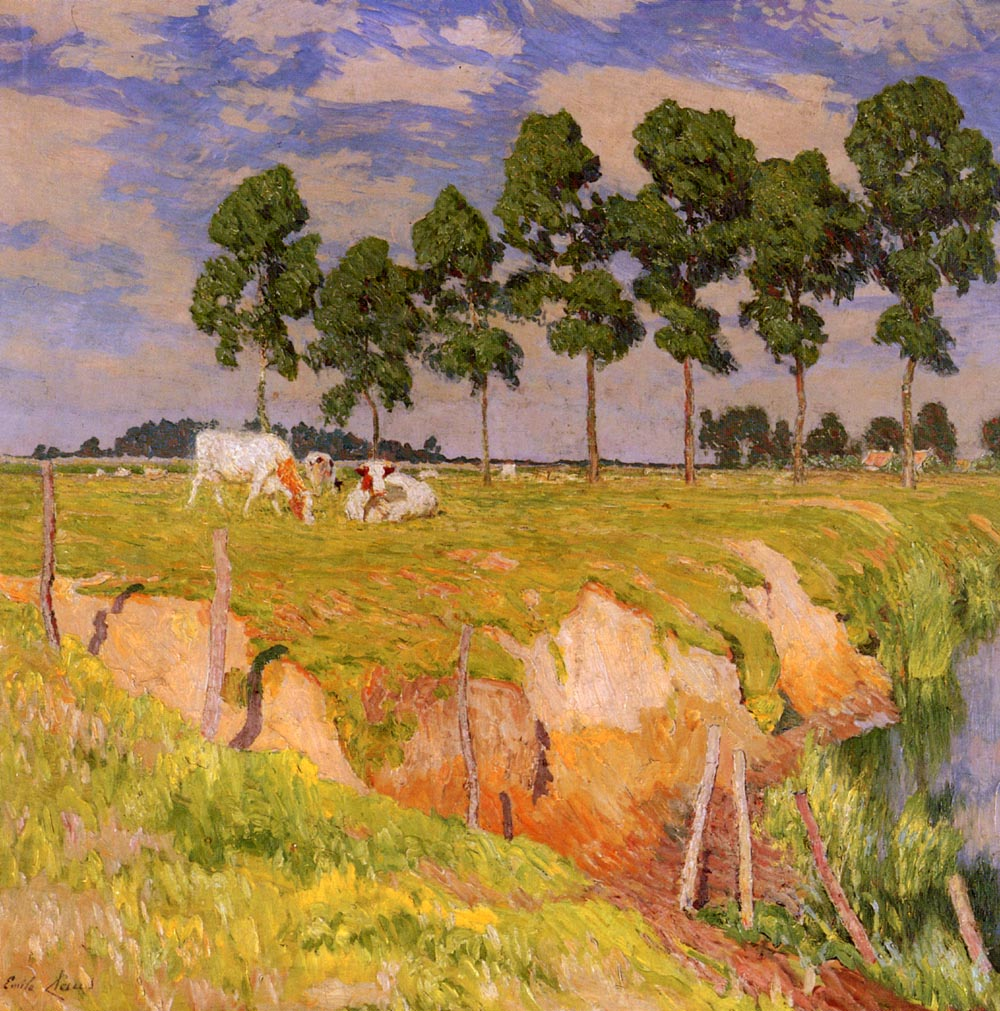
The caving in bank

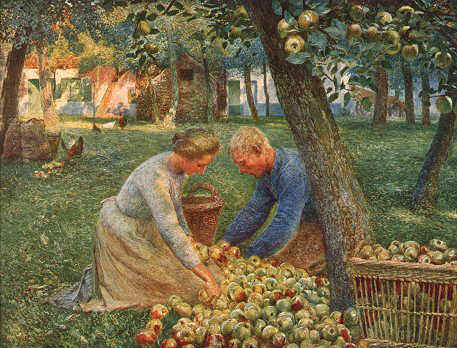
Orchard in Flanders

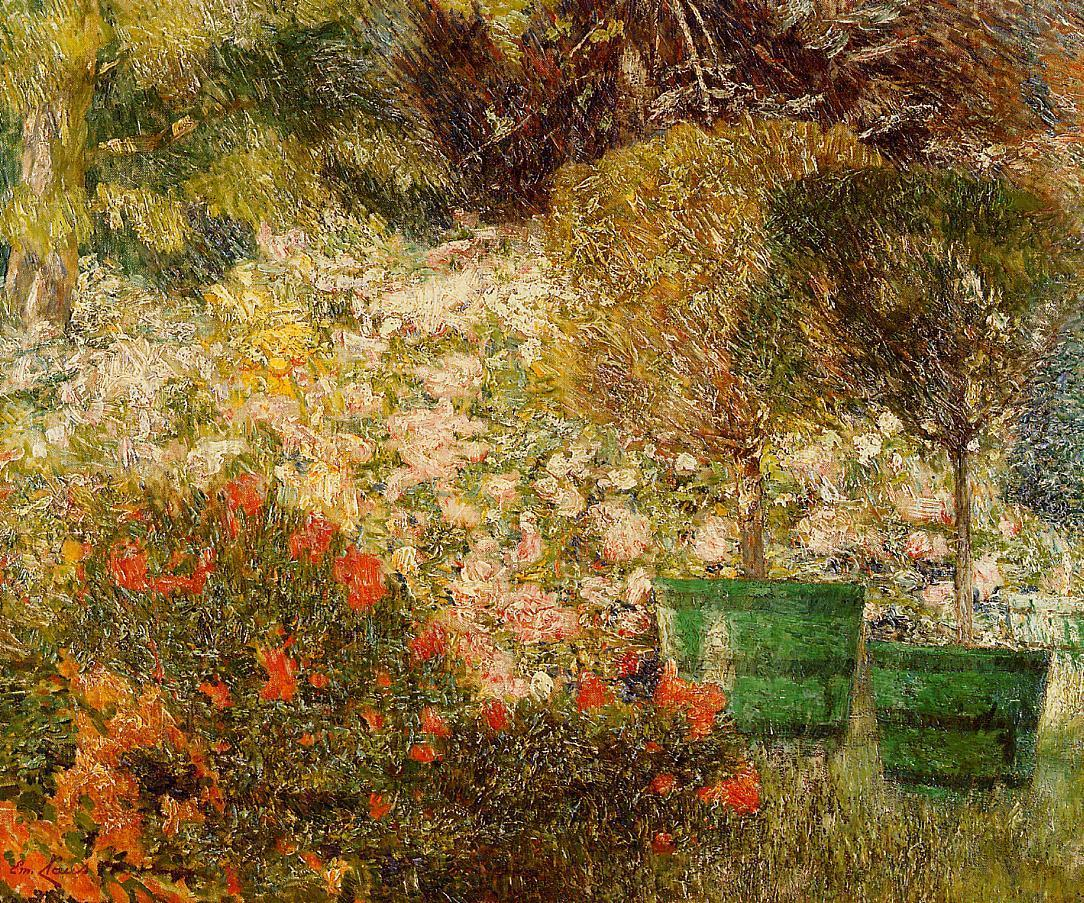
A Corner of My Garden (Emile Claus, 1904)

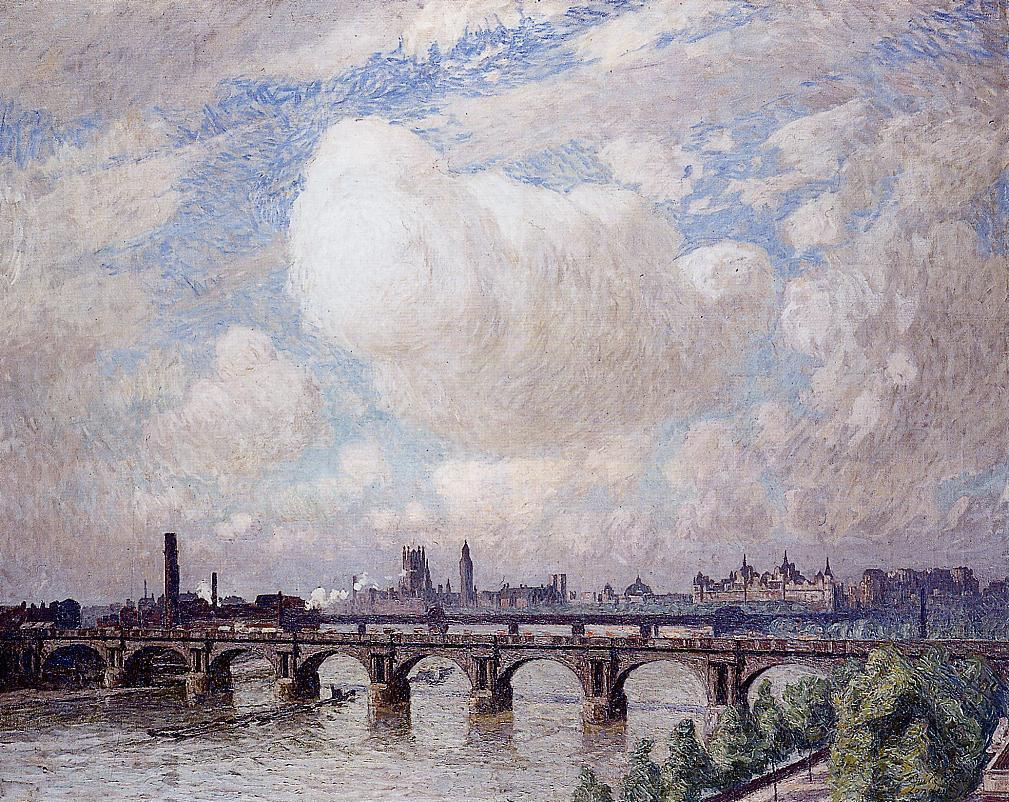
Waterloo Bridge in the Sun, 1914-18?

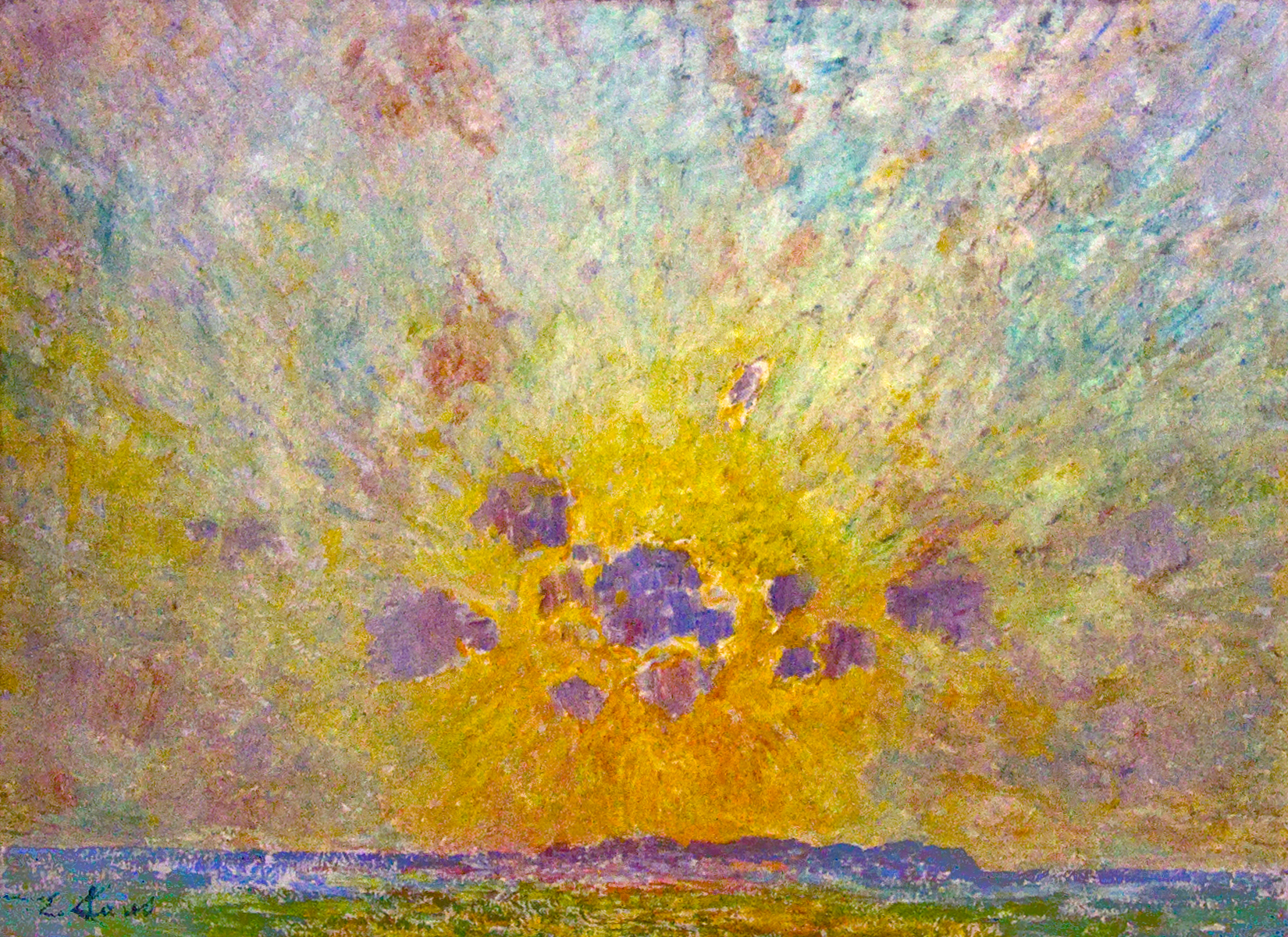
Sunglow

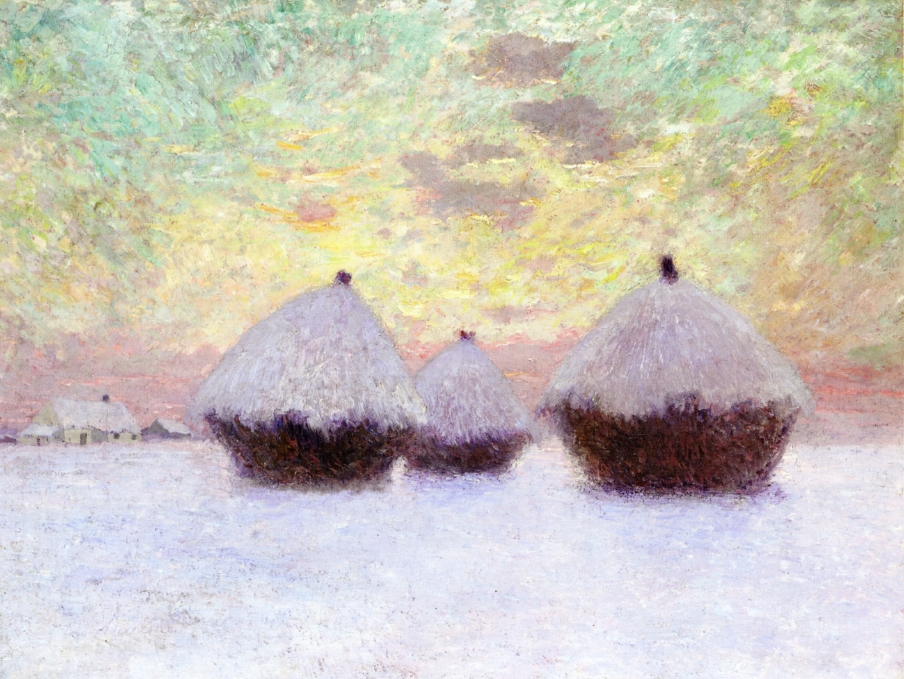
Haystacks in the Snow

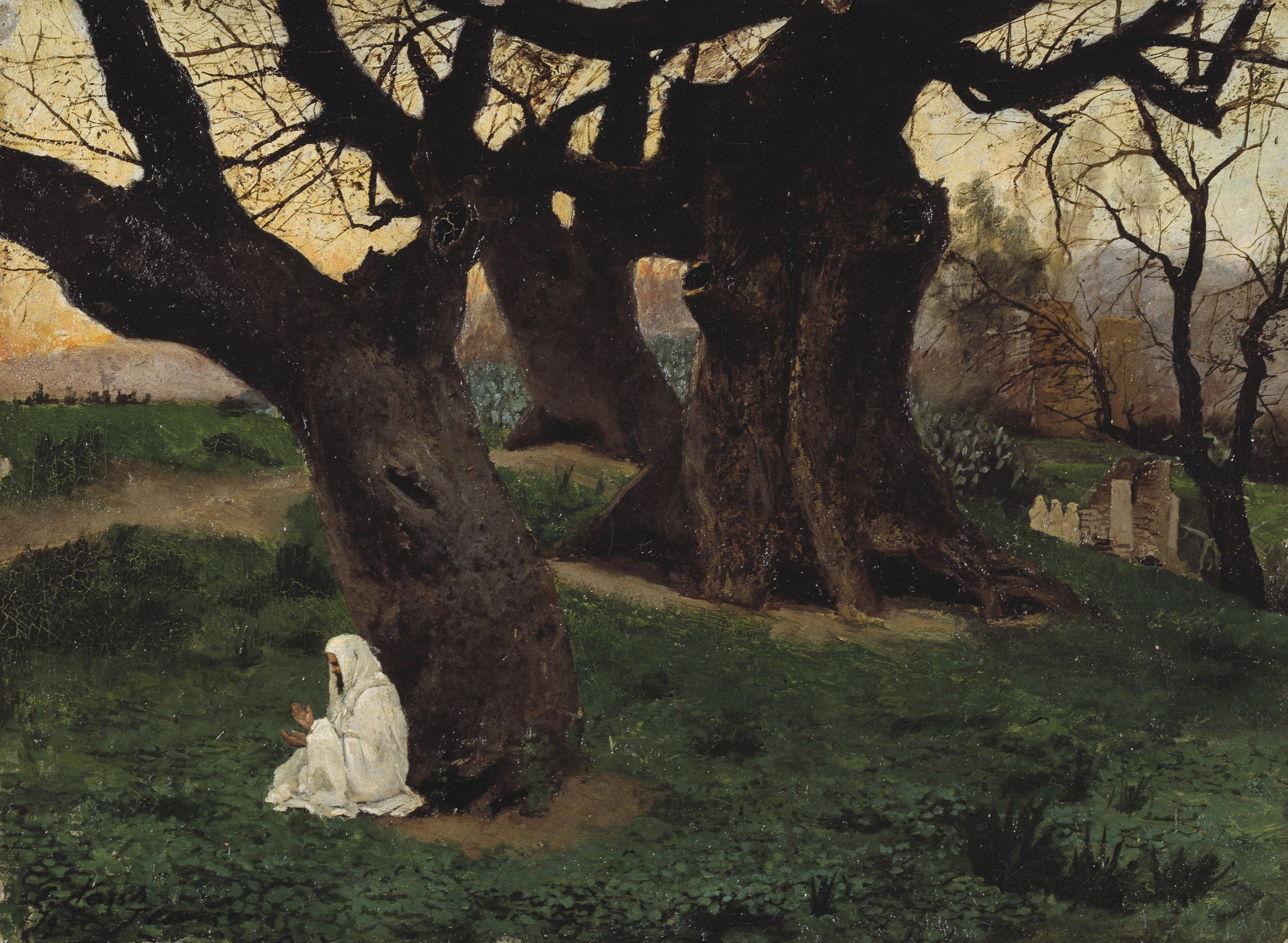
Landscape in Algeria

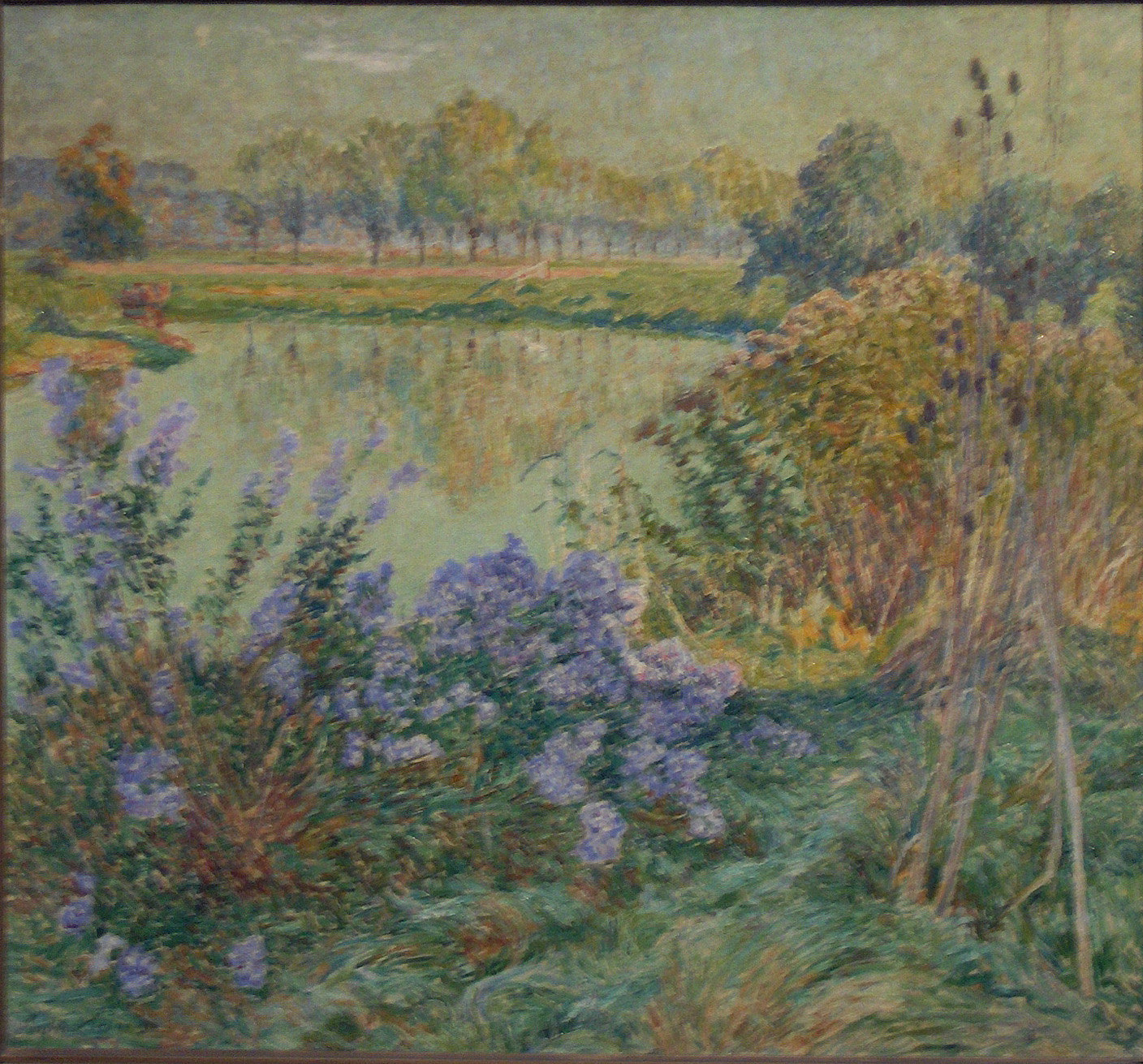
Asters and Starflowers

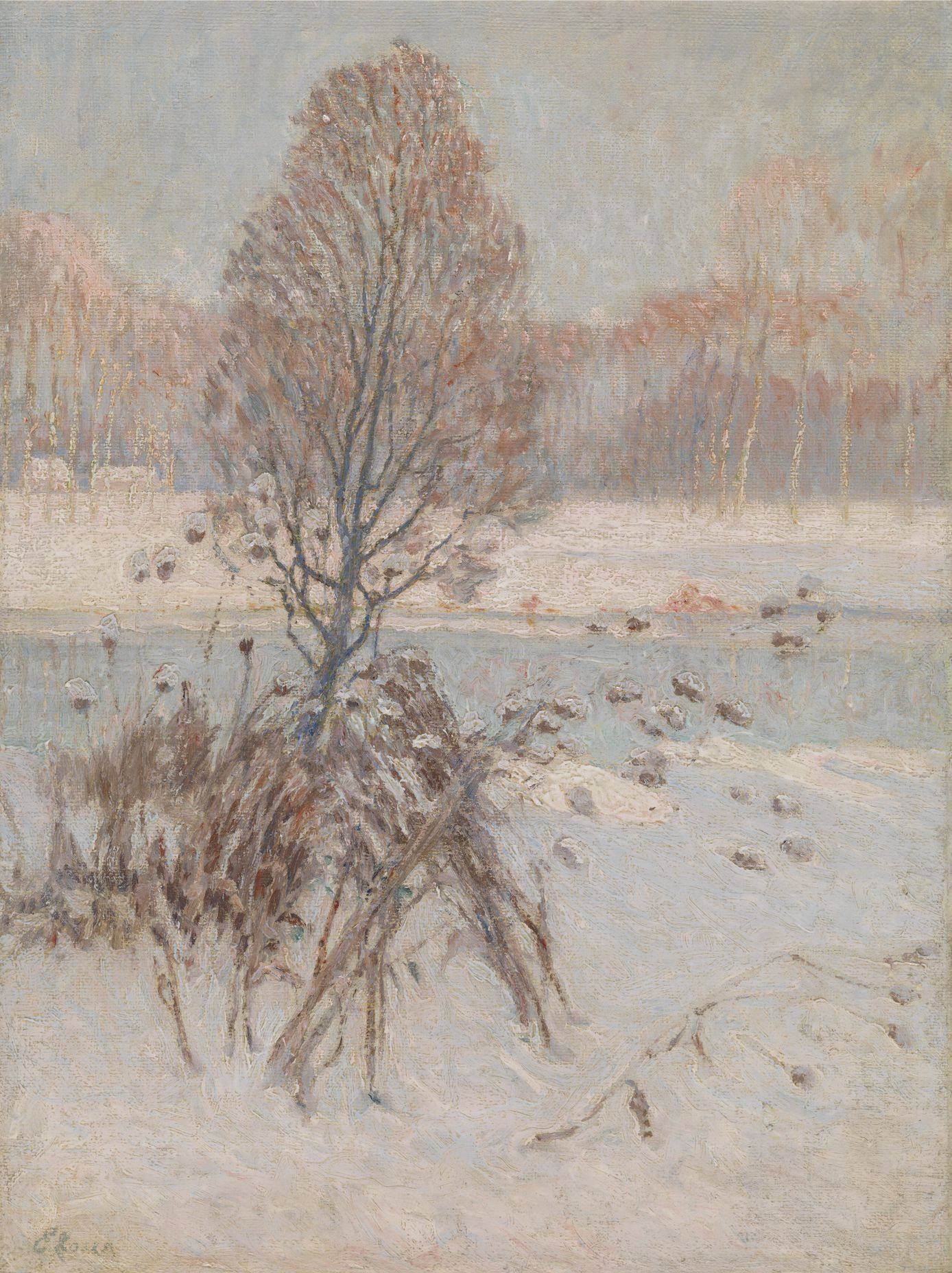
Snowy landscape

In 2007, the paintings The Beet Harvest and The Ice Birds have been included in the cultural heritage list of the Flemish community.

== Museums and public collections ==
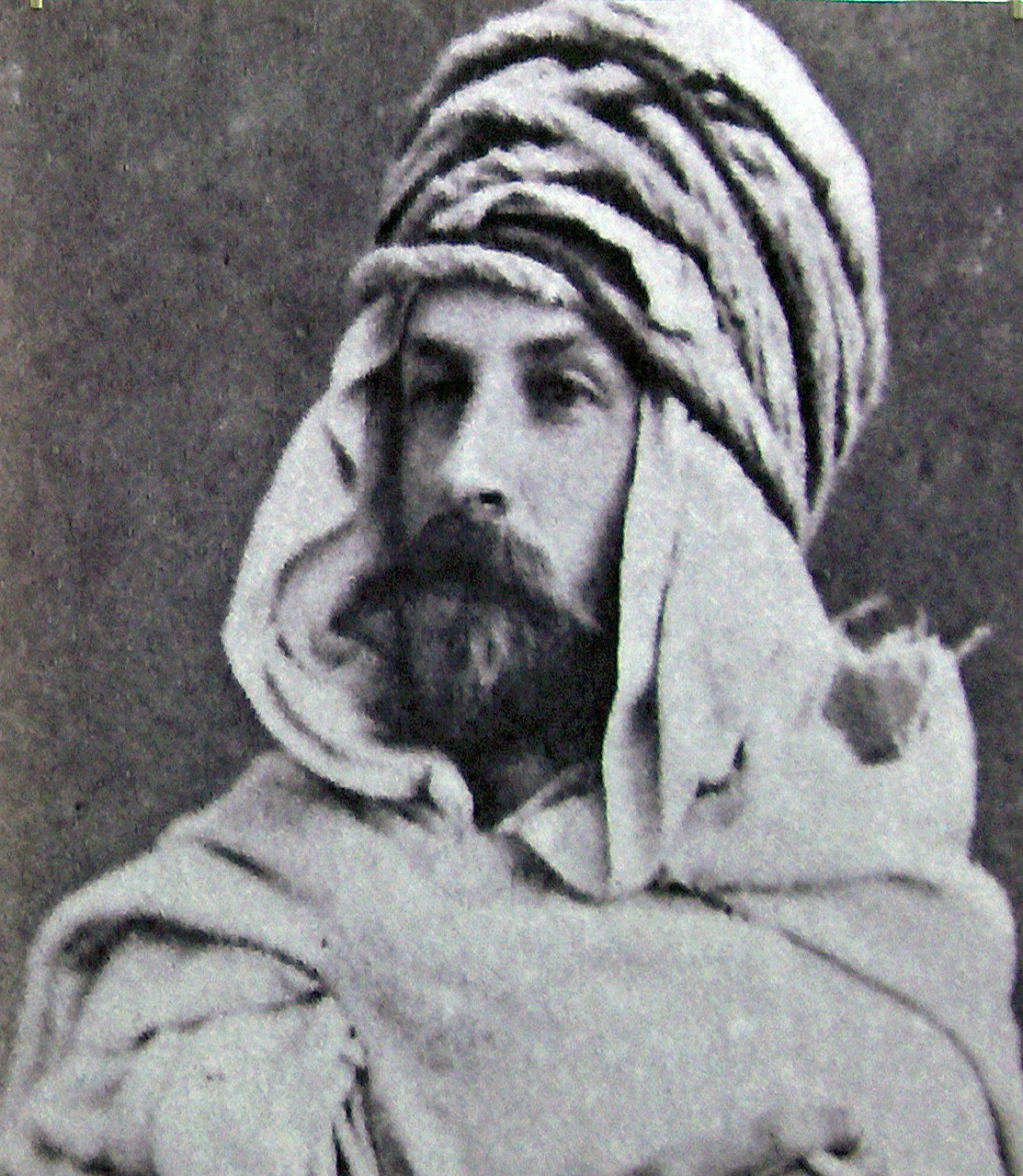
Emile Claus during his journey to Algeria, 1879. Here with an Algerian traditional burnus

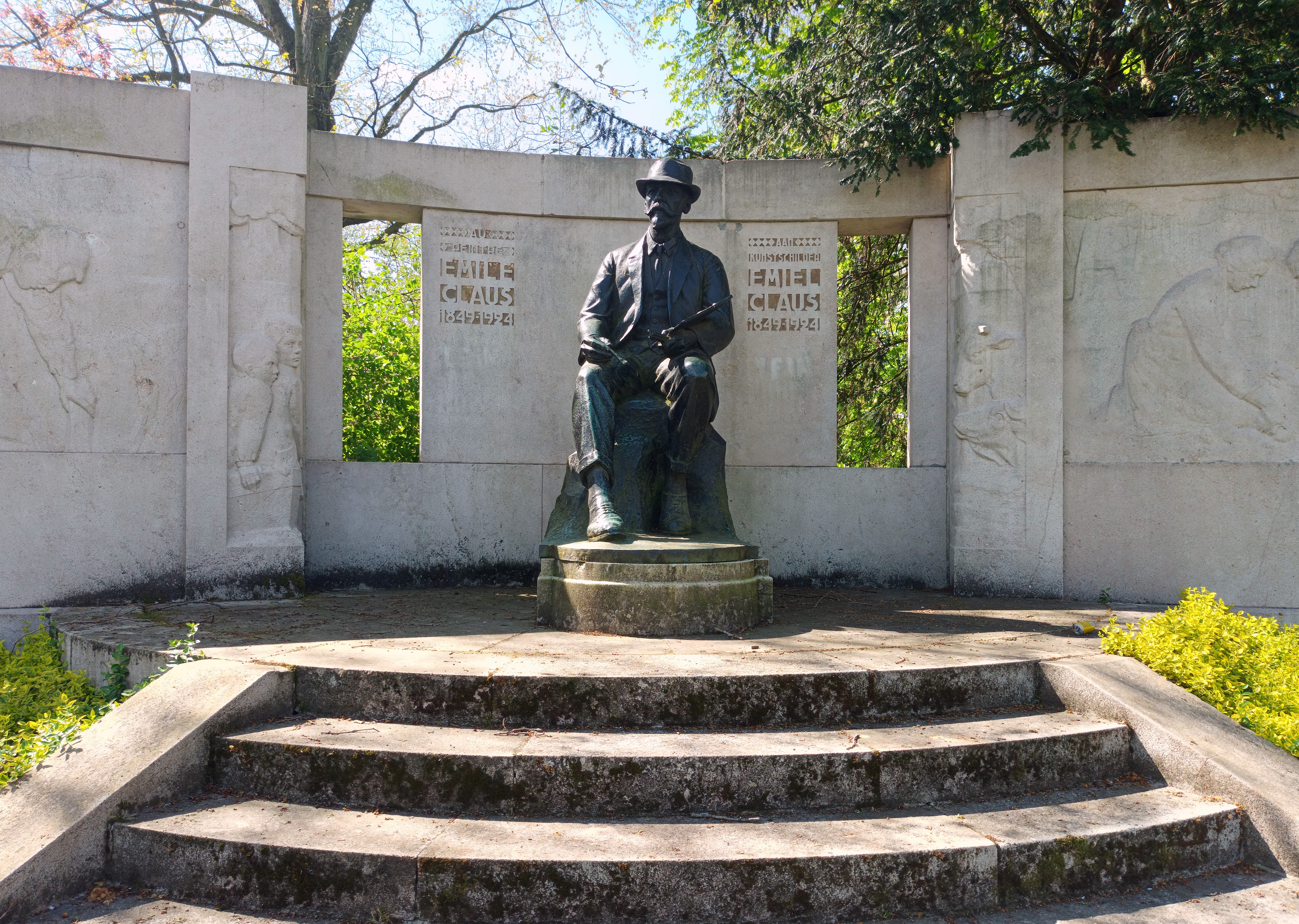
Statue of Emile Claus in Ghent, Belgium

Claus' paintings can be seen in the following museums, collections, and cities:

- The Groeningemuseum, Bruges, Belgium
- The Royal Museums of Fine Arts of Belgium, Brussels, Belgium
- The Museum van Deinze en de Leiestreek, Deinze, Belgium
- The Camille Lemonnier Museum, Elsene, Belgium
- The Museum of Fine Arts, Ghent, Belgium
- The Musée d'art moderne et d'art contemporain de Liège (MAMAC), Belgium
- The Museum of Fine Arts, Mons, Mons, Belgium
- The Mu.ZEE, Ostend, Belgium
- The Museum of Fine Arts, Tournai, Belgium
- The Kunstmuseum Den Haag, The Hague, The Netherlands
- The Musée de la Chartreuse, Douai, France
- The Palace of Fine Arts, Lille, France
- The Musée d'Orsay, Paris, France
- The Museum of Western and Eastern Art, Odessa, Ukraine
- The Fine Arts Museums, San Francisco, US
- Collection of the Province of East Flanders, Belgium
- Belfius Art Collection, Brussels, Belgium
- Adelaide, Australia
- Barcelona, Spain
- Bayonne, France
- Berlin, Germany
- Florence, Italy
- Göteborg, Sweden
- Osaka, Japan
- Reims, France
- Rome, Italy
- São Paulo, Brazil
- Venice, Italy
- Verviers, Belgium
- Warsaw, Poland

== Literature ==
- Gabriel Mourey, The Work of Emile Claus, in The Studio, issue 77, August 1899, p. 143-157.
- Camille Lemonnier, Emile Claus, Brussels, 1908.
- Gustave Vanzype, Notice sur Émile Claus, appeared in l'Annuaire de 1929, Académie royale de Belgique, 33 p., Brussels.
- Alice Santon, Un prince du Luminisme : Émile Claus (1849-1924) ('A Prince of Luminism'), Collection nationale : 7e série, n° 73, Office de publicité, Brussels, 1946.
- François Maret, Les peintres luministes, Series: L'art en Belgique, Éditions du Cercle d’art, Brussels, 1944. 46 p.
- François Maret, Emile Claus, De Sikkel, Antwerp, 1949.
- Paul Eeckhout, introduction by Gontran Van Severen, Retrospective Emile Claus : 1849-1924, exhibition catalogue, Ghent, Museum of Fine Arts, 1974, 35 p.
- P. & V. Berko, Dictionary of Belgian painters born between 1750 & 1875, Knokke 1981, p. 98-101.
- Lexicon van Westvlaamse beeldende kunstenaars ('Lexicon of West Flemish Visual Artists'), 3, Kortrijk, 1994.
- Le dictionnaire des peintres belges du XIVe siècle à nos jours ('Dictionary of Belgian Painters from the 14th Century to Present Day'), Brussels, 1994.
- Johan De Smet, Emile Claus : 1849-1924, exhibition catalogue, 14 June till 5 October 1997, Ostend, P.M.M.K. ('Provincial Museum of Modern Art'), Pandora, Snoeck-Ducaju & Zoon, 1997, 266 p.
- M. Tahon-Vanroose, De Vrienden van Scribe. De Europese smaak van een Gents mecenas ('The Friends of Scribe. The European Taste of a Ghent Maecenas'), exhibition catalogue, Ghent-Antwerp, 1998.
- Allgemeines Künstlerlexikon ('General Art Lexicon'), 19, Munich-Leipzig, 1998.
- Allgemeines Künstlerlexikon - Internationale Künstlerdatenbank - Online, ISSN: 1865-0511, online available from 2009 till 2022, replaced by Artists of the World, online database.
- Johan De Smet, Sint-Martens-Latem en de Kunst aan de Leie ('St Martin's Latem and the Art at the River Leie'), Tielt, 2000.
- Johan De Smet, 'Emile Claus', in: Nationaal Biografisch Woordenboek ('National Biographical Dictionary'), p. 16, Brussels, 2002.
