= Franz Hellens =

Belgian novelist, poet and critic

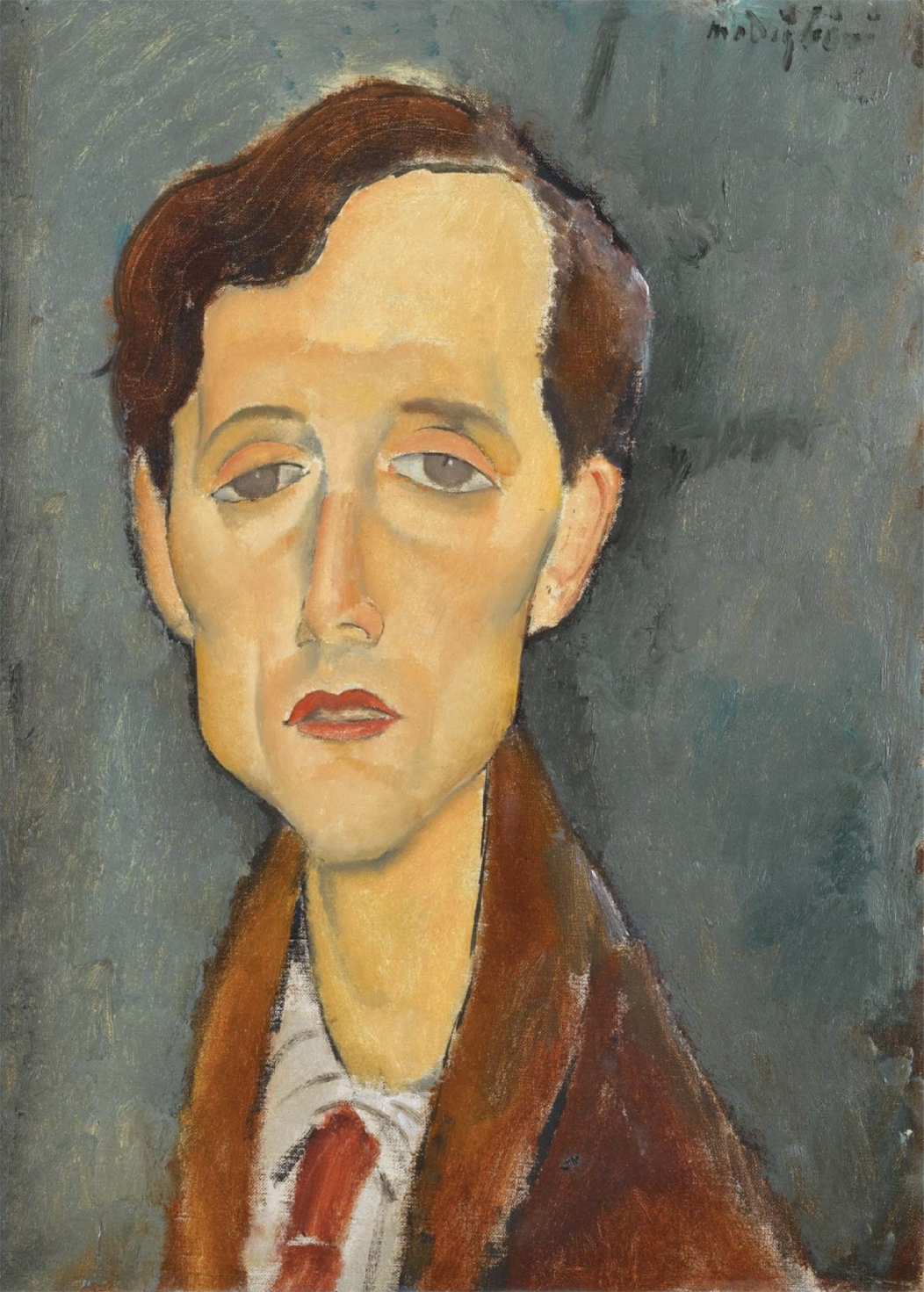
- Frans Hellens, by Amedeo Modigliani (1919)
- Born: 8 September 1881; Brussels, Belgium
- Died: 20 January 1972 (aged 90); Brussels, Belgium
- Occupations: novelist, poet and critic

Franz Hellens, born Frédéric van Ermengem (8 September 1881, in Brussels – 20 January 1972, in Brussels) was a prolific Belgian novelist, poet and critic. Although of Flemish descent, he wrote entirely in French, and lived in Paris from 1947 to 1971. He was nominated for the Nobel Prize in Literature four times.

He is known as one of the major figures in Belgian magic realism (fantastique quotidien), and as the indefatigable editor of Signaux de France et de Belgique (later Le Disque vert). The only work translated into English is Mémoires d'Elseneur ("Memoirs from Elsinore", 1954).

His father, Émile van Ermengem, was the bacteriologist who discovered the cause of botulism. His younger brother was the writer François Maret (Frans van Ermengem).

== Life ==
His father was a bacteriologist, and when in 1886 he was appointed professor at the University of Ghent the Van Ermengem family moved from Brussels to Wetteren, and then to Ghent in 1894. After an abortive attempt to publish a collection of sonnets, Frédéric began studying law at the same university in 1900, but after earning his degree he gave up the idea of a legal career in order to continue writing, moving to Ixelles and taking employment as a librarian in 1906. His first book was the novel En ville morte. In 1907 he married Marguerite Nyst against the will of his parents; they had one daughter, Claire (born 1909). He published two collections of short stories, Hors-le-vent (1909) and Clartés latentes (1912).

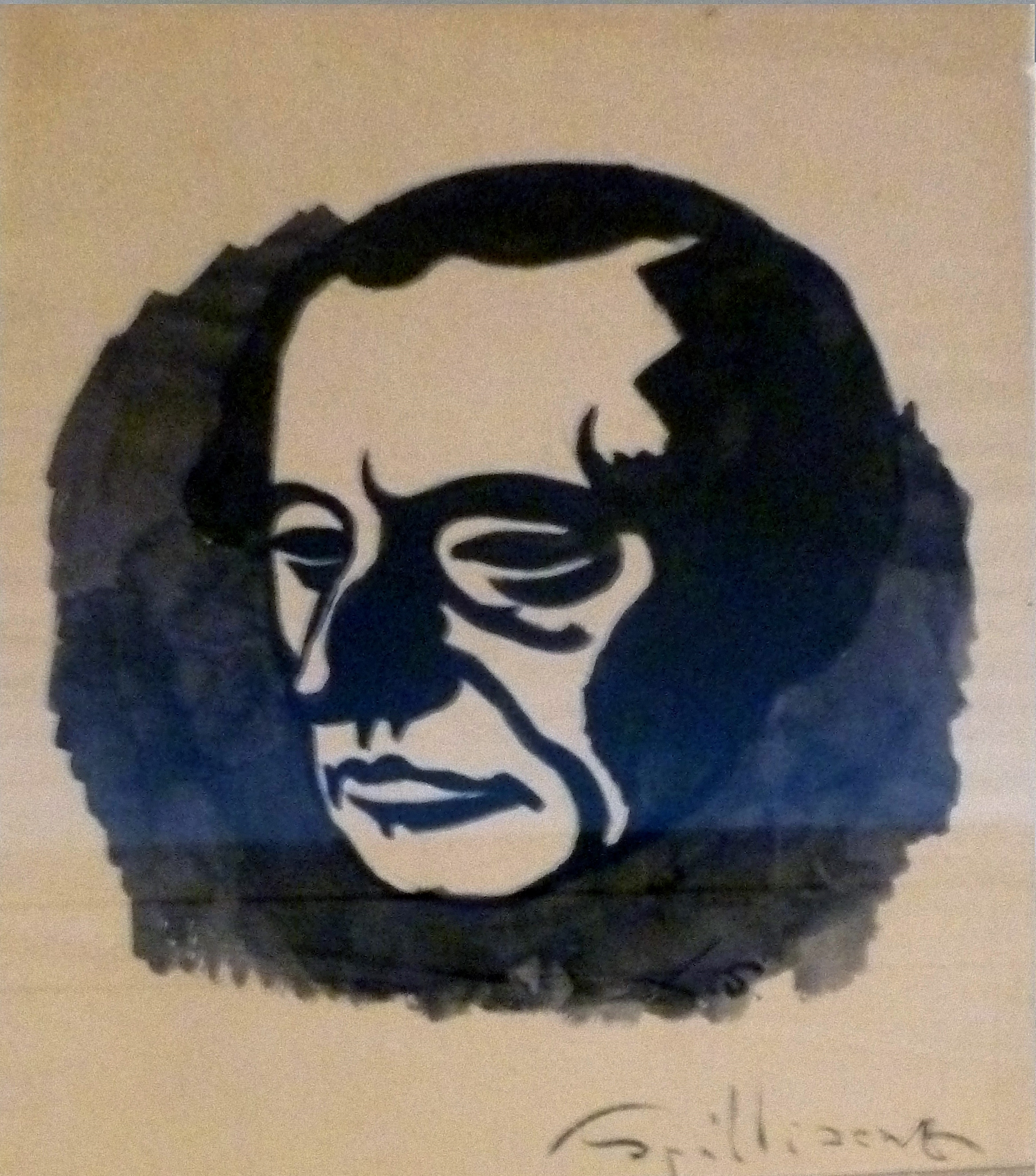
Portrait by Léon Spilliaert (1920)

At the outbreak of war, Hellens was ineligible for service. He spent some months in England before travelling to the Côte d'Azur, where he met many famous artists and writers, and fell in love with a married Russian named Maria Miloslavskaya (1893–1947). He returned with her to Brussels in 1920, the same year he published Mélusine, and married her on 20 July 1925, having divorced Marguerite in 1919. They had one daughter, Marie-Elisabeth (b. 1927), and two sons, Alexandre (1921–1940) and Serge (b. 1929).

On 1 May 1921 Hellens and André Salmon founded the Signaux de France et de Belgique (1921–1941), a magazine which had great influence on Belgian literary life. He made trips to Italy in 1925 and 1926 and to Norway in 1936. His father died in 1932, an event which prompted him to begin writing his voluminous diaries. In 1937 he signed the famous Manifeste du lundi of Charles Plisnier, a denunciation of regionalism.

His eldest son died in fighting near Rouen; nevertheless he continued to publish work throughout the war. Maria died on 5 October 1947. He married Hélène Burbulis on 26 November and moved to Paris, where he stayed until her death in 1971. He reestablished Le Disque vert with René de Soher in 1951, and compiled a collected volume of his poetry in 1959. Professing himself dissatisfied with all his work, he continued to write throughout his old age.

In an interview from August 1970, Vladimir Nabokov said:

Hellens was a tall, lean, quiet, very dignified man of whom I saw a good deal in Belgium in the middle thirties when I was reading my own stuff in lecture halls for large émigré audiences. La femme partagée (1929), a novel, I like particularly, and there are three or four other books that stand out among the many that Hellens wrote. I tried to get someone in the States to publish him -- Laughlin, perhaps -- but nothing came of it. Hellens would get excellent reviews, was beloved in Belgium, and what friends he had in Paris tried to brighten and broaden his reputation. It is a shame that he is read less than that awful Monsieur Camus and even more awful Monsieur Sartre.

== Selected works ==
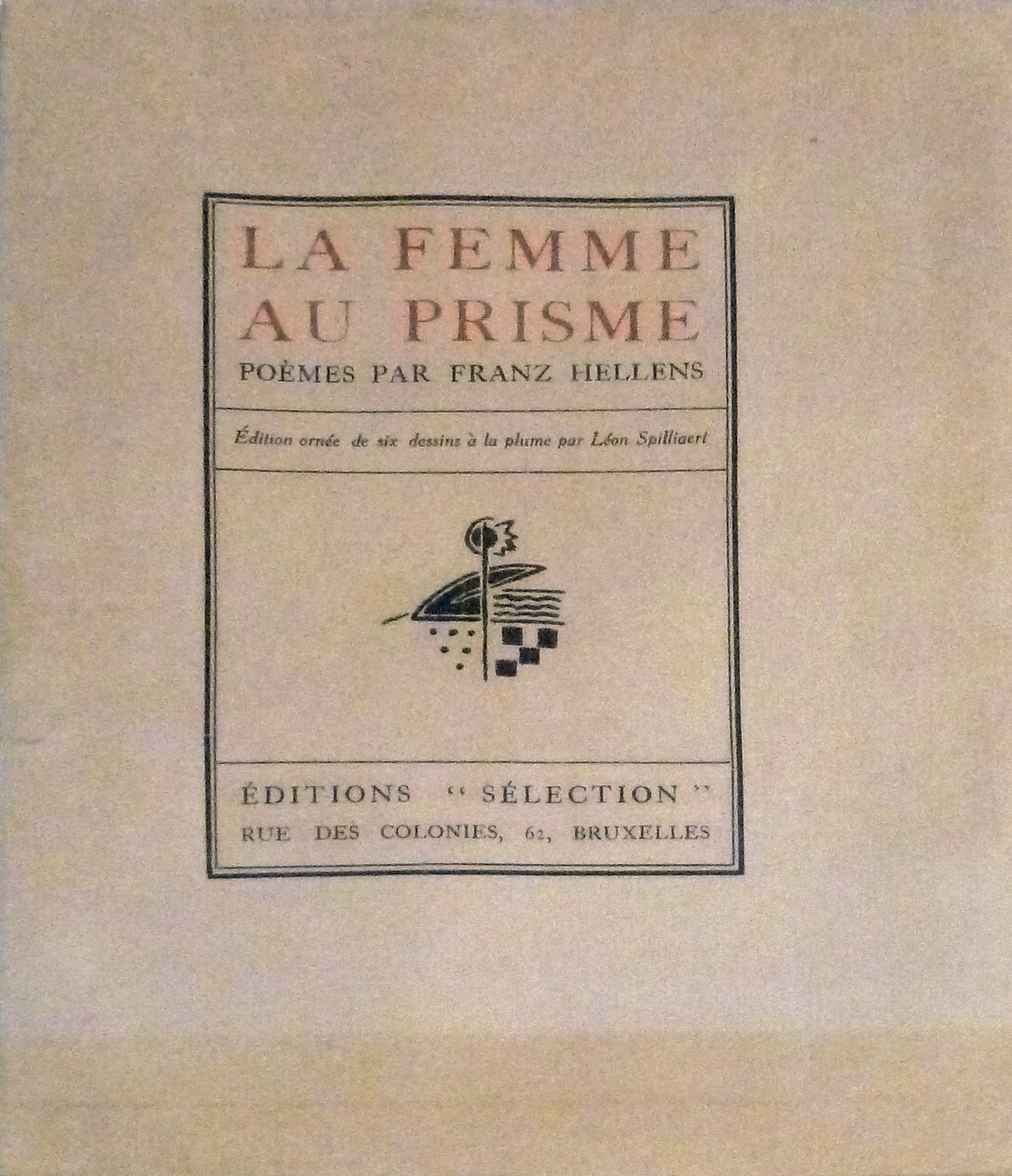
"La Femme au Prisme" (1920)

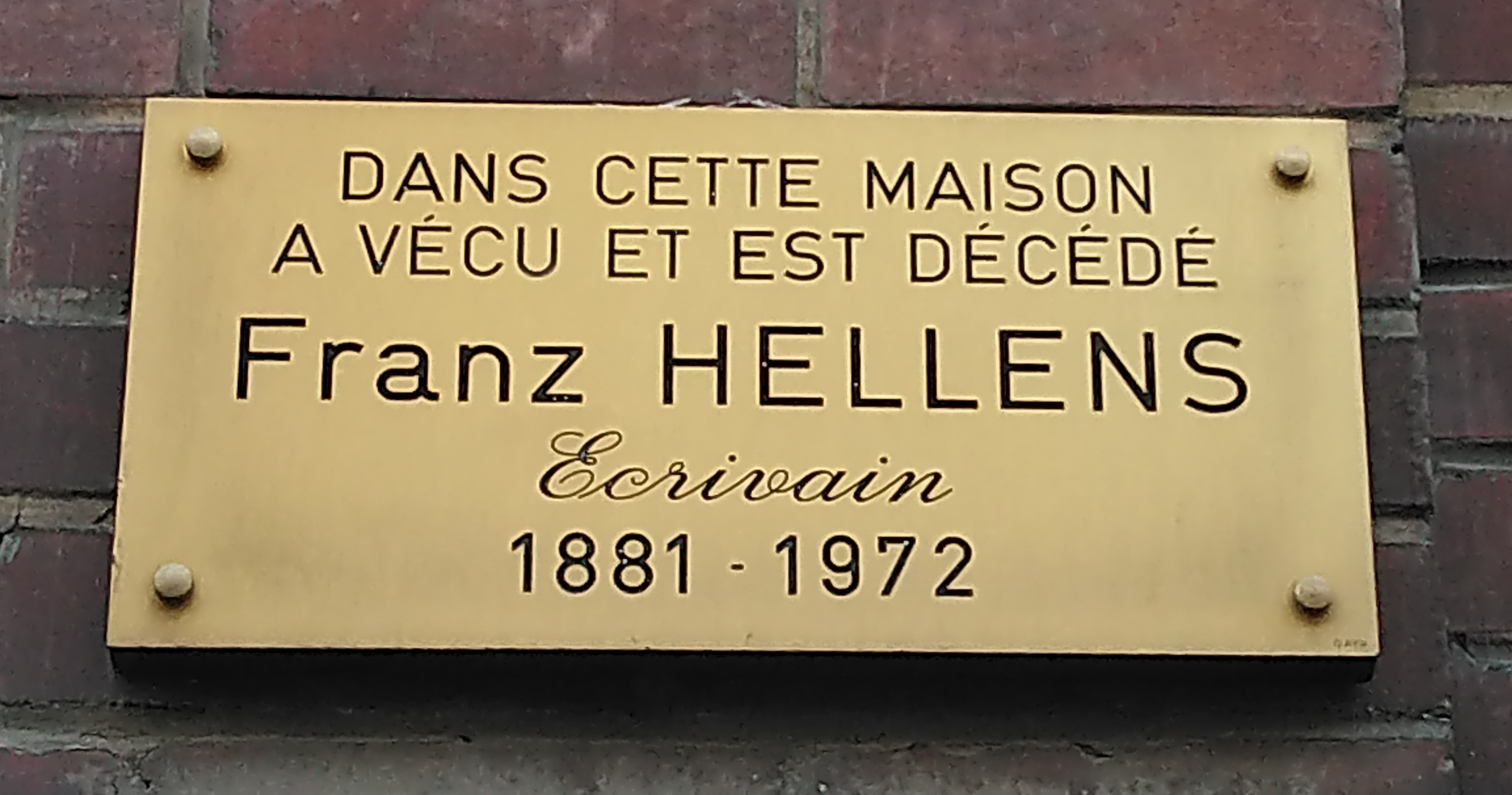
Memorial plaque of Franz Hellens in Ixelles, Brussels

- En ville morte, 1906
- Les hors-le-vent, 1909
- Les clartés latentes. Vingt contes et paraboles, 1912
- Nocturnal, preceded by Quinze histoires, 1919
- Mélusine, 1920, 1952
- La femme au prisme, 1920
- Bass-Bassina-Boulou, 1922
- Réalités fantastiques, 1923
- Notes prises d'une lucarne, 1925
- Oeil-de-Dieu, 1925, 1959
- Le naïf, Paris, 1926
- Eclairages, 1916–1923, 1926
- L'Enfant et l'écuyère, 1927
- Le jeune homme Annibal, 1929, 1961
- La femme partagée, 1929
- Les filles du désir, 1930
- Documents secrets, 1905–1931, 1932
- Poésie de la veille et du lendemain 1917–1927, 1932
- Fraîcheur de la mer, 1933
- Frédéric, 1935
- Le magasin aux poudres, 1936
- Nouvelles réalités fantastiques, 1943
- Moralités peu salutaires, 1943
- Fantômes vivants, 1944
- La vie seconde, 1945, 1963
- Moreldieu, 1946, 1960
- Naître et mourir, 1948
- Miroirs conjugués, 1950
- Pourriture noble, 1951
- Testament, 1951
- L'homme de soixante ans, 1951
- Les marées de l'Escaut, 1953
- Mémoires d'Elseneur, 1954. English translation by Howard Curtis. (2000). Memories of Elsinore. New York: Peter Lang
- Style et caractère, 1956
- Les saisons de Pontoise, 1956
- Dans l'automne de mon grand âge, 1956
- Documents secrets 1905-1956, 1958
- Poésie complète, 1905–1959, 1959
- Petit théâtre aux chandelles, 1960
- L'âge dur, 1957–1960, 1961
- Valeurs sûres, 1962
- Herbes méchantes, 1964
- La comédie des portraits, 1965
- Poétique des éléments et des mythes, 1966
- Le dernier jour du monde, 1967
- Le fantastique réel, 1967
- Arrière-saisons, 1960–1967, 1967
- Paroles sans musique, 1969
- Cet âge qu'on dit grand, essay, 1970

== Awards ==
- Prix triennal pour les nouvelles (for Fraîcheur de la mer, 1933)
- Grand Prix de la Société des Gens de Lettres (1956)
- Grand Prix de Littérature française hors de France (Fondation Nessim Habif, 1964) (Académie royale de langue et de littérature françaises de Belgique)

== Bibliography ==
- R. Frickx. Franz Hellens ou Le temps dépassé. Palais des Académies, Bruxelles, 1992.
