= Trabert =

Trabert is a surname. Notable people with the surname include:

- Angelika Trabert (born 1967), German physician and Paralympic equestrian
- Bettina Trabert (born 1969), German chess player
- Gerhard Trabert (born 1956), German public figure
- Tony Trabert (1930–2021), American tennis player, writer and sports announcer

== See also ==
- Traber
