= Marett =

Marett is a surname, and may refer to:

- Carol Marett (born 1944), former New Zealand international cricketer
- Graeme Marett, New Zealand Paralympic athlete
- Sir Robert Pipon Marett (1820–1884), Jersey lawyer, journalist, poet, politician
- Robert Ranulph Marett (1866–1943), British ethnologist, son of Robert Pipon Marett
- Robert Marett (diplomat) (1907–1981), British author and diplomat

== See also ==
- Maret (name)
