= Émile van Ermengem =

Belgian bacteriologist

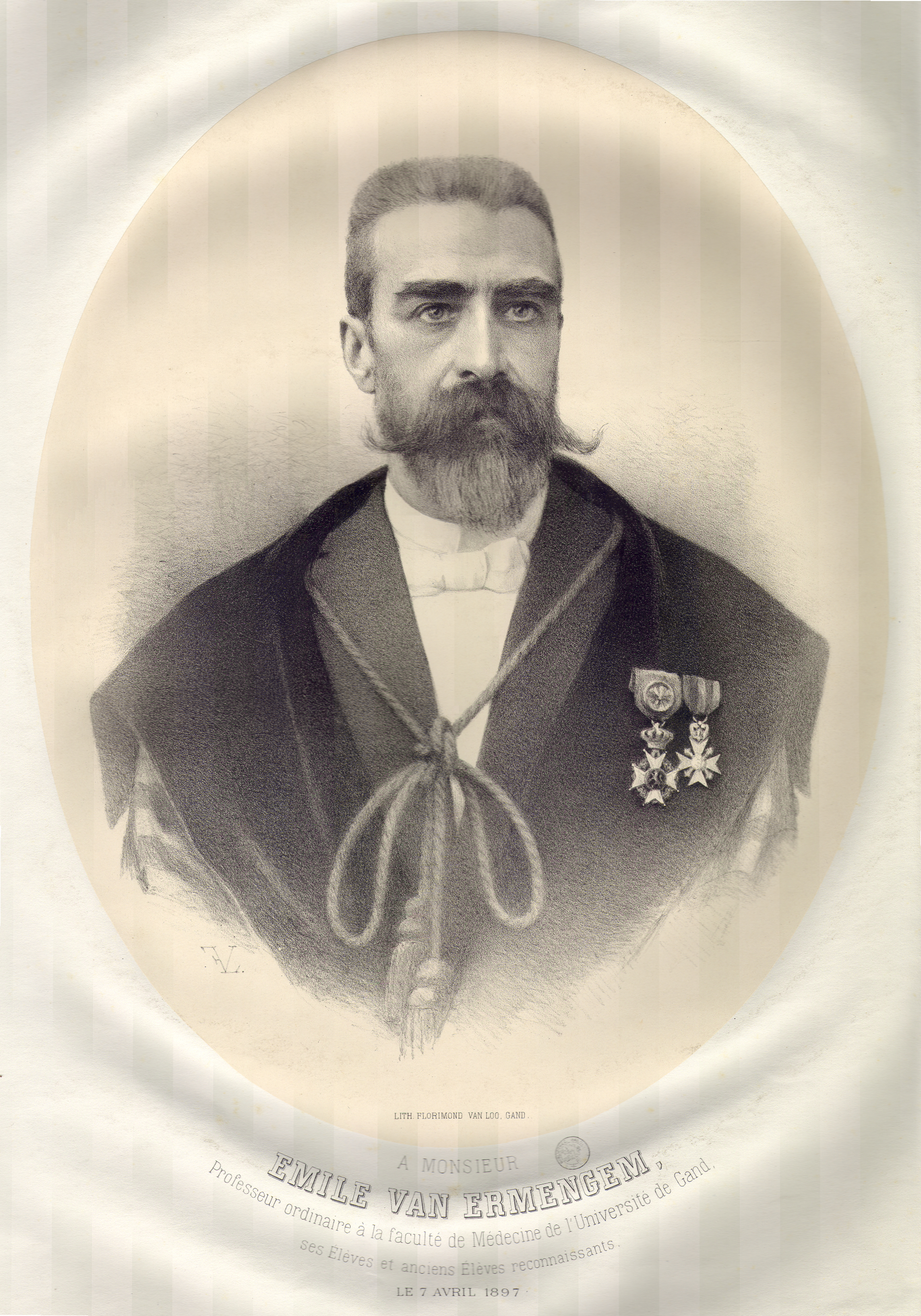
Émile van Ermengem (1897)

Émile Pierre-Marie van Ermengem (1851–1932) was a Belgian bacteriologist who, in 1895, isolated Clostridium botulinum, the bacterium that causes botulism, from a piece of ham that had poisoned thirty-four people.

== Life ==
Van Ermengem was born in Leuven on 15 August 1851. After studying in Berlin he became a professor at the University of Ghent. He became a corresponding member of the Académie royale de médecine de Belgique in 1887 and a full member in 1902, serving as secretary 1919–1932.

He died in Ghent on 29 September 1932. His sons were the writer Franz Hellens and the art critic François Maret.

== Bibliography ==
Novak, John S., Peck, Micheal W.; Juneja, Vijay K.; Johnson, Eric A. (2005). "Chapter 19: Clostridium botulinum and Clostridium perfringens". In Fratamico, Pina M.; Bhunia, Arun K. & Smith, James L. (eds.). Foodborne pathogens: microbiology and molecular biology (1st ed.). Wymondham: Caister Academic Press. p. 385. ISBN 978-1-904455-00-4.
