= Maret Merisaar =

Estonian politician (born 1958)

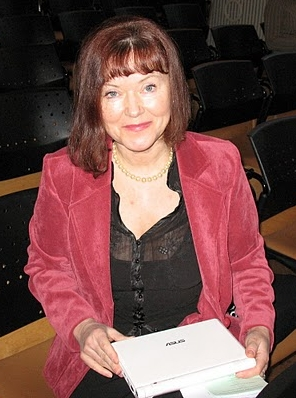
Maret Merisaar in 2008.

Maret Merisaar (born February 13, 1958) is an Estonian biologist and politician. She was originally a member of XI Riigikogu.

She is a member of Estonian Greens.
