= Maret G. Traber =

American research biochemist

- Born: 1950; Stockton, California, US
- Spouse: Biff Traber

Academic background
- Education: BSc, Nutrition and Food Science, 1972, PhD, Nutrition, 1976, University of California, Berkeley
- Thesis: Cholesterol absorption: a mechanism for control of cholesterol pool size in cholesterol fed guinea pigs. (1976)

Academic work
- Institutions: Linus Pauling Institute; Oregon State University; New York University Grossman School of Medicine; Rutgers University
- Main interests: bioavailable vitamin E

Maret Gillett Traber (born 1950) is an American research biochemist. She is the Ava Helen Pauling Professor at the Linus Pauling Institute at Oregon State University.

== Early life and education ==
Traber was born in Stockton, California in 1950 to a milkman father and Estonian immigrant mother. She attended the University of California, Berkeley for her Bachelor of Science and PhD in nutrition during the 1970s. Upon graduating, she followed her husband Biff to New Jersey and accepted a part time position assisting graduate students at Rutgers University.

== Career ==
Following her nine-month stint at Rutgers, Traber became a research scientist at the New York University Grossman School of Medicine. While at NYU Grossman, she became interested in Vitamin E research as its deficiencies were attributed to neurological disorders. Traber worked with a research team to study low-density lipoprotein receptors in individuals suffering from inherited disorders of metabolic diseases. This led Traber and her colleagues to begin investigating the absorption and transport of Vitamin E.

Traber remained in New York for 17 years before becoming an associate research biochemist at her alma mater. In this role, her research team found evidence that gamma-tocopherol played a crucial and complementary role in the body similar to those provided by vitamin E supplements with alpha-tocopherol. In 1998, Traber accepted a tenure-track position at Oregon State University to explore vitamin E metabolism and its role in degenerative diseases.

=== Oregon State ===
Upon joining the faculty at Oregon State University, Traber was appointed to the Panel on Antioxidants and Related Nutrients, Food and Nutrition Board for the National Academy of Sciences. In this role, she helped raise the Recommended Dietary Allowance of vitamin E to 15 milligrams. By 2005, Traber continued to tout the benefits of Vitamin E and became the principal investigator on a study examining its benefits for athletes. Her research team examined the benefits of vitamin E supplements for runners in a 50-kilometre ultramarathon and found that they did not experience the usual increase in lipid oxidation. She also disputed the results of a 10-year study of women over 45 who took vitamin E that found it was ineffective at preventing heart disease. Traber argued that they did not show there was a 34 per cent reduction in heart attacks and a 49 per cent reduction in cardiovascular deaths. She continued to study the effects of Vitamin E on children and in 2010, led a clinical study showing a possible link between peripheral neuropathy and vitamin E deficiencies. She reached this conclusion by analysing eight children with third-degree burns who had lost almost half of their stored vitamin E despite being given a high-calorie diet that contained about 150 percent of the recommended daily allowance of the vitamin.

Following her promotion to an OSU Endowed Chair position, Traber found that vitamin E improve mental acuity tests and had less of the brain shrinkage typical of Alzheimer's disease. By 2013, Traber gained recognition for "pioneering the use of deuterium-labeled Vitamin E for studies evaluating Vitamin E status in humans." As such, she received the DSM Nutritional Sciences Award for her "lifetime commitment and scientific achievements in the field of vitamin E research." She also earned the 2013 Pfizer Consumer Healthcare Nutritional Sciences Award in recognition of recent investigative contributions of significance to the basic understanding of human nutrition.

As a result of her studies into evaluating vitamin E status in people using stable isotopes, Traber received the Medical Research Foundation of Oregon's 2021 Discovery Award. She was also elected a Fellow of the American Society for Nutrition Foundation for "shedding light on key mechanisms for the regulation of vitamin E bioavailability, transport and antioxidant activity."

== Personal life ==
Traber and her husband Biff have one daughter together.
