= François Maret =

- Born: 1893; Wetteren, Belgium
- Died: 1985 (aged 91–92); Gijón, Spain
- Other names: Frans van Ermengem; Frans Ermengem
- Occupations: art critic, painter, poet

François Maret (French: [fʁɑ̃swa maʁɛ]; 1893–1985), also known as Frans van Ermengem or Frans Ermengem, was a Belgian poet, painter and art critic. He was the son of the bacteriologist Émile van Ermengem and the younger brother of the writer Franz Hellens.

He is remembered as an editor of the Tribune dramatique and as a staunch supporter of General Franco in the Spanish Civil War. He translated Dutch books of art criticism like Urbain van de Voorde's Ferdinand Schirren and Hubert Lampo's Lod De Maeyer. He wrote volumes of poetry which he illustrated himself under an assumed name. He also provided new illustrations for books by Charles Baudelaire and Charles van Lerberghe.

His date of death has been given variously as 1973, 1982, and 1985.

== Some works ==
- Les grands chantiers au soleil (1938)
- Le Poisson volant, Les Rascasses, La Panthère noire, short stories (1941)
- Ballade des dames de tous les temps. Asmodée (1943)
- L'île des sirènes (1945)
- Théo van Rysselberghe (1949)
- Eugène Laermans (1959)
- La Conque marine: le phénomène poétique, 1943–1946 (1968)
