= Belfius Art Collection =

Collection of Belgian art

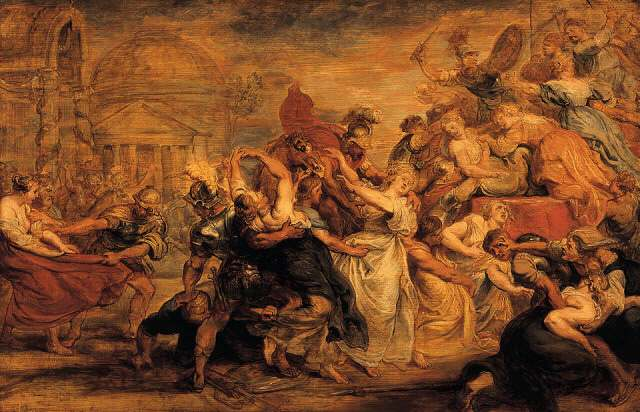
Peter Paul Rubens, 1640, The Rape of the Sabine Virgins

The Belfius Art Collection is a collection of Belgian art owned by the Belfius Bank (and thus as of August 2018 by the Belgian State, owner of Belfius since 2011).

== History ==
The current collection of Belfius Bank is the combination of the collections of three older banks, which are now part of Belfius. Paribas Belgium collected art from the 16th to the 18th century, plus some contemporary (post-WWII) art. The Gemeentekrediet collected Belgian art from 1860 to 1945. BACOB did not start collecting art until 1980, and focused on contemporary Belgian art. Belfius continued collecting art after the fusion of the banks, and the complete collection has grown to more than 4,300 works.

This makes it the largest company-based Belgian art collection, while being considered one of the 100 most important worldwide. The Belgian state took over the bank in 2011, so effectively owns the art collection as well.

Small selections of the collection are open to the public two Saturdays every month. The bank lends works to exhibitions as well.

== Future ==
The plans, as of August 2018, to denationalize Belfius partially or completely by going to a stock exchange with it, have raised concerns about the future of the collection, with calls to separate the art collection from the bank and keep it completely in the hands of the government.

== Collection ==
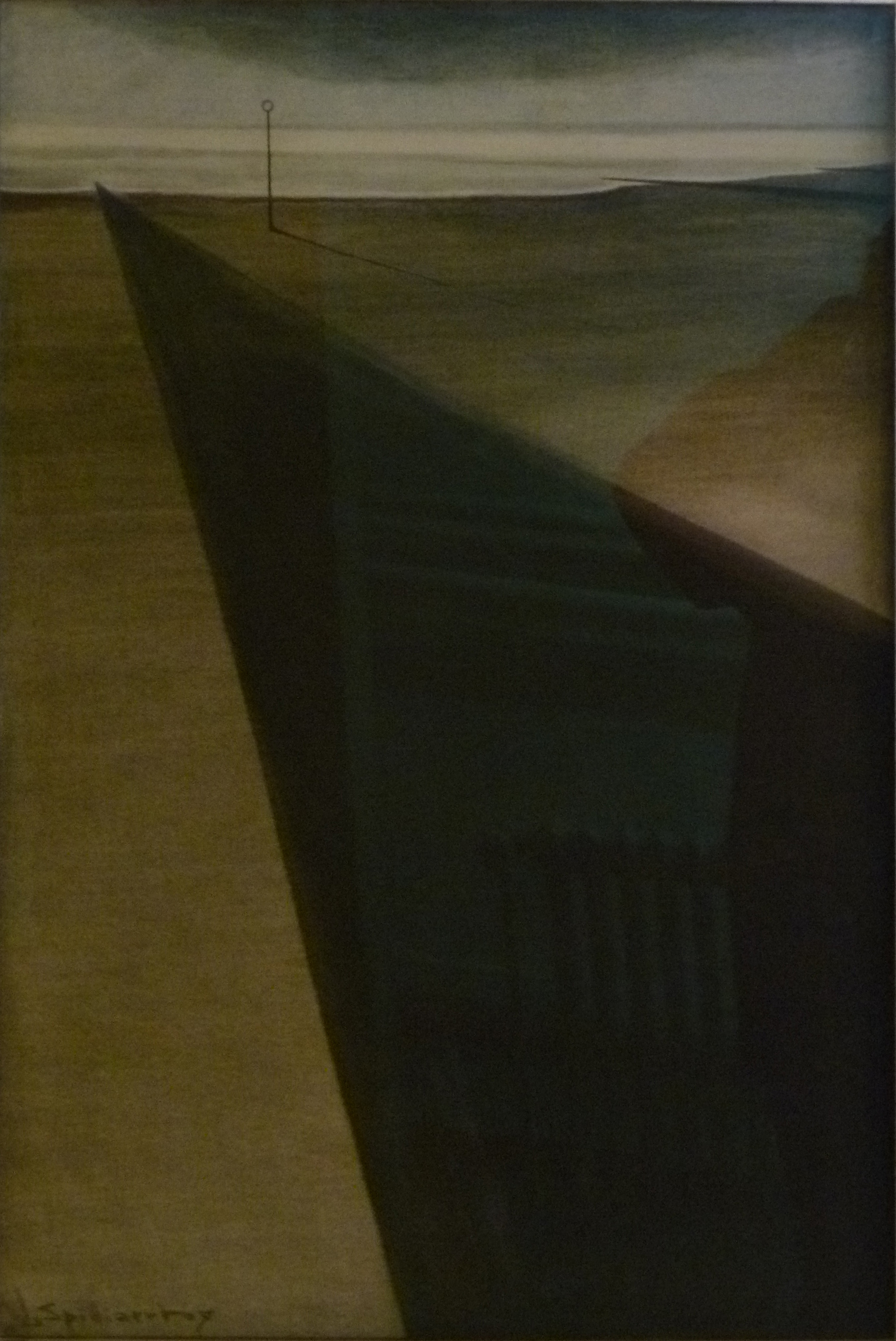
Léon Spilliaert, 1909, Breakwater

The collection is mainly focused on painting and some sculptures, but also contains tapestries, books, and furniture. The below list is based on the works described on the Belfius Art Collection website, and artists and artworks mentioned in other sources.

- Philip Aguirre y Otegui, Man standing before a wall
- Pierre Alechinsky
- Albert Bartsoen, Steenbakkerij in Heusden
- Bram Bogart
- Michaël Borremans, Miranda
- Marcel Broodthaers, Le sous-sol
- Jan Brueghel the Elder together with Hendrick Van Balen, Offergave aan Ceres met guirlande van vruchten
- Jean Brusselmans, Landschap met koeien
- Anto Carte, Madone
- Jacques Charlier, Peinture cruelle
- Emile Claus; De overstroming en De communicanten
- Stijn Cole, L'Extase > 18/9/2017 - 12:55
- Alexandra Cool
- Leo Copers
- Jules De Bruycker
- Berlinde De Bruyckere
- Antoon De Clerck, Roger en Zulma op bezoek
- Thierry De Cordier, Inscripta Christo pagina
- Anne-Pierre de Kat, De lichtekooi
- Raoul De Keyser
- Gery De Smet, Euskal dantzak
- Gustave De Smet, Zitten naakt en Spelende kinderen
- Léon De Smet, De paardenmolen, In de tuin en Portret van een vrouw
- Jules De Sutter, Moeder
- Charles Degroux
- Luc Deleu, De onaangepaste stad – La ville inadaptée
- Ronny Delrue, Maandag, 09.12.2002
- Paul Delvaux, De stad bij dageraad and Het congres
- Wim Delvoye, Angélique
- Denmark, Oratorio del silencio
- Robert Devriendt, Coyote
- Sam Dillemans, Sam-Lizy
- Christian Dotremont, Logogram: Hendes haar…
- Jan Dries, Mummie van het heden
- James Ensor, De dronkaards, De bevrijding van Andromeda and Les bains d'Ostende
- Henri Evenepoel
- Jan Fabre, Mur de la montée des Anges
- Emile Fabry, De tuin der dromen
- Jan Fyt, Stilleven met jachtgerei, gevogelte en vruchtenkorf
- Georges Grard, De grote Afrikaanse
- Philip Huyghe, Jacqueline en Joly
- Ann Veronica Janssens, RAL3002
- Floris Jespers, De cocotte
- Jacob Jordaens, Marsyas door Apollo gevild
- Fernand Khnopff, Portret van Gabriëlle Braun
- Marie-Jo Lafontaine, V.I.N.C.E.N.T.
- Thomas Lerooy, Nest
- Lili Dujourie, Tussen altijd en nooit
- René Magritte
- Hubert Malfait, Boerin, koe en paard and À la fenêtre
- Auguste Mambour, Tête de nègresse
- Pol Mara
- Marcel Marien
- Frans Masereel, De stad and La montée au calvaire
- Xavier Mellery, De dans, De afschaffing der tolgelden
- Herri met de Bles
- Jan Matsys
- Constantin Meunier, Kolenraapster
- Henri Michaux, Sans titre dit Grande bataille
- George Minne, Kind met de waterzak and Treurende moeder met twee kinderen
- Antoine Mortier
- Hans Op De Beeck, Small Pond (2/3)
- Willem Paerels, Portret van Georges Giroux
- Luc Peire, Marcinelle
- Constant Permeke, Hoofd, De verloofden, De dageraad, Staand naakt and Knielende figuur
- Pieter Pourbus
- Arne Quinze
- Roger Raveel, Neerhof II
- Félicien Rops
- Peter Paul Rubens, De roof van de Sabijnse maagden and De verzoening tussen Romeinen en Sabijnen, 2 sketches from 1640 (allegedly the last sketches he finished before his death)
- Meggy Rustamova, Waiting for the secret
- Jacob Savery, De bekering van Paulus
- Roelandt Savery, (De scheiding van de kudden van Jakob en Laba
- Edgar Scauflaire, Naakt met halsketting
- Daniel Seghers, Bloemstuk met Maria en Kind en de jonge Johannes de Doper
- Michel Seuphor, La férule
- Léon Spilliaert, Zeilschip in volle zee, Winterlandschap, Huis op de dijk and Golfbreker met paal
- Piet Stockmans
- Luc Tuymans, The rape and The door
- Edgard Tytgat, Hommage à Mozart "Mozart et les Bohémiens"
- Raoul Ubac, Calvarie
- Rinus Van de Velde, I’ve been in a similar position before : attacked by a personified outside…*
- Gustave Van de Woestyne, Portret van Joseph de Craene
- Frits Van den Berghe, De verrukking, Le repenti, Winter in Blaricum, De ballingen and De schilder
- Koen van den Broek
- Anthony van Dyck
- Roger Van Gindertael, Les trois jongleurs
- Daniel van Heil
- Jan Van Imschoot, Reconstructie van een terechtstelling, de keizer rust and Ja, ja für Elise
- Anne-Mie van Kerckhoven, Maeterlinck
- Théo van Rysselberghe, Het rode zeil
- Dan Van Severen, Triptiek
- Hilde Van Sumere, Swingende dialoog
- Hans Vandekerckhove, The well
- Koen Vanmechelen, Mechelse Redcap + King and Queen + Androgyne
- Geo Verbanck, Brunehilde
- Jan Vercruysse, Les paroles XIII
- Jacques Verduyn, Zittend figuur
- Pieter Vermeersch, Untitled (Inverse 1)
- Liliane Vertessen, Ant-Ik 1986 87/75
- David Vinckboons, Landschap met boeren die terugkeren van het dorpsfeest
- Marthe Wéry
- Rik Wouters, Het zotte geweld, Nel aan de was, Vrouw voor een rode gordijn, Portret van Ernest Wijnants and Borstbeeld van James Ensor
- Maurice Wyckaert, Groot landschap

== Gallery ==
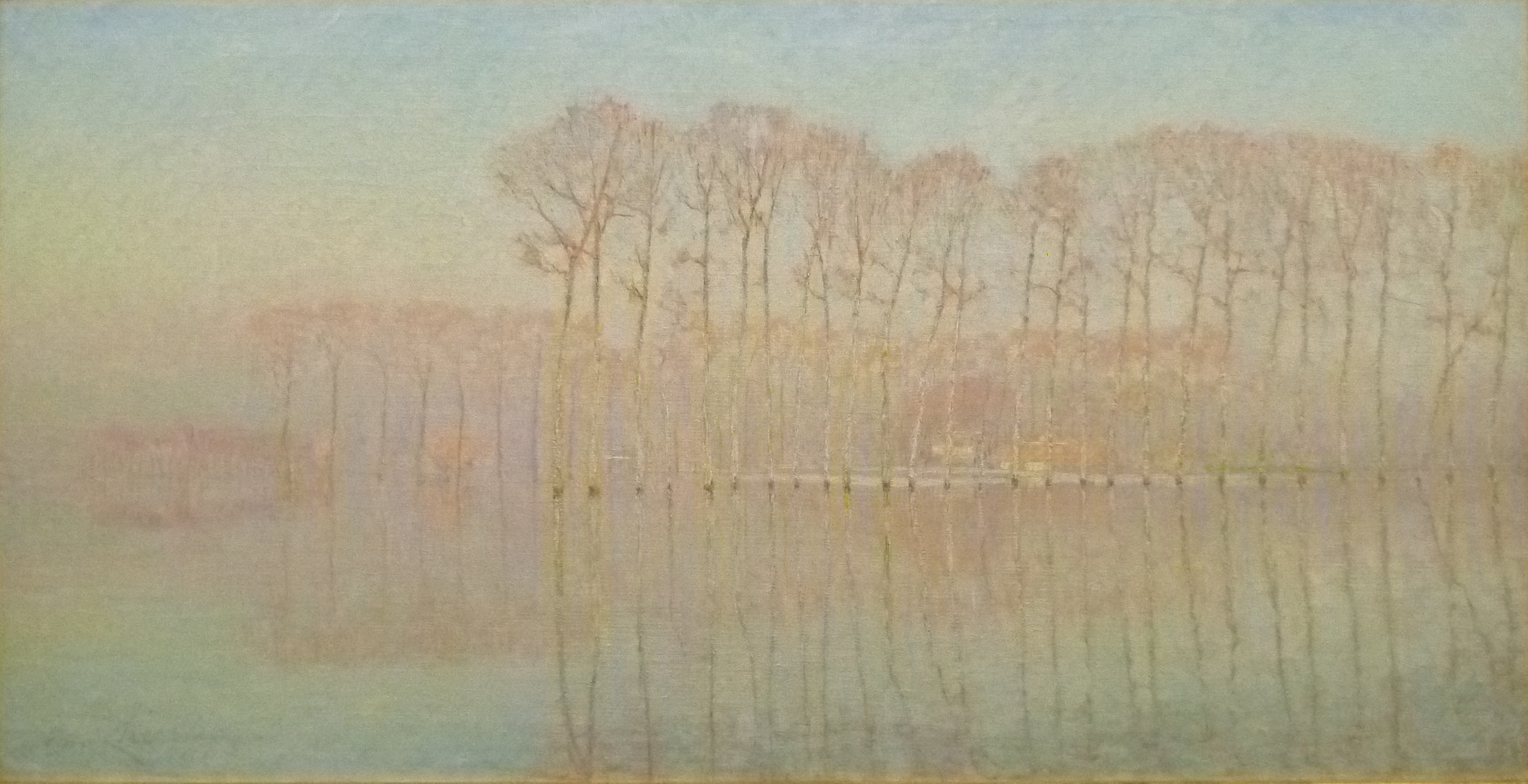
Emile Claus, 1892, The flood

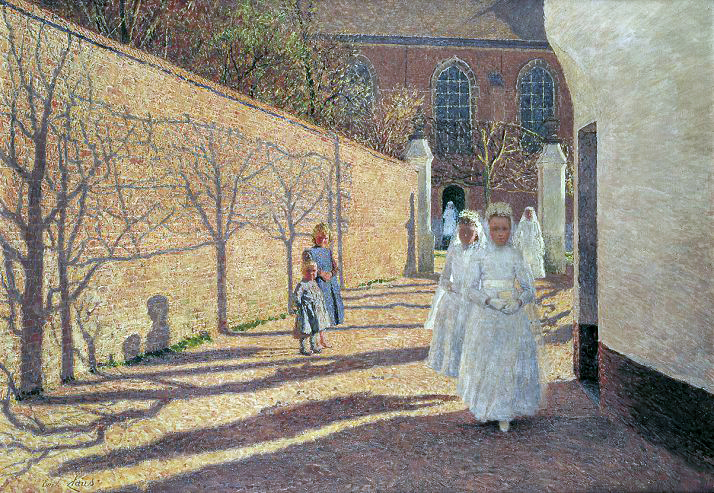
Emile Claus, 1893, First communion

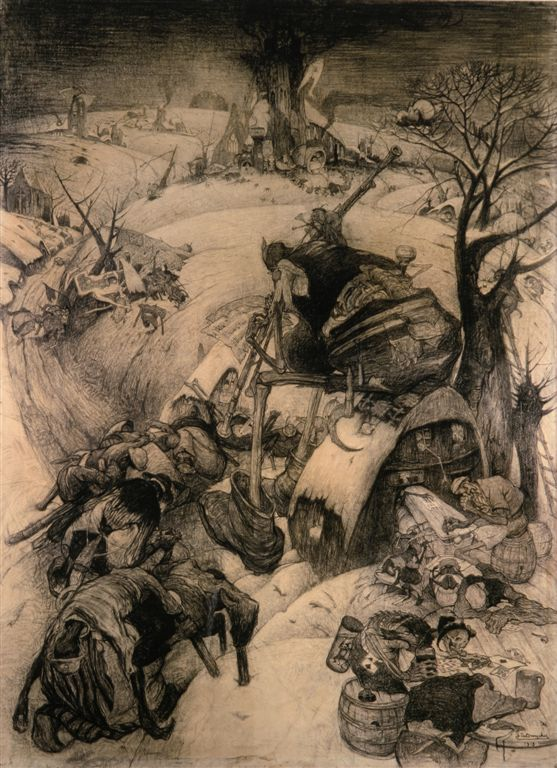
Jules De Bruycker, 1919, Black kermesse

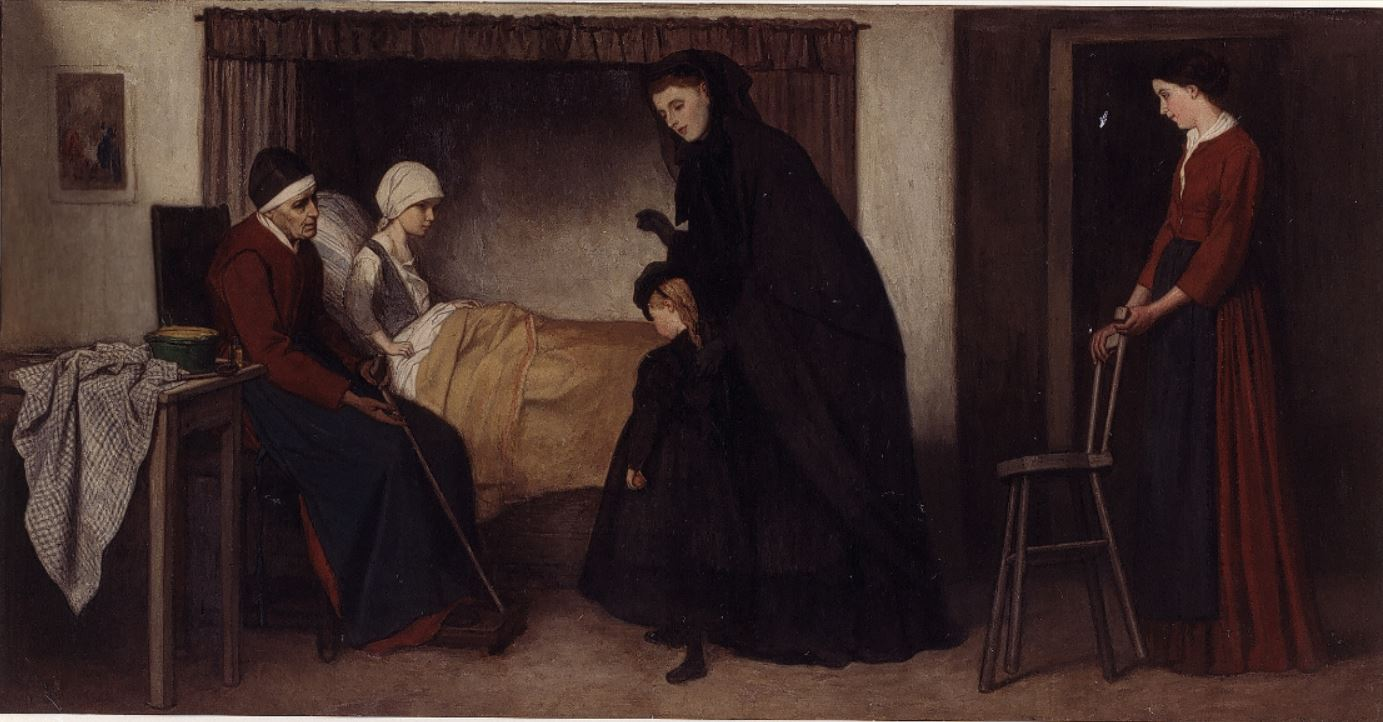
Charles de Groux, Visiting the sick

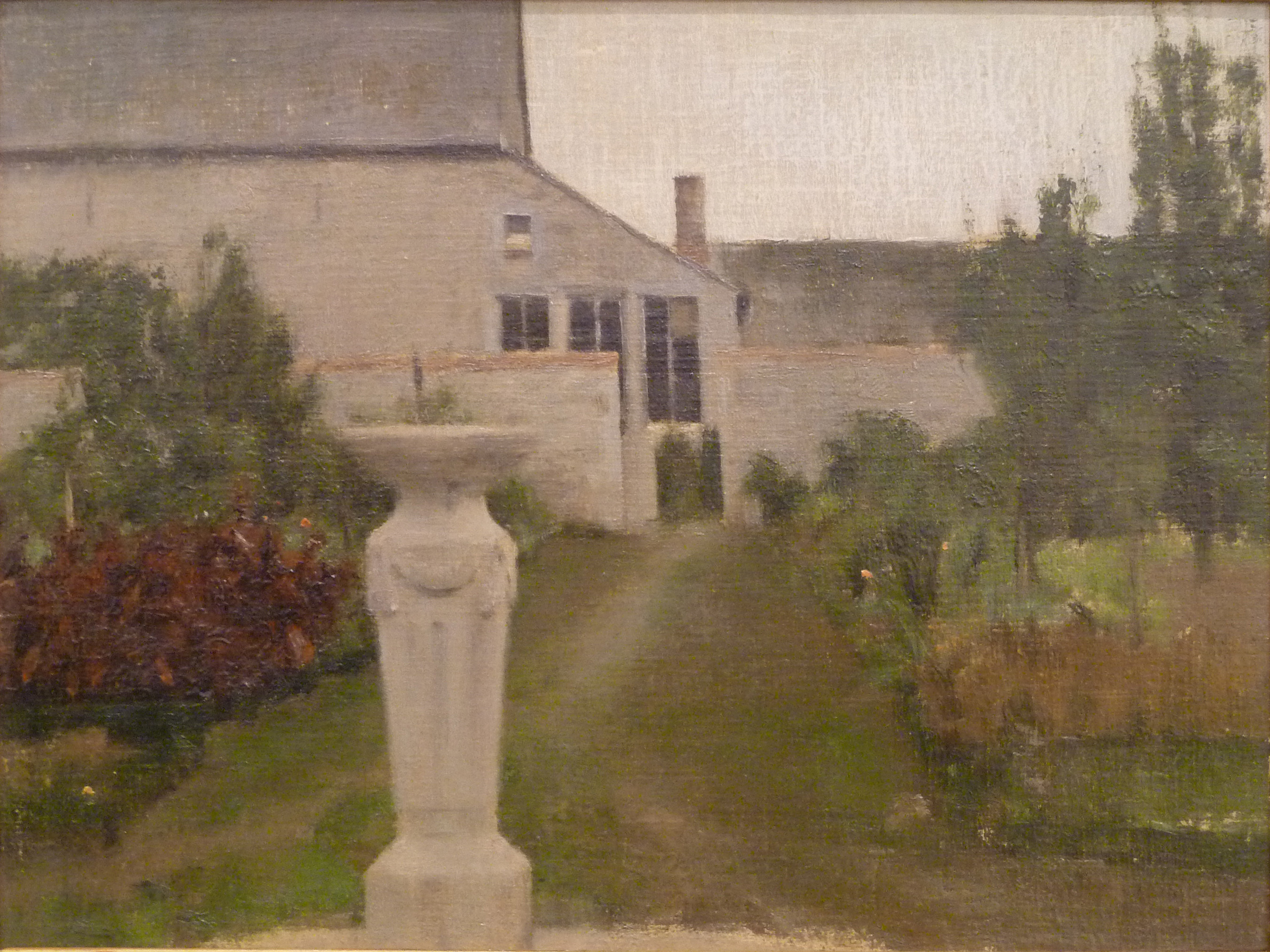
Fernand Khnopff, The garden

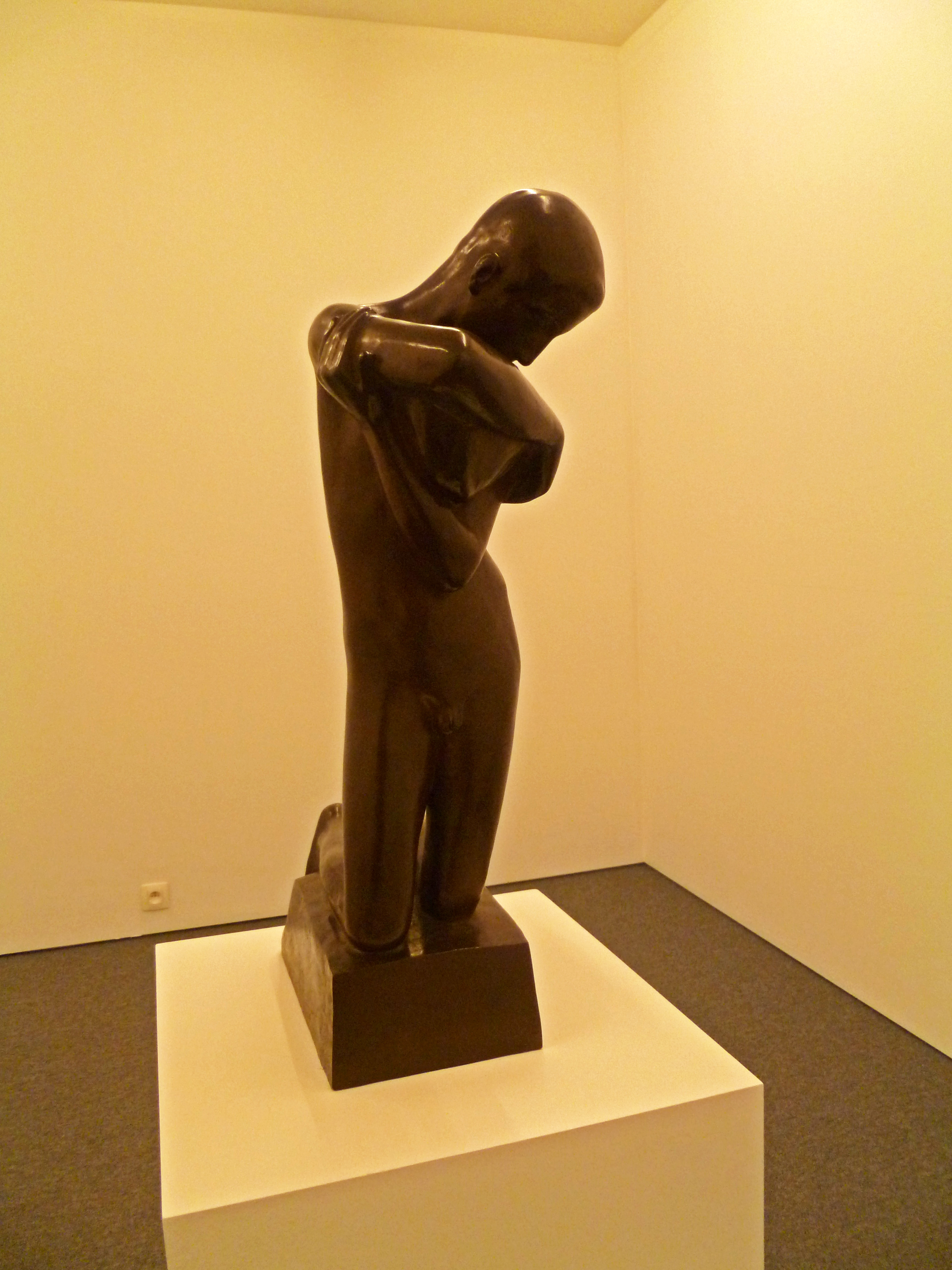
George Minne, 1898, Child with waterbag

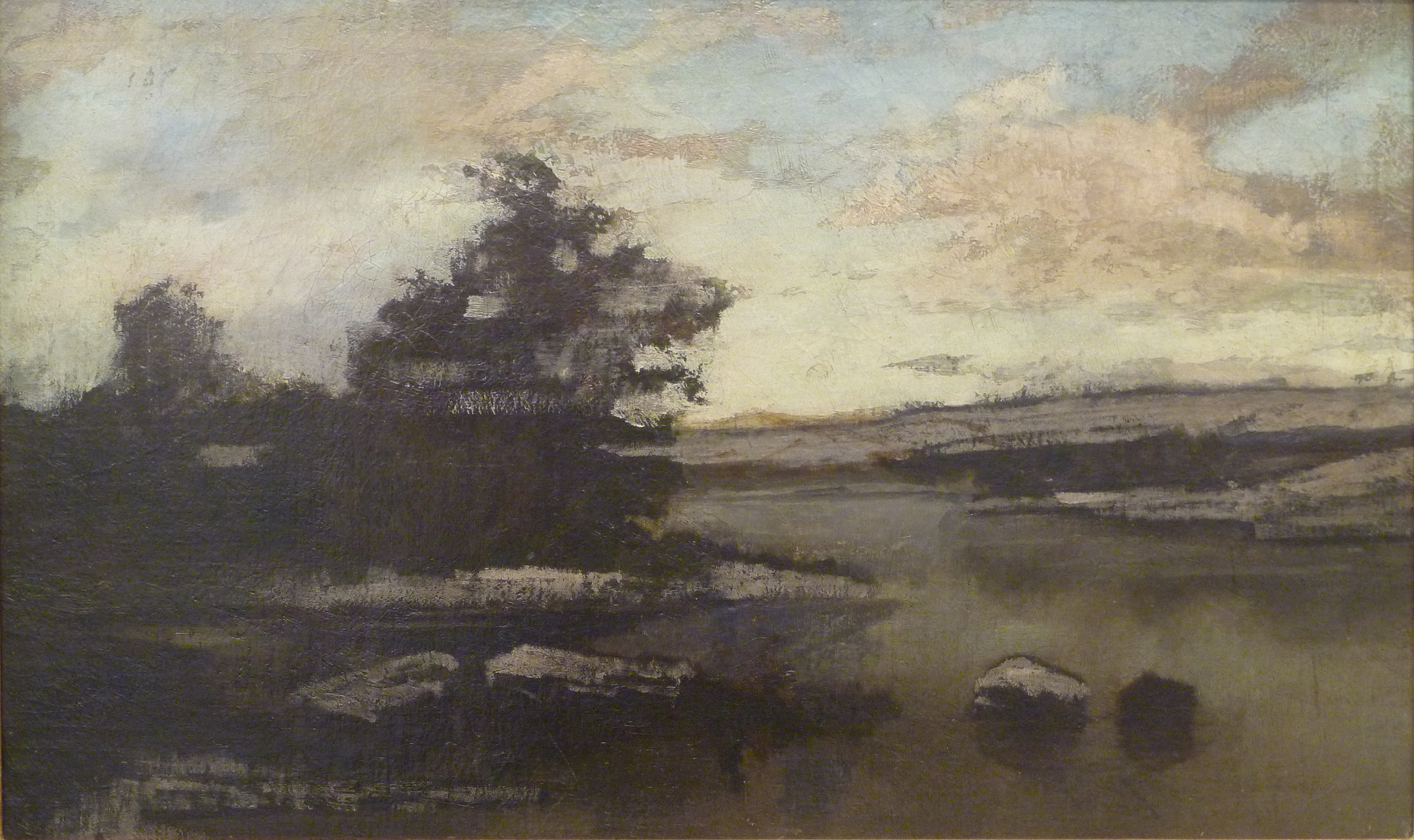
Félicien Rops, Snow in Thozée

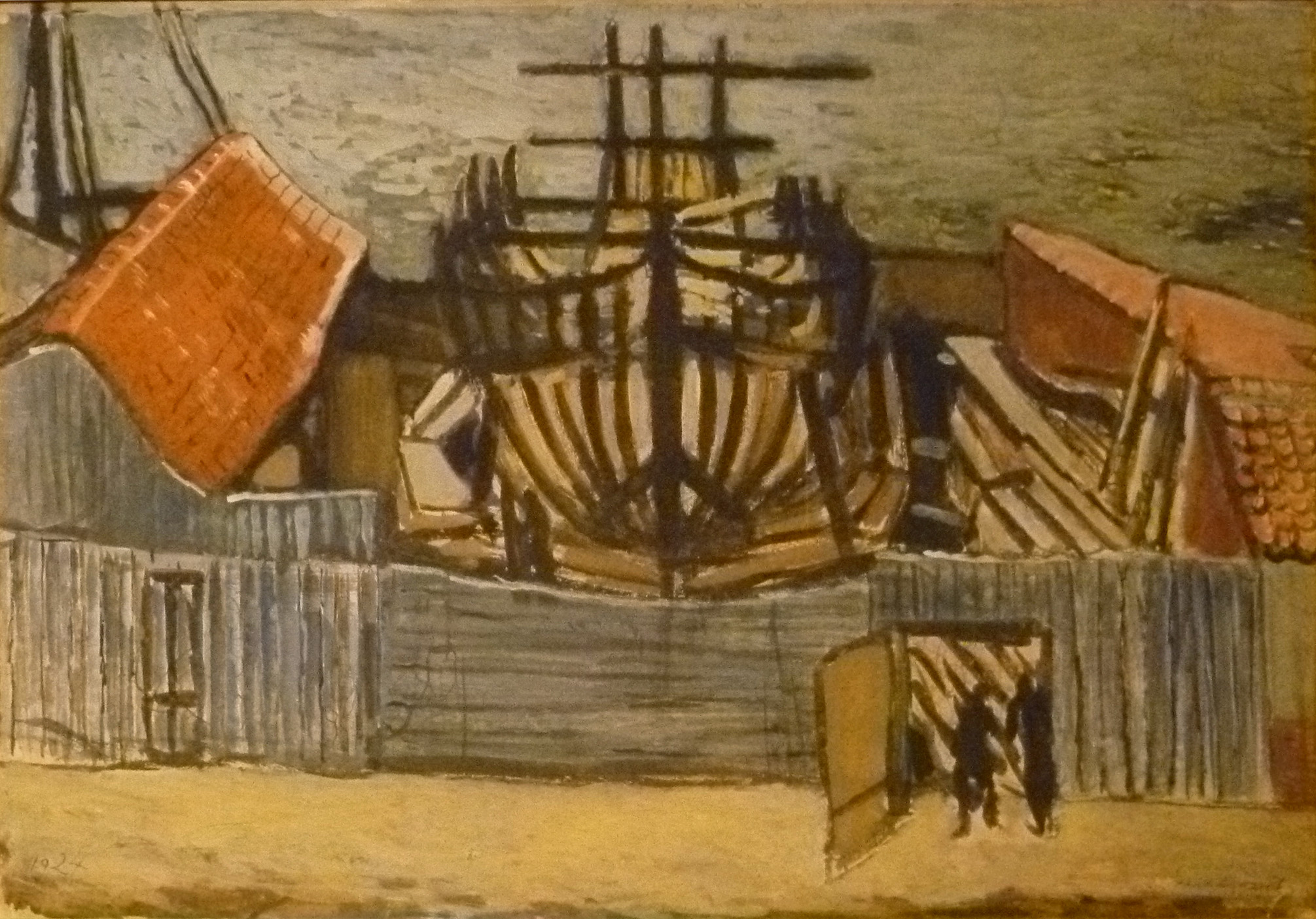
Léon Spilliaert, 1924, Shipyard in Ostend

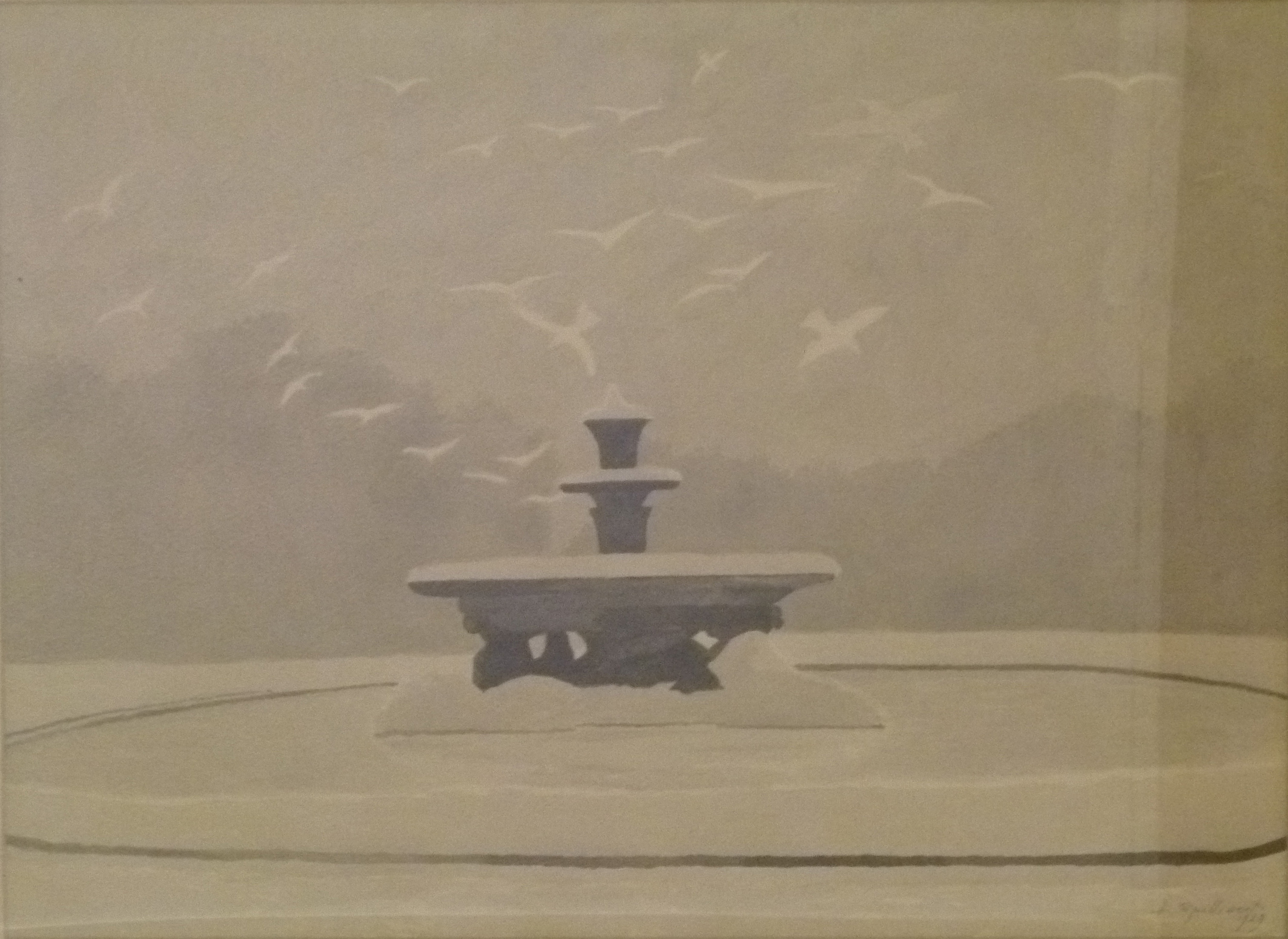
Léon Spilliaert, 1929, Fountain in the snow

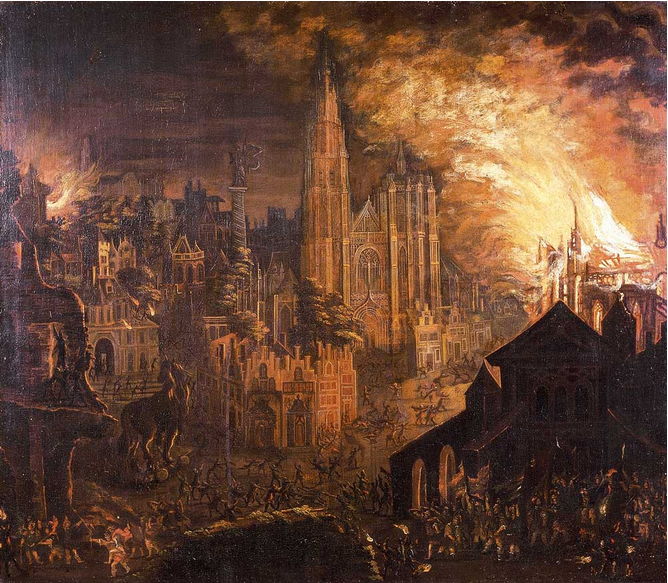
Daniel van Heil, Fire of Antwerp with the Trojan Horse
