= Armand Apol =

- Born: Armand Apol ca. 1879; Brussels, Belgium
- Died: ca. 1950; Brussels, Belgium
- Education: Art Academy of Brussels
- Occupations: Painter, etcher and lithographer

Armand-Adrien-Marie Apol (1879, Brussels – 1950, Brussels) was a Belgian painter, etcher and lithographer of Post-Impressionism.

== Biography ==
From 1891 to 1901, Armand Apol studied at the Art Academy of Brussels, from Constant Montald, among others. In 1901, he joined the artists' society Le Sillon, whose fellow members included Willem Paerels, Emile Thysebaert, Louis Thevenet, Georges Van Zevenberghen, Louise Brohée, Arthur Navez and J. Tordeur.

During World War I, he was a prisoner of war in Germany and after the war he lived for a time in Switzerland. In 1918, he had an individual exhibition there in Geneva at the Galerie Moos.

== Work ==
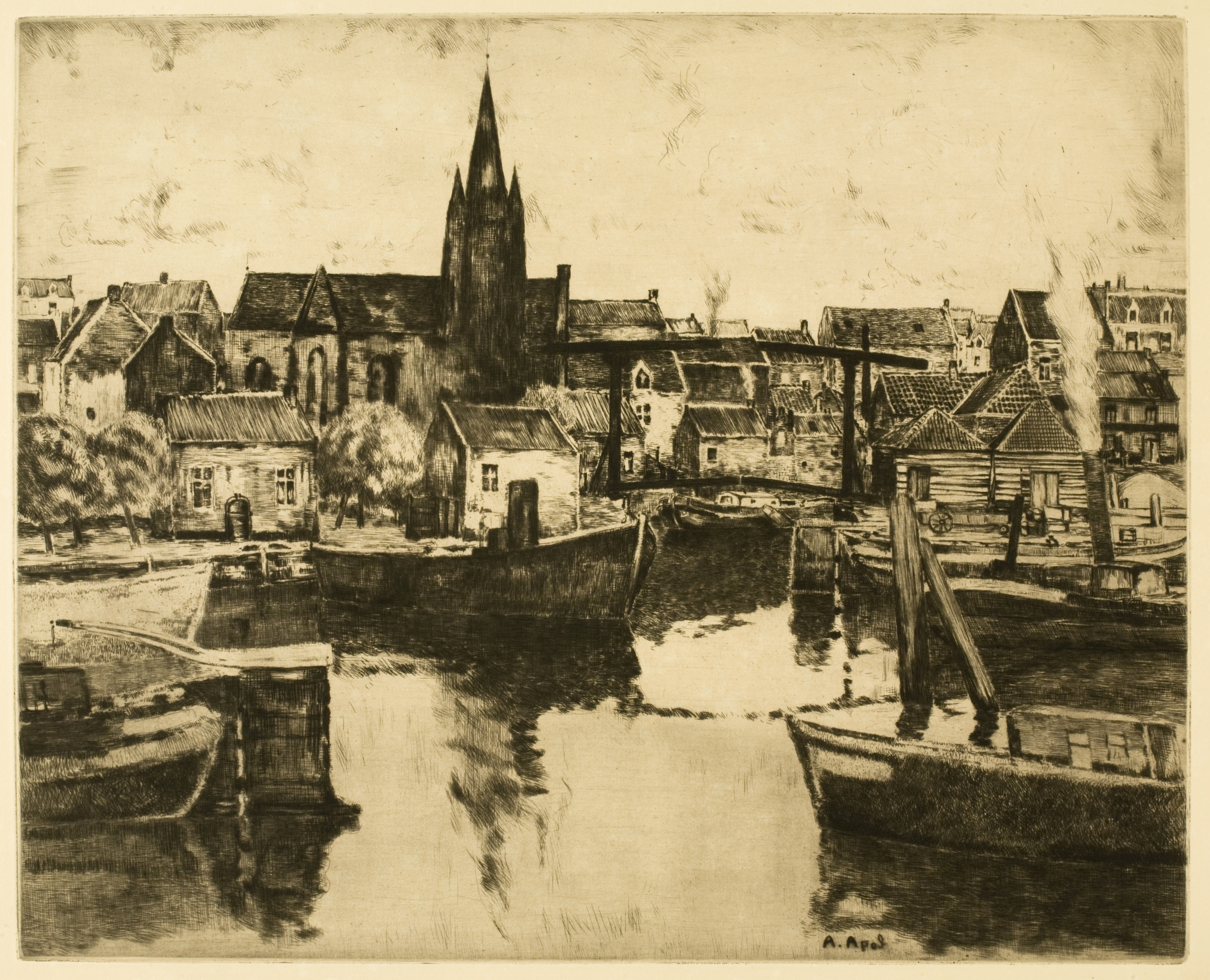
Small harbour in the Netherlands, engraving, collection Museum of Fine Arts, Ghent

Armand Apol painted landscapes, old city corners as well as seascapes in impressionist-realist style.

Apol often worked in old towns and villages like Bruges, Mechelen, Lissewege. He also worked along the North Sea beach and port cities painting sea, fishing boats and harbour business.

Apol was also graphic artist (etchings and lithographs) who, in addition to his own compositions, also executed copies after works by other masters, including those by Valerius De Saedeleer. Apol quickly grew into a commercially successful artist, promoting his work via group salons and individual exhibitions.

== Works ==
- Kasteel van Gaasbeek, printed image (1939)
- Vue sur le vieux port (Marseille), painting
- Étang à Clair marais, painting
- Vue générale de Bruxelles, printed image
- La Mare aux anguilles, painting
- La Sortie du village, painting
- La Mare, painting
- Nodebais, painting
