= Joseph Weterings =

Belgian writer, musicologist and music critic

Joseph Weterings (17 April 1904 – 9 May 1967) was a Belgian writer, musicologist and music critic. Weterings wrote poetry, plays and libretti for ballets and operas.

He was also director of the energy company Electrogaz in Brussels until 1966.

== Biography ==
His main interest as a literary author was the culture of antiquity. He worked with composers like Albert Roussel on his ballet Aeneas and an (unfinished) opera, Le Téméraire, or Karel Albert as well as Wladimir Vogel and Norbert Rosseau.

Some of his works were illustrated by Belgian painter Edgard Tytgat (see below).

Barely a year after his retirement from Electrogaz, he died at Seillans in the French department of Var, where he had taken up residence.

== Awards and honours ==
He was made Knight of the Order of Leopold.

== Works ==
- 1930 : Wagadus Untergang durch die Eitelkeit, oratorio, music by Wladimir Vogel (1930, reconstructed in 1948). based on an episode from Dausi, the tale of the Berber tribe, published by Leo Frobenius.
- 1935 : Albert Roussel, Aeneas: ballet in 1 act and 2 tableaux (Brussels, Palais des Beaux-Arts, July 31, 1935);
- 1936 : Jef Van Durme (1907–1965), Remous (opera libretto by J. Weterings);
- 1937 : Camera, ballet, music by Marcel Poot;
- 1938 : Henri Sauguet Les Ombres du Jardin: cantata for soloists, choir and orchestra. Dedicated to Paul Collaer. Created in Brussels, March 17, 1943, Société privée de musique de chambre, under the baton of Paul Collaer. French creation in Paris, Salle Gaveau, as a Concert de la Pléiade on June 28, 1943, with the Orchestre Hewitt directed by Maurice Hewitt, with Janine Micheau, Georges Jouatte, Henri Etcheverry and Pierre Nougaro. Éd. : Lyon : Symétrie;
- 1942 : Impressions de Belgique, poems illustrated by Edgard Tytgat, Désiré Acket, Nelly Degouy, Marcelle Meunier, Thomas Duez, J.P. Jacques de Dixmude, Alexandre Daoust, Joseph Hayez, Elisabeth Ivanowsky et Mark Severin, S.L., Armentor, 1942, gd 4°, 79 pages;
- 1943 : Le dit du routier, oratorio, music by Marcel Poot (1943);
- 1944 : Moretus ou le Damné récalcitrant: sotie in 4 acts, music by Marcel Poot, illustrated by Edgard Tytgat;
- 1944 : Raymond Chevreuille, Symphonie des souvenirs, for vocal quartet, reciter and orchestra "inspired by a poem by J. Weterings";
- 1945 : Het jaar Duizend / The year 1000, oratorio, music by Norbert Rosseau;
- 1947 : Elpénor (Roussel), a radio poem for flute and string quartet, op. 59, music by Albert Roussel on texts by Weterings and Roussel. Éditeur Durand. 44 Pages;
- 1947 : Catalogue de l'œuvre d'Albert Roussel, Paris & Bruxelles (catalogue established by Joseph Weterings with the help of Blanche Roussel, the composer's widow) : preceded by a poem by René Chalupt : 'Pour le soixantenaire', 5 avril 1929, homage to Albert Roussel, publication : Paris-Bruxelles : Editor, 1947;
- 1948 : Sicilienne, opera, music by Norbert Rosseau;
- 1949 : Europa ontvoerd, opera buffa, music by Karel Albert (1950);
- 1950 : Incantations, music by Norbert Rosseau;
- 1952 : À propos de Guy Huygens : a 27-page illustrated monography on Belgian painter Guy Huygens, with texts de Paul Caso, Robert Goffin, Maurice Lambilliote, Marcel Lecomte, Jan Walravens and Joseph Weterings, Éditions G.L.BRX;
- 1954 : Les Violons du Prince, chamber opera, music by Norbert Rosseau (new version in 1963);
- 1962 : Zodiaque : poems. Cover and hors-texte illustrated by Edgard Tytgat. Éditeur : A l'Enseigne des Quatre Vents, Anvers.
