= Vandekerckhove =

Vandekerckhove is a surname. Notable people with the surname include:

- Hans Vandekerckhove (born 1957), Belgian painter
- Joël Vandekerckhove, Belgian scientist and academic
