= Auguste Oleffe =

Belgian painter (1867–1931)

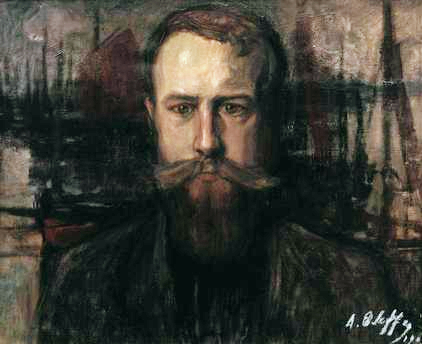
Self-portrait (c.1900)

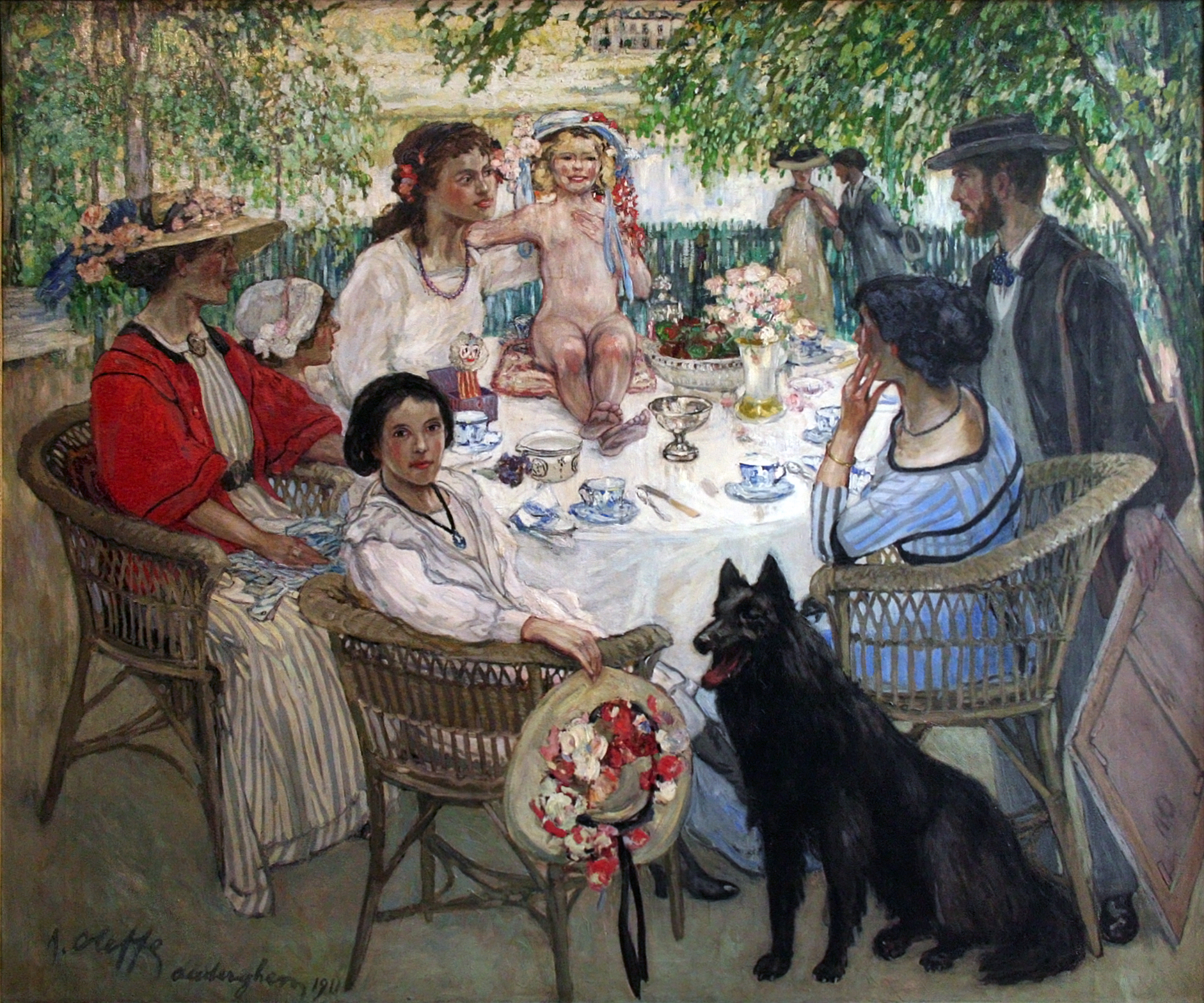
Spring (1911)

Auguste Charles Louis Oleffe (17 April 1867, Saint-Josse-ten-Noode – 13 November 1931, Auderghem) was a Belgian Impressionist painter. He is also associated with a type of Fauvism that originated in Brussels .

== Biography ==
He studied at the École de Dessin de Saint-Josse-ten-Noode and the Académie libre L'Effort. Upon completing his studies, he worked as a lithographer and draftsman. He visited Paris in 1890, to improve his skills.

He was married in 1891. From 1895 to 1902, he and his wife spent time with the still-life painter, Louis Thevenet, on the coast near Nieuwpoort, where he painted seascapes and the activities of the fishermen. In 1898, together with Thevenet, he created an artistic society known as Labeur. Its earliest members included Charles Dehoy, Willem Paerels and Ferdinand Schirren. Eventually, it had fifty members, but was disbanded in 1907.

In 1906, he settled in Auderghem; in a house he had acquired through an inheritance. There he painted portraits of his family members and friends from the art world, many of which were purchased by museums throughout Belgium.

After making friends with Rodolphe Strebelle in 1912, they established a circle of artists organized around his old school, L'Effort. The art critic, Paul Fierens, would later refer to the group as the "Brabant Fauvists", to distinguish them from the original "Parisian Fauvists", whose works employed brighter color contrasts.

Many Belgian artists were influenced by their style, including Anne-Pierre de Kat, Jean Brusselmans, and Rik Wouters, although he died before having a chance to develop it fully.

== Sources ==
- Pierre Loy, Rétrospective Auguste Oleffe : 1867-1931, exhibition catalog, Centre culturel d'Auderghem, 1972
- Serge Goyens de Heusch, L’impressionnisme et le fauvisme en Belgique, Fonds Mercator/Albin Michel, 1988 ISBN 978-90-615-3179-1
