= Thévenet =

Thévenet is a French surname. Notable people with the surname include:

- Alizee Thévenet (born 1990), French financial analyst, fiancée of James Middleton
- Bernard Thévenet (born 1948), French bicycle racer
- Cécile Thévenet (1872–?), Belgian opera singer
- Saint Claudine Thévenet (1774–1837), French religious woman
- Homero Alsina Thévenet (1922–2005), Uruguayan journalist and film critic
- Pierre-Louis Thévenet, American production designer, art director and set decorator
- Virginie Thévenet (born 1955), French actress and director
