= De Bruycker =

De Bruycker or De Bruyckere is a Flemish surname. It may be a habitational name for a person living in a marsh (Dutch: broek) or a nickname for a criminal, offender, lawbreaker (Dutch: breker "breaker"). Notable people with the surname include:

- Berlinde De Bruyckere (1964), Belgian contemporary artist
- Dylan de Bruycker (1997), Filipino footballer
- Jules De Bruycker (1870–1945), Belgian graphic artist, etcher, painter and draughtsman
