= Apol =

Apol is a surname. Notable people with the surname include:

- Armand Apol (1879–1950), Belgian painter, etcher and lithographer
- Barbara Gaardlykke Apol (born 1995), Faroese politician
- David J. Apol, American lawyer
- Louis Apol (1850–1936), Dutch painter
