= Louis Thevenet =

Belgian Painter

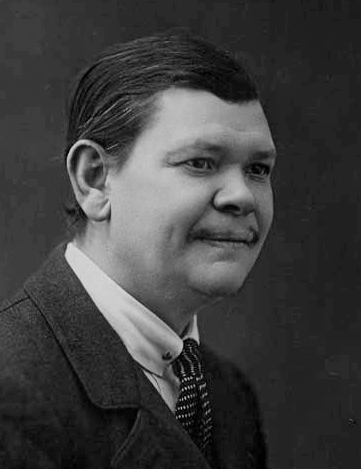
Louis Thevenet (date unknown)

Louis François Joseph Marie Thevenet (12 February 1874 in Bruges – 16 August 1930 in Halle) was a Belgian painter. He is best known for interior portraits and still-lifes.

== Biography ==
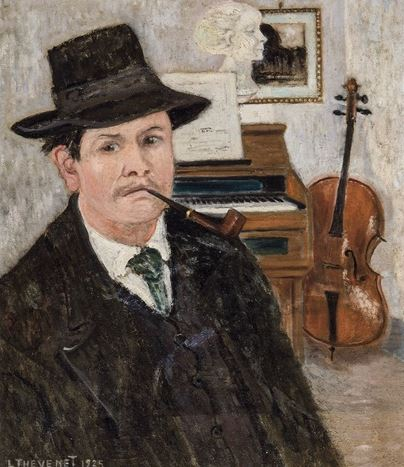
Self-portrait (1925)

He was the son of Alphonse Thevenet, originally from France, a music teacher and baritone, and his wife Anne Van Vyve. His brother Pierre also became a painter, and his sister Cécile was a singer at the Opéra-Comique.

When he was only two, his family moved to Brussels, where his father had been appointed organist at the Church of St. James on Coudenberg. There, he worked at several odd jobs, including errand boy, apprentice baker and assistant confectioner in a pastry shop. He also travelled on an English packet boat as an assistant cook and spent some time in Haiti. In 1896, he decided to became an artist; possibly influenced by his boyhood friend, Pierre Scoupreman.

From 1897 to 1903 he regularly stayed in Nieuwpoort, in the company of the painter Auguste Oleffe, his primary mentor. In 1898, he joined Oleffe in creating an artistic society known as Labeur. Its earliest members included Charles Dehoy, Willem Paerels and Ferdinand Schirren. Eventually, it had over fifty members, but it disbanded in 1907. His first exhibition came during this time, in 1906 at the "Salon des Indépendants" in Paris.

In 1908, he married Emma Tevels in Beersel. She would serve as a bookkeeper for his exhibitions. After four years without having children, they adopted Jeanne Mommaerts, when she was only a few days old. It was later learned that the adoption was never legally formalized. They settled in Halle in 1916, where they lived until his death. By 1925, they were able to build their own home. After 1928, he entered a period of decline, produced fewer paintings, and sold most of the ones he had.

He died at the age of fifty-six, from an apparent brain haemorrhage, and was interred in the city cemetery. His grave has since disappeared. In 1937, Emma sold their house and left Halle. A commemorative plaque was placed there in 1957. His paintings may be found in the Royal Museums of Fine Arts in Brussels and Antwerp, the Museum of Fine Arts, Ghent, the Museum of Ixelles and the Groeningemuseum in Bruges, among others.

== Selected paintings ==
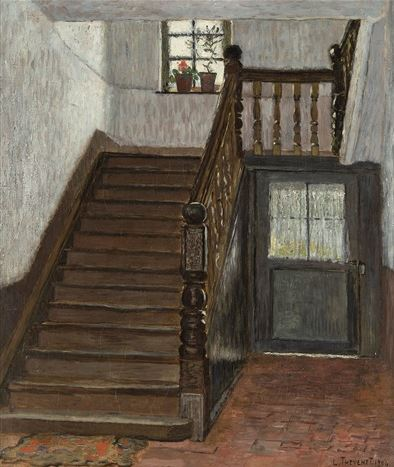
The Stairs

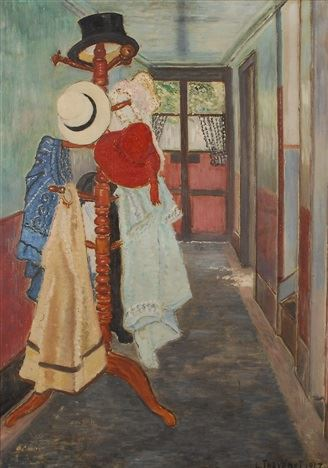
The Coat Rack

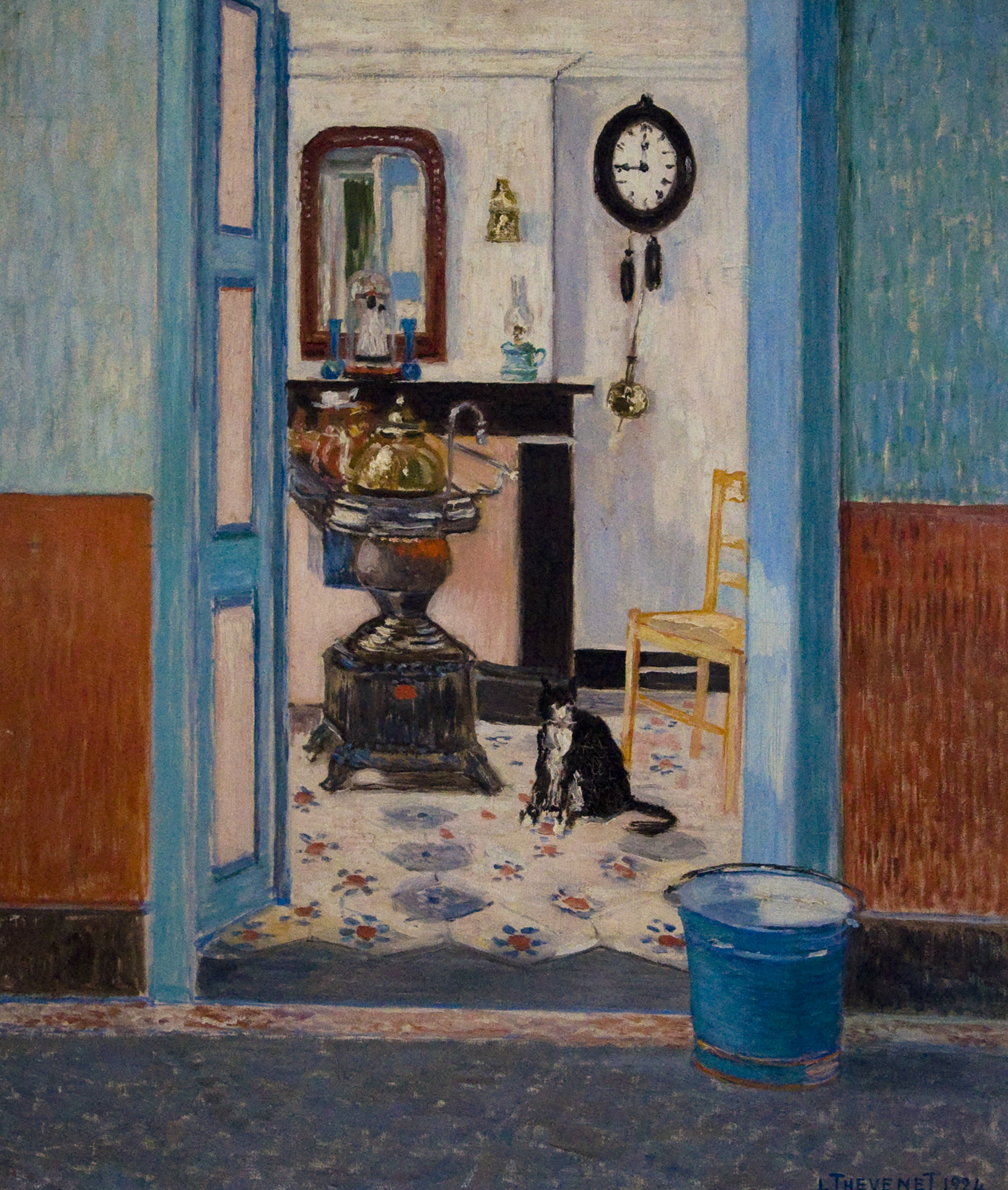
The Kitchen

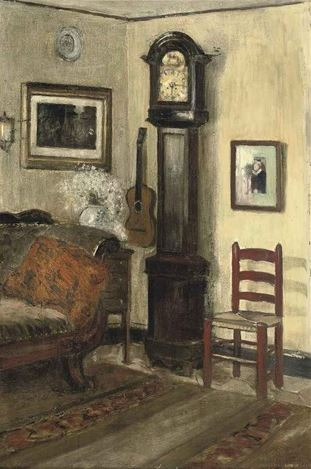
The Black Clock

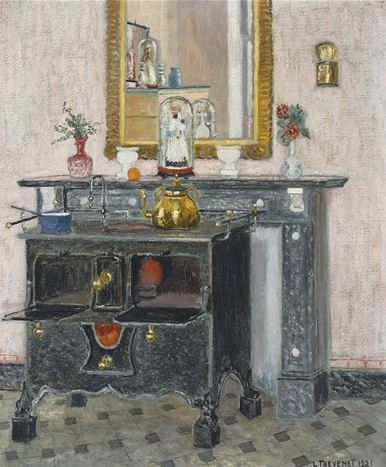
The Chimney
