= Charles Dehoy =

Belgian artist (1872–1940)

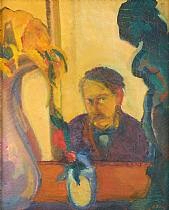
- Self-portrait (1920)
- Born: 14 April 1872; Brussels
- Died: 11 September 1940 (aged 68); Saint-Gilles

Charles Jean Dehoy (1872–1940) was a Belgian painter, watercolorist and etcher; associated with a group known as the "Brabant Fauvists". He was best known for his landscapes.

== Biography ==
He was the eldest child of Georges Dehoy (1850–1933), an upholsterer. At the age of fourteen his mother Mathilde, a seamstress, died. Over the following years, to help support his five siblings, he held numerous odd jobs, including errand boy, cobbler, saddler, and house painter. During that time, he also taught himself how to do oil painting.

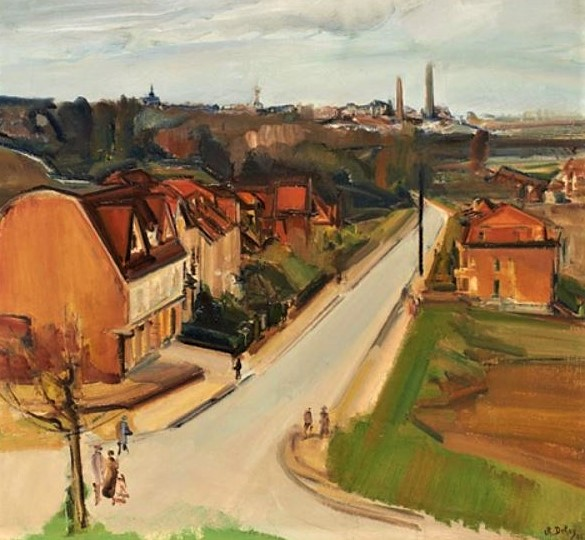
The Suburbs of Brussels (1935)

Around 1900, he and a friend took a trip through the south of France, which had a lasting influence on his work. That was where he painted his first landscapes. He exhibited some of them in Antwerp in 1901. It was during this time that he met the artist, Ferdinand Schirren, who became his mentor. As a result, he joined an artists' group named Labeur, which had been founded by Schirren's friend, Auguste Oleffe, in 1898. This, in turn, led to his participation in L'Effort, a co-operative art studio. These influences led him to change his style from Luminism to Fauvism.

Until 1905, in addition to painting, he did restorative work at a frame and canvas shop owned by his two brothers. At that time, he moved to Uccle; one of many moves he would make. From 1910, his works begin to show the influence of Paul Cézanne.

In 1912 Georges Giroux, the owner of a fashion boutique, opened an art gallery in Brussels. Dehoy and many of his associates were given individual exhibitions and contracts. Two years later, he took part in the last exhibition at La Libre Esthétique. By then, he was beginning to influence younger artists himself; notably Médard Verburgh and Jean Brusselmans. At an unknown date, he married his first cousin, Éléonore Joséphine Colson (1873–?). The marriage was childless.

During World War I, they remained in Belgium. In 1915, they bought a home with a studio in Laeken, on the canal. That same year, he met Paul Fierens, an art critic who would be one of his major supporters, and his works were exhibited at the Salon d'Automne. The following year, they were shown at the Salon des Indépendants. The year 1917 was spent at the artists' colony in Grimbergen. After the war, he joined the Cercle des XV, a society dedicated to reviving art. Some elements of Expressionism and Cubism may be noticed in his works from that period.

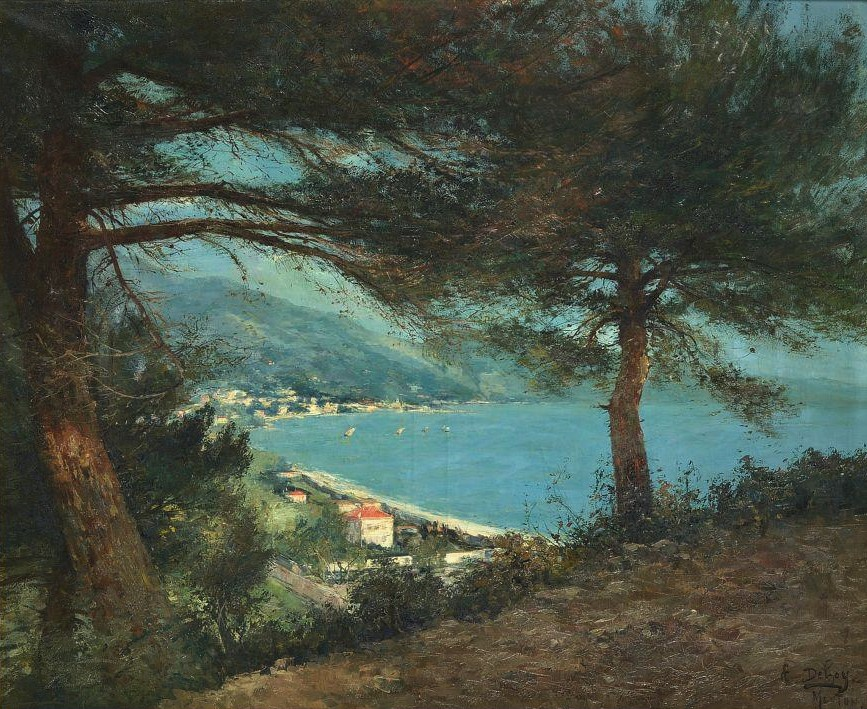
View of Menton (1926)

In 1925, his paintings took on a more serious tone. The following year was spent on the Côte d'Azur, creating views of Menton. From 1934 to 1938, he lived in Watermael-Boitsfort, and focused on depicting houses. His former home in Laeken became a frequent and prominent subject. In 1938, now ailing, he moved to a mansion in Saint-Gilles. He died there in 1940, aged 68.
