= Karel Albert =

Belgian composer

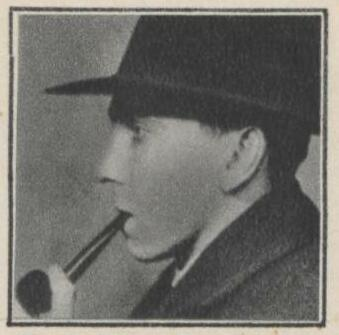
Image of Karel Albert

Karel Albert (16 April 1901 – 23 May 1987) was a Belgian composer, best known for his music for the theatre.

== Early life and education ==
Albert was born in Antwerp and studied initially at the Royal Conservatoire Antwerp, and later with Marinus de Jong.

== Career ==
From 1924 to 1933 he worked as musical adviser and conductor of the Vlaamsche Volkstooneel, later becoming an assistant director at the Flemish section of the Belgian National Broadcasting Service (NIR), Brussels, a post he held until his retirement in 1961.

After 1961 he worked as a music critic for the weekly paper Het toneel, and focused his attention on composition. He was best known for the stage music he composed for the Vlaams Volkstoneel and the Théâtre du Marais in Brussels.

== Death ==
He died in Liedekerke in 1987.

== Style ==
Albert's earlier music, much of which was written under the pseudonym "K. Victors", was close to the expressionist style of Arnold Schoenberg, though Albert preferred the term "constructivist", referring to his work as "music that strived to be pure music, lines that represent nothing more or less than a plastic value". These "constructions", meant to realise a "community art", began to appear as early as 1922, though most characteristically they belong to the period from 1926 to 1937. During the early 1940s he gradually evolved toward a more traditional, neoclassical style. The last phase of his composition was marked by a turn to atonality and serialism.

Albert first began to explore twelve-tone technique in the second movement of his Quintet for flute, oboe, and string trio (1954), and intensified this tendency in the Theme and Variations for piano (1955), Third Sonata for piano (1956), and Bloeiende lotus (1956), finally forming a complete work on a twelve-tone row with the orchestral work De nacht (1956), followed by the Suite for orchestra (1958) and a succession of chamber music pieces and songs.

== Compositions ==
- Serenade, for piano (1921)
- Serenade, for oboe and piano (1921)
- Sonata No. 1, for piano (1922)
- Marieken van Niemeghen, incidental music (first version) (1924)
- Sonatina No. 1, for piano (1924)
- Tijl, incidental music (1925)
- Les marrons du feu, incidental music (1925)
- Lucifer, incidental music (1926)
- Adam in ballingschap, incidental music (1927)
- De Mariaboodschap, incidental music (1927)
- Sonata No. 2, in G major, for piano (1927)
- Marieken van Niemeghen, incidental music (second version) (1928)
- String Quartet No. 1, in A minor (1929)
- Trio for oboe, clarinet, and bassoon (1930)
- Chamber Symphony (1932)
- Jeremias, incidental music (1932)
- Wilde jacht, for orchestra (1933)
- Humoresque, for orchestra (1936)
- Het land, for orchestra (1937)
- Symphony No. 1 (1941)
- String Quartet No. 2, in D major (1941)
- Symphony No. 2 (1943)
- Terug, for bass and piano (1944)
- Symphony No. 3 (1945)
- Europa ontvoerd, opera buffa on a libretto by Joseph Weterings (1950)
- Sonatina No. 2, for piano (1951)
- Quintet, for flute, oboe, violin, viola, and cello (1954)
- Theme and Variations, for piano (1955)
- Sonata No. 3, for piano (1956)
- Suite, for orchestra (1958)
- Werkstuk for viola and wind quintet or piano (1958)
- Drie constructies [Three Constructions] for string orchestra (1959)
- Quartet, for four saxophones (1960)
- In den beginne was het woord, for orchestra (1962)
- Quartet for Brass (1964)
- Symphony No. 4 (1966)
- Sinfonietta (1968)
- Sonatina No. 4, for piano (1973)
- Sonatina No. 5, for piano (1979)
- Sonatina No. 6, for piano (1984)
