= Arthur Navez =

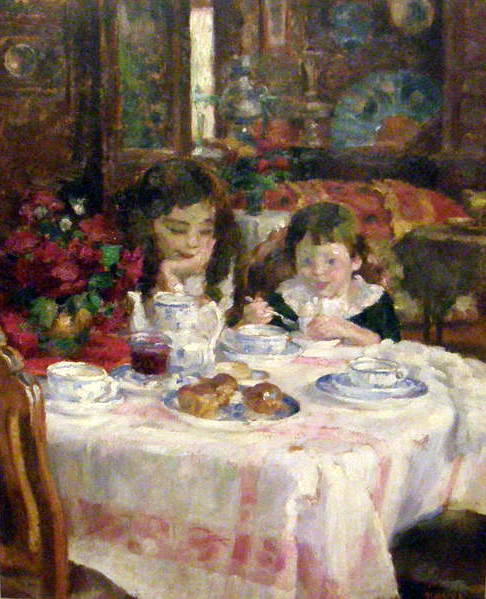
Sunday morning breakfast (near 1915).

Arthur Navez (1881 in Ghent – 1931 near Brussels) was a Belgian painter belonging to the fauvist movement.
