= Joël Vandekerckhove =

Belgian molecular biologist

Joël Vandekerckhove is a Belgian molecular biologist and professor at the University of Ghent (Ghent, Belgium). He is the head of the VIB Department of Medical Protein Research, UGent.

His research department works on functional proteomics: development and applications, molecular cell biology and biochemistry of the actin cytoskeleton, cell biology and biochemistry of the actin cytoskeleton, cytokine signalling, and molecular and metabolic signalling.

Research at the department led to the university spin-off biotech company Peakadilly.

== Sources ==
- Department of Medical Protein Research
- Proteomics and Bioinformatics Group
- Joël Vandekerckhove
