= Cécile Thévenet =

Belgian opera singer

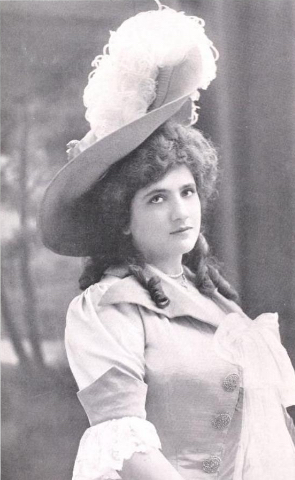
- Cécile Thévenet, as Charlotte in Werther, from a 1905 publication.
- Born: 22 November 1872; Bruges
- Died: 15 March 1956 (aged 83); Meudon
- Other name: Cécilie Thévenet
- Occupation: opera singer

Cécile Thévenet (1872–1956) was a Belgian opera singer.

== Early life ==
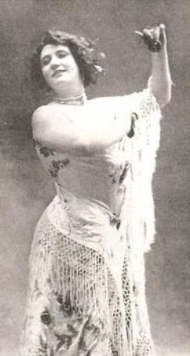
Cécile Thévenet, in costume for Carmen, from a 1905 publication.

Cécile Thévenet was born in Bruges, the daughter of Alphonse Thévenet and Anne Van Vyve. Her father was a music teacher and baritone singer. She was raised and educated in Brussels. Her brothers Pierre (1870–1937) and Louis (1874–1930) became painters.

== Career ==
Cécile Thévenet sang with the Opéra-Comique in Paris. "Alike as a singer and an actress Mlle. Thévenet is a very great artist, a wonderfully clever creator of the characters she represents", commented one American publication in 1905. In 1913 she sang the part of Euryclea in the premiere of Gabriel Fauré's Pénélope in Paris, with Lucienne Bréval in the title role. She was also in the original cast of the Gustave Charpentier opera Julien, in 1913. She was known for her performances of Carmen.

Other roles Thévenet sang included Musette in Leoncavallo's La bohéme (1899), Leoncavallo's Zaza (1900), Caroline in Die Fledermaus (1904), La Chouanne (1907), the Nurse in Paul Dukas's Ariane et Barbe-bleue (1910), and Massenet's Thérèse (1913).
