= Sam Dillemans =

Belgian painter

- Born: 17 January 1965 (age 60); Leuven, Belgium
- Website: www.sam-dillemans.com

Sam Dillemans (born 17 January 1965) is a Belgian painter.

== Background ==
Sam Dillemans was born in Leuven, Flemish Brabant, Flanders, Belgium. After high school, Dillemans studied at several academies in Belgium and abroad. He obtained the French Higher National diploma of Plastic Expression Option Art. For some years he has been teaching drawing and painting at the Antwerp Royal Academy of Fine Arts in Antwerp and was a guest professor at the Higher Institute for Fine Arts of Flanders, also in Antwerp. He now lives and works in Borgerhout, Antwerp.

A documentary about his work and life, The Madness of Detail, was entered in the "Creative Documentary" category at the 21st International Festival of Audiovisual Programmes held in Biarritz, France in January 2008. and won the FIPA d'Or for best creative documentary.

== Work ==
The work of Dillemans has deep roots in European painting tradition. According to Dillemans, painters such as Vincent van Gogh, Peter Paul Rubens, Jean Auguste Dominique Ingres and Pablo Picasso are not artists of the past, but artists of today and they continue inspire him in his work. To Dillemans it does not matter when something was painted, but how it was painted. The method of painting, how paint and brushes are used to seek or construct a striking image, is timeless.

His work is a quest to find the visual equivalent for the complex interaction between imagination, feeling, consciousness and the painting technique itself. To achieve this goal, Dillemans says, painters have a difficult and at times tedious task to fulfill. They cannot not be satisfied with the clear perception of reality as an evidence of truth, but must try harder to understand more fully their subjects. With thick strokes and an impressive relief on the surface, Dillemans's style contains a refined form of elasticity and plasticity.

The process of creation is an important aspect in his work. During this process the paintings appear at times to become gradually more abstract. Dillemans is convinced that a painting only has a chance to take form once the paint begins to take on a life of its own. This style is more firmly rooted in the European tradition rather than that of abstract expressionism and although the strokes become autonomous and follow their own logic, the final form stills holds true to a recognizable and even classical form. Modernism, classicism and academism seem to come together in his work without any contradiction among the styles.

== World vision ==
Dillemans's world vision is rather sombre. He works intensively and there is much action and movement within his work and in this way his painting becomes an intense occupation. Many painters of the past were also occupied by this same endeavour. Dillemans states that, "a painter like Ingres drew on his right to be taken seriously. In his case it is about a beautiful aristocratic seriousness which has nothing to do with self glorification. Proof of this is that he was still copying Michelangelo at the age of sixty five."

== Stages ==
Because of his prolific work and creativity, Dillemans's output has already passed through several different stages. During the period from 1993 to 2000, he did an intensive study of the female portrait, at times using his wife as a model. A second period from 2000 to 2003 was a period of reflection during which he studied the old masters. This phase would also influence his later work. From 2003 onward he began a pugilistic painting project with numerous boxing scenes in which a rhythmical movement between individual figures and the presence of physical bodies are in constant dialogue with the baroque. He also began a series of portraits of well known figures who he admires including Ingres and the Belgian cyclist Eddy Merckx.
