= Désiré Acket =

Belgian painter

Personal information
- Nationality: Belgian
- Born: 4 May 1905 Antwerp, Belgium
- Died: 29 July 1987 (aged 82) Antwerp, Belgium
- Relatives: Nelly Degouy, wife

Sport
- Sport: Arts

Désiré Antoine Acket (4 May 1905 – 29 July 1987) was a Belgian painter, wood engraver and bookbinding designer. He competed in the 1932 Summer Olympics.
