= Nelly Degouy =

Belgian painter (1910–1979)

- Born: 16 March 1910; Antwerp, Belgium
- Died: 28 November 1979 (aged 69); Antwerp, Belgium
- Occupation: Painter
- Spouse: Désiré Acket

Nelly Degouy (16 March 1910 – 28 November 1979) was a Belgian painter. Her work was part of the painting event in the art competition at the 1932 Summer Olympics.
