= Marthe Wéry =

Belgian painter

Marthe Wéry (1930–2005) was a Belgian painter.

Wéry was born in Etterbeek in 1930. She studied at the Académie de la Grande Chaumière and at Stanley William Hayter's Atelier 17. Her first solo exhibition was held in 1965 at the Galerie Saint-Laurent. Wéry had an abstract style, and was inspired by minimalism and Wladislaw Strzemiński's Unism. In the 1970s she experimented with monochrome, and returned to using color when her work was exhibited at the Venice Biennale in 1982. Several solo exhibitions of her work were also held in the 1990s and early 2000s. Her works are held by several museums, and are displayed in the Royal Palace in Brussels.

Wéry died in Brussels in 2005.
