= Hans Vandekerckhove =

Belgian painter

Hans Vandekerckhove (1957, Kortrijk) is a Belgian painter, living and working in Ghent. From 1975 to 1997 Vandekerckhove studied Art History at University Ghent, where he wrote his graduation thesis on David Hockney.

== Exhibitions ==
=== Solo exhibitions ===
2020

- Voltaire's Advice, Tatjana Pieters, Ghent (BE)

2018

- Another Portrait of an Artist, Art4Museum, Moscow (RUS)

2017

- The Christina Paintings, NK Gallery, Antwerp (BE)

2015

- Gimme Shelter, NK Gallery, Antwerp (BE)

2013

- Something in the Water does not compute, NK Gallery, Antwerp (BE)

2011

- Tears in Rain, Galerie Van De Weghe, Antwerp (BE)

2009

- Watching the Architects, Galerie Van de Weghe, Antwerp (BE)
- Picture Palace, Zebrastraat, Stichting Liedts-Meesen, Ghent (BE)
- Paintings 1986–2007, Deweer Art, Otegem (BE)

2008

- Recent Paintings, Galerie Hof&Huyser, Amsterdam (NL)

2007

- La mirada ciega. Un diálogo entre Hans Vandekerckhove y Juan Muñoz, Fundaciòn Carlos de Ambères, Madrid (ES)
- Recent Paintings, Deweer Art, Otegem (BE)
- My Head is my only Home, bookpresentation with selection of paintings, SMAK, Ghent (BE)

2005

- Recent paintings, Galerie Le Besset, St. Jeure d’Andaure (FR)

2004

- Stalking Hiëronymus, with Anselm Kiefer and Penck, Mu.Zee, Ostend (BE)
- Recent paintings, Deweer Art Gallery, Otegem (BE)

2003

- Recent paintings, Hof&Huyser, Amsterdam (NL)
- Stalking Hiëronymus, Mercator Insurance Gallery, Antwerp (BE)

2001

- Een verzamelaar van verdwenen blikken / A Collector of vanished Looks, Elzenveld, Antwerp (BE)
- Vast geluk en vloeibare vreugde / Firm Luck and liquid Joy, Hof&Huyser, Amsterdam (NL)
- Schilderijen ter vervolmaking van methoden van onbeweeglijkheid, Deweer Art, Otegem (BE)

1998

- Hunker Bunker Tuin, Deweer Art, Otegem (BE)

1996

- Recent Paintings, Deweer Art, Otegem (BE)

1995

- Mirror, Mirror Me, De Warande, Turnhout (BE)

1993

- Watt / Schloss, Stichting Veranneman, Kruishoutem (BE)
- Hortus Conclusus / Türhüter, Deweer Art, Otegem (BE)

1991

- Hetaera Esmeralda, Deweer Art, Otegem (BE)

1990

- VMHK, Vereniging Museum Hedendaagse Kunst, Ghent (BE)
- Kunst Europa, Museum Xanten, Xanten (DE)

1989

- illumination, Vera Van Laer Gallery, Knokke / Antwerp (BE)

1988

- Apocalypsis cum Figuris, Deweer Art, Otegem (BE)
- Paintings, Galerie Van Esch, Eindhoven (NL)

1987

- Paintings and collages, Vlaams Cultuurhuis De Brakke Grond, Amsterdam (NL)
- Paintings, Christine Colmant Art Gallery, Brussels (BE)
- Paintings, Galerie S.&H. De Buck, Ghent (BE)

=== Group exhibitions ===
2020

- Art Autun#2020, Rien ne se perd, rien ne se crée, tout se transforme, curated by Reniere & Depla, Musée Rolin and Panopticum, Autun, Bourgogne (FR)

2019

- A Provisional Legacy, The Apocryphal Cabinet of the Adornes, curated by Reniere & Depla, Adornes Domain, Bruges (BE)

2018

- FACES, Psychiatrisch Centrum St. Amandus, Beernem, (BE)

2017

- Between Heaven and Earth II, Huis de Lombart Bruges – PAK, Bruges (BE)
- ART in Motion, collection presentation, Phoebus Foundation HeadquARTers, Antwerp (BE)

2016

- Water.War, Budafabriek, Kortrijk (BE)

2014

- De Boom en de Mens, Museum de Mindere, St. Truiden (BE)
- Health – something of value; Lokettenzaal -Nationale Bank België, Brussels (BE)

2013

- Now and Then, Central Bank of Europe CBE, Frankfurt (DE)

2012

- Artists of the gallery, Galerie Dukan Hourdequin, Paris (FR)

2010

- Mars op Oostende / Public Private Paintings, Mu.zee, Ostend (BE)

2009

- Galerie Van De Weghe, Antwerp (BE)
- Hof&Huyser, Amsterdam (NL)

2008

- Der eigene Weg. Perspektiven belgischer Kunst / Doing it my way. Perspectives on Belgian art, MKM Museum Küppersmühle für Moderne Kunst, Duisburg (DE)
- Stimulans, BROELMUSEUM, Kortrijk (BE)
- Nature: Attitude, Aspekte Internationaler Fotografie und Malerei, Samuelis Baumgarte Galerie, Bielefeld (DE)

2007

- Passie voor het ongrijpbare, Museum Minderbroeders St.-Truiden (BE)

2005

- Soul, Grootseminarie Bruges (BE)
- Verfraaiing; 12 comments on 12 collection items, Lieven Debrauwer (cineast) comments 'Jarman' (1996, O/C), Stadshallen Bruges (BE)

2004

- Preview, Galerie am Mondsee, Salzburg (AU)
- Eclips, Deweer Art, 25th anniversary show, Transfo Zwevegem (BE)

2003

- Sakrale Kunst, Cultureel Centrum Hasselt (BE)

2001

- De Tuinen van Granada / The Gardens of Granada, Mu.ZEE, Ostend (BE)
- Acquisitions, Mu.ZEE, Ostend (BE)

2000

- Contemporary Art of Belgium, Central Bank of Europe CBE, Frankfurt (DE)
- Multiple Choices, Deweer Art, Otegem (BE)
- Artists of the gallery, Hof&Huyser, Amsterdam (BE)

1999

- Art Concern, Kortrijk (BE)

1996

- Beeld-ding, Museum van Bommel-Van Dam, Venlo (NL)
- Confrontations, Traveling exhibition : Dublin, Johannesburg, Luxemburg, Brussels, Antwerpen, ....
- L’Iconicité de l’Image, Aguas Gallery, Bordeaux (FR)

1991

- Modernism in Painting, Mu.ZEE, Ostend (BE)

== Collections ==
- C&A Services Brussels (BE)
- S.M.A.K. Ghent (BE)
- Central Bank of Europe, ECB Frankfurt (DE)
- Belfius Art Collection (BE)
- Province of East Flanders (BE)
- Flemish Government (BE)
- Fortis Bank and Insurances (NL / SP)
- Kaderschool Best (NL)
- The Phoebus Foundation (BE)
- Museum Minden (DE)
- APG (NL)
- Mu.ZEE Ostend (BE)
- Museum Kortrijk (BE)
- Nestlé (DE)
- National Bank of Belgium (BE)
- Nordstern Köln (DE)
- University of Antwerp (BE)
- Foundation Liedts- Meesen (BE)
- FOD, Brussels (BE)
- Dela Art Collection (NL)
- Province of West Flanders (BE)

== Publications ==
Several books have been written about Vandekerckhove:

- Roelstraete, Dieter (2007). Hans Vandekerckhove: My Head Is My Only Home. Amsterdam: Ludion. ISBN 978-90-5544-666-7.
- Depondt, Paul (2009). Picture Palace. Centraal Boekhuis. ISBN 978-90-209-8362-3.

The experimental film and videomaker Svend Thomsen, founder of Artcinema OFFOFF, turned Picture Palace into a documentary.
