= Ferdinand Schirren =

Belgian artist

Ferdinand Schirren (8 November 1872, Antwerp - 19 February 1944, Brussels) was a Belgian painter, watercolorist and sculptor of Jewish ancestry.

== Biography ==
He was the sixth child and first son born to Josephe Schirren, a copper worker, and his wife Anna née Mendelsohn. Originally from Odessa, they emigrated to Antwerp by way of Riga in 1864. Shortly after his birth, they moved to Anderlecht. He expressed his desire to become an artist at an early age, and received their support.

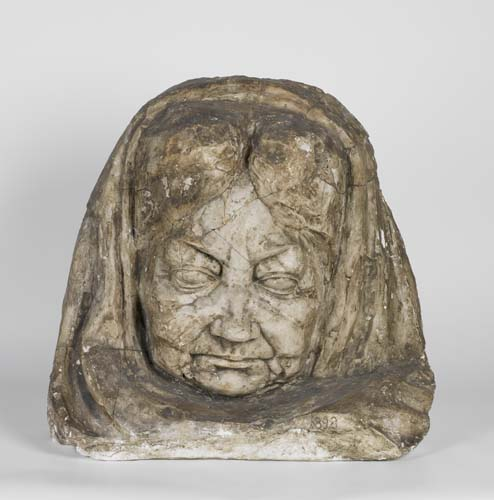
Helena Blavatsky

From 1884 to 1885, he took night classes at the local drawing school. Then, from 1887 to 1894, he was a full-time student at the Royal Academy of Fine Arts, Brussels. His primary instructor there was Joseph Stallaert. During the academic year of 1892–1893, he studied sculpture with Jean-Baptiste De Keyser (1857–1927). After graduating, he was employed in the studios of Jef Lambeaux, an early member of Les XX, a progressive artists' co-operative. He set up his own studio in 1896.

In 1898, he became one of the first members of Labeur, an art association created by the painters Auguste Oleffe and Louis Thevenet. For a time, he was the only sculptor in the group. His contribution to their first exhibition was a bust of the Theosophist, Helena Blavatsky. At the exhibition of 1902, he presented an experimental children's bust inspired by Pointillism. The critical response was so harshly negative that he went into a depression and destroyed most of his works in 1903. The following year, he and his wife Maria settled in the small town of Linkebeek. At the suggestion of his family doctor, he concentrated on drawing and painting, but continued to create the occasional sculpture.

There, he became associated with a group that would later be known as the Brabant Fauvists. After 1906, he focused on watercolors. By 1912, he had returned to Brussels and was holding his own individual exhibitions. His largest exhibition came in 1917 at the Galerie Georges Giroux and was very successful. Giroux offered him an exclusive contract but, despite having financial problems, he declined as he felt it would limit his artistic freedom.

In 1919, he left his wife for his favorite model, Yvonne Esser (1900–1973). Eventually, they married and had two children. Their son Fernand became a composer and musician. From 1920 to 1922, they lived in France, near Nogent-sur-Marne, then returned to Brussels. From this point on, almost all of his works were watercolors, with family themes. In the 1930s, he began using india ink to define his painting's contours.

During World War II, with the help of friends, he and his family lived hidden away in a villa in Berchem-Sainte-Agathe. They were able to avoid detection and he died of natural causes (a heart attack) in 1944, at the age of seventy-one.

== Selected paintings ==
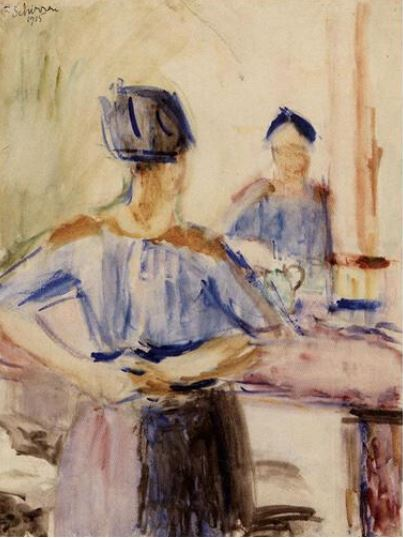
A Woman at the Mirror

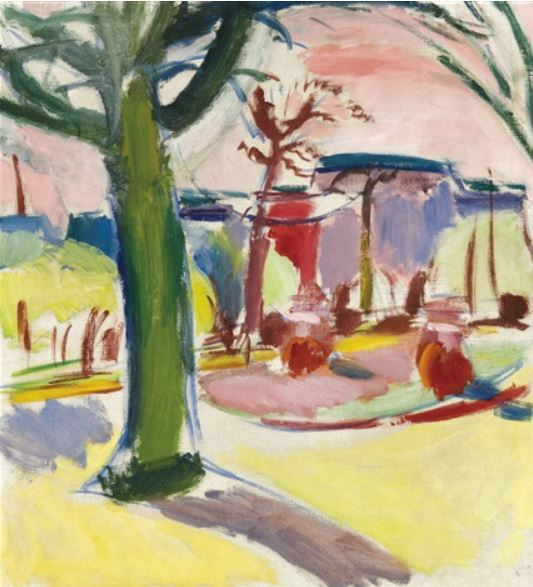
Under the Trees

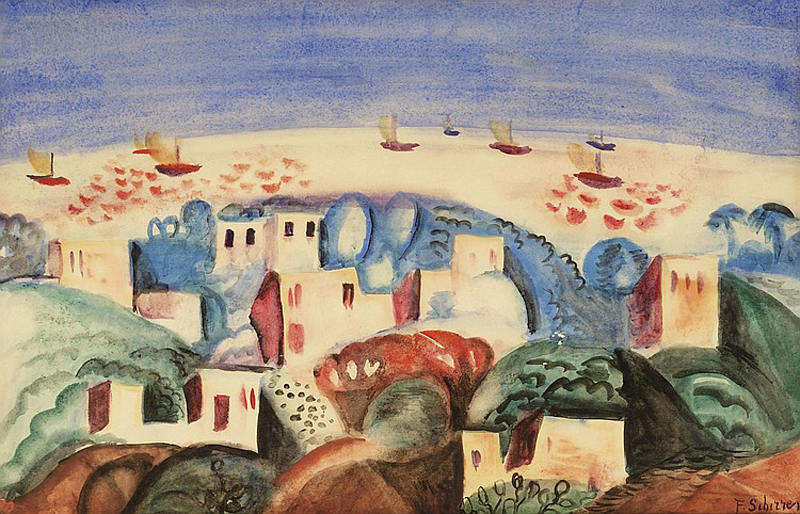
Sailboats on the Coast

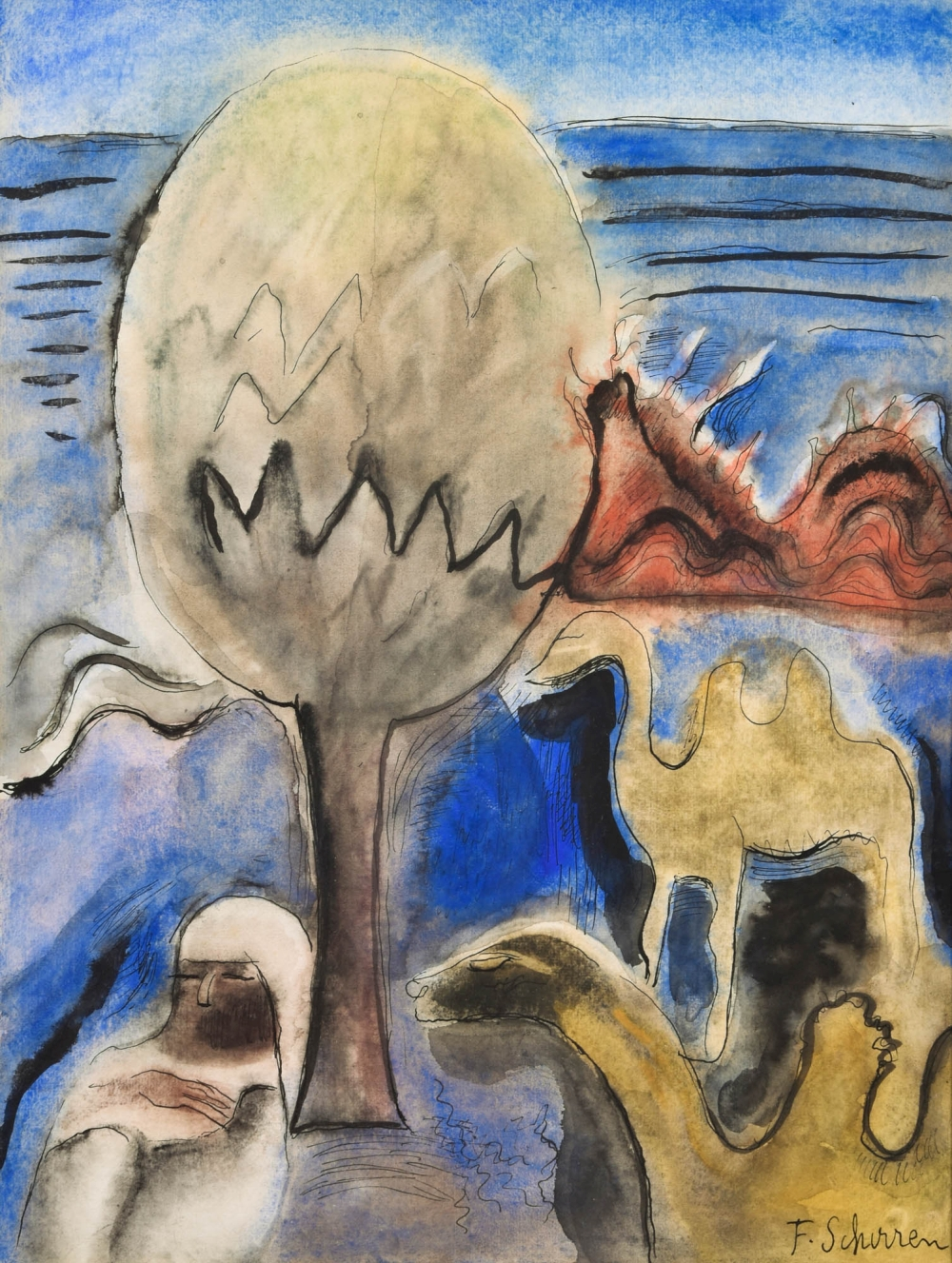
The Dream

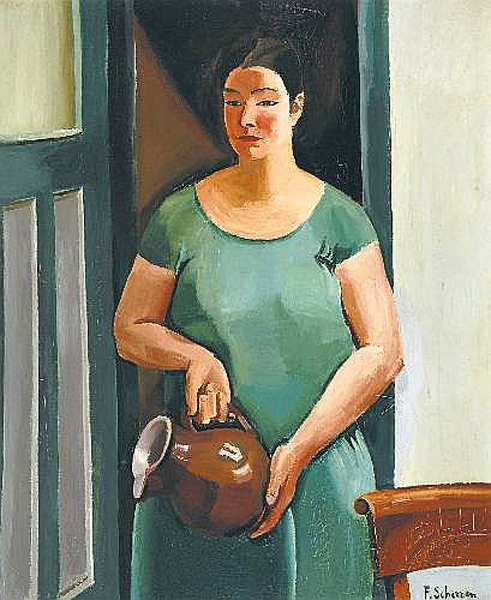
A Woman Standing
