= Anne Pierre de Kat =

Belgian painter

- Born: 1 May 1881; Delft, Netherlands
- Died: 25 July 1968 (aged 87); La Frette-sur-Seine, Belgium
- Occupation: Painter

Anne Pierre de Kat (1 May 1881, Delft – 25 July 1968, La Frette-sur-Seine) was a Belgian painter. His work was part of the painting event in the art competition at the 1936 Summer Olympics.
