= Émile Fabry =

Belgian artist and painter

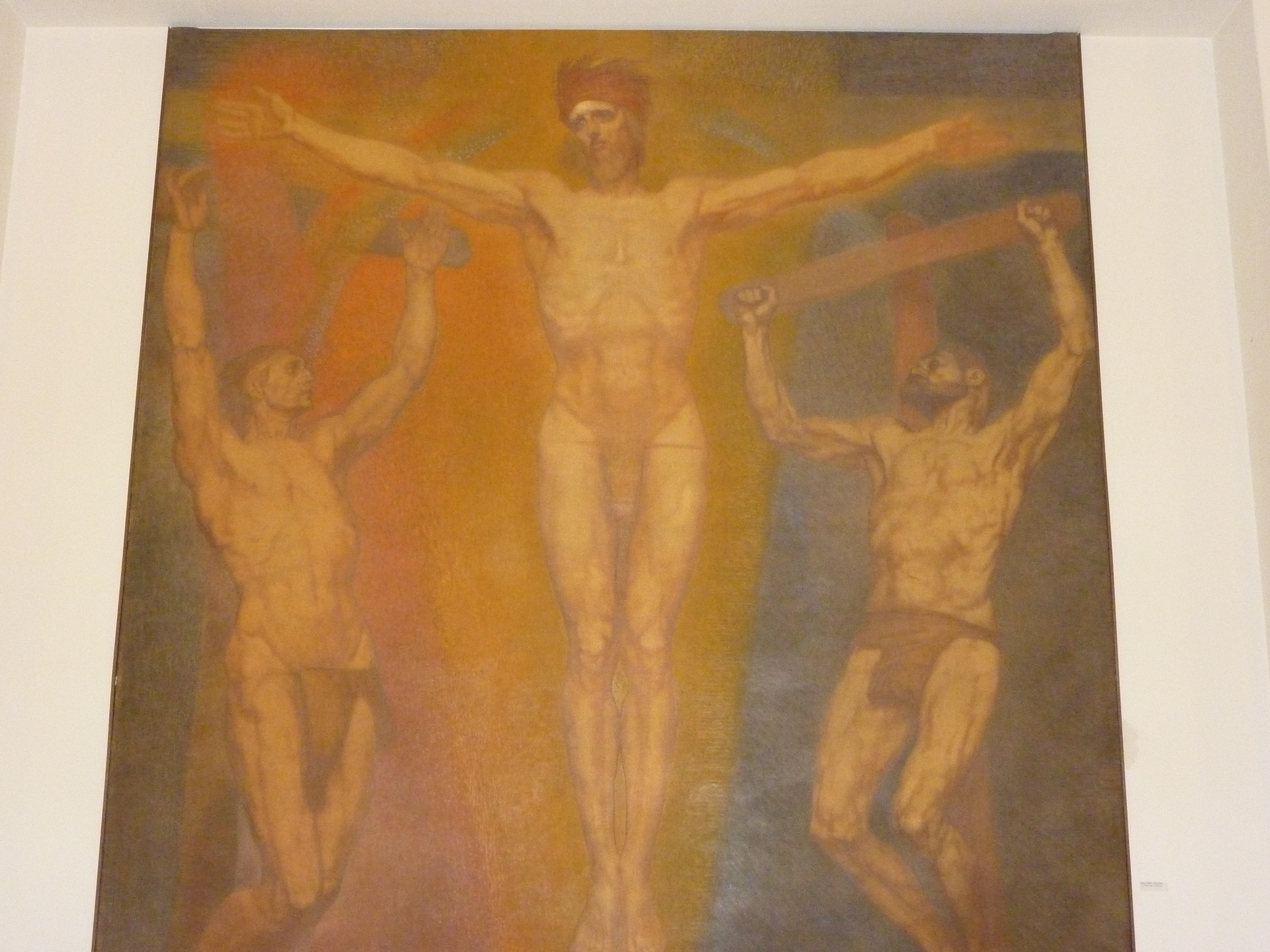
Le Christ entre les larrons

Emile Fabry (1865–1966) was a Belgian artist and painter in the Symbolist style.

Fabry was born in Verviers. He was a student of Jean-François Portaels. Some of his famous works are the decorative mosaics in the Cinquanteniare of Brussels. During his career, he worked with Victor Horta, and he created the decorations in the Hotel Solvay.

During World War I, he sought refuge in St Ives, Cornwall.

Fabry died in 1966 at the age of 101.

== Honours ==
- 1932: Commander in the Order of Leopold.
