= Edgard Tytgat =

Belgian painter

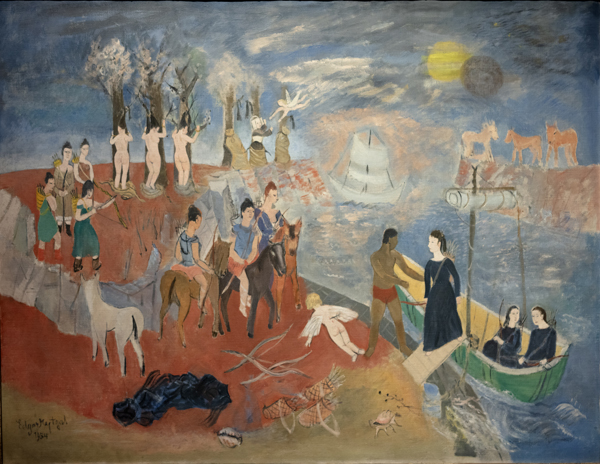
Painting by Edgar Tytgat

Edgard Tytgat (28 April 1879 in Brussels – 11 January 1957 in Woluwe-Saint-Lambert) was a Belgian painter. He is also known for illustrating several of Joseph Weterings's works.
