= Willem Paerels =

Dutch-Belgian painter

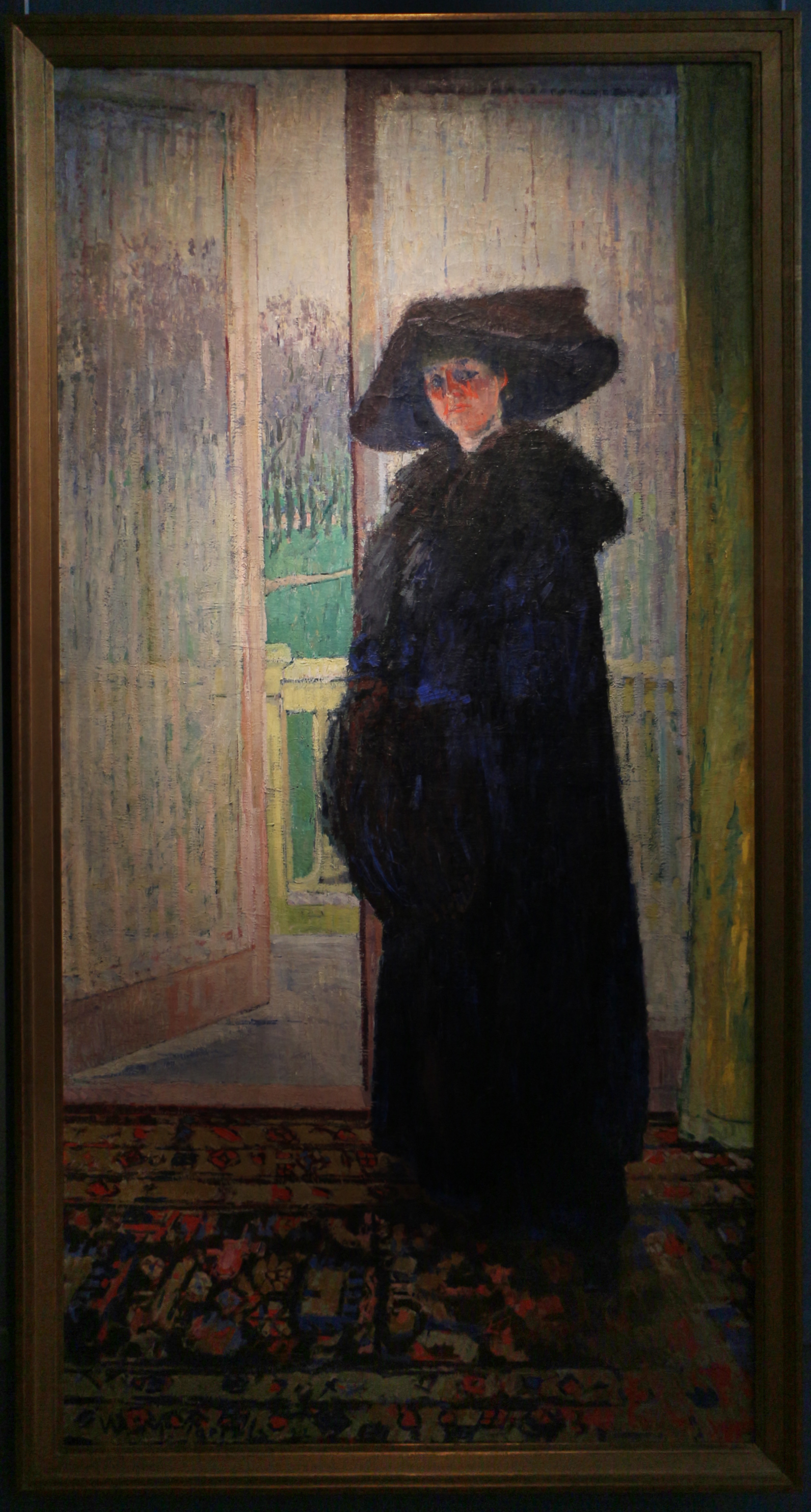
Portret van een vrouw, 1912

Willem Adriaan Paerels (15 July 1878, Delft – 10 February 1962, Eigenbrakel) was a Dutch-Belgian painter. He painted in the style of impressionism, fauvism and expressionism.

== Biography ==
Paerels worked in his father's upholstery shop from an early age, but left for Brussels in 1894 and decided to become a painter. He trained himself and in 1898 he joined the artist group "Le Labeur". Until 1912, he also regularly spend time in Paris, where he was mainly inspired by the French Impressionists. In addition, the influence of Pierre Bonnard and Édouard Vuillard also became visible in his work, and after 1906, after visiting an exhibition in Ghent, of Fauvism. In this style, he quickly made a name in this style and together with painters such as Rik Wouters, Ferdinand Schirren and Edgard Tytgat, he was counted among the Brabant fauvism. He exhibited at the Vie et Lumière and La Libre Esthétique societies and at the Salon d'Automne in Paris, among others.

During World War I, Paerels returned to the Netherlands and worked mainly in Scheveningen. In 1919, he settled back in Belgium. In the 1920s and 1930s, he made several trips, including to Greece, Italy and southern France. His later work is considered expressionist. Paerels became best known for his harbour views, but also painted landscapes, cityscapes, portraits and still lifes.He also made posters and designed sets.

Paerels was married to Hélène Moulaert, daughter of tone poet Raymond Moulaert. In 1930, he had himself naturalised as a Belgian. In 1955, he was awarded the Order of Leopold. He died in 1962 in Braine-l'Alleud, near Brussels, at the age of 83. His work can be seen in the Royal Museums of Fine Arts of Belgium in Brussels, the Museum of Fine Arts Antwerp, the Museum of Fine Arts, Ghent, Museum Boijmans Van Beuningen in Rotterdam, the Gemeentemuseum, The Hague, the Noordbrabants Museum in 's-Hertogenbosch and the Museum Het Prinsenhof, Delft, among others.
