= Wilhelm Koller =

Austrian painter (1829–1884)

Wilhelm Koller

Wilhelm Anton Koller, (French: Guillaume-Antoine Koller, 4, 9, or 14 May 1829 – 1884), was an Austrian-Belgian history and genre painter.

== Biography ==
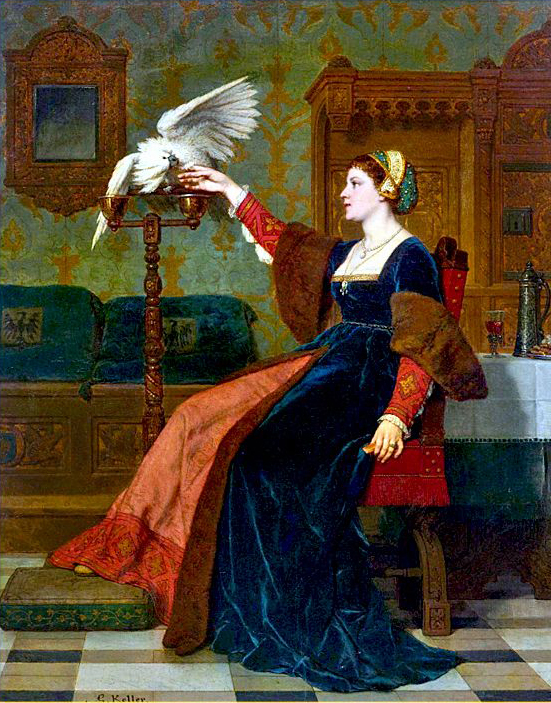
Lady with parrot

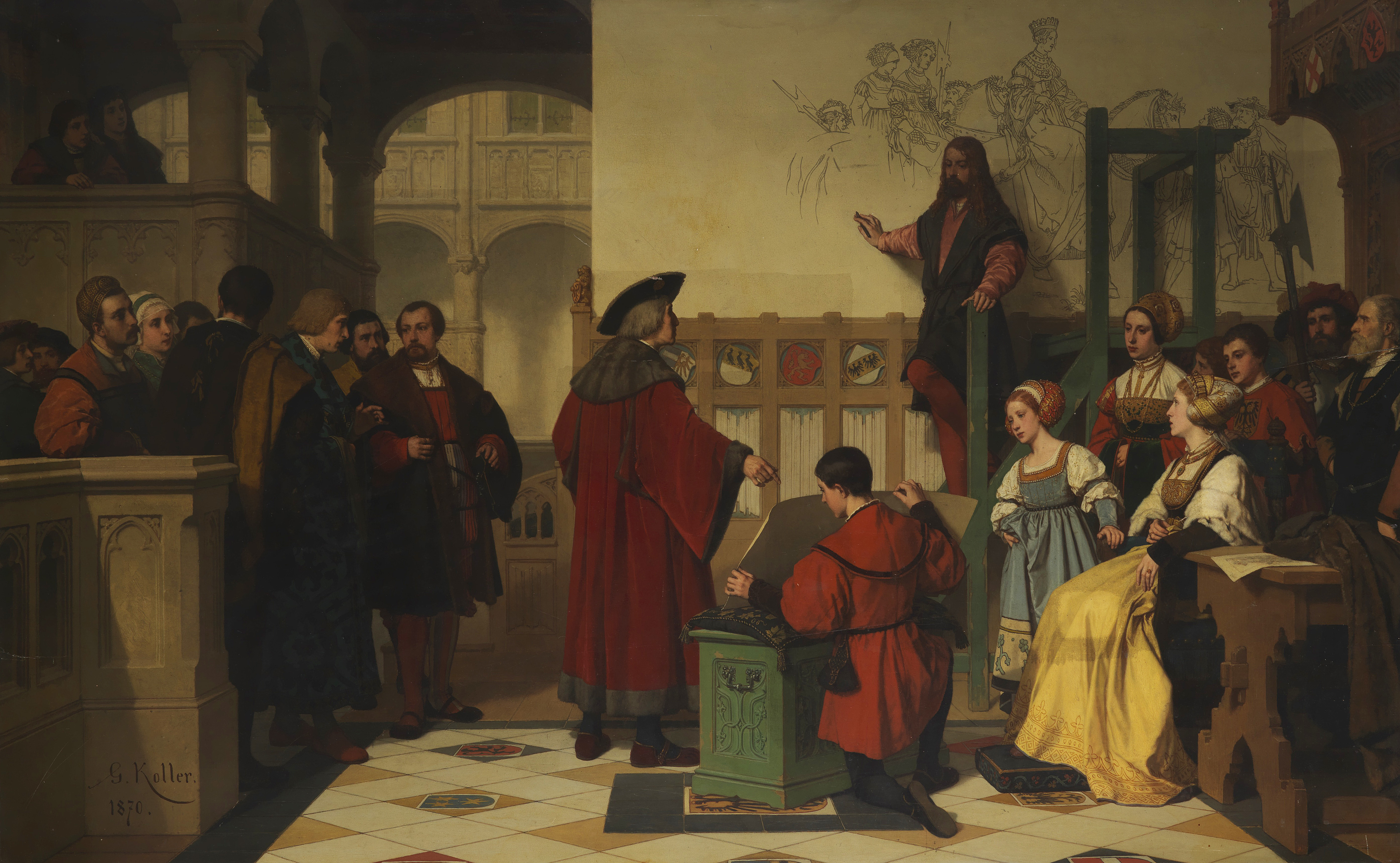
Wilhelm Koller Albrecht Dürer is visited at work by Emperor Maximilian, 1870

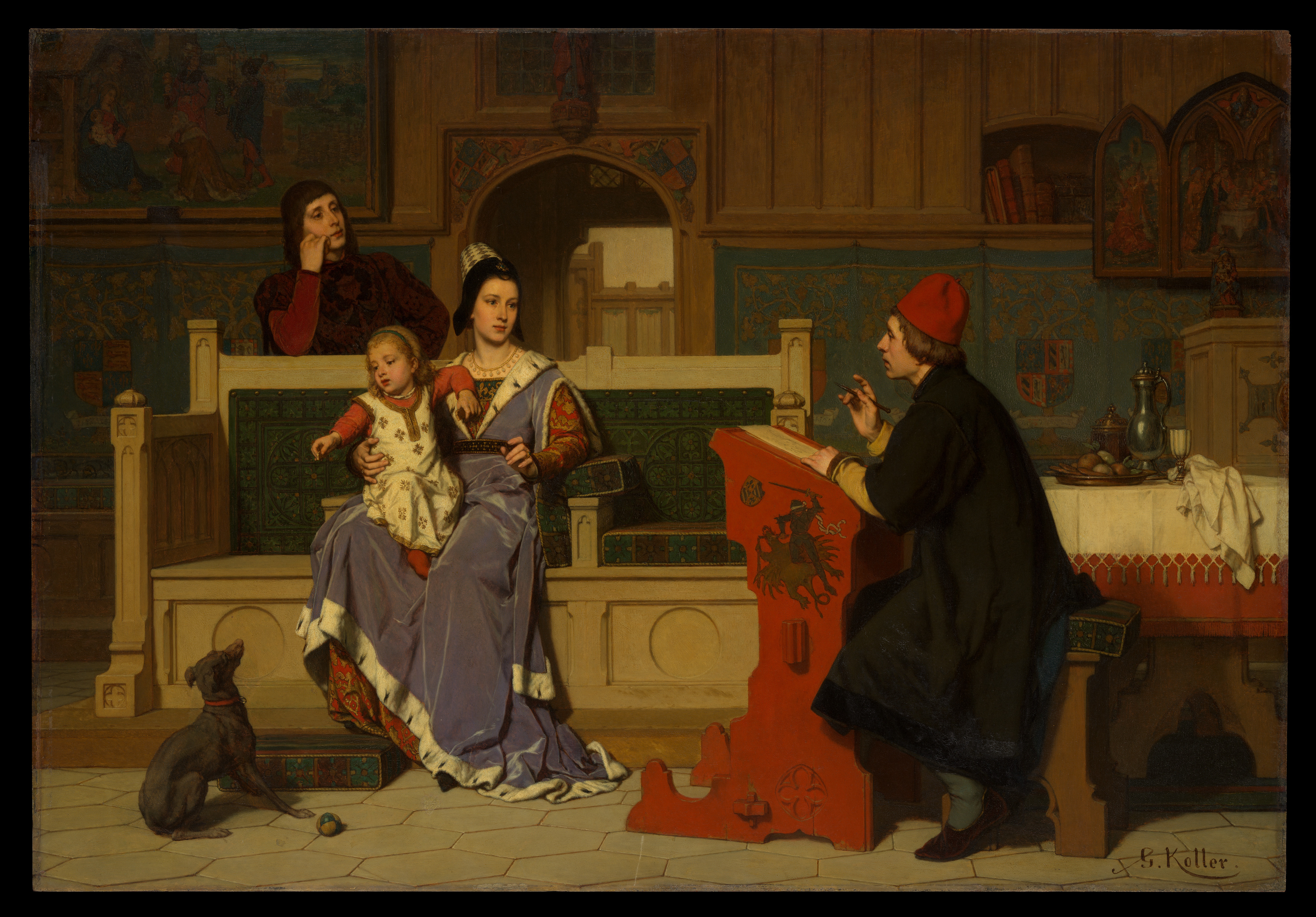
Hugo van der Goe's Portrait of Mary of Burgundy, 1872

Koller was born in 1829 in Olomouc as a son and heir of Wilhelm (Baron von) Koller (d. 21 July 1871), Viennese manufacturer and art collector. He studied painting at the Academy of Fine Arts Vienna under Ferdinand Georg Waldmüller, then continued his studies in Düsseldorf from 1851 to 1855, drawing inspiration from the Düsseldorf school of painting. He lived in Antwerp from 1856 to 1859, and then in Brussels. He married Henriette Roos, who was born in Indonesia, on 23 August 1866 in Heemstede. They had three children born in Belgium. From about 1869 he lived in Paris, but soon after was again in Brussels, where he lived with his family in Schaarbeek and Sint-Joost-ten-Node and became a member of a Freemason lodge.

Koller primarily worked in history painting, favoring subjects from the Middle Ages and Renaissance, which he rendered with coloristic virtuosity in the historicist-Neo-Mannerist costume style. A significant part of his work consists of scenes from the Burgundian Netherlands and from the life of the painter Albrecht Dürer, whose work was collected by his father. At one point he collaborated with David de Noter (1818–1892) to create several paintings. Koller was an internationally acclaimed artist of his time, being associated with the Düsseldorf and Belgian schools.

In 1872 he was knighted into the Order of Leopold at the Brussels Salon. He also received numerous awards from outside Belgium, including the knighthood of the Order of Franz Joseph in 1874. At the end of his life, he acquired Belgian citizenship.

Koller died under unclear circumstances on a country road near Nancy.
