= Joseph Coosemans =

Belgian painter (1828–1904)

Joseph Théodore Coosemans
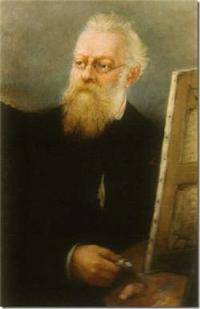
- Joseph Coosemans; portrait by Jean-Emmanuel Van den Bussche
- Born: March 19, 1828; Brussels
- Died: September 24, 1904 (aged 76); Schaerbeek
- Occupation: landscape painter

Joseph Théodore Coosemans (19 March 1828, in Brussels – 24 September 1904, in Schaerbeek) was a Belgian landscape painter.

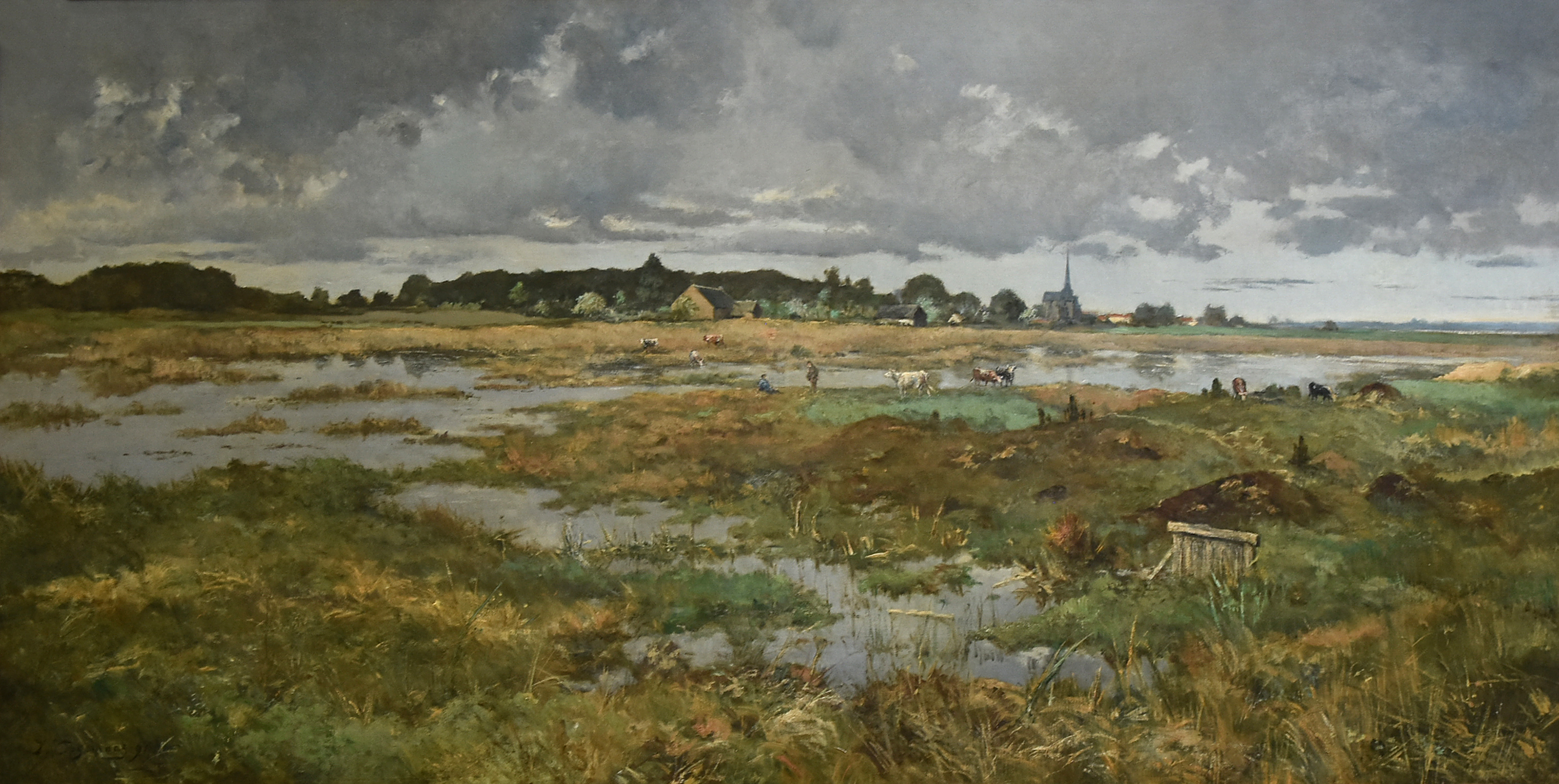
A Swamp near Genk

== Life and work ==
His father, Adriaan, was a merchant, who died when Joseph was only a year old. His mother, Anna, died the following year and he was placed in the care of an aunt. After studies at a Jesuit college in Brussels, he took a job as a notary in Tervuren. He later worked as a clerk for a horse farm, and held several clerical positions for the city governments in Tervuren and Duisburg.

These areas were favorite spots for artists, which led him to develop an interest in painting. Under the influence of Théodore Fourmois, he decided to specialize in landscapes. He held his first exhibition in 1863. He remained entirely self-taught.

In 1868, he was one of the co-founders of the Société Libre des Beaux-Arts; originally a small workshop, later a sort of free academy. After 1872, he devoted himself exclusively to painting. During this time, he became one of the first members of an artists' group known as the School van Tervuren.

He made visits to Normandy with Alfred Verwée and Louis Dubois, and spent a short time at Barbizon. While there, he created some works in the style of the Barbizon School. His own style gradually evolved from that of Fourmois to a simpler approach, reminiscent of Hippolyte Boulenger, his patron at Tervuren.

In 1887, he was named a Professor of landscape painting at the Royal Academy of Fine Arts in Antwerp. In 1893, he suffered a cerebral haemorrhage, which paralyzed his right hand. Although he was able to learn how to paint with his left hand, his works took on a sketchy appearance. He retained his position at the Academy until his death in 1904, and was succeeded by Franz Courtens.

Shortly after his death, a street in Schaerbeek was named after him. In 2004, on the centenary of his death, the municipality paid him a tribute. The exhibition included forty-nine of his works, plus two by his son, Frits, as well as a bust of him by Léon Mignon, and a portrait by Jean-Emmanuel Van den Bussche.

== Sources ==
- Joseph Coosemans (1825–1904). Schilder van de school van Tervuren, by Herman De Vilder & Maurits Wynants, Vrienden van de School van Tervuren, 1993
- In het spoor van de meester. Joseph Coosemans en leerlingen in Genk, by Kristof Reulens, Stad Genk: Emile Van Dorenmuseum, 2012 ISBN 978-90-8146-774-2
