= Hippolyte Boulenger =

Belgian painter (1837–1874)

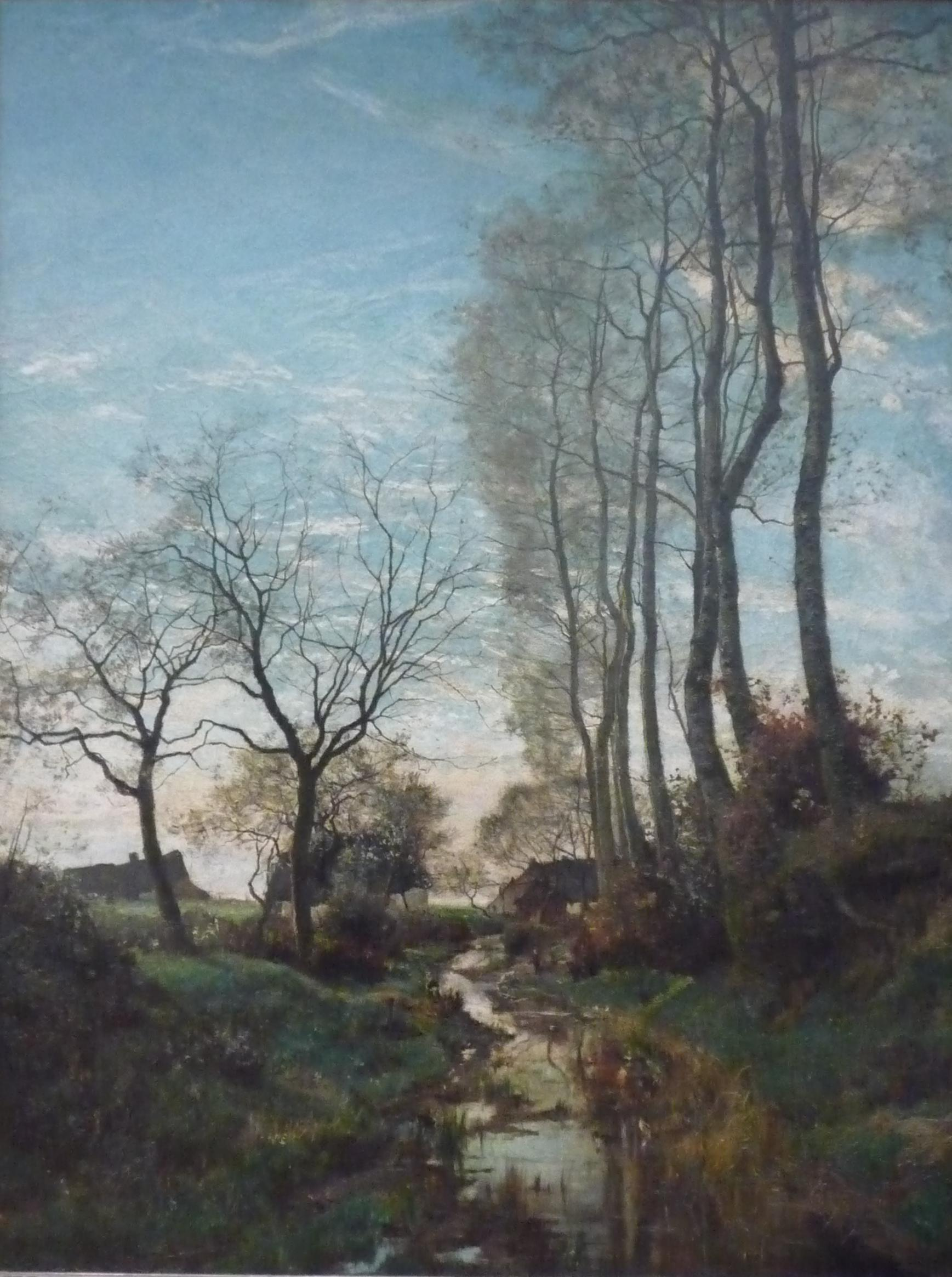
- Josaphat Valley at Schaarbeek
- Born: 3 December 1837; Tournai
- Died: 4 July 1874 (aged 36); Brussels
- Known for: Painting

Hippolyte Emmanuel Boulenger (3 December 1837 – 4 July 1874) was a Belgian landscape painter influenced by the French Barbizon school, considered to be "the Belgian Corot".

== Biography ==
Hippolyte Boulenger was born to French parents in Tournai in 1837. He spent his youth in Tournai and lived in Paris between 1850 and 1853, where he studied drawing. In 1853, after he became an orphan, he went to Brussels to work at a design atelier. In the evening, he studied at the Académie Royale des Beaux-Arts with Joseph Quinaux, a landscape painter.

He met portrait painter Camille van Camp in 1863, who became a mentor and mecenas. He showed his first painting in the Brussels Salon the same year. Boulenger went to Tervuren in 1864, and called round him a group of likeminded painters gathered there, the School van Tervuren, a Belgian version of the Barbizon school, of which he became the leading artist. At the time, his leading model was Jean-François Millet, although his later work was closer to that of Corot. By 1866, he was famous in Belgian art circles.

He married in 1868 and moved to Zaventem, but returned to Tervuren in 1870. These years were his best and most fruitful period, with e.g. the painting De oude Haagbeukdreef. Tervuren, which won him the Gold Medal of the 1872 Brussels Salon. In this period, he travelled in Belgium and abroad, painting along the River Meuse. It was his suggestion that led to the creation of the Société Libre des Beaux-Arts, an art circle of young Belgian artists, including Alfred Verwee, Félicien Rops, and Constantin Meunier, with honorary members from abroad like Corot and Millet, but also Honoré Daumier, Gustave Courbet and Willem Maris.

By 1869, he began to develop epilepsy. Coupled with alcohol abuse, this led to his early death in 1874 at a hotel in Brussels.

== Works ==
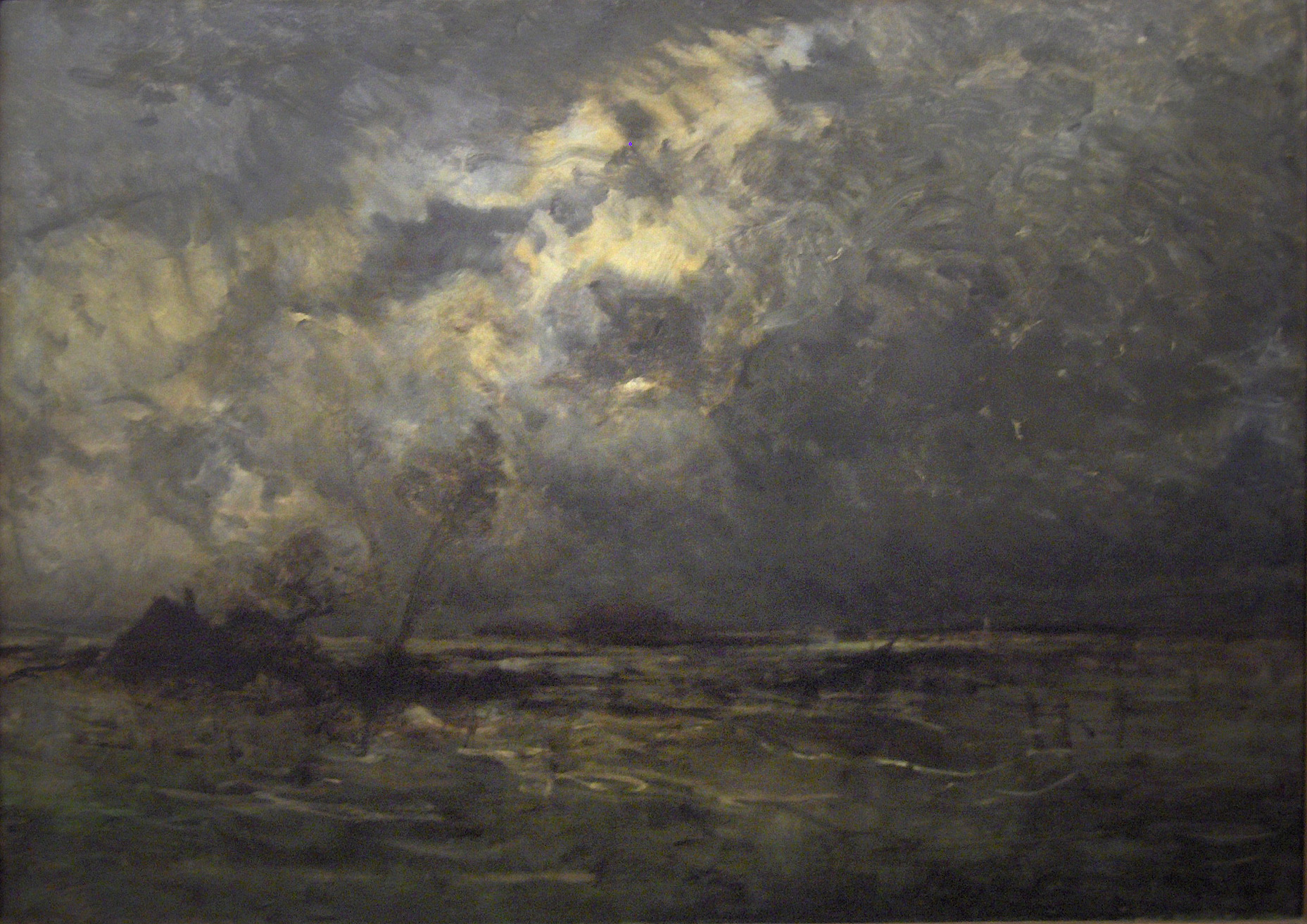
The Inundation

- Josaphat Valley at Schaarbeek, 1868, Royal Museum of Fine Arts, Antwerp
- After the evening storm, 1869, Museum of Fine Arts, Ghent
- The Inundation, 1871, Royal Museums of Fine Arts of Belgium, Brussels (this museum has a substantial collection of works by Boulenger, including the 1871 Mass of Saint-Hubert)

== Bibliography ==
- P. & V. Berko, "Dictionary of Belgian painters born between 1750 & 1875", Knokke 1981, pp. 63–64.
