= Alphonse Asselbergs =

Belgian painter (1839–1916)

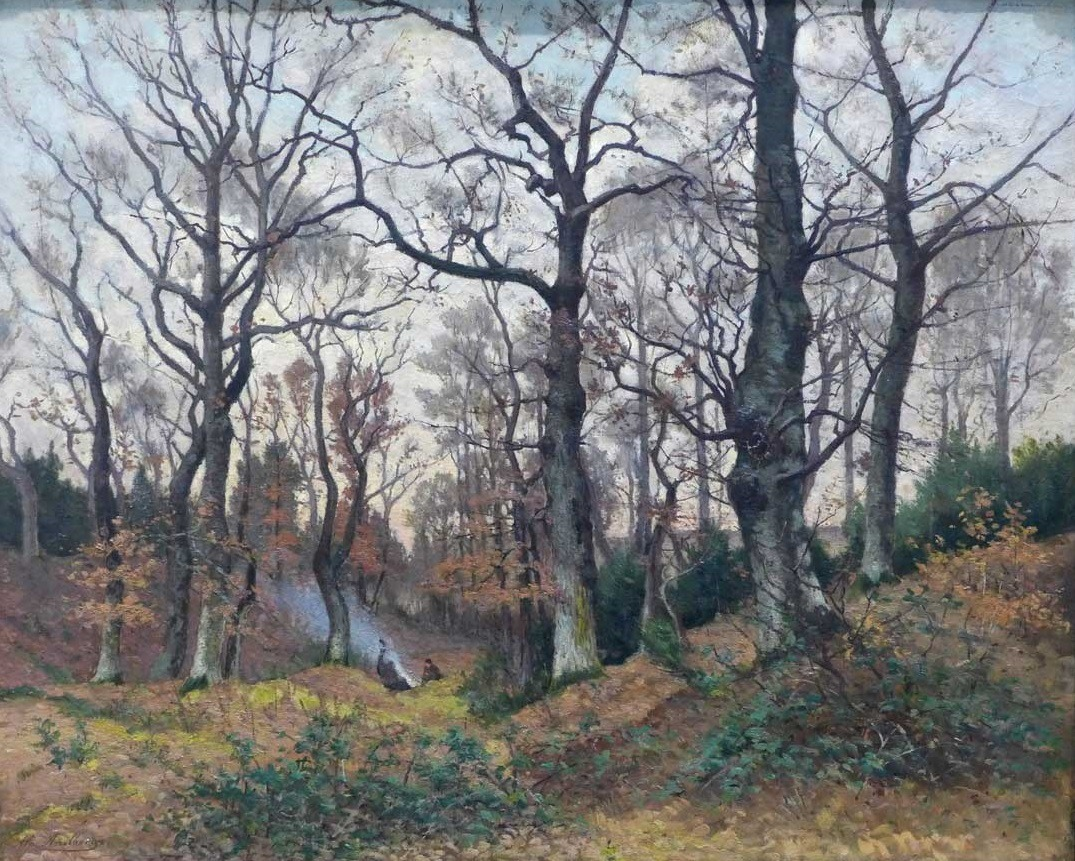
Around a Fire in the Forest

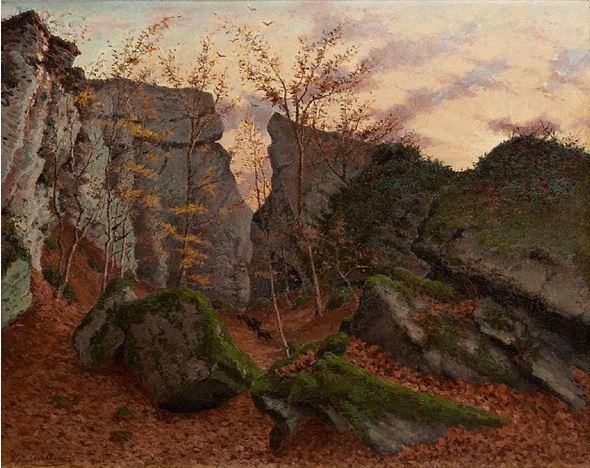
Wild Boars in the Ravine

Alphonse Asselbergs (19 June 1839 – 10 April 1916) was a Belgian painter, primarily of landscapes and forest scenes.

== Life and work ==
He was born in Brussels, Belgium to Henri Asselbergs, a successful merchant in the paper trade. He and his brother, Emile, attended the local atheneum. At the age of twenty, he went to work for his father's company. He became interested in art after a chance meeting with the landscape painter, Edouard Huberti, and created his first paintings, of the Kempen, in 1861. For several years after, he vacillated between his comfortable, upper-class life as a businessman, and the risks involved in becoming an artist.

Much of his training in art came from Huberti, and he would travel with him in the area around Namur. It was there he befriended Théodore T'Scharner (1826–1906), a student of Ferdinand Marinus, with whom he would go on painting expeditions in the Ardennes. In the summer of 1866, he took an extended trip with Huberti, to the artists' colony at Anseremme, where he was first exposed to the concept of painting en plein aire.

He finally made his choice. The family business was closed in 1866 and, the following year, he joined the painters at the artists' colony in Tervuren, where he stayed regularly until 1871. The Tervuren Schhol later became known as the Belgian equivalent of the Barbizon School. By 1868, he was receiving good reviews at the salon in Ghent. That same year, he became one of the co-founders of the Société Libre des Beaux-Arts. By 1869, he was exhibiting in Brussels.

From 1873 to 1874, he visited Algeria with the watercolorist, Arthur Bouvier (1837–1921). This resulted in a number of Orientalist canvases. They were, however, not a commercial success. Despite having been shown at numerous exhibitions, they were all still in his studio at the time of his death. After returning from Algeria, he lived near the artists' colony in Genk, and made occasional excursions to the forests of Fontainebleau.

In 1877, he moved to Uccle. He had a studio with a round tower, on a street that is now named after him. He also made short trips abroad; to France and Italy. During the 1880s, he held exhibitions at the Salon in Paris. In 1881, he was named an officer in the Order of Leopold; receiving a second commission in 1896.

Died in 1916 in Uccle.

== Sources ==
- Gustave Vanzype, Alphonse Asselbergs, G. Van Oost, Bruxelles-Paris, 1918.
- P. & V. Berko, Dictionary of Belgian Painters born between 1750 and 1875, Editions Laconti, 1981 ISBN 978-2-87008-013-9
- Herman De Vilder, "De School van Tervuren : in de bedding van de tijd"; De Vrienden van de School van Tervuren, 2008 ISBN 978-90-805835-04
- Danny Lannoy, Frieda Devinck, Thérèse Thomas, Impressionisten in Knocke & Heyst (1870-1914); Stichting Kunstboek, Oostkamp, 2007 ISBN 978-90-5856-247-0
- Kristof Reulens (Ed.), Genk door schildersogen. Landschapsschilders in de Limburgse Kempen, Davidsfonds Leuven, 2010 ISBN 978 90 5826 749 8
