= Camille van Camp =

Belgian painter and engraver

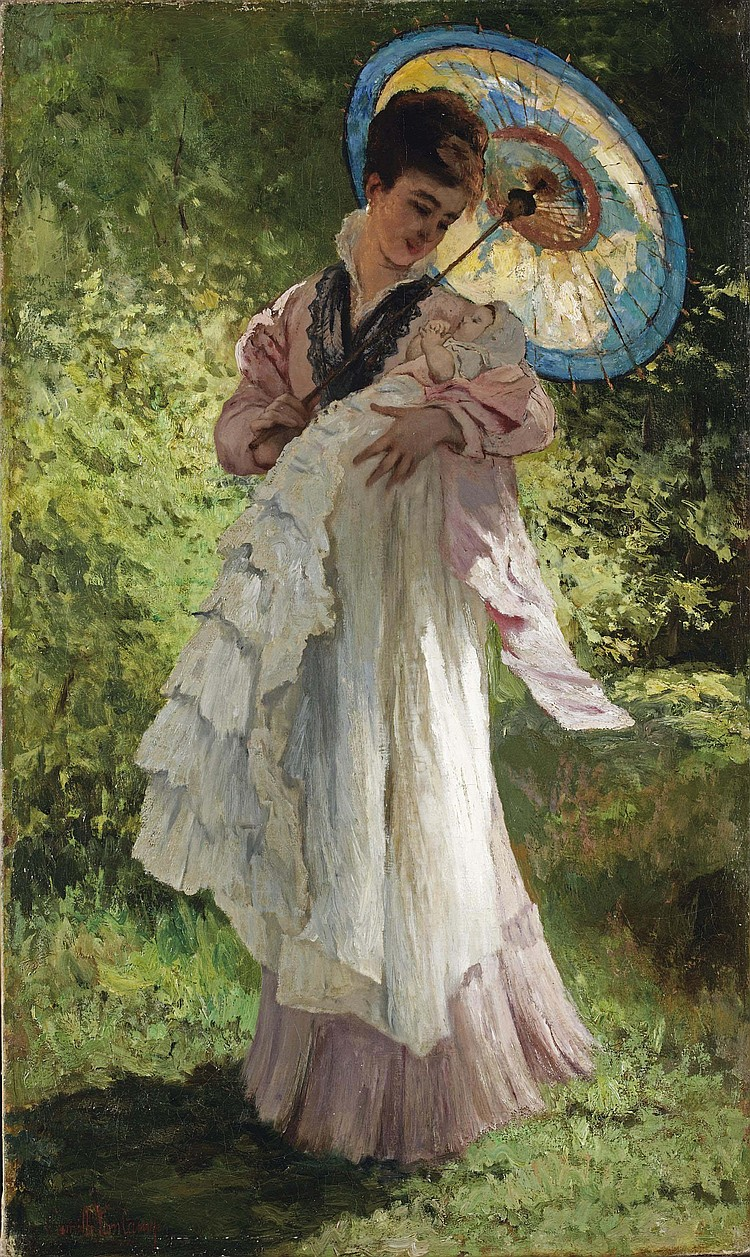
Camille Van Camp : A Mother's Love

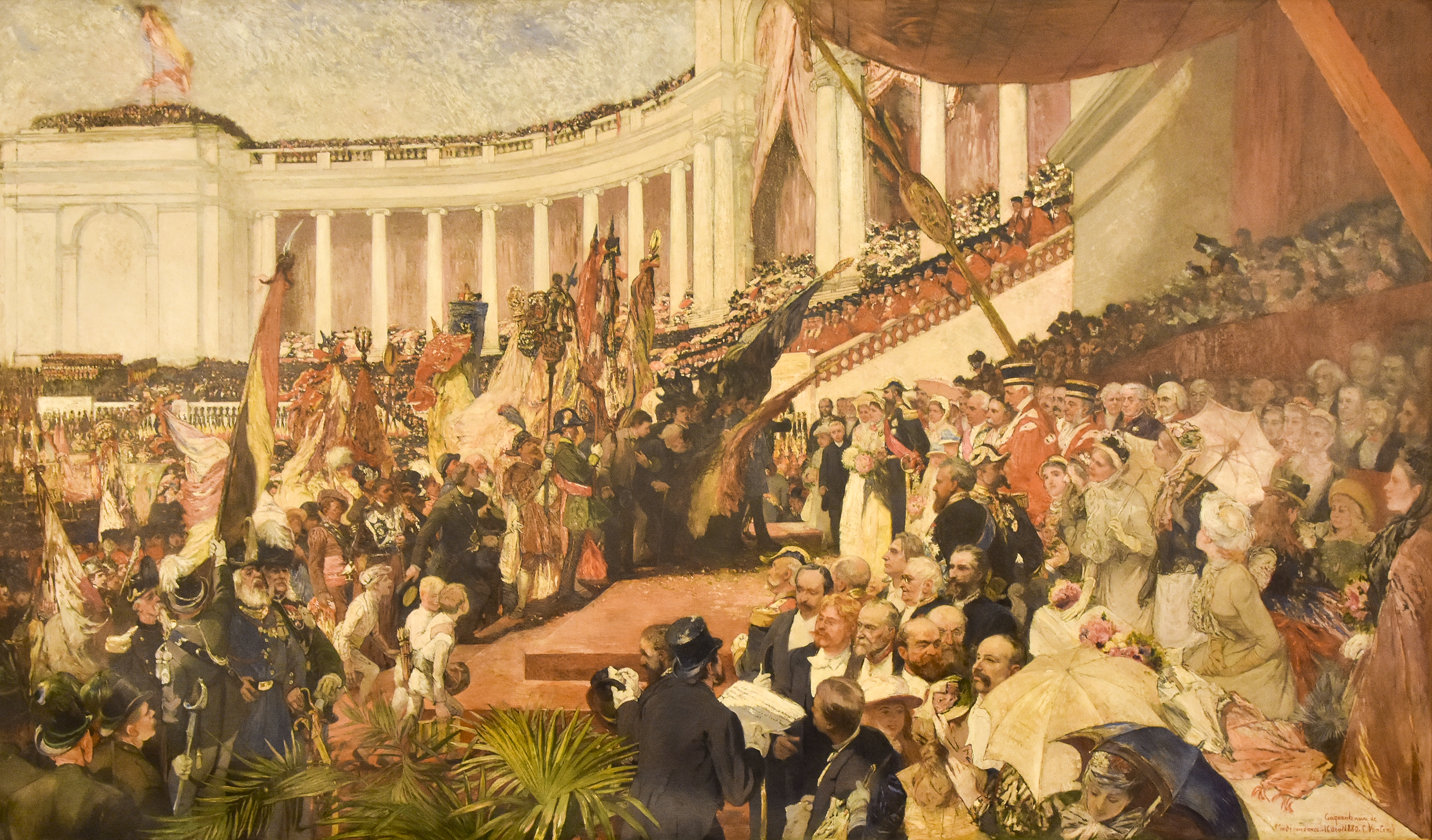
Camille Van Camp : The patriotic celebration of the fiftieth anniversary of the Belgian independence, 16 August 1880, oil on canvas, 1890, Belgian Parlement.

Camille van Camp (3 June 1834, Tongeren – 16 November 1891, Montreux) was a Belgian portrait and landscape painter, watercolorist, and engraver.

== Life and work ==
His father was a lawyer; originally from Antwerp. From 1848 to 1853, he studied at the Académie royale des Beaux-Arts de Bruxelles with François-Joseph Navez, Louis Gallait and Louis Huard.

He paid a visit to Florence in 1857, where he copied the Old Masters at the Uffizi. Two years later, he did the same thing at the Louvre in Paris.

In 1863, he and his friend, Hippolyte Boulenger, went to Tervuren, the site of a flourishing artists' colony. There, he participated in creating a style of landscape painting that came to be known as the School van Tervuren.

Five years later, he was one of the co-founders of the Société Libre des Beaux-Arts. He also published criticism in L’Art libre, a French fine arts journal, and was a correspondent for the Illustrated London News.

He was one of the illustrators for the first edition of The Legend of Thyl Ulenspiegel, by Charles De Coster. Unfortunately, it was poorly printed and full of typographical errors. Corrections were made for a second edition in 1869, but the work gained little attention until the 1920s, when new illustrations were created.

He died while taking the cure at a spa in Switzerland.

== Sources ==
- "Camp, Camille J. B. van", In: Ulrich Thieme (Ed.): Allgemeines Lexikon der Bildenden Künstler von der Antike bis zur Gegenwart, Vol.5: Brewer–Carlingen. E. A. Seemann, Leipzig 1911, pg.445 (Online)
- "Van Camp, Camille" in: Dictionnaire des peintres belges (Online)
- Simone Speth-Holterhoff, Camille Van Camp, 1834-1891, preface by Paul Fierens, Brussels, La Renaissance du Livre, 1952
