= Marie Collart =

Belgian artist (1842–1911)

Marie Collart-Henrotin
- Born: Marie Collart; 5 December 1842; Brussels, Belgium
- Died: 8 October 1911 (aged 68); Sardinia, Italy
- Known for: Painting
- Spouse: Edmond Henrotin (m. 1871)

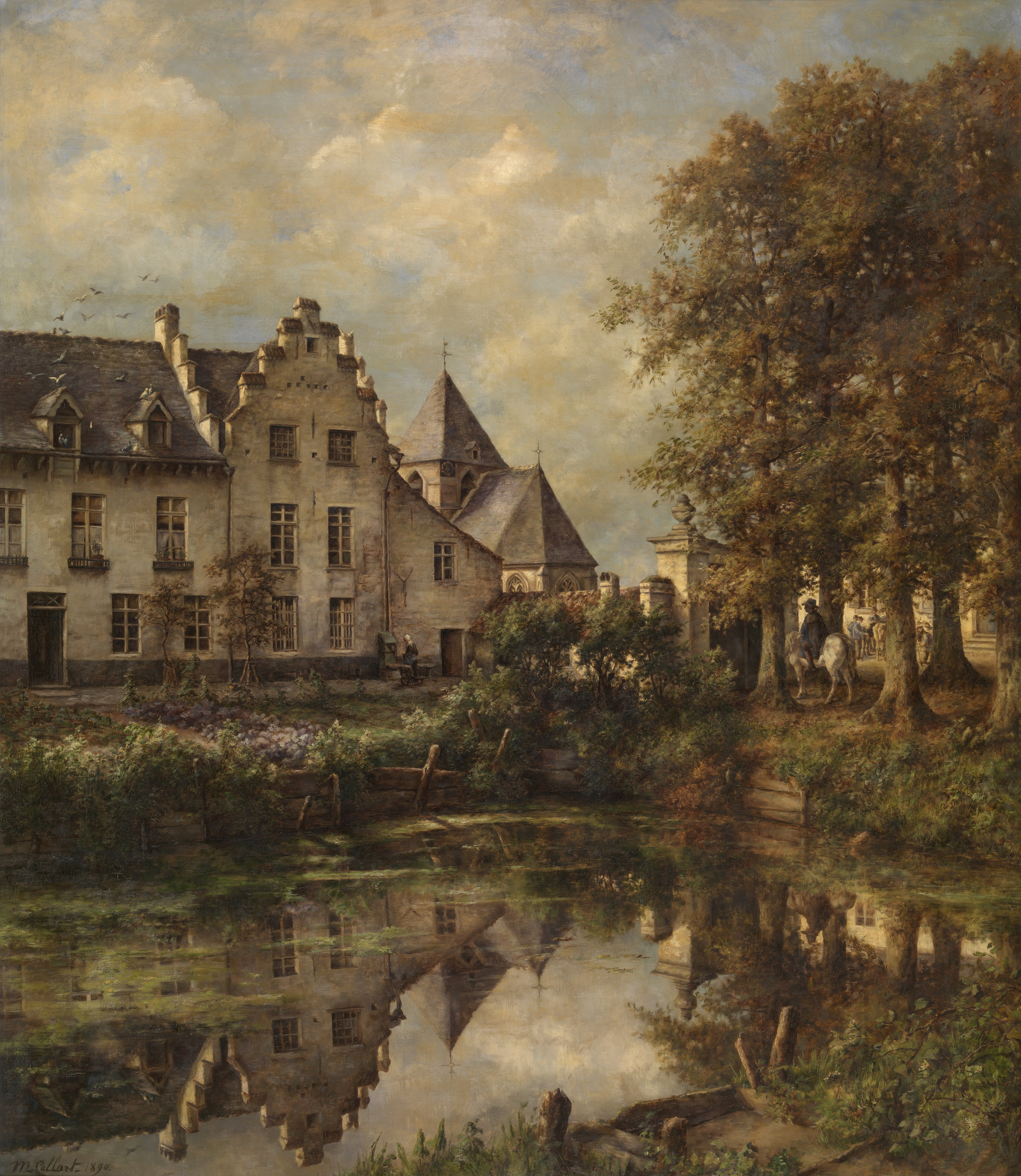
Hofstede in Brabant by Marie Collart

Marie Collart-Henrotin (5 December 1842 – 8 October 1911) was a Belgian artist who mainly painted landscapes and animals.

== Early life and education ==
Marie Collart was born in Brussels, Belgium on 5 December 1842 into a creative and forward looking bourgeois family. Growing up, she spent time with the writers Victor Hugo and Charles Baudelaire who were family friends. Her mother Isabelle Collart-Motte was very interested in culture. Collart was primarily self-taught as an artist, but benefited from the advice of Alfred Verwee, Léonce Chabry and the art dealer and critic Arthur Stevens. Collart enjoyed exploring the countryside, particularly around Tervueren where her family spent time in the summer. It was here that she discovered painting en plein-air, and met the painters of the École de Tervueren.

== Career ==
Collart became a founding member of the Société Libre des Beaux-Arts in 1868. In 1870, she won a gold medal at the Salon des artistes français. She became the first women to be named a Chevalier in the Belgian Order of Leopold in 1880.

She won gold medals at exhibitions in Ghent (1881), in Paris and in Brussels (1897).

Collart exhibited her work at the Palace of Fine Arts and The Woman's Building at the 1893 World's Columbian Exposition in Chicago, Illinois.

== Personal life ==
In 1871, Collart married Edmond Maximilien Clément Henrotin, an artillery captain and they had several children. This did not prevent Collart's continuing artistic career. Her husband died in 1894.

Collart died at Nebida in Sardinia at the age of 68.

== Gallery ==
Her work is included in the collections of the Royal Museum of Fine Arts Antwerp and Royal Museums of Fine Arts of Belgium.

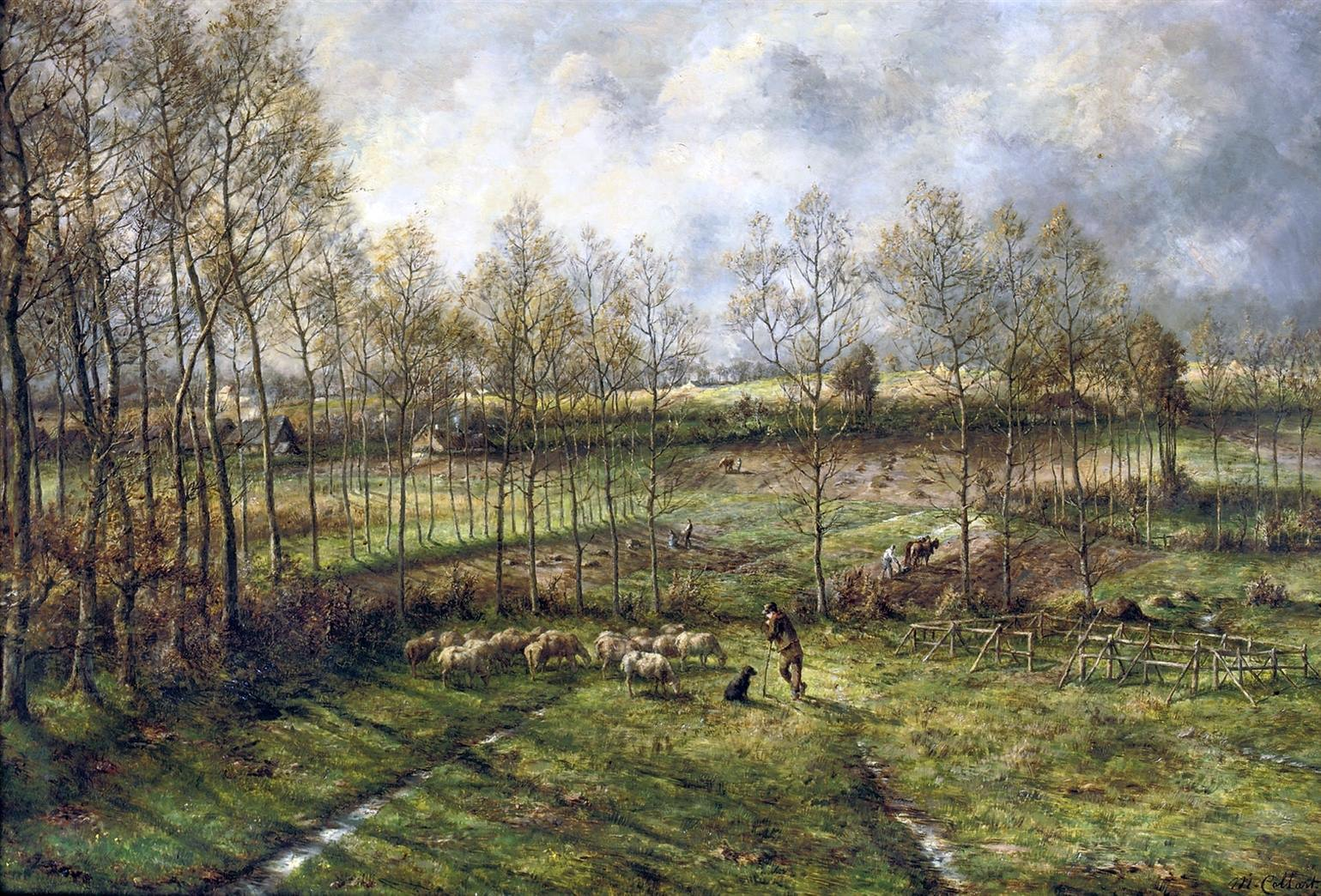
La Campagne en Mars

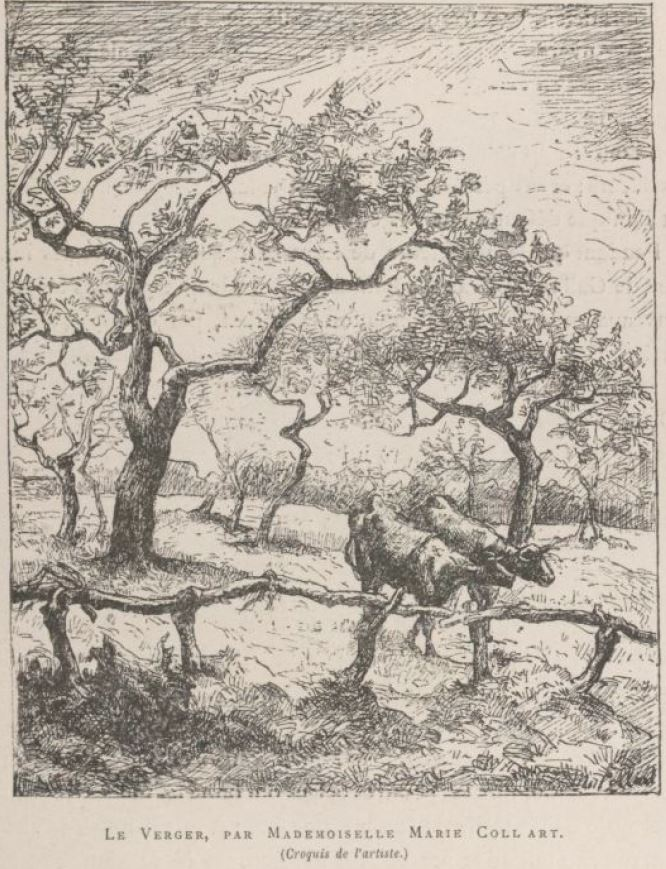
Le verger

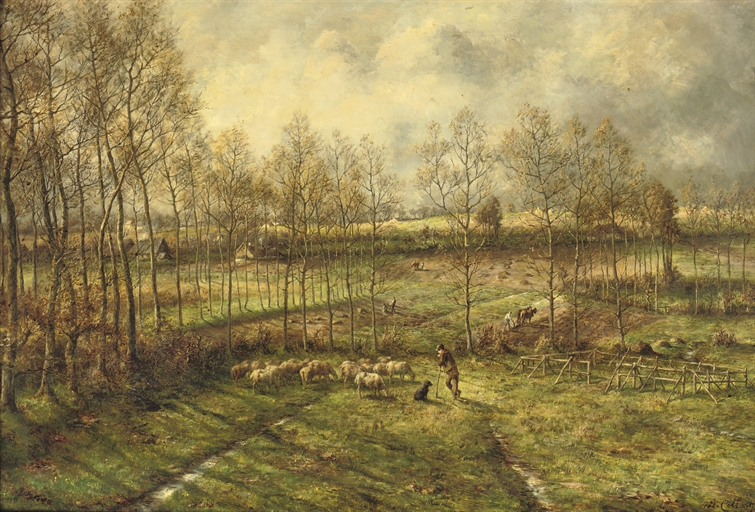
La campagne en mars

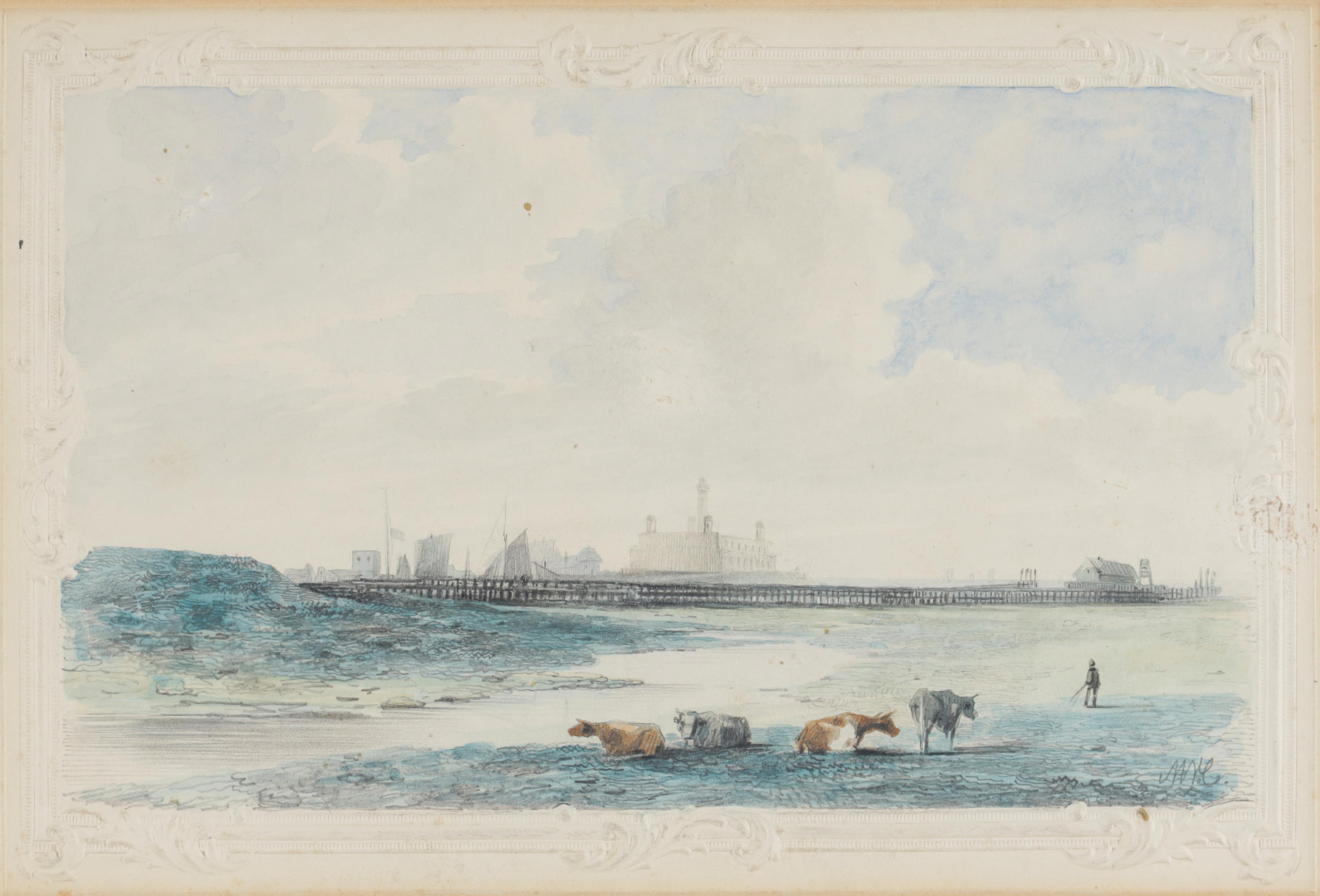
Ostende

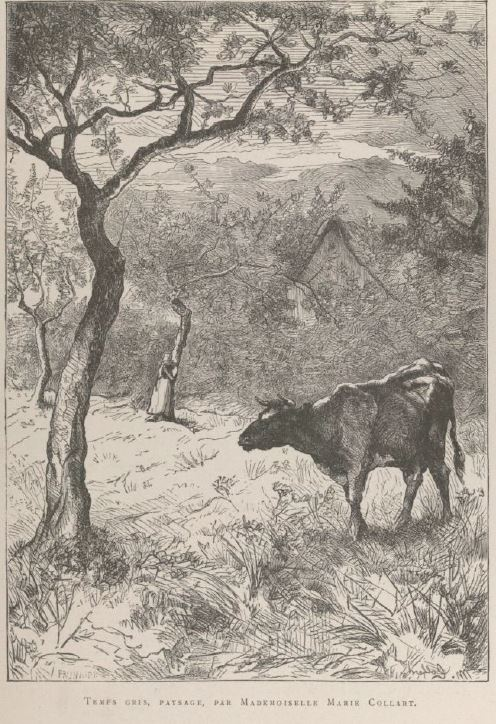
Temps gris
