= Edouard Agneessens =

Belgian painter

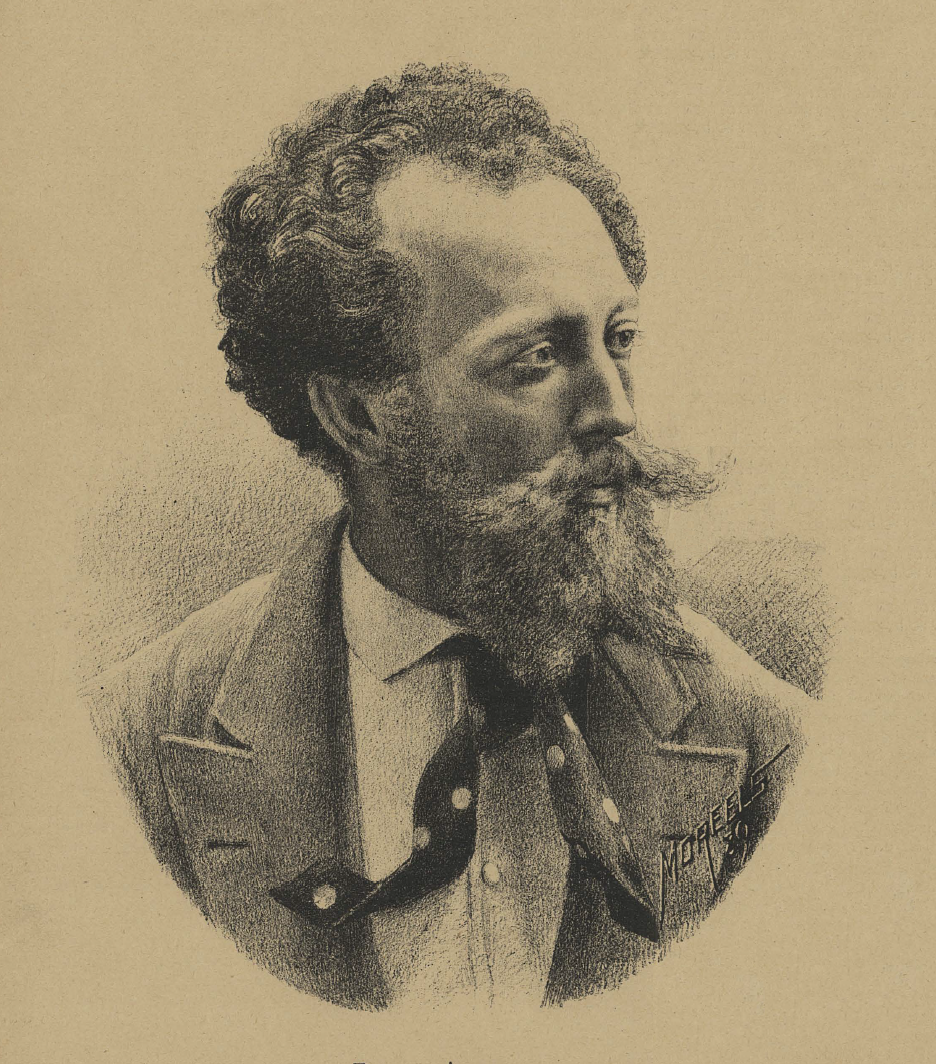
- Born: Edouard Agneessens; 24 July 1842; Brussels, Belgium
- Died: 20 July 1885 (aged 42); Uccle, Belgium
- Education: Académie Royale des Beaux-Arts
- Occupation: painter

Edouard Agneessens (24 August 1842 – 20 August 1885) was a Belgian painter born in Brussels. He studied under Jean-François Portaels from 1859 at the Académie Royale des Beaux-Arts in Brussels, and in 1869 won the Prix de Rome. In 1868, he was one of the founding members of the Société Libre des Beaux-Arts in Brussels.

Agneessens later built up quite a career in Saint-Petersburg, but returned to Brussels in the 1880s. In the latter part of his life he suffered from a mental disorder. His works include Standing Male Nude (1870), Ladies by a Piano, and Bloemenstilleven. He died in 1885 in Uccle.

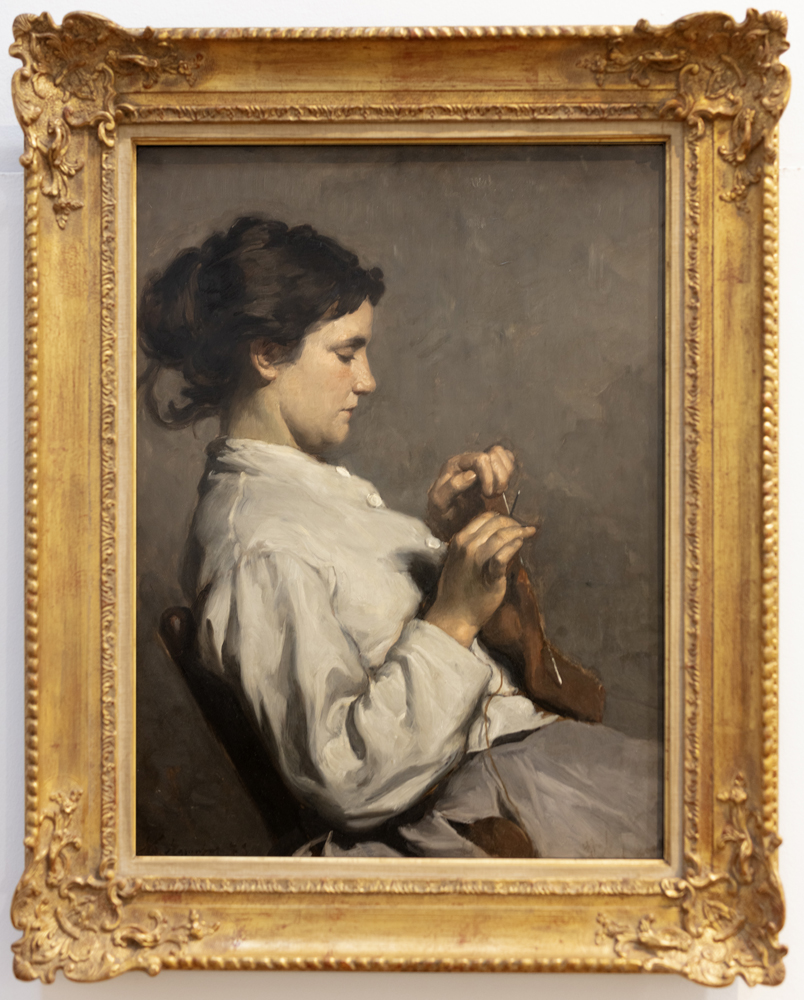

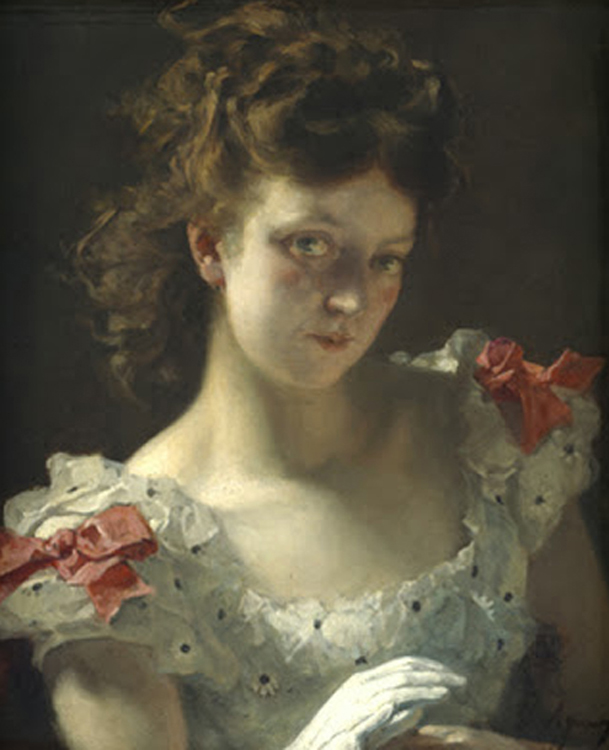

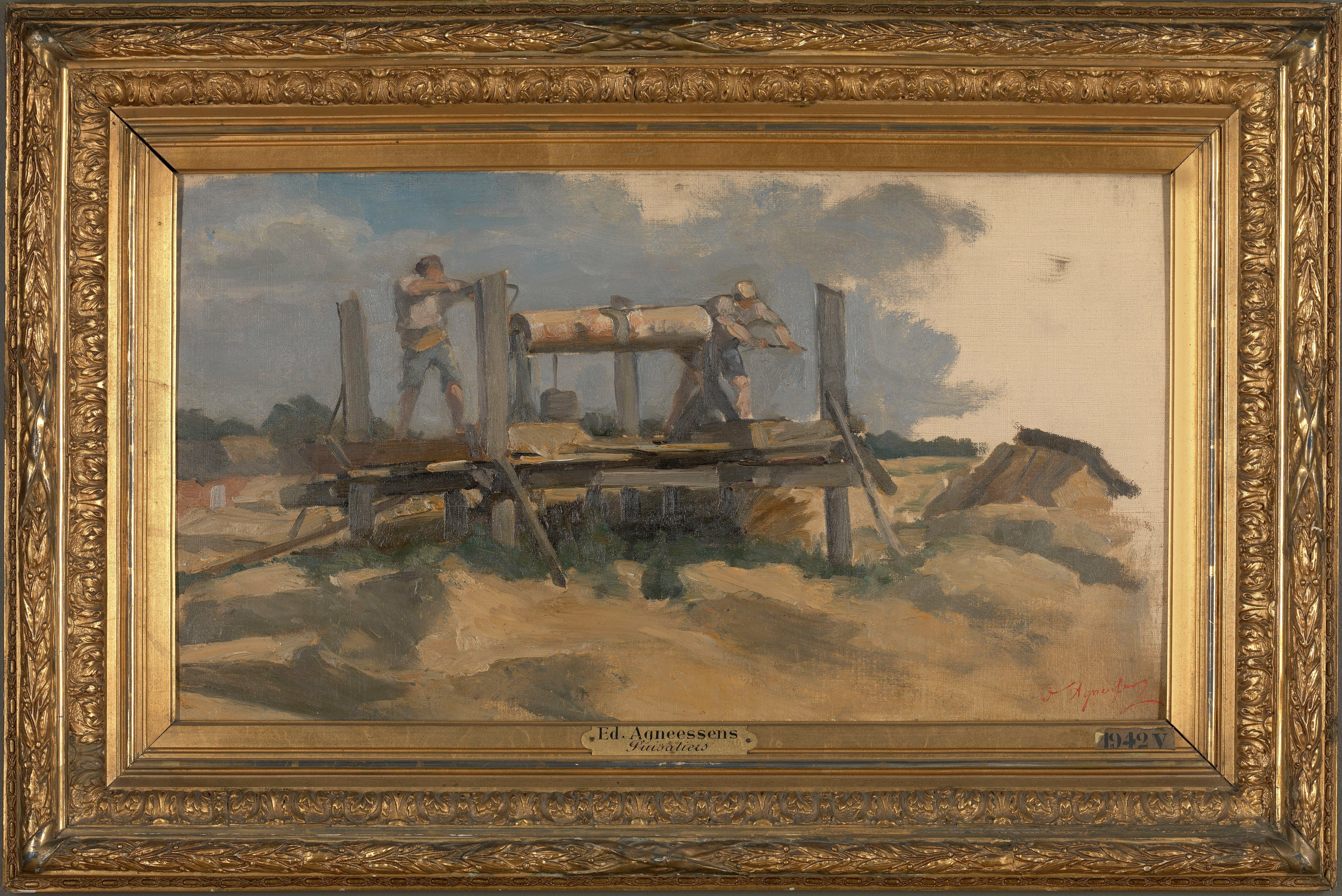

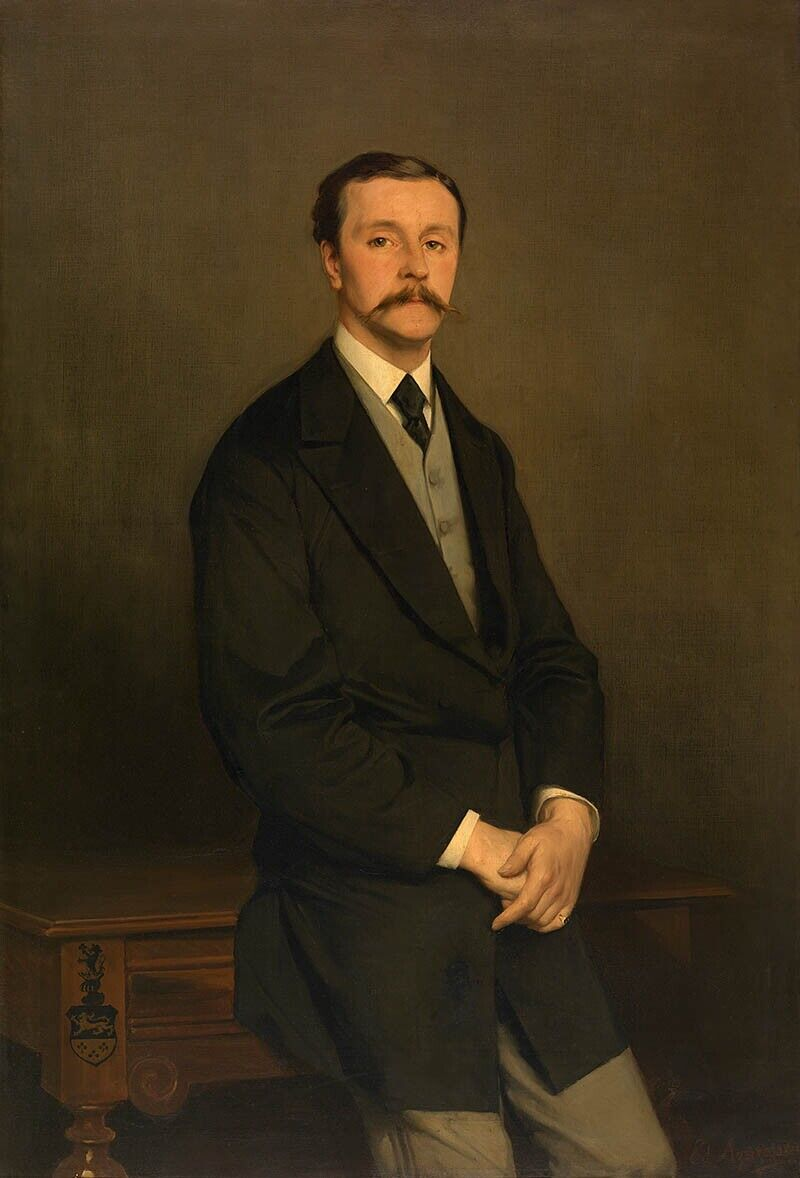

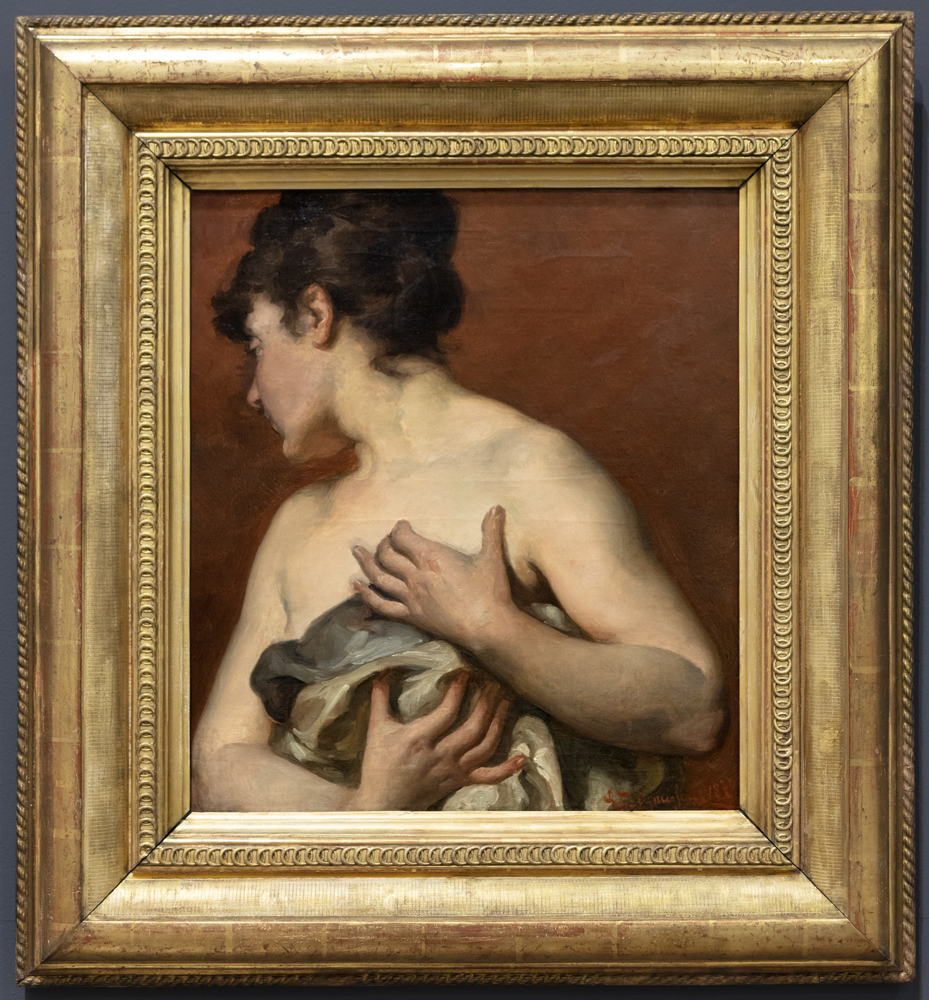

== Honours ==
- 1881: Knight in the Order of Leopold.

== Sources ==
- P. & V. Berko, 1981: Dictionary of Belgian painters born between 1750 & 1875, p. 11 Knokke
- P. Piron, 1999: De Belgische beeldende kunstenaars uit de 19de en 20ste eeuw. Art in Belgium ISBN 90-76676-01-1
- Biographie Nationale, Koninklijke Academie van België, deel XXX
