= Edouard Huberti =

Belgian painter (1818–1880)

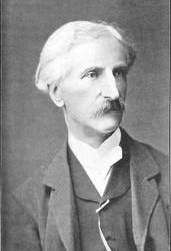
Edouard Huberti (date unknown)

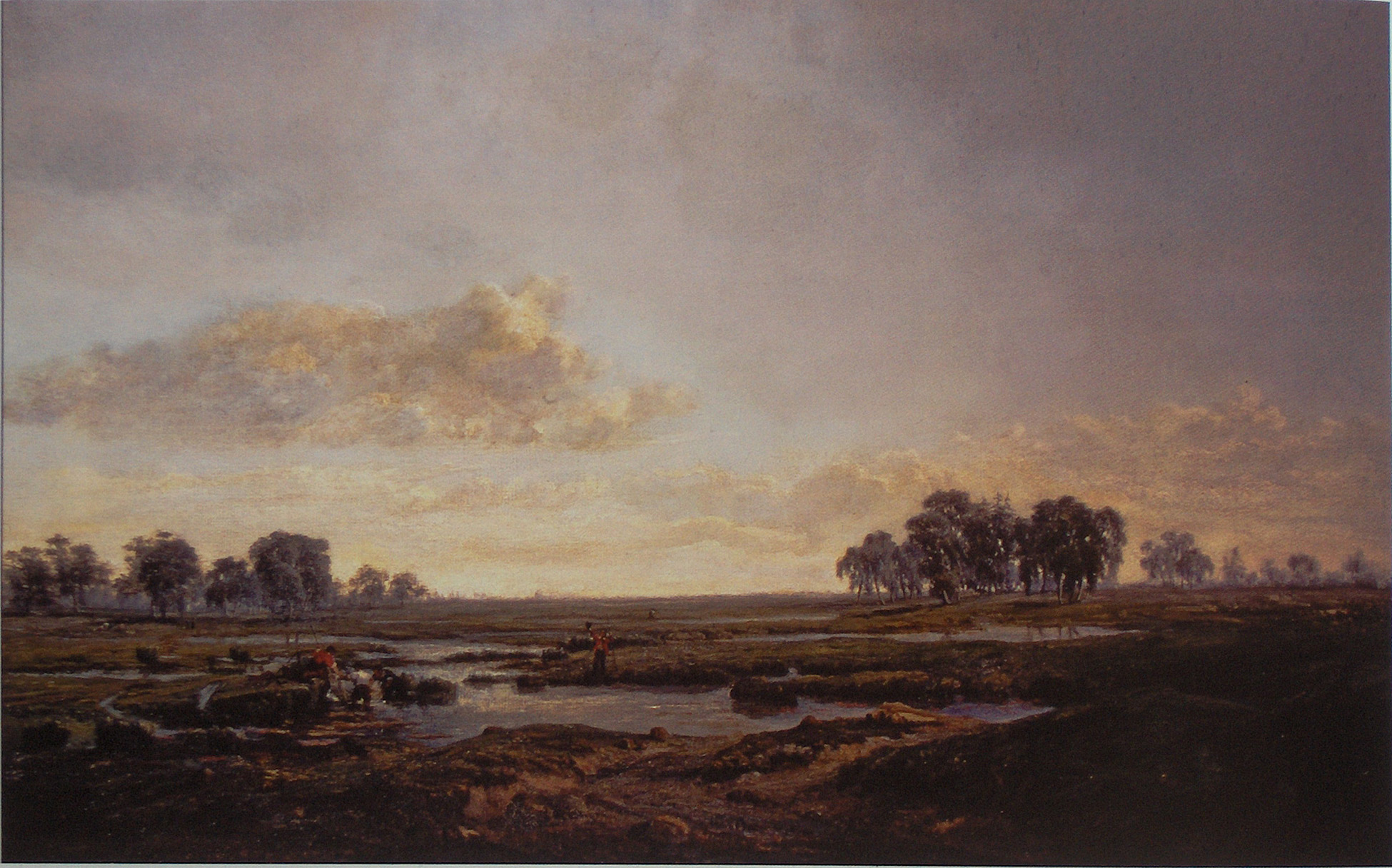
Peat Bogs in the Kempen

Edouard Jules Joseph Huberti (6 January 1818, Brussels – 12 June 1880, Schaerbeek) was a Belgian landscape painter and watercolorist.

== Biography ==
He studied architecture at the Royal Academy of Fine Arts in Antwerp, but he was also a gifted singer and violinist. For a time, he worked as a music teacher and wrote some operettas. He taught himself how to paint, produced his first simple oils on cardboard in 1837, and had a small exhibit in Brussels in 1857, but it was 1860 before he began working as a full-time artist, having been attracted to the profession by the growing public acceptance of realistic landscapes, painted en plein aire.

To improve his skills, he worked with Théodore Fourmois, who took him to paint in the woods around Tervuren. He soon became involved in the artists' colony there, attending discussions at the local tavern, which led to the founding of the School van Tervuren; one of several groups devoted to landscapes that developed in Belgium and the Netherlands around that time.

Unlike most of his peers, he preferred to paint wide open, sometimes monotonous plains, with clouds and perhaps one lonely tree. His favorite spots were in the Kempen (including Genk, the site of another artists' colony), the polders on the Scheldt, in Hainaut, and in the Meuse valley, near Anseremme, where he became involved with yet another artists' colony.

His first exhibit outside Belgium was in 1862 at the Great London Exposition. Two years later, he participated in a major exhibit of works in the realistic style, hosted by the Cercle Artistique et Littéraire.

In 1868, he became one of the founding members of the Société Libre des Beaux-Arts, and was also a member of the Société Royale Belge des Aquarellistes. He travelled to France in 1874, to make contact with members of the Barbizon School and, in 1876, was invited to become a member of the Hollandsche Teekenmaatschappij, the Dutch equivalent of the Société Royale.

Despite these involvements, he was rather introspective by nature and took no part in the controversies that arose. His personal life was largely one spent in seclusion with his family. His works received reviews that were favorable, but not enthusiastic. Toward the end of his life, he became melancholy and depressed and began painting flowers.

His son, Gustave, inherited his musical abilities; becoming a well-known musician and composer of vocal works.

== Sources ==
- Saskia De Bodt: “Edouard Huberti", in The Dictionary of Art, Vol.11; Jane Turner (Ed.), Macmillan Publishers Ltd, ISBN 1-884446-00-0
- Bénézit, "Dictionary of Artists", Ed. Gründ, Paris, 2006 ISBN 2-70003-070-2
- J. du Jardin, “L’Art flamand” IV, pp. 137–144; Brussels, 1896-1900
- S. Pierron, “Edouard Huberti”, A. Flam. & Holl., 1913
- M.E Belpaire, “Edouard Huberti 1818-1880”, Kst. & Levensbeeld, pp. 77–106, 1919
- R. Hoozee and M. Tahon-Vanroose, “Het landschap in de Belgische Kunst, 1830-1914”, exhibition catalog, pp. 104–109, MSK Ghent, 1980
