= Eugène Smits =

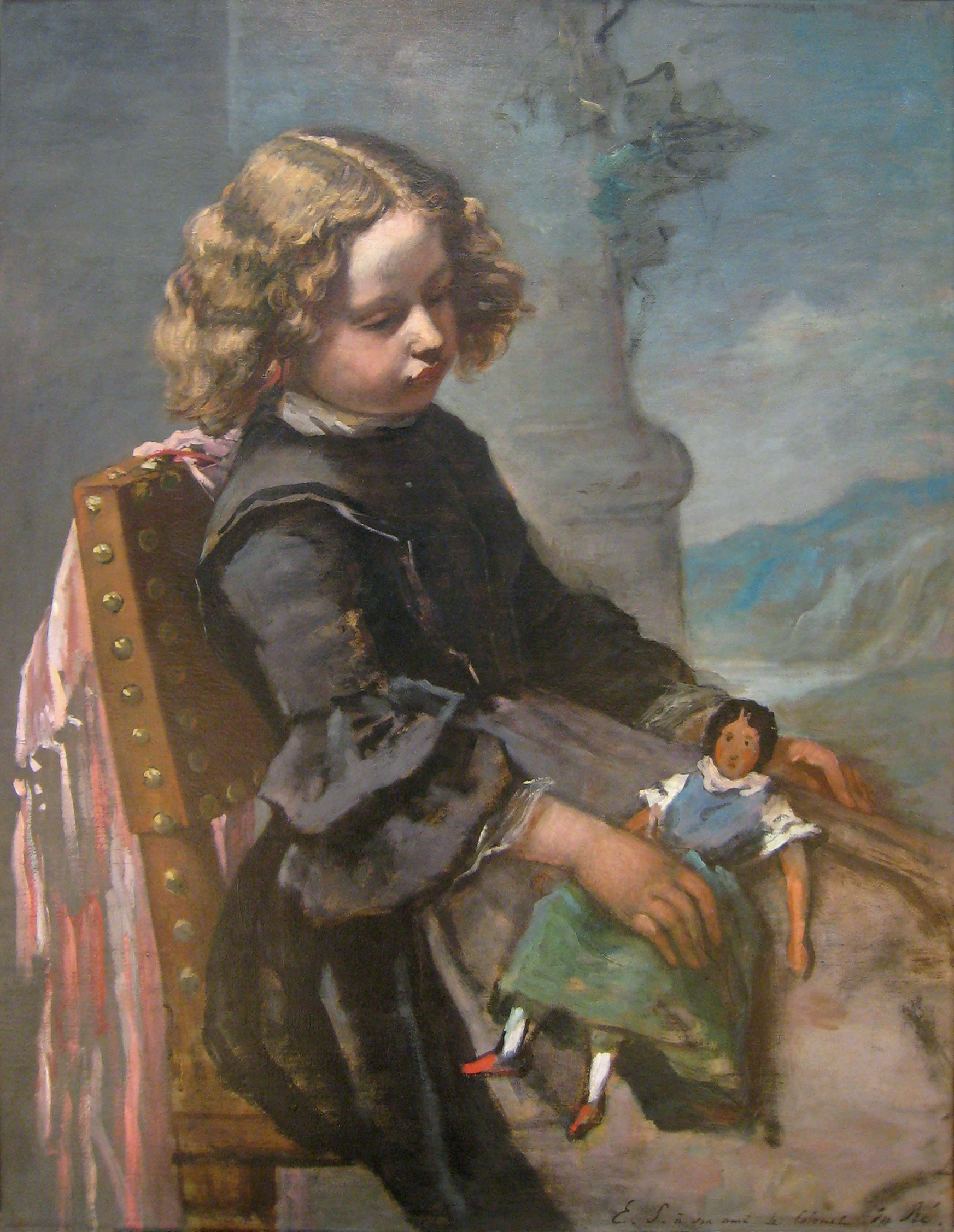
A Child with a Doll

Eugène Smits (22 May 1826, Antwerp - 4 December 1912, Brussels) was a Belgian portrait painter.

== Life and work ==
He studied at the Académie royale des Beaux-Arts de Bruxelles with François-Joseph Navez.

From 1851 to 1852, he lived in Paris, where he made the professional acquaintance of Jean-François Millet, Eugène Isabey, and the brothers Joseph and Alfred Stevens. He returned to Paris in 1855, to take part in the Exposition Universelle. From 1861 to 1864, he lived in Italy, where he created his largest canvas: "Ein Sonntagsnachmittag in Pincio" (A Sunday Afternoon in Pincio, 1862).

In 1868, he was one of the co-founders of the Société Libre des Beaux-Arts. In 1902, he was elected a member of his alma mater, the Académie royale.

He also wrote a collection of memories and reflections, Les pensées d’Eugène Smits, which was published posthumously in 1913, with illustrations by Fernand Khnopff.

== Sources ==
- "Smits, Eugène", In: Hans Vollmer (Ed.): Allgemeines Lexikon der Bildenden Künstler von der Antike bis zur Gegenwart, Vol.31: Siemering–Stephens. E. A. Seemann, Leipzig 1937.
- Smits, Eugène in: Dictionnaire des peintres belges (Online).
- Paul Lambotte: Eugène Smits, artiste-peintre (1826–1912). Forgotten Books 2019 (reprint), ISBN 978-0-365-08204-0.
