= Presles, Belgium =

Section of Aiseau-Presles, Wallonia, Belgium

Coordinates: 50°23′N 4°35′E

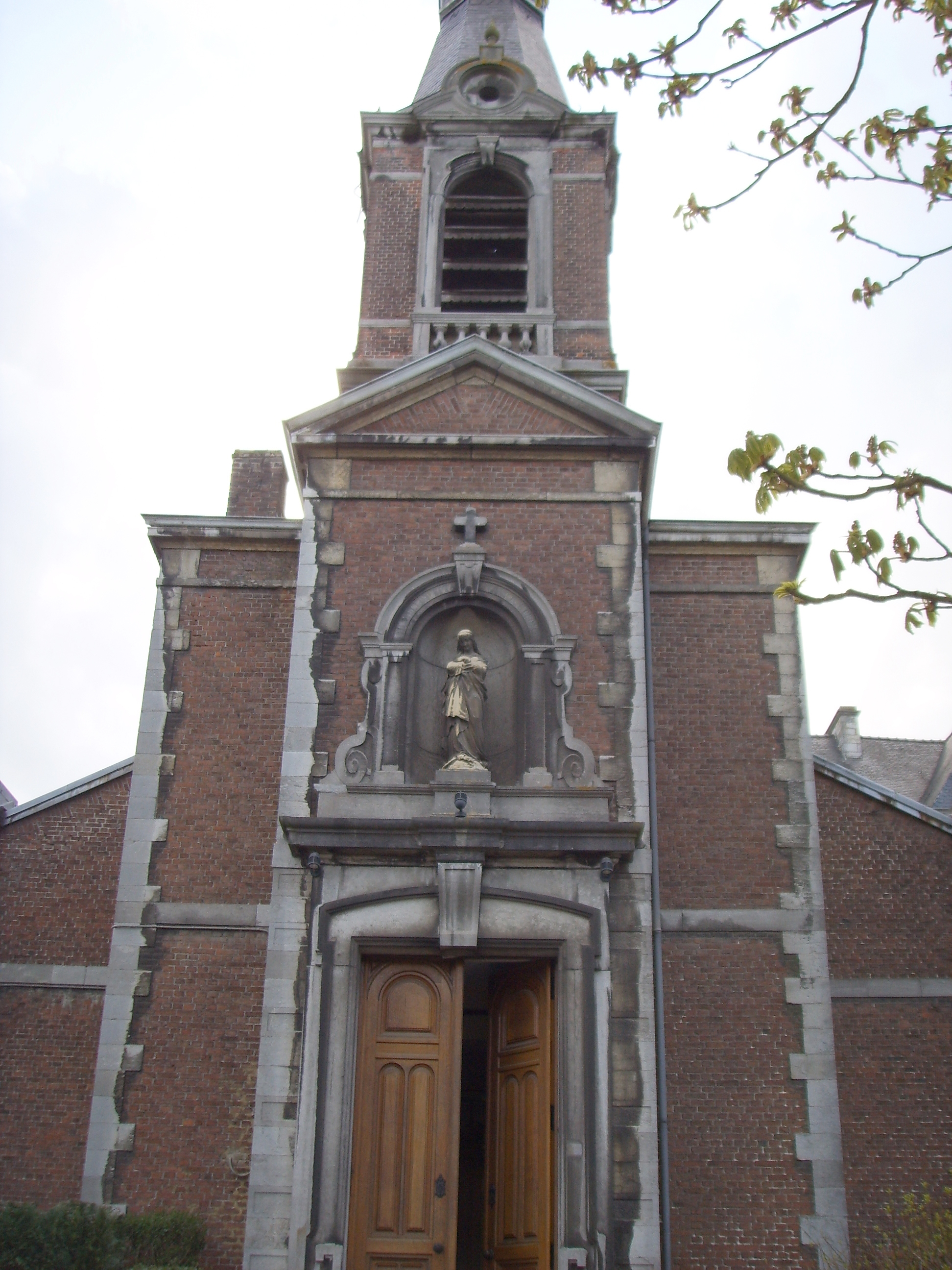
Church of Presles

Presles (French pronunciation: [pʁɛl]; Walloon: Préle) is a village of Wallonia and a district of the municipality of Aiseau-Presles, located in the province of Hainaut, Belgium.

- Postal area: 6250 (old zone 6072)
- District: Charleroi

The village has a Walloon language theatre company, Les Nerviens (meaning Nervian in English).

== History ==
The assumption a long time was put forth that the battle of Julius Caesar against the Nervians would have occurred in Presles, which was cancelled in around 1940.

Presles belonged to the Prince-Bishopric of Liège until the French occupation, after which it was added to the new department Jemappes.
