= Théodore Fourmois =

Belgian painter

- Born: Théodore Fourmois; 14 February 1814; Presles, French Empire
- Died: October 1871 (aged 57); Ixelles, Belgium
- Occupations: Painter and lithographer

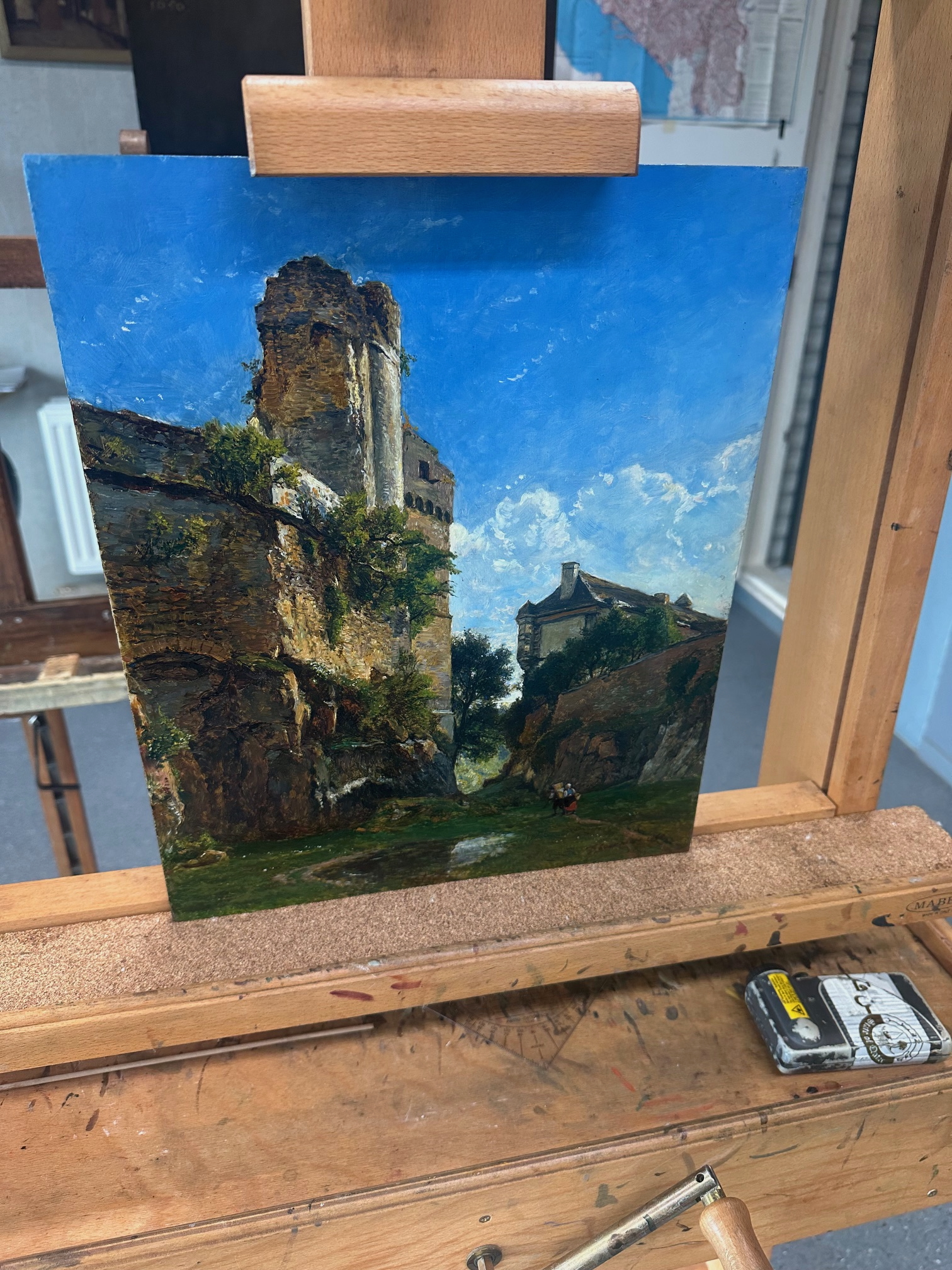

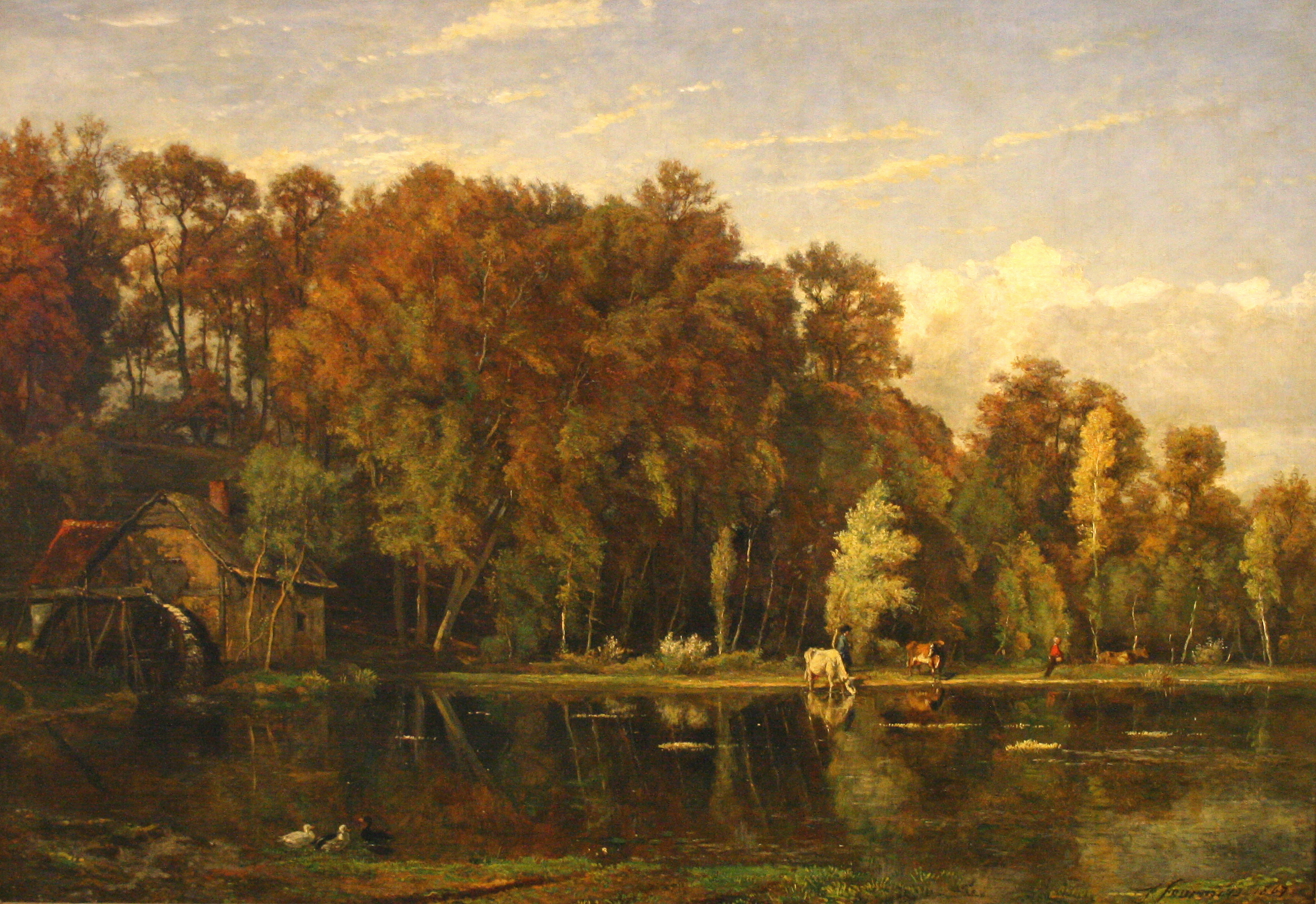
L'Étang – The Pond (1867)

Théodore Fourmois (14 October 1814 in Presles – October 1871 in Ixelles) was a Belgian landscape painter and printmaker.

Théodore Fourmois learned drawing in the lithographic's workshop of Antoine Dewasme-Pletinckx in Brussels. He first exposed his works in this city in 1836. He began painting landscapes of Ardennes and Campine, several studies and panoramic views while traveling in Dauphiné and Switzerland.

He took part, in 1855 and 1867, at the Exposition Universelle in Paris. Many of his works are exposed in the Royal Museums of Fine Arts of Belgium.
