= David de Noter =

Belgian painter (1818–1892)

- Born: June 24, 1818; Ghent
- Died: January 21, 1892 (aged 73); Bologhine

David Émile Joseph de Noter was a French painter of Belgian decent.

== Biography ==
David de Noter is the son and pupil of Jean-Baptiste de Noter (1786-1855), designer and architect, and of Carola Maya (1793-?). He is the grandson of the painter Pieter-Frans De Noter (1748-1830).

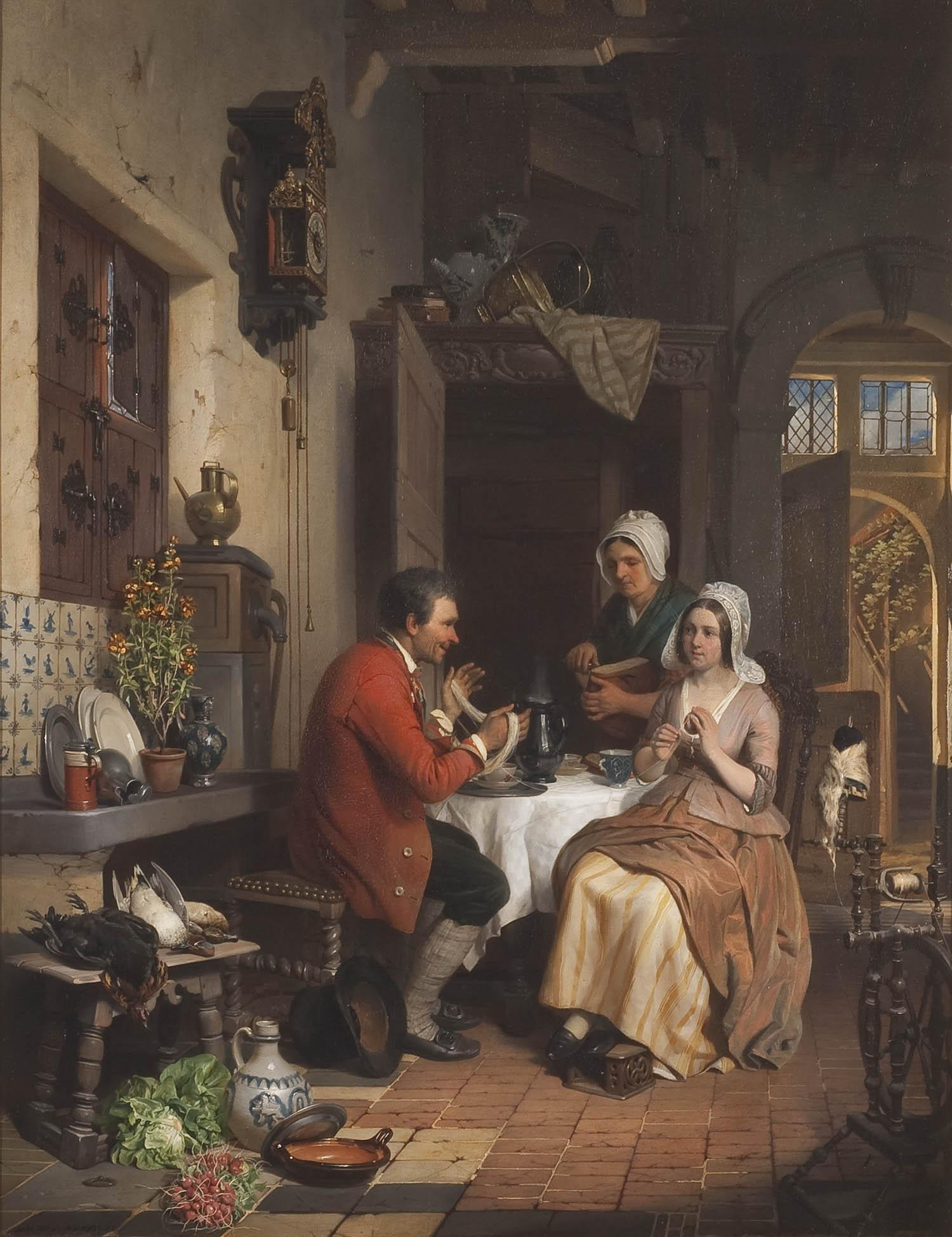
David de Noter - Kitchen interior

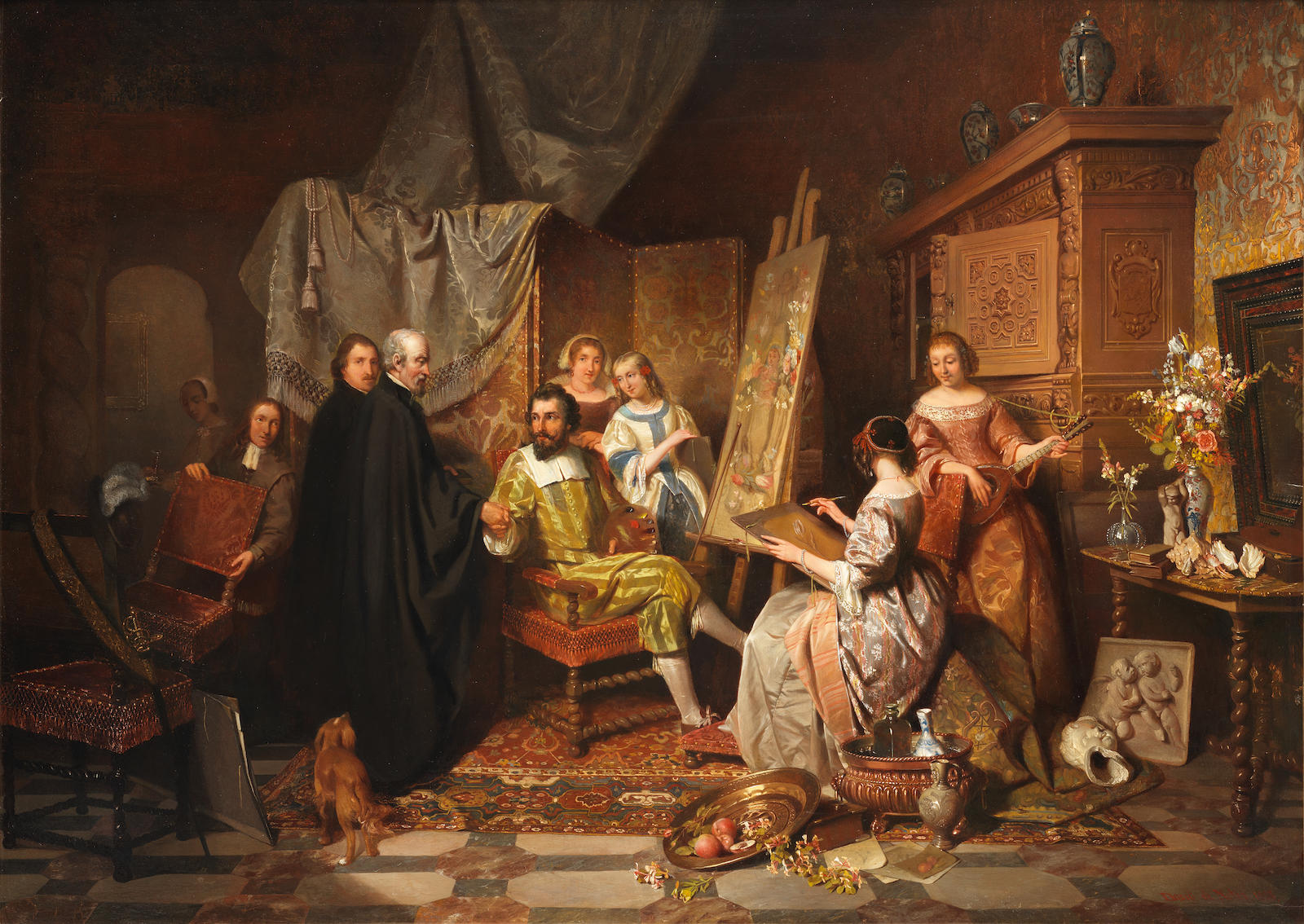
David de Noter - The artist's studio

After staying in France and more particularly in the Parisian suburbs, at Vésinet he left with his family for Algeria where he died in poverty.

=== Personal life ===
On November 25, 1845, David de Noter married Clémence Wauters (1823-1895) in Malines. From this union were born seven children: Léon-David (1848-1892), Henri-Louis (1848-1868), Marie-Henriette (1850-1904), Paul-Alexandre (1851-1858), Raphaël-Ferdinand (1856-1936), Albert-Clément (1858-1924) and Georges-Philippe (1859-1930).

The dates of his life are not completely clear. Some sources report his date of birth as 1818, and some as 1825. The same for the death date. There are three possible dates: sometime in 1875, 21 January 1892 or 28 January 1892.

== Artworks ==
He painted still lifes with flowers, vegetables, seafood, dead game and poultry and fruit, but also kitchen and salon interiors and genre scenes, almost always with a strong focus on a still life element within the scene. De Noter painted in a meticulously realistic style, but with a distinctly romantic atmosphere. During his later years, when he lived in Algiers, he also painted faces from there, such as the Kasbah of Algeria. He collaborated with Henri Leys (1815-1869), Gustav Koller, Louis Tuerlinckx (1820-1894) and Alfred Stevens (1823-1906).

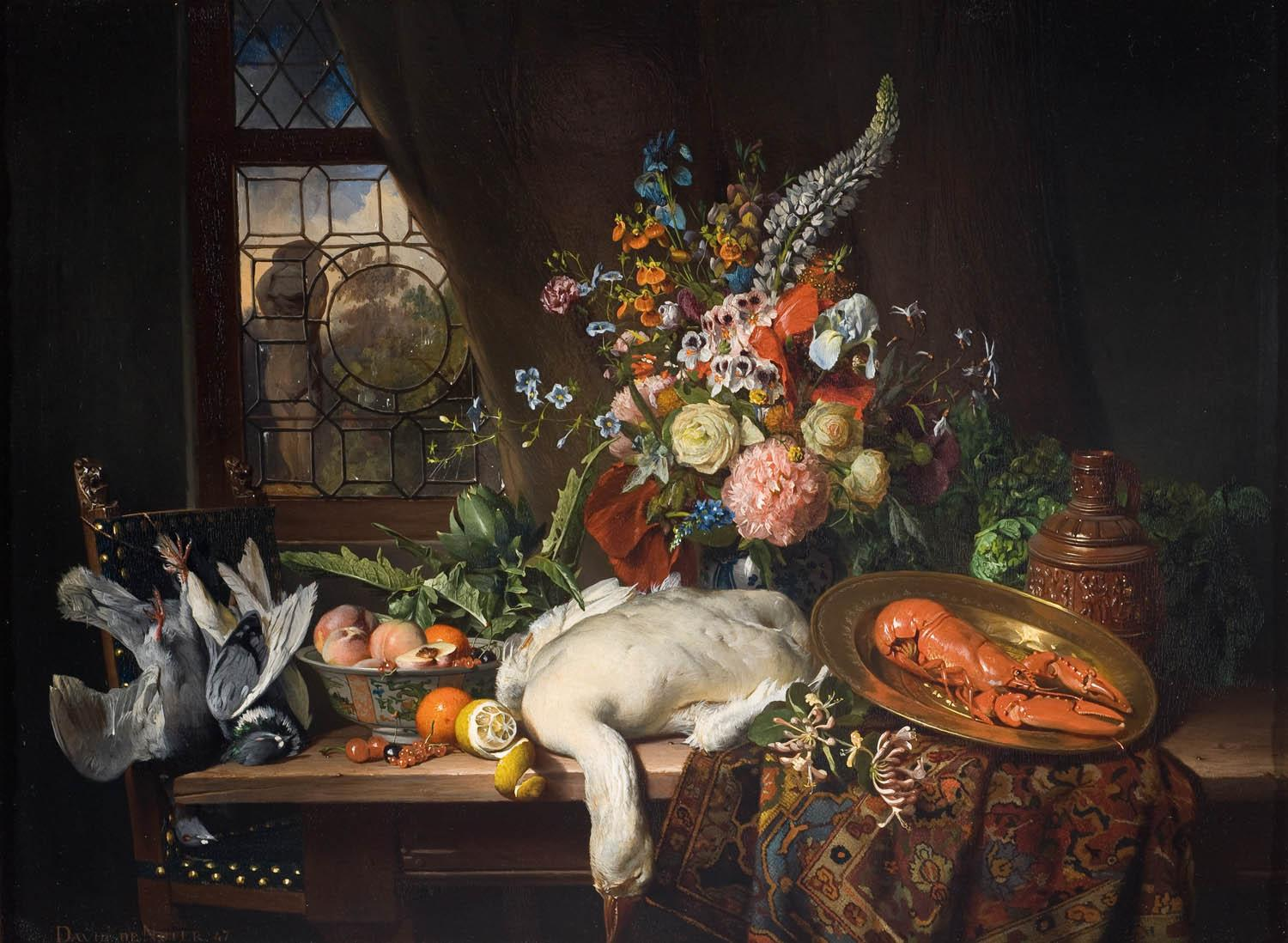
David de Noter - Still life of splendor

== Works in public collections ==
- Amsterdam, Amsterdam museum: Girl at the window, 37 × 31 cm.
- British Museum
- Berlin, Alte Nationalgalerie: Still life of flowers and fruits, oil on mahogany panel, 20 × 30 cm 6.
- Brest, Musée des Beaux-Arts: Still life with pomegranate, 1854, 56.4 × 41.5 cm 7.
- Cambrai, museum, not located.
- La Fère, Jeanne d'Aboville museum: View of the Saint Bavo church in Ghent
- Mulhouse, Musée des Beaux-Arts: La Composition du menu, gift from Frédéric Engel-Dollfus in 18658.
- Olomouc Museum of Modern Art: Still Life with Vegetables and Lobster, 1857.

== Awards ==
- 1851: Knight of the Order of Christ (Portugal)
- Knight of the Legion of Honor
