= Camille Lemonnier =

Belgian writer, poet and journalist

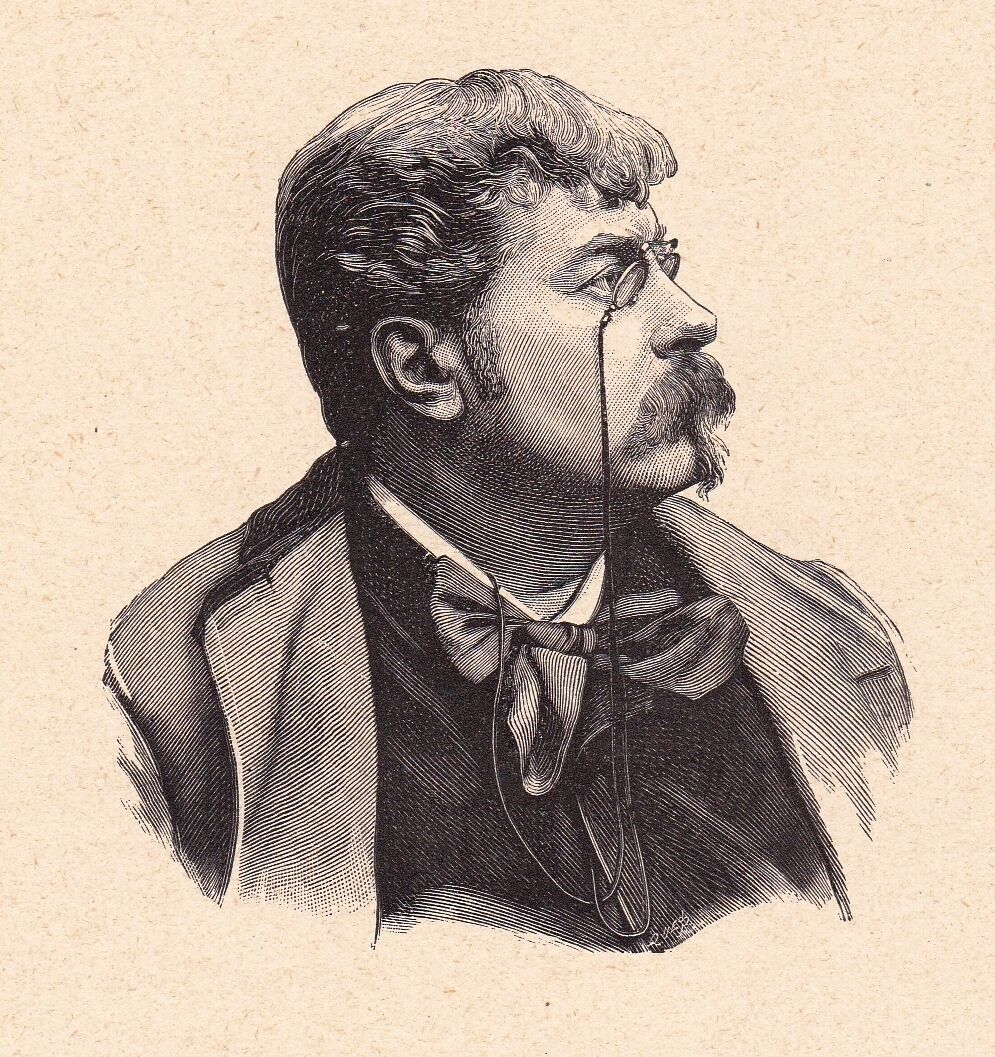
- Camille Lemonnier
- Born: Antoine Louis Camille Lemonnier; 23 March 1844; Ixelles, Belgium
- Died: 13 June 1913 (aged 69); Ixelles, Belgium
- Occupations: journalist, poet, writer

Antoine Louis Camille Lemonnier (French pronunciation: [ɑ̃twan lwi kamij ləmɔnje]; 23 March 1844 – 13 June 1913) was a Belgian writer, poet and journalist. He was a member of the Symbolist La Jeune Belgique group, but his best known works are realist. His first work was Salon de Bruxelles (1863), a collection of art criticism. His best known novel is Un Mâle (1881).

== Biography ==
Lemonnier was born in Ixelles, Brussels.

He studied law, and then took a clerkship in a government office, which he resigned after three years. He published a Salon de Bruxelles in 1863, and again in 1866. His early friendships were chiefly with artists; and he wrote art criticisms with recognized discernment. In 1868 he was a founding member of the Société Libre des Beaux-Arts, an avant-gardist group whose ideals he championed. Taking a house in the hills near Namur, he devoted himself to sport, and developed the intimate sympathy with nature which informs his best work. Nos Flamands (1869) and Croquis d'automne (1870) date from this time. Paris-Berlin (1870), a pamphlet pleading the cause of France, and full of the author's horror of war, had a great success.

His capacity as a novelist, in the fresh, humorous description of peasant life, was revealed in Un Coin de village (1879). In Un Mâle (1881) he achieved a different kind of success. It deals with the amours of a poacher and a farmer's daughter, with the forest as a background. Cachaprès, the poacher, seems the very embodiment of the wild life around him. The rejection of Un Mâle by the judges for the quinquennial prize of literature in 1883 made Lemonnier the centre of a school, inaugurated at a banquet given in his honour on 27 May 1883. Le Mort (1882), which describes the remorse of two peasants for a murder they have committed, provides a vivid representation of terror. It was remodelled as a tragedy in five acts (1899) by its author. Ceux de la glèbe (1889), dedicated to the "children of the soil", was written in 1885.

He turned aside from local subjects for some time to produce a series of psychological novels, books of art criticism, etc., of considerable value, but assimilating more closely to French contemporary literature. The most striking of his later novels include Happe-chair (1886), often compared with Zola's Germinal, L'Arche, journal d'une maman (1894) and Le Vent dans les moulins (1901), which returns to Flemish subjects.

In 1888 Lemonnier was prosecuted in Paris for offending against public morals by a story in Gil Blas, and was condemned to a fine. In a later prosecution at Brussels he was defended by Edmond Picard, and acquitted; and he was arraigned for a third time, at Bruges, for his L'Homme en amour, but again acquitted. He represented his own case in Les Deux consciences (1902). L'Ile vierge (1897) was the first of a trilogy to be called La Légende de la vie, which was to trace, under the fortunes of the hero, the pilgrimage of man through sorrow and sacrifice to the conception of the divinity within him. In Adam et Eve (1899) and Au Cœur frais de la forêt (1900), he preached the return to nature as the salvation not only of the individual but of the community. Among his other more important works are G. Courbet, et ses œuvres (1878); L'Histoire des Beaux-Arts en Belgique 1830–1887 (1887); En Allemagne (1888), dealing especially with the Pinakothek at Munich; La Belgique (1888), an elaborate descriptive work with many illustrations; La Vie belge (1905); and Alfred Stevens et son œuvre (1906).

Lemonnier spent much time in Paris, and was one of the early contributors to the Mercure de France. He began to write at a time when Belgian letters lacked style; and with much toil, and some initial extravagances, he created a medium for the expression of his ideas. He explained something of the process in a preface contributed to Gustave Abel's Labeur de la prose (1902). His prose is magnificent and sonorous, but abounds in neologisms and strange metaphors.

Rue Camille Lemonnier/Camille Lemonnierstraat in western Ixelles, is named in his honour.

== Works ==
- Salon de Bruxelles (1863)
- Nos Flamands (1869)
- Croquis d'automne (1870)
- Paris-Berlin (1870)
- G. Courbet, et ses œuvres (1878)
- Un Coin de village (1879)
- Un Mâle (1881)
- Le Mort (1882)
- L'Hystérique (1885)
- Happe-chair (1886)
- L'Histoire des Beaux-Arts en Belgique 1830–1887 (1887)
- En Allemagne (1888)
- La Belgique (1888)
- Ceux de la glèbe (1889)
- Le Possédé (1890)
- La fin des bourgeois (1892)
- L'Arche, journal d'une maman (1894)
- La Faute de Mme Charvet (1895)
- L'Ile vierge (1897)
- L'Homme en amour (1897)
- Adam et Eve (1899)
- Au Cœur frais de la forêt (1900)
- C'était l'été (1900)
- Le Vent dans les moulins (1901)
- Le Petit Homme de Dieu (1902)
- Comme va le ruisseau (1903)
- Alfred Stevens et son œuvre (1906)
