= Société Libre des Beaux-Arts =

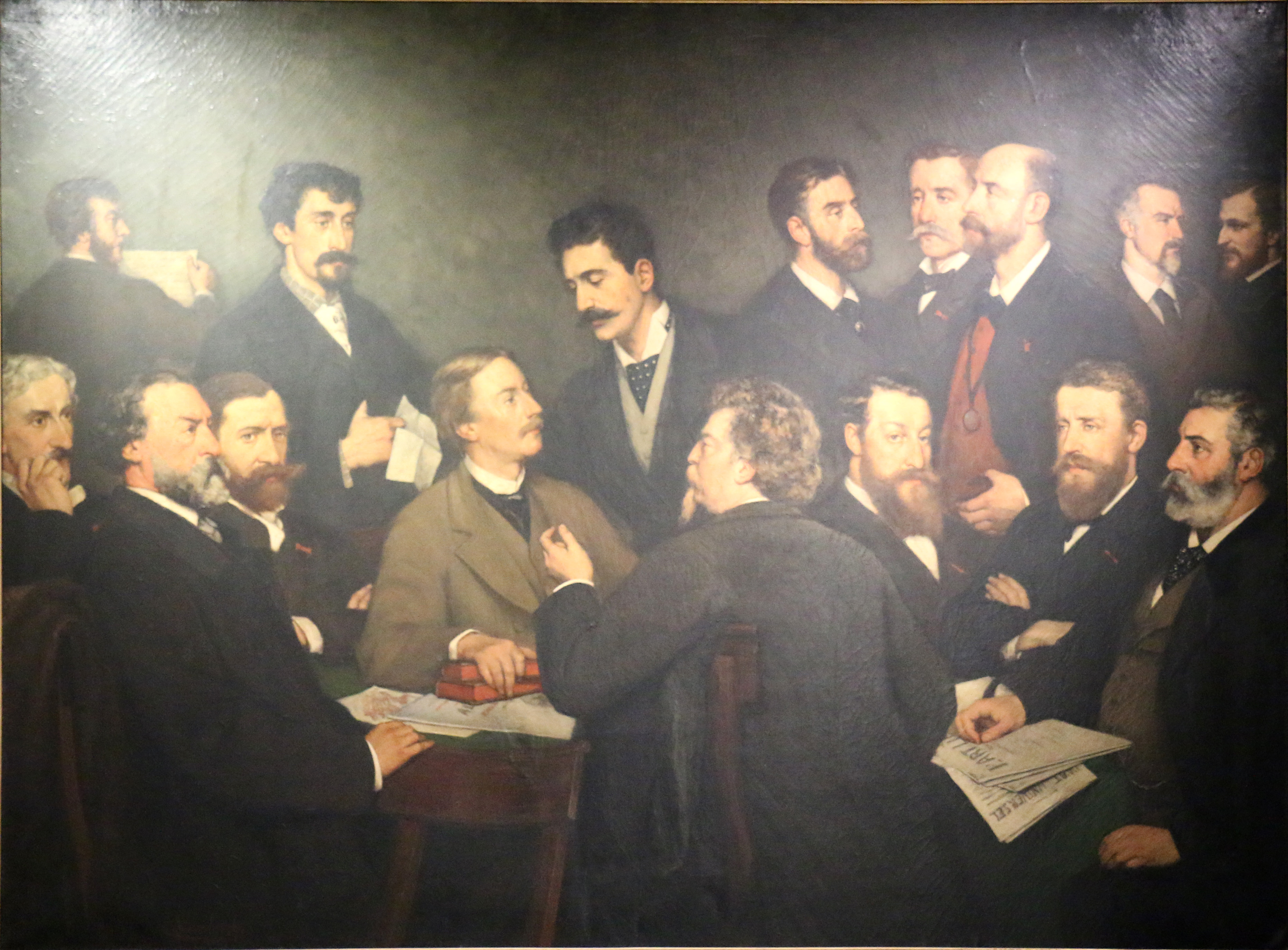
The Members of the Société Libre des Beaux-Arts by Edmond Lambrichs : from left to right, sitting are Huberti, Boudin, Degroux, Van Camp, Bouré, Verwée, C. Meunier, Dubois (holding copies of L'Art libre and L'Art Universel); standing, Lambrichs, Artan, Rops, Raeymaeckers, J.B. Meunier, Smits, Baron, De la Charlerie

The Société Libre des Beaux-Arts ("Free Society of Fine Arts") was an organization formed in 1868 by Belgian artists to react against academicism and to advance Realist painting and artistic freedom. Based in Brussels, the society was active until 1876, by which time the aesthetic values it espoused had infiltrated the official Salon. It played a formative role in establishing avant-gardism in Belgium.

== History ==
The first exhibition of the Free Society was held in 1868 to provide an alternative art space beyond the Salon. Three exhibitions were held in 1872. The society's manifesto was written by Camille van Camp and published 31 January, 1869. It emphasized the "free and individual interpretation of nature," a hallmark of Realist art, while also embracing avant-garde ideals such as struggle, transformation, liberty, progress, innovation, and inclusivity."

The society published the periodicals L'Art Libre, a bi-monthly review (1871–72), and L'Art Universel (1873–76). In the first issue of L'Art Libre, they collectively asserted:

Artistic independence must be spawned by force. It is our desire that art be free. The art of our time must return to man and nature.

The goals of the Free Society were influenced by aesthetic ideals set forth by Gustave Courbet and the Barbizon artists and by the poet Charles Baudelaire. "Modernity" and "sincerity" were keywords. Official cultural critics were at first openly hostile. Two early champions, however, were the critics Camille Lemonnier, a member, who urged that they should "be of their own time," and Théo Hannon (1851-1916), who saw them as rebels against artificiality.

== Membership ==
A group portrait by society member Edmond Lambrichs shows the 16 artists of the original organizing committee. The society attracted in particular landscape painters working at the Atelier Saint-Luc of Brussels, also known as the Académie de Saint-Luc (ca. 1846–1864). Louis Dubois, Félicien Rops, Constantin Meunier and Louis Artan de Saint-Martin are considered leading members.

Most of the society's members had also belonged to the Artistic and Literary Circle of Brussels and the Royal Belgian Society of Watercolorists. After the society dissolved, several members joined groups such as La Chrysalide and Les XX.

== List of original members ==
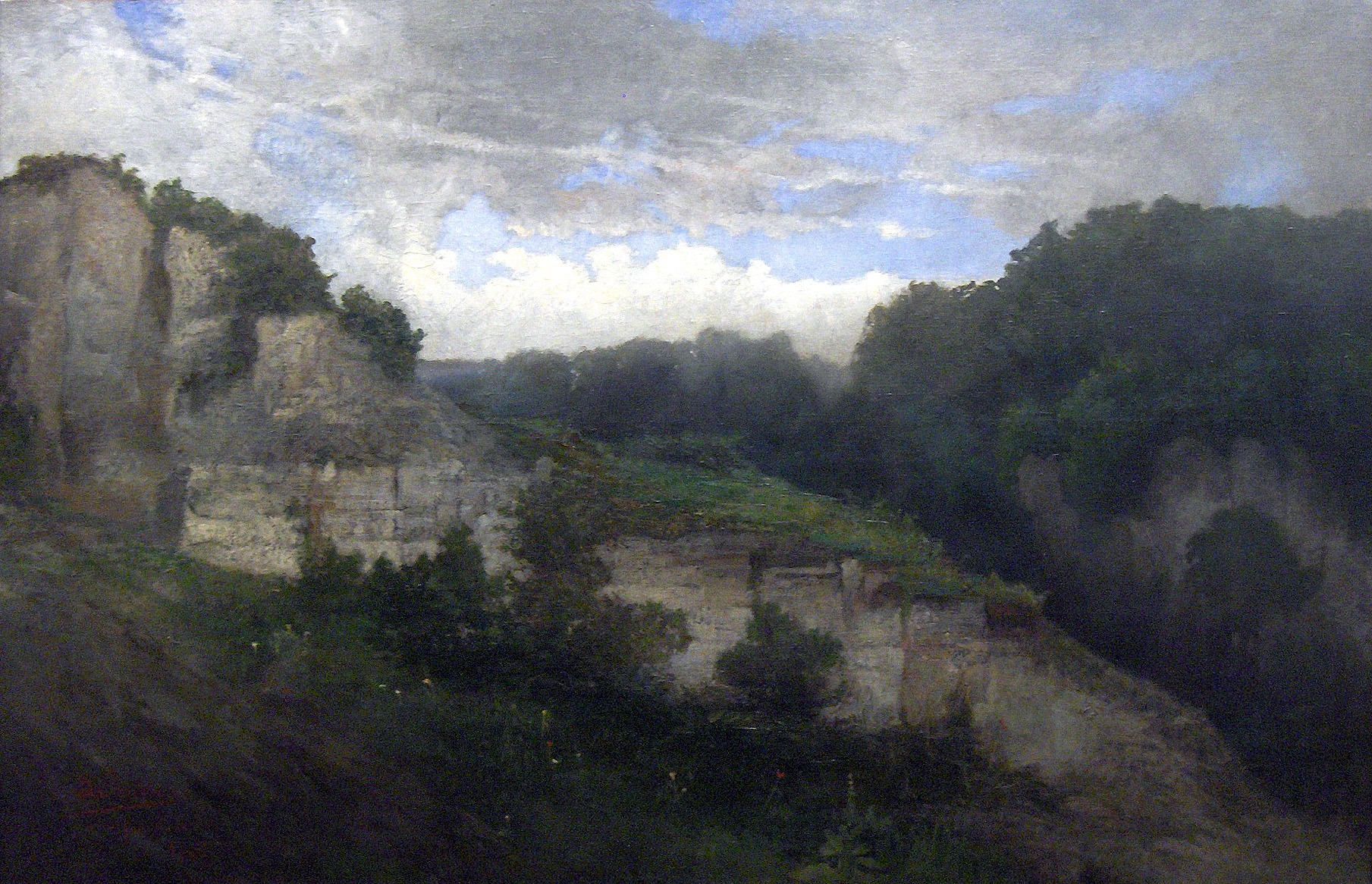
The Heights of Beez (1861) by Louis Dubois; landscape painters were prominent among the Société Libre des Beaux-Arts

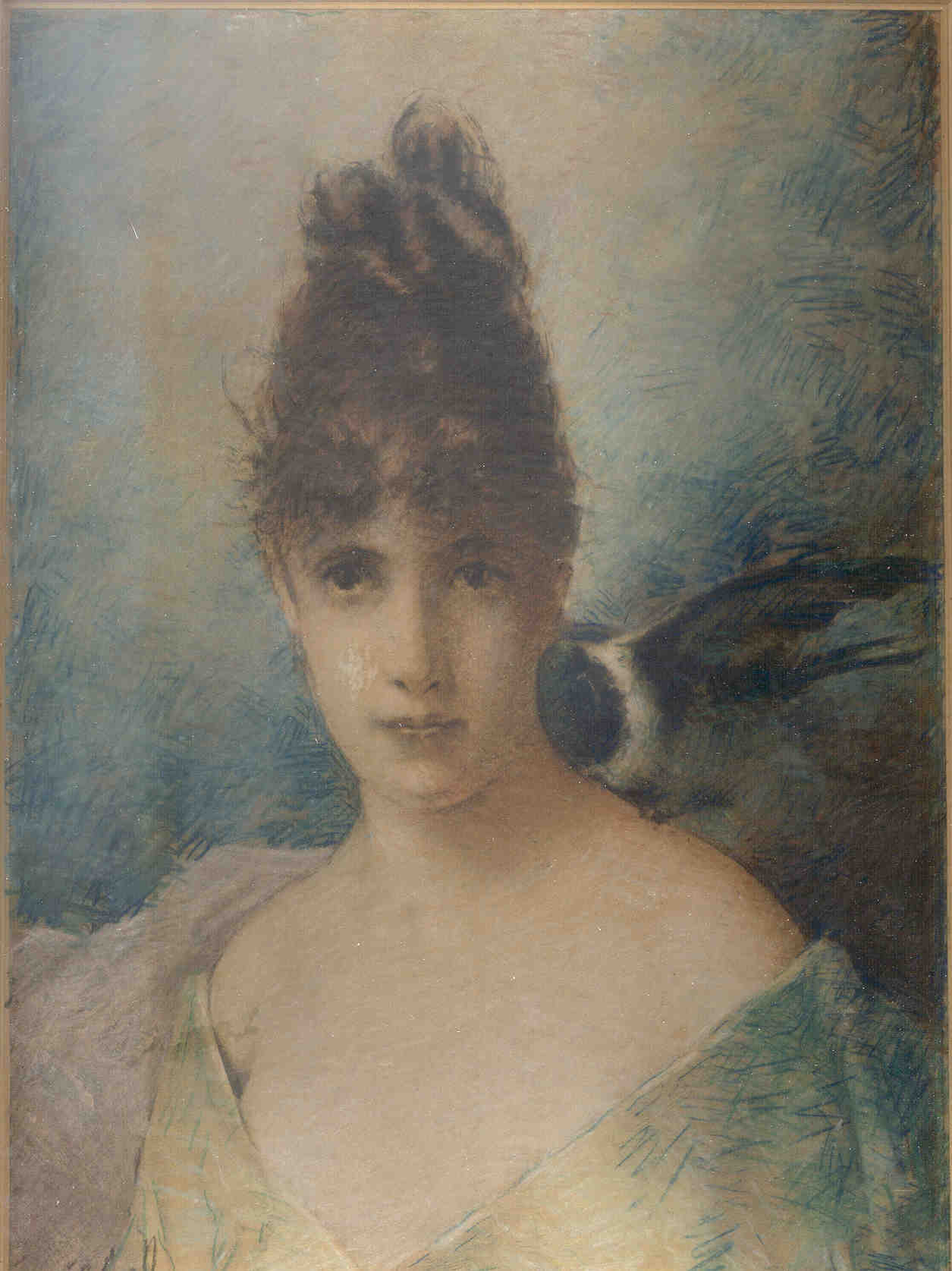
Portrait of a Young Woman with a Magpie by society member Eugène Smits

- Edouard Agneessens
- Louis Artan de Saint-Martin
- Alphonse Asselbergs
- Théodore Baron
- Antoine-Félix Bouré
- Paul Jean Clays
- Marie Collart-Henrotin
- Joseph Coosemans
- Charles de Groux
- Hippolyte de la Charlerie
- Louis Dubois
- Adrien-Joseph Heymans
- Edouard Huberti
- Edmond Lambrichs
- Paul Lauters
- Camille Lemonnier
- Constantin Meunier
- Jules Raeymaekers
- Félicien Rops
- Eugène Smits
- Camille van Camp
- Henri Van der Hecht
- Isidore Verheyden
- Alfred Verwee

The society expressed an internationalist desire by inviting Courbet, Corot, Charles-François Daubigny, Théodore Rousseau and Jean-François Millet to join as honorary members.

== See also ==
- List of Belgian painters
- Les XX
