= Brussels Salon =

Art exhibition in Brussels, Belgium

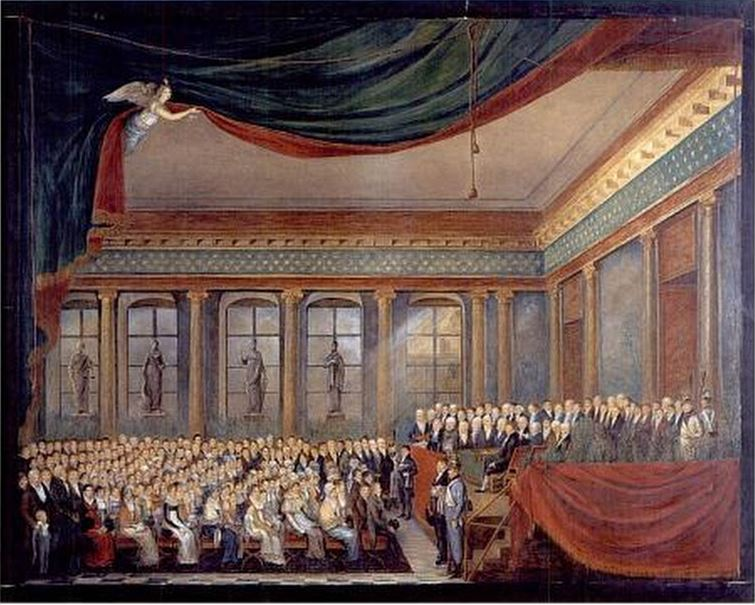
Award Ceremony at the first Salon of 1811, gouache by Marie de Latour

The Brussels Salon (French: Salon de Bruxelles; Dutch: Salon van Brussel) was a periodic exhibition of works by living artists that was held in Brussels, Belgium, between 1811 and 1914. It was primarily aimed at painters, but sculptors, draughtsmen, engravers and architects were also present. Participants were given a unique opportunity to present their work to the general public and to offer it for sale if desired. They could also enter anonymously in a competition whose first prize was a gold medal. The catalogues were eagerly received and newspapers and art critics followed the event closely. The national Museum of Fine Arts was enriched mainly by works purchased at the Salon.

== History ==
=== Origins and inception ===
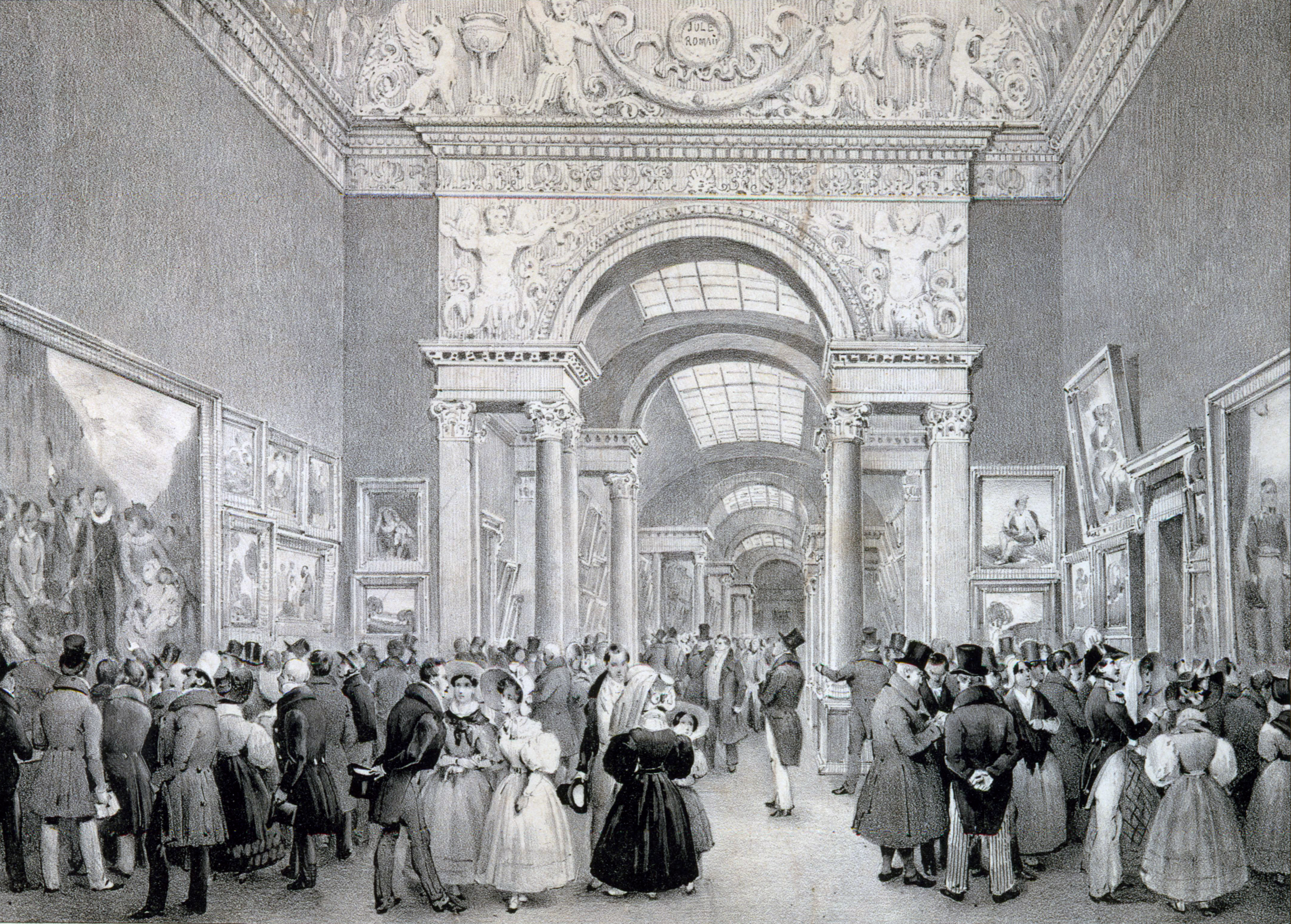
The Salon of 1830 in the Palace of Charles of Lorraine, rendered by Jean-Baptiste Madou

Antwerp, in 1789, then Ghent, in 1792, were the first cities in the Low Countries to set up a Salon following the example of Paris. In 1803, these initiatives were followed in Brussels, where a painting museum was opened in the Palace of Charles of Lorraine. In the summer of that year, it hosted a first exhibition of contemporary artists, organised by the Société de peinture, sculpture et architecture de Bruxelles ("Brussels Society of Painting, Sculpture and Architecture").

The real starting point for the Salon came in 1811. Under the impetus of Charles-Joseph, 4th Duke d'Ursel, and the Ghent bibliophile Charles van Hulthem, the Société de Bruxelles pour l'encouragement des beaux-arts ("Brussels Society for the Encouragement of Fine Arts") was founded. On 4 November, visitors could attend the first edition (in the autumn, so as not to compete with the Paris Salon). A jury had selected the participants, while another jury had awarded the prizes (painting, landscape, sculpture, architecture and drawing) on 17 November, in the presence of some forty artists. From the outset, it was planned that the Ghent and Brussels salons would alternate annually. As Antwerp also established a Salon in 1813, a triennial system was adopted, with each city organising its own Salon alternately.

In 1817, King William I of the Netherlands concluded a general arrangement on the organisation of official exhibitions in the Southern Netherlands. In 1830, the Salon coincided with the third General Exhibition of the Products of National Industry. The new Grand Gallery had just opened and had received, among other works, The Sacrifice of Mayor Pieter van der Werff by Gustave Wappers. It drew sharp criticism from his colleague François-Joseph Navez, and two camps were formed. However, the work was a great success with the crowds, as its exhibition was held just before the Belgian Revolution broke out in September 1830, and the organising association decided to withdraw in view of the context of unrest in the kingdom. The government of the newly independent Belgium saw an opportunity to take the organisation into its own hands and gave a more national interpretation to the concept. From the next edition in 1833, the Salon was known as the Exposition nationale des Beaux-Arts ("National Exhibition of Fine Arts"). Historical pieces were strongly encouraged to legitimise the new state. Visitors were granted free admission during the September festivities (until 1880).

=== Prominence, criticism and decline ===
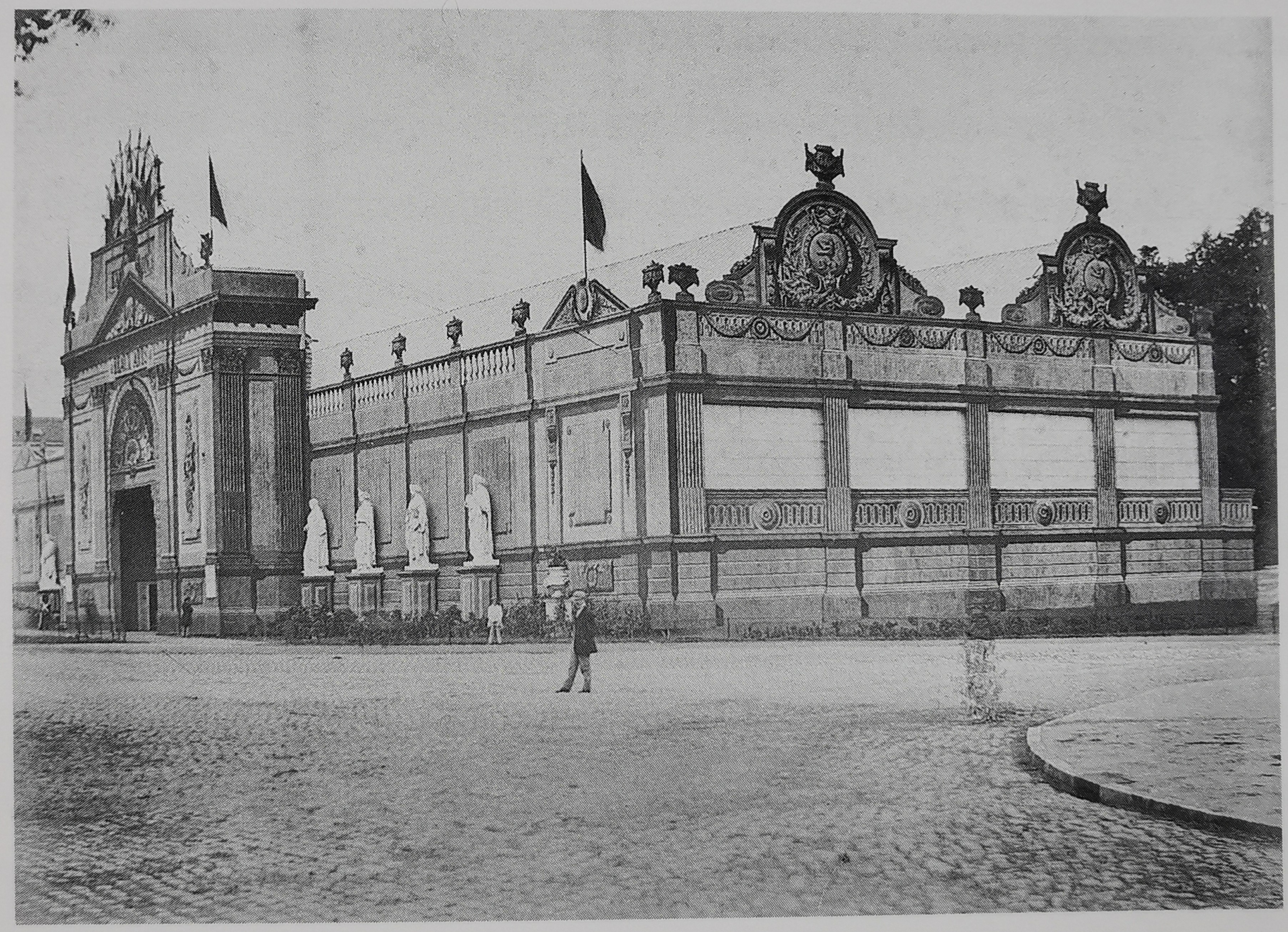
Temporary pavilion of the Salon of 1863, Place du Trône/Troonplein

In the 19th century, the institutional art system limited the possibilities for exhibitions. Apart from the initiatives of a few circles organising artistic events and charity exhibitions, official exhibitions were a crucial step for artists seeking visibility. While such exhibitions existed in many Belgian cities, those of Brussels, Antwerp and Ghent were the only ones to claim a national character and were part of a triennial system that ensured their periodicity. The official nature of the Brussels Salon was due to the direct intervention of the State in its organisation.

In spite of its success, the Brussels Salon began to be challenged through the actions of intellectual circles. In 1845, the Les Joyeux society held its first Salon caricatural ("Caricatural Salon"). The student-like group published its own "catalogue", in which it mocked the lack of innovation. Its members included the future writer Charles de Coster and the young artist Félicien Rops, who published Le Diable au Salon (1851) at the age of eighteen. The group continued its satire until 1869.

A new step was reached with the 1851 edition. An effort was made to attract foreign artists, and to emphasize this, the Salon was henceforth called the Exposition générale des Beaux-Arts ("General Exhibition of Fine Arts"). Realism began to manifest itself, but met fierce resistance. In the decades that followed, modern movements gained a foothold. Art critics such as Émile Verhaeren and Camille Lemonnier proved to be keen observers.

The decline of the official Salon began with the increase of private initiatives (the Société Libre des Beaux-Arts ("Free Society of Fine Arts") was one of the first, later followed by groups such as Les XX, La Libre Esthétique, Pour l'Art, etc.). For the 1887 edition, the selection committee halved the number of participants, but this did little to improve quality. The rejected artists retaliated by organising a Salon des Refusés ("Salon of the Refused") at the Musée du Nord, following the example of the 1863 Salon in Paris, alongside the official Salon. Artistic circles argued in favour of privatising the Salon, and this option was partly accepted in 1893. A new Société des Beaux-Arts (de Bruxelles) ("Society of Fine Arts (of Brussels)") was entrusted with the organisation, albeit still under government control. Alongside the grand Salon, it also organised annual exhibitions (the first in 1894; from 1908 called the Salon du Printemps ("Spring Salon")). The tradition of the triennial Salons continued until 1914. After that, despite declarations of intent, the Salon was not revived.

== See also ==
- Sculpture in Brussels
- History of Brussels
- Culture of Belgium
- Belgium in the long nineteenth century
