= List of Belgian painters =

This is a list of Belgian painters. Where available, it includes the painter's place and year of birth; the place and year of death; and painting style.

For painters from this region before 1830, see List of Flemish painters.

== A ==
- Pierre Abattucci (1871–1942)
- Robert Aerens (Born in Ghent) (1883–1969)
- Edouard Agneessens (1842–1885)
- Pierre Alechinsky (born in Brussels, 1927) – Contemporary
- Harold Ancart (born 1980)
- Carla Arocha (born in Caracas, Venezuela)
- Alphonse Asselbergs (born in Brussels) (1839–1916)

== B ==
- Albert Baertsoen (1866–1922) – Impressionism
- Émile Baes (12 November 1879, Brussels – 3 January 1953, Paris) Post-Impressionism
- Firmin Baes (born in Saint-Josse-ten-Noode, 1874 – died in Uccle, 1943) – Impressionism
- Rachel Baes (born in Ixelles, 1912 – died in Bruges, 1983) – Surrealism
- Piet Bekaert (1939–2000) – Impressionism
- Anna Boch (1848–1936) – Neo-Impressionism
- Eugène Boch (1855–1941) – Impressionism
- Gaston Bogaert (1918–2008) – Surrealism
- Michaël Borremans (born in Geraardsbergen, 1963)
- Hippolyte Boulenger (1837–1874) – Realism
- Virginie Bovie (1821–1888) – eclectic painter with Flemish Baroque, Romantic, and Realist influences
- Ignace Brice (born in Brussels, 1795 – died in Brussels, 1866), Neoclassicism
- Jean Brusselmans (born in Brussels, 1884 – died in Dilbeek, 1953) Fauvism
- Louis Buisseret (born in Binche, 1888 – died in Brussels, 1956)
- André Buzin (born 1946) – paints animals and flowers

== C ==
- Nestor Cambier (born in Couillet, 1879 – died in Brussels, 1957) – portraiture, landscapes, city views, still lifes, murals, drawings
- Jean-Baptiste Capronnier (born in Brussels, 1814 – died in Brussels, 1891) – stained-glass painter
- Jacques Carabain (born in Amsterdam, 1834 – died in Schaerbeek, 1933) – Cityscape painter
- Marcel Caron (born in Enghien, 1890 – died in Liège, 1961) – Expressionism
- Évariste Carpentier (born in Kuurne, 1845 – died in Liège, 1922) – Naturalism, Impressionism
- Anto Carte (born in Mons, 1886 – died in Ixelles, 1954) – Symbolism, Expressionism
- François Cautaerts (born in Brussels, 1810 – died in Brussels, 1881) – historical and religious themed paintings
- Cécile Cauterman (born in Ghent, 1882 – died in Ghent, 1957) – drawings
- Caroline Chariot-Dayez (born in Brussels, 1958) – Hyperrealism
- Emile Claus (born in Sint-Eloois-Vijve, 1849 – died in Astene, 1924) – Impressionism
- Paul Jean Clays (born in Bruges, 1819 – died in Brussels, 1900) – Marine painting
- Jan Cockx (born in Antwerp, 1891 – died in Antwerp, 1976) – painter and ceramicist
- Jean Baptiste Leopold Colin (1881–1961) – portraits, nudes, and still lifes
- Omer Coppens (born in Dunkirk, 1864 – died in Ixelles, 1926) – Impressionist painter, ceramic artist
- Léon Corthals (born in Temse, 1877 – died in Ixelles, 1935) – portraiture
- Franz Courtens (born in Dendermonde 1854 – died in Saint-Josse-ten-Noode 1943), Pleinairisme, landscape and marine painting
- Jan Cox (born in The Hague, 1919 – died in Antwerp, 1980) – Avant-garde, Abstract art, Figurative
- Luc-peter Crombé (born in Opwijk, 1920 – died 2005)

== D ==
- Paul Daxhelet (born in Liège, 1905 – died in Liège, 1993) – Orientalism
- Hugo Debaere (born in Ghent, 1958 – died in Ghent, 1994) – Avant-garde
- Fritz de Brouckère (born in Brussels, 1879 – died in Brussels, 1928) – Impressionism, Symbolism
- Jan De Cock (born in Brussels, 1976) – Contemporary
- Jos De Cock (born in Kortrijk, 1934 – died in Paris, 2010)
- Henry de Groux (born in Brussels, 1866 – died in Saint-Josse-ten-Noode, 1930) – Symbolism
- Carole Dekeijser – Contemporary
- Raoul De Keyser (born in Deinze, 1930–2012) – Abstract
- Hippolyte de la Charlerie (1827–1869) – painter and illustrator
- Basile De Loose (born in Zele, 1809 – died in Brussels, 1885) – portrait and genre painter
- Paul Delvaux (born in Antheit (Wanze) 1897 – died in Veurne, 1994) – Surrealism
- Jean Delville (1867–1953) – Symbolism
- André de Meulemeester (1894–1973) – Flemish-Belgian painter 1917
- Jos de Mey (1928–2007) – Flemish-Belgian painter, primarily of impossible objects in a photo-realistic style
- Albert Demuyser born in Laeken (1920–2003)
- William Degouve de Nuncques (born in Monthermé, 1867 – died 1935) – Symbolism
- Gustave De Smet (born in Ghent, 1877 – died in Deurle (Sint-Martens-Latem), 1943) – Expressionism
- Albrecht De Vriendt (Ghent, 8 December 1843 – Antwerp, 14 October 1900) – Belgian painter known for his genre scenes, history paintings, interiors and figure paintings
- The de Vriendt brothers (Juliaen Joseph (1842–1935) and Albrecht François Lieven (1843–1900))
- Louis Dewis (born in Mons, 1872 – died in Biarritz 1946) – Post-Impressionism
- August De Wilde (born in Lokeren, 1819 – died in Sint-Niklaas 1886) – portrait and genre painter
- Sam Dillemans (born in Leuven 1965) – Contemporary
- Christian Dotremont (born in Tervuren, 1922 – died in Buizingen, 1979) – Avant-garde
- Arpaïs Du Bois (born in Ghent 1973) – Contemporary

== E ==
- James Ensor (born in Ostend, 1860 – died in Ostend, 1949) – painter and printmaker
- Henri Evenepoel (born in Nice, 1872 – died in Paris, 1899) – fauvism

== F ==
- Émile Fabry (born in Verviers, 1865 – died in Woluwe-Saint-Pierre, 1966) – Symbolism
- Jean-Michel Folon (born in Uccle 1934 – died in Monaco 2005)
- Théodore Fourmois (1814–1871) – landscape painter and printmaker
- Pol Fraiture (1946–1981) – oil paintings and monotypes
- Lucien Frank (born in Brussels 1857 – died in Ohain 1920) – landscape painter, Impressionism
- Alice Frey (born in Antwerp, 1895 – died in Ostend, 1981) – Expressionism

== G ==
- Louis Gallait (born in Tournai, 1810 – died in Schaerbeek, 1887)
- Jane Graverol (born in Ixelles, 1905 – died in Fontainebleau, 1984) – Surrealism

== H ==
- Philip Henderickx (born 1976) – Contemporary
- Hugo Heyrman (born in Antwerp, 1942) – Contemporary

== J ==
- Floris Jespers (1889–1965) – Avant-garde

== K ==
- Fernand Khnopff (born in Grembergen, 1858 – died in Brussels, 1921) – Symbolism

== L ==
- Paul Lauters (1806–1875) – Abstraction, Tachisme, École de Paris
- Georges Emile Lebacq (born in Jemappes, 1876 – died in Bruges, 1950) – Impressionism, Post-Impressionism
- Mercédès Legrand (1893–1945), Spanish-born Belgian painter, sculptor, poet
- Charles Leickert (born in Brussels, 1816 – died in Mainz, 1907) – Winter scenes
- Georges Lemmen (1865–1916) – Neo-Impressionism
- Auguste Levêque (born in Nivelles, 1866 – died in Saint-Josse-ten-Noode, 1921) – painter influenced both by Realism and Symbolism
- Jan August Hendrik Leys (born in Antwerp, 1815 – died in Antwerp, 1869) – Romance

== M ==
- Jean Baptiste Madou (born in Brussels, 1796 – died in Saint-Josse-ten-Noode, 1877) – painter and lithographer
- Karel Maes (born in Mol, Belgium, 1900 – died in Brussels, 1974) – abstract art
- René Magritte (born in Lessines, 1898 – died in Brussels, 1967) – Surrealism
- Auguste Mambour (born in Liège, 1896 – died in Liège, 1968) – Expressionism, Cubism, African art
- Frans Masereel (born in Blankenberge, 1889 – died in Avignon, France, 1972) – painter and woodcutter
- Armand Massonet (1892–1979)
- Constantin Meunier (born Etterbeek, 1831 – died in Brussels, 1905) – painter and sculptor
- Henri Michaux (1899–1984) – painter, poet and writer
- Constant Montald (born in Ghent, 1862 – died in Brussels, 1944)
- Tony Mafia (1931–1999), American-Belgian painter, sculptor, and singer-songwriter

== N ==
- François-Joseph Navez (born in Charleroi, 1787 – died in Brussels, 1869) – Neo-classicism
- Xavier Noiret-Thomé (born in 1971) – Contemporary
- Cristina Funes-Noppen – Contemporary

== O ==
- Jacques Ochs (born in Nice, 1883 – died in Liège, 1971) – Illustrator, Caricaturist
- Christian Otte (born in Theux, 1943 – died in Liège, 2005)

== P ==
- Pierre Paulus (born in Châtelet, 1881 – died in Brussels, 1959) – Expressionism
- Constant Permeke (born in Antwerp, 1886 – died in Ostend, 1952) – Expressionism
- Erik Pevernagie (born 1939) – Contemporary
- Louis Pevernagie (1904–1970) – Expressionism
- Jean-François Portaels (born in Vilvoorde, 1818 – died in Schaerbeek, 1895)

== R ==
- Armand Rassenfosse (born in Liège, 1862 – died in Liège, 1934) – Symbolism, Art nouveau
- Reniere & Depla (born in Poperinge, 1956 and born in Ostend, 1954)
- Roger Raveel (Machelen-aan-de-Leie, 1921–2013) – painter especially of pop art
- Gaston Relens (1909 – 2011)
- Félicien Rops (born in Namur, 1833 – died in Essonne, France, 1898) – artist, and printmaker in etching and aquatint

== S ==
- Albert Servaes (1883–1966) – Expressionism
- Victor Servranckx (born in Diegem, 1897 – Elewijt, 1965) – Cubism
- Leon Spilliaert (born in Ostend, 1881 – died in Ostend, 1946) – Symbolism, Expressionism
- Alfred Stevens (born in Brussels, 1828 – died in Paris, France, 1906)
- Alexander Struys (born in Berchem, 1852 – died in Uccle, 1941)

== T ==
- Jan Theuninck (born in Zonnebeke, 1954) – Contemporary painter and poet
- Albert Thys (born in Kontich, 1894 – died in 1976) – portraiture, landscapes
- Luc Tuymans (born in Mortsel, 1958) – Contemporary
- Edgard Tytgat (born in Brussels, 1879 – died in Woluwe-Saint-Lambert, 1957) – Fauvism

== U ==
- Raoul Ubac (born in Malmedy or Cologne, 1910 – died in Dieudonné, Oise, 1985)

== V ==
- Hilaire Vanbiervliet (born in Courtray, 1890 – died 1981) – Expressionism
- Jef Van Campen (born in Antwerp, 1934) – Expressionism
- Frans Van Damme (born in Hamme, 1858 – died in Brussels, 1925) – Impressionism, Realism
- Hans Vandekerckhove (born in Kortrijk, 1957) – Contemporary
- Philippe Vandenberg (born in Ghent, 1952 – died in Brussels, 2009)
- Frits Van den Berghe (born in Ghent, 1883 – died in Ghent, 1939) – Expressionism
- Louis Van den Eynde (born in Anderlecht, 1881 – died in 1966) – portrait and genre painter
- Jef Van der Veken (born in Antwerp, 1872 – died in Ixelles, 1964) – copyist and art restorer
- Henry van de Velde (born in Antwerp, 1863 – died in Zürich, Switzerland, 1957) – Art Nouveau
- Gustave Van de Woestijne (born in Ghent, 1891 – died in Brussels, 1947)
- Albert Van Dyck (born in Turnhout, 1902 – died in Antwerp, 1951) – portrait and genre painter
- Peter Van Gheluwe (born in Ghent, 1957) – Contemporary
- Anne-Mie Van Kerckhoven (born in Antwerp, 1951) – Contemporary
- Cornelius Van Leemputten (1841–1902) – painter especially of landscapes with sheep
- Louis Van Lint (born in Brussels, 1909 – died in Brussels, 1986) – Abstract Expressionism
- Koen Vanmechelen (born in Sint-Truiden, 1965) – Contemporary
- Eugeen Van Mieghem (born in Antwerp, 1875 – died in Antwerp, 1930) – Impressionism
- Jan Vanriet (born in Antwerp, 1958) – Contemporary
- Théo van Rysselberghe (born in Ghent, 1862 – died in Saint-Clair, Var, France, 1926) – Pointillism
- Eugène Joseph Verboeckhoven (1790–1881) – animal painter
- Jan Verdoodt – Magic realism; follower of Magritte
- Fernand Verhaegen (born in Marchienne-au-Pont (Charleroi), 1883 – died in Montigny-le-Tilleul, 1975) – painter and etcher
- Frans Verhas (born in Dendermonde, 1827 – died in Schaerbeek, 1897) – portrait and genre painter
- Jan Verhas (born in Dendermonde, 1834 – died in Schaerbeek, 1896) – portrait and genre painter
- Charles Verlat (born in Antwerp, 1824 – died in Antwerp, 1890) – painter and etcher

== W ==
- Baron Gustaf Wappers (born in Antwerp, 1803 – died in Paris, France, 1874) – Romanticism
- Camille Wauters (born in Temse, 1856 – died in Lokeren, 1919) – Landscape painting
- Charles Augustin Wauters (born in Boom, 1808 – died in Mechelen, 1869) – Religious subjects and genre scenes
- Emile Wauters (1846–1933) – history painter and portraitist
- Ernest Welvaert (born in Lokeren, 1880 – died in Uccle, 1946)
- Antoine Joseph Wiertz (born in Dinant, 1806 – died in Brussels, 1865) – Romanticism
- Florent Joseph Marie Willems (1823–1905) – genre painter
- Roger Wittevrongel (born in Blankenberge, 1933) – Contemporary
- Rik Wouters (1882–1916) – Fauvism
- Cindy Wright (born 1972)
- Juliette Wytsman (1866–1925)
- Rodolphe Wytsman (1860–1927)
- Peter Weidenbaum (born in Antwerp, 1968) – Contemporary

== See also ==
- Art of Belgium
