= Pierre Abattucci =

Belgian artist (1871–1942)

- Pierre-Jean Abattucci
- Born: May 20, 1871; Molenbeek-Saint-Jean
- Died: December 20, 1942 (aged 71); Ixelles
- Occupations: painter, visual artist

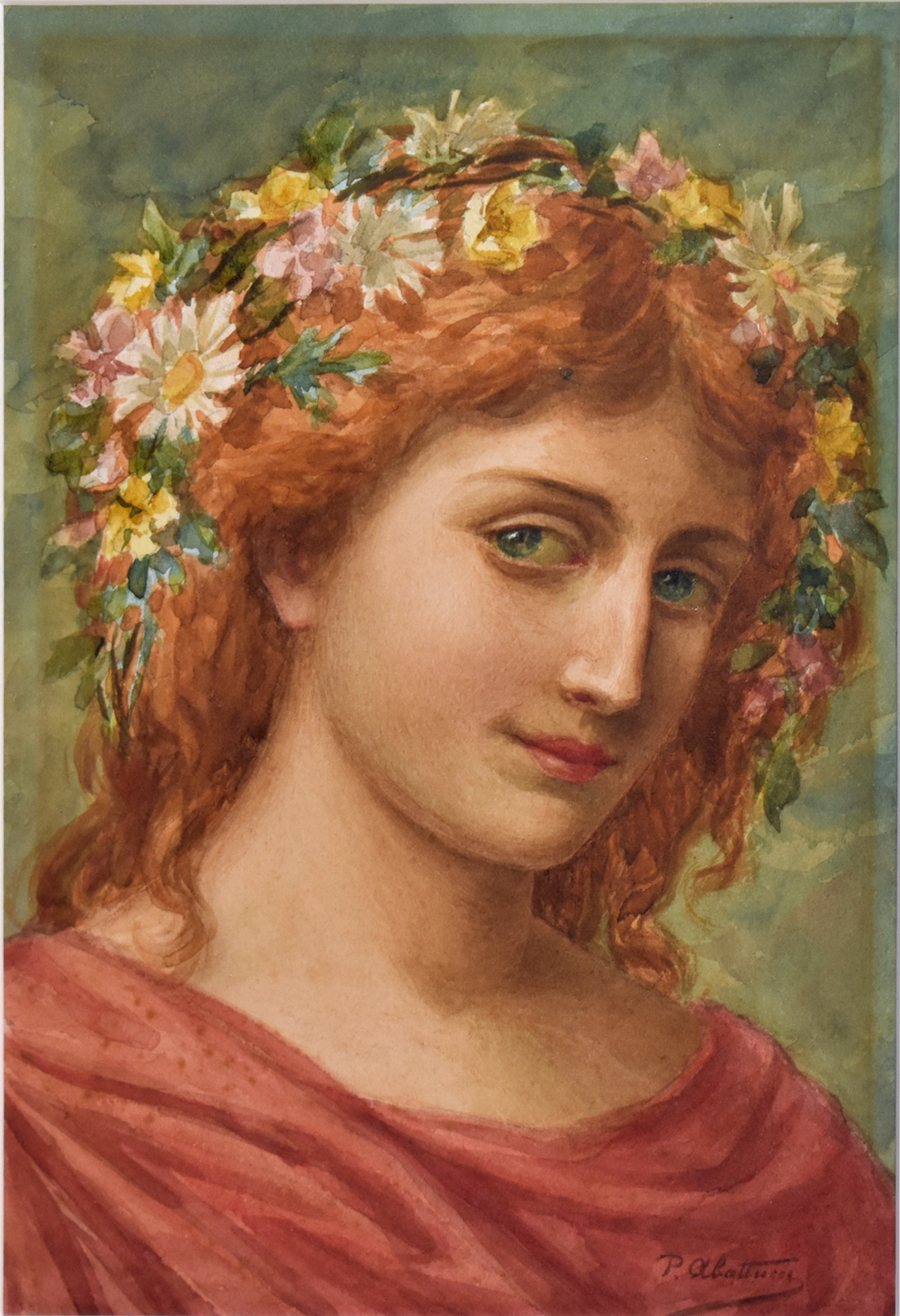
Portrait by Pierre Abattucci

Pierre-Jean Abattucci (May 20, 1871, Molenbeek-Saint-Jean – December 20, 1942, Ixelles) was a Belgian painter and graphic artist and lithographer, especially of landscapes closely related to the spirit of Symbolism.

== Biography ==
Abattucci was born as the son of Jacques Abattucci and Petronille Senders and was married to Catherine Louise de Mesmaeker.

He received his artistic training at the École des Arts Décoratifs in Molenbeek-Saint-Jean with François Stroobant, then at the Academy of Fine Arts in Brussels from 1892 to 1897, where he studied from Jean-François Portaels, Charles Van der Stappen and Joseph Stallaert as most important teachers.

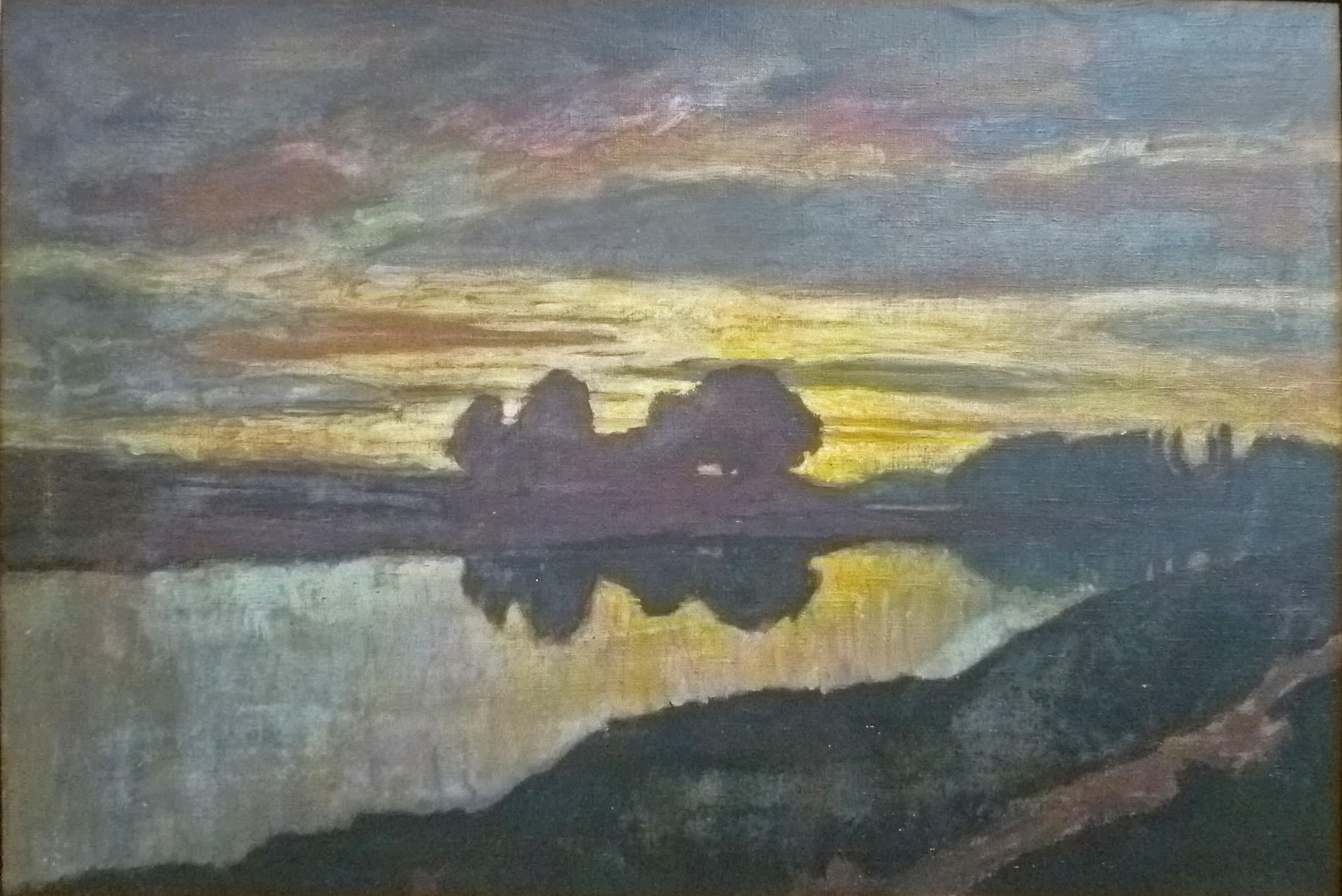
Landschap (1921)

Abattucci debuted as an artist in a salon of the L'Art Libre and was a regular exhibitor throughout his life in the Brussels salons of the Société Royale des Beaux-Arts and of the Cercle Artistique et Littéraire. In the “Cercle”, located in the Waux-Hall on the Rue de la Loi/Wetstraat, he exhibited individually in 1921 and 1935. In 1912, he had exhibition together with Emile Jacques and in 1924 he exhibited there in a wider context together with Eric Wansart, Pros De Wit, Jenny Montigny and Henriëte Bossché. He also had personal exhibitions in the galleries Toison d'Or and Studio (1922). He was also represented in the Studio during the 1920 Autumn Salon where he exhibited with colleagues such as Firmin Baes, Henri Binard, Louis Buisseret, Hubert Glansdorff and Gustave-Max Stevens.

== Museums and public collections ==
- Verz. Belgische Staat
- Brussels, Royal Collection
- Brussels, Charlier Museum: “View of Rapallo”
- Ixelles, Municipal Museum: “Evening at the edge of the pond”
- Mons, Musée des Beaux-Arts: “End of the day – Sorrento”
- Ostend, KaZ: lithograph “La plaine”
