= Weizenbaum =

Weizenbaum is a Jewish German surname. 'Weizen' means (buck)wheat, 'baum' is a tree. Notable people with the surname include:

- Joseph Weizenbaum (1923–2008), German-American computer scientist
- Zoe Weizenbaum (born 1991), American actress

== See also ==
- Weidenbaum
