= Luc-Peter Crombé =

Belgian painter (1920–2005)

- Born: 14 January 1920; Opwijk, Belgium
- Died: 17 May 2005 (aged 85); Sint-Martens-Latem, Belgium
- Resting place: Deurle, Belgium
- Known for: Religious work, tempera technique, female figures
- Movement: 4th Latem School of Flemish Art
- Website: Official website Luc-Peter Crombé

Luc-Peter Crombé (14 January 1920 – 17 May 2005) was a Belgian, Flemish painter.

Luc-Peter Crombé was painter of landscapes, portraits, figures and religious subjects. He was part of the so-called 4th School of Latem of Flemish art and was known for his use of the tempera technique, his religious art but also for the wide variety of styles that he helped develop and explore.

== Early life ==
Luc-Peter Crombé was born in Opwijk, a small Flemish city northwest of Brussels. He studied at the Royal Academy of Fine Arts of Ghent and the Sint-Lucas Academie in Ghent, as well as at the Royal Academy of Fine Arts in Antwerp. He was a student of Jos Verdegem and Constant Permeke. Crombé studied art history in the École du Louvre in Paris and also spent time in the mid 1940s at the influential Académie de la Grande Chaumière where he learned how to draw the female body.

== Style and technique ==
The earliest works by Luc-Peter Crombé are in a more intimate and decorative style, in which he relies on traditional images from every day Flemish life. From the 1950s onwards, the influences from the South became apparent, beginning with the use of tempera technique and in particular in the area of the interplay between colour and light. The figure also gets its place as the main motif (a child's world, portraits and background characters), pastel and charcoal drawings. At the end of the 1950s, his travels to Corsica where his art focus on the origin and erosion of rocks. He begins to experiment with abstract art. This period, which runs until around 1965, is therefore considered to be his first period with his Corsica series, Italy, Morocco and Spanish series.

The religious art of Luc-Peter Crombé in the late 1950s and early 1960s culminates with the painting of his famous Way of the Cross hangs in the Mariahal next to the Basilica of Our Lady of Scherpenheuvel.

At the end of the 1960s and early 1970s, Luc-Peter Crombé had two work-studios: in addition to the Sint-Martens-Latem studio, he also had another studio in Maaseik. The smooth brush strokes dominate from that moment. During this period, he mainly produces pastel and charcoal drawings. The Latem period is characterized by the following successive series:

- 'Tribute to life' where movement plays an important role. The movement in dance and theatrical life are very important and dominant subjects. This reflects a move away from religious art in its purest form to embrace a celebration of life and cultivate a sense of belonging to a community, with close ties and traditions. The line of movement plays an important role. Dance, theater and carnival are important themes in the suite 'ode to life'. Special influences in this discovery phase are Maurice Béjart and Jeanne Brabants, contacts with the operas in Paris and London.
- The 'Lutander'-series: 2000 years of history, here the artist makes one think about very contemporary themes. Man and his beast and his god; his angel and his devil, his selfishness and need, his desire for renewal and self-affirmation, his life through destruction and his destruction through multiplication. These are all themes which reflect inner struggles, coming terms with the past, embracing new identities and new power relationships in a society that is changing at an almost breathless pace. Power, greed for money, environment, people are destroying themselves. His quest for new things, for renewal, but mainly the fact that through the way of life one destroys oneself.
- 'Petruliër'-series or the individual awareness which follows the Enlightenment: a series of paintings that translate themes from antiquity into the modern context. The male-female relationship is presented as an unstable relationship in contrast with the more traditional relationships of the past. Gender relations are depicted as power relations as part of a coercive hierarchy. The paintings depict a more enlightened vision of the woman, moving away from powerless innocent figures (quiet, obedient, accommodating) to more powerful figures.
- 'Decorith'-series is an indictment of the power struggle of the emancipation movement, which is interwoven throughout this series. Gender roles which tend to perpetuate the power inequalities that they are based on are transformed in this series. Gender shapes how the artist understands the concept of power relationships, and his works represent the struggle to supplant hierarchical and traditional power relationships which he inherently sees as reflecting a male bias.
- "Licrobert-Hil-Climi" suite, from emancipation to liberation; his work displays a degree of individualism in women, centered on the ability of women to demonstrate and maintain their equality through their own actions and choices.

In addition to the tempera technique, fresco was his favourite technique. Many subjects such as the lace workers, landscapes, animals and intimate subjects were developed using this technique.

In his final period, Luc-Peter Crombé would work through the drawings that had remained in the studio with very surprising results. The backgrounds are often reduced to a game of surfaces. The stark contrast of figuration and background gives the works a more sensitive touch. Colour contrasts seem to harmoniously mix with a common colouring. The continued prominence of the female figure begins to change, based on the premise that with sexual liberation, the woman first becomes more conscious of the ways one's gender identity and sexuality have been shaped by society and then intentionally constructing (and becoming free to express) one's authentic gender identity and sexuality.

== Awards and prizes ==
He was awarded the following prizes: Prize for live model, 1947, Antwerp Provincial prize, 1954, East Flanders Prize for graphics, 1955, Frankfurt; Benevenuto prize, 1956, Milan; Sagrada family prize for religious art, 1957, Barcelona; Distinguished Award at World's Fair, 1964, New York; New York city prize, 1964, New York; Honorary prize, 1965, Detroit; Culture Prize, Opwijk 2020 (post-humous)

== Death ==
Luc-Peter Crombé died in 2005 and is buried in Deurle alongside other well-known artists from Sint-Martens-Latem late 19th and 20th century artistic community such as Gustave De Smet, Léon De Smet, Xavier Decock, Jenny Montigny and Albert Claeys.

== See also ==
- List of Belgian painters
