= Jef Van Campen =

Belgian post-impressionistic art painter (born 1934)

- Born: 6 February 1934 (age 92); Antwerp Belgium
- Known for: Painting

Jef Van Campen (born 6 February 1934) is a Belgian post-impressionistic painter. He is mostly known for his maritime paintings, impressions of rivers, sea and of ships in Antwerp harbour. His work also contains portraits and still life.

== Personalia ==
- Father: Constant Van Campen, art painter, repaired objects of art
- Mother: Housewife, mother of 5, 2 daughters, 3 sons (Jef was the oldest son)
- Married Isabelle van Thillo, 4 children, 3 girls and a boy

== Biography ==
- Born 6 February 1934 in Antwerp
- At the age of 13, accepted to the eveningclasses of the Royal Academy of Fine Arts Antwerp
- Completed secondary school at two colleges, St-Louis and St-Norbert in Antwerp
- Attended the famous Artistic Crafts School in the Londenstraat in Antwerp
- Completed military service
- Attended at the Academies of Berchem and Schoten
- Professional art painter since 1990.
- Working and living in Antwerp

=== Recognitions ===
- 1976 : Selected for award for aquarel Lions Club Antwerp
- 1977 : Selected for award for art painter of the city Ronse
- 1978 : Selected for award 'Eugène Schmidt'- Anderlecht
- 1982 : Public prize aquarel – Lions Club Antwerp
- 1983 : 2nd Prize for aquarel – Lions Club Antwerp
- 1983 : Honorable mention – Lions Club Voorkempen
- 1985 : 1st Prize for aquarel – Lions Club Voorkempen
- 1986 : 1st Prize kunstwedstrijd – Antwerpen een wereld van transport – Willemsfonds
- 1986 : 1st prize in Novotel Antwerp North
- 1987 : Public Prize – aquarelcontest Lions Club Voorkempen

== See also ==
Dutch wiki Article about Jef Van Campen
