= Hilaire Vanbiervliet =

Belgian painter

Hilaire Vanbiervliet (29 October 1890–1981) was a Belgian painter belonging to the Flemish expressionists. Vanbiervliet was born in Courtray. He lived in Flanders as well as in Normandy. He painted landscapes, and rural and religious scenes. In 1973, Vanbiervliet's oeuvre was awarded the Gold Medal for "Arts, Sciences and Literature" of the Académie française. The prize was handed over by the French playwright Marcel Achard who had presided over the commission.
