= Philip Henderickx =

Belgian painter, photographer (born 1976)

Philip Henderickx (born 11 April 1976) is a Belgian contemporary artist (painter, photographer).

Henderickx was born in Burkina Faso and spent his childhood in Burkina Faso, Togo and Ethiopia.

He studied in the academy of fine arts in Ghent and Sint Lucas in Brussels. After his studies in 1998 he left Belgium to work and live for 10 years in Asia.

Henderickx's work is figurative and makes extensive use of techniques from photography. His palette usually tends toward monochrome and shades of grey. Subjects of his paintings are his childhood relation to Africa, his Catholic education and his new home Belgium.

Henderickx lives and works in Leuven.

== See also ==
- List of Belgian painters
