= Jan Verdoodt =

Jan Verdoodt (1908–1980) came from Sint-Pieters-Jette in Belgium. He attended the Academy of Molenbeek-Saint-Jean from 1926, under Frans Persoons, where he was attracted equally by Realism (in the work of Eugène Laermans) and Surrealism (in Magritte's paintings). He developed his own style by combining these two schools, creating 'a kind of magic realism in which dream and reality, woman and nature, were intimately bound together'.

== Career ==
He began work as an apprentice in a lithography studio and became a photo-engraver. He produced portraits, self-portraits, still life paintings and landscapes, and was a founding member of the Cercle Jecta in 1938 (Magritte was also a member).

His work has been acquired by the Belgian state and by the province of Brabant, and he has given his name to a road in Jette and to a path in the Parc Baudouin.

== See also ==
- List of Belgian painters
- Magic Realism
- Surrealism
