= Weidenbaum =

Weidenbaum is a surname. Notable people with the surname include:

- Marc Weidenbaum (born 1966), American editor
- Murray Weidenbaum (1927–2014), American economist
- Peter Weidenbaum (born 1968), Belgian artist
