= Cristina Funes-Noppen =

- Born: Como, Italy
- Education: Georgetown University; Université libre de Bruxelles; Jamia Millia College
- Occupations: Diplomat; Artist; Writer
- Website: www.info-cristinafunesnoppen.com

Cristina Funes-Noppen is a Belgian diplomat, artist, and writer.

== Early life and education ==
Cristina Funes-Noppen, born in Como, Italy. Her father, Hermann Noppen, was a diplomat and her mother, Maria Noppen De Matteis, was an artist.

Funes-Noppen attended Georgetown University from 1964 to 1966, where she studied interpretation and foreign management. Later, she studied Indian culture in 1967 at Jamia Millia College in New Delhi. She also studied political and diplomatic sciences between 1967 and 1971 at the Université libre de Bruxelles. She wrote her thesis on the Mau Mau movement with Professor Kipkorir of the University of Nairobi.

== Career ==
Funes-Noppen began her career as attaché in Rome when she joined the Kingdom of Belgium's Foreign Service in February 1973. A year later, she was appointed vice-consul in Amsterdam.

From 1975 to 1978, she served as Belgium's Deputy Representative at UNESCO.

Between 1978 and 1982, Funes-Noppen was appointed as the First Secretary in New Delhi.

In 1982, Funes-Noppen moved to Geneva, where she served as the First Secretary for the Permanent Representation to the United Nations in Geneva until 1985. In 1982, she delivered an address to the United Nations Human Rights Commission in Geneva, condemning female genital mutilation in Africa.

In 1985, she was appointed Ambassador of Belgium to Zambia, a position she held until 1987.

In 1988, Funes-Noppen took on the role of Ambassador of Belgium in Nairobi, Kenya, and Permanent Representative to the United Nations in Nairobi, serving until 1991. At the very end of 1990, she negotiated the release of two hostage MSF doctors of Belgian and Dutch nationality held by the South Sudan Liberation Army.

In 1991, she returned to New Delhi, assuming the role of Ambassador of Belgium to India, which she held until 1995.

In 1995, Funes-Noppen returned to Brussels, where she worked with the Ministry of Foreign Affairs on the United Nations, Human Rights, and Disarmament desks for two years.

From 1997 to 2000, she served as the ambassador of Belgium to Thailand.

Between 2000 and 2002, Funes-Noppen worked as a Special Commissioner for Development Cooperation. From 2002 to 2005, she was the Ambassador of Belgium to Morocco.

From 2005 to 2007, she served as both the Belgian Ambassador to Nairobi and the Permanent Representative to the UN in Nairobi. During this period, she also became a member of the International Advisory Committee on Somalia.

From September 2007 to January 2009, Funes-Noppen served as the Ambassador of Belgium to Austria. During the same period, she also served as Belgium's Permanent Representative to the United Nations in Vienna.

In 2009, Funes-Noppen was appointed as the Ambassador of Belgium to Argentina, serving until 2011.

After her retirement in 2011, Funes-Noppen now works as an artist and writer and has exhibited her artwork in multiple galleries.

== Bibliography ==
- Des hommes, des femmes et des bêtes tome I, Éditions Persee, 2011
- Des hommes, des femmes et des bêtes tome II, Éditions Persee, 2012
- Amours interdits du temps passé monographie des œuvres de Marie Noppen de Matteis, Éditions Artcadia, 2015
- Bien vivre, remèdes naturels, astuces et recettes du monde entier, Éditions Persee, 2016
- Un théâtre d'ombres et autres nouvelles, Préface du Lama Matthieu Ricard
- Hélène et son T-shirt vert pomme, Éditions Persee, 2019
- Chroniques impertinentes préface de S.S. le Dalai Lama, 180°éditions, 2021
- Le bourreau de Nauplie, 180°éditions, 2022
- A la recherche de Kamala" éditions Le Lys Bleu, 2023
- Ils étaient six préface du prof. Mark Eyskens ministre d'Etat éditions Il est Midi, 2024
- Équivoques recueil de nouvelles préface du vicomte Yves de Jonghe d’Ardoye éditions Il est Midi, 2025
