= Jan Theuninck =

Belgian painter and poet (born 1954)

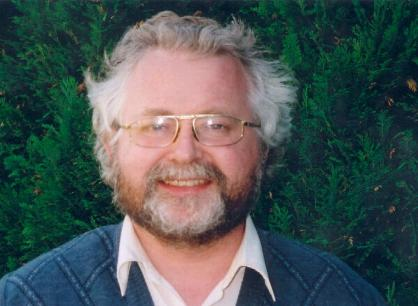
- Jan Theuninck
- Born: 7 June 1954 (age 71); Zonnebeke, Belgium
- Occupations: Painter, poet

Jan Theuninck (born 7 June 1954) is a Belgian painter and poet. Although born in Zonnebeke, Belgium, and a native speaker of Dutch, he writes in French and occasionally English. His painting is abstract, falling somewhere between minimalism and monochrome expressionism.

As a painter, he has been influenced by Ellsworth Kelly and Joan Miró. His work in both media is guided by his social and political convictions, dealing with topics such as colonialism old and new, mass and society, and pacifism.
