= Piet Bekaert =

Belgian painter

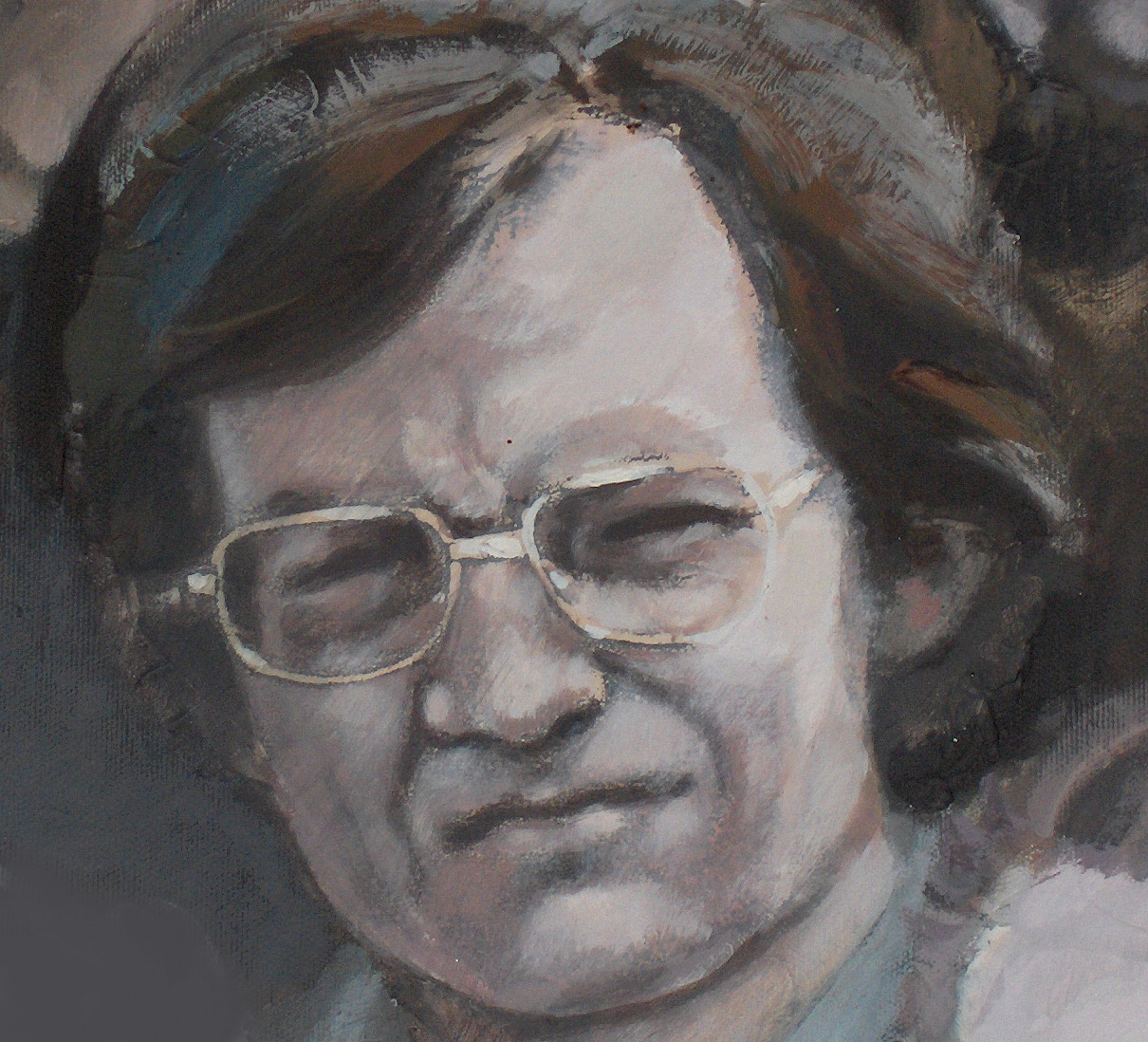
- Self portrait
- Born: Piet Bekaert; 8 May 1939; Vichte, Belgium
- Died: 7 July 2000 (aged 61); Deurle, Belgium
- Education: Royal Academy of Fine Arts of Ghent; Royal Academy of Fine Arts of Brussels
- Occupation: Painter
- Movement: Impressionism

Piet Bekaert (8 May 1939 – 7 July 2000) was a Belgian painter. Influenced by the Impressionists, he is known for his characteristic subdued lighting style and garden and indoor scenes.
