= Christian Otte =

Belgian painter (1943–2005)

Otte in 1997

Christian Otte (30 September 1943 in Theux – September 12, 2005 in Liège) was a Belgian painter.
