= Pol Fraiture =

Belgian painter

Pol Fraiture (17 December 1946 – 8 November 1981) was a Belgian painter noted for his very personal technique and famous for his oil paintings and his monotypes. He was recognized by Belgian and international critics and by many collectors since his debut. He painted between seven and eight hundred art pieces.

== Biography ==
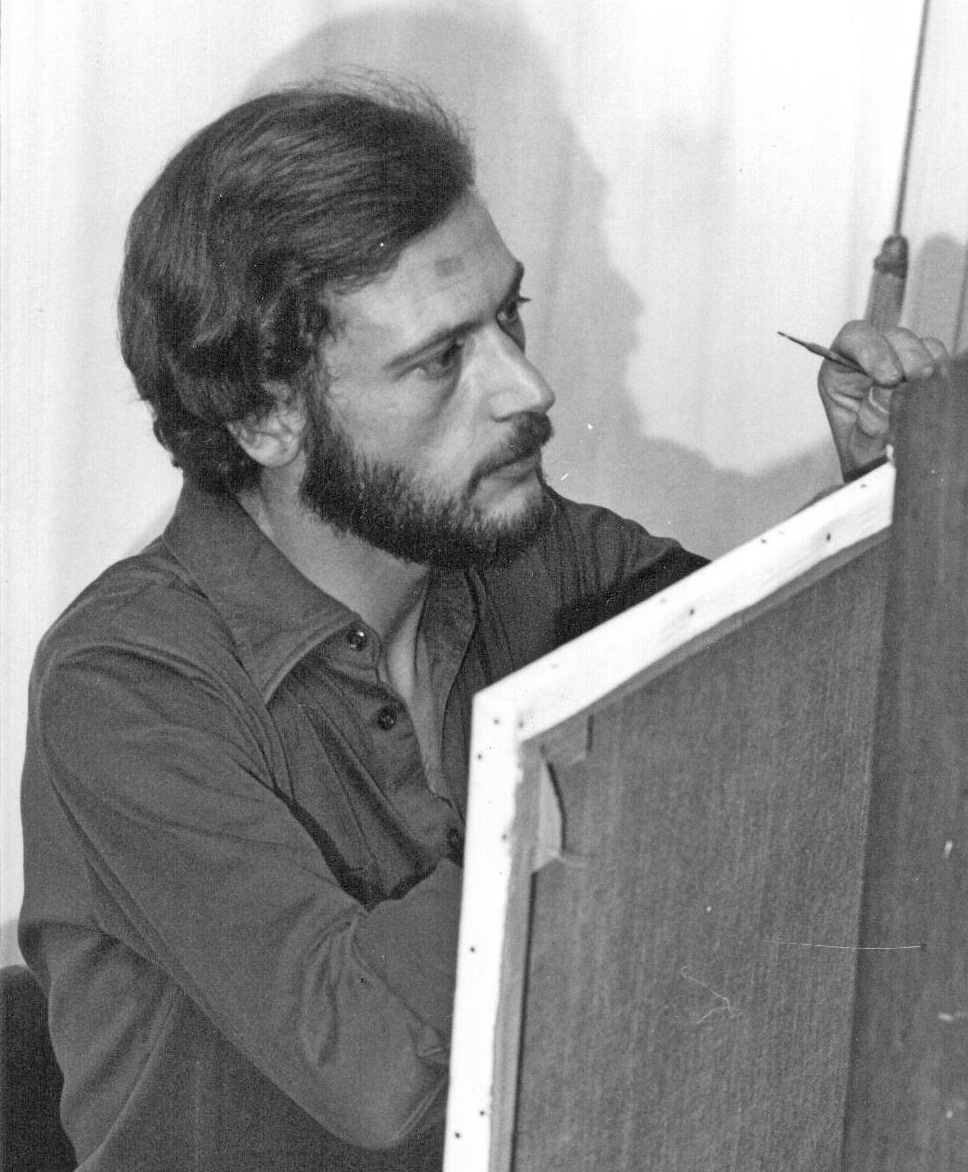

Pol Fraiture was born on 17 December 1946 in Ixelles, Brussels, Belgium. He began painting when he was child. From the age of thirteen, he won several art competitions. He studied at the "Académie royale des Beaux-Arts de Bruxelles" (great distinction in drawing and graphic arts) and at the "Beaux-Arts de Paris" (‘‘Fine Arts, Paris’’) (decorative arts, art history). In 1975 he took part in "Art pour Tous" in Brussels and was awarded one Golden Medal (Jury Award) and two Silver Medals (Press and Public Awards). He exhibited for the first time in an art gallery of Namur (Belgium) at the age of nineteen, and then regularly in Brussels, Antwerp, Knokke, Paris, Geneva, Amsterdam, Nassau, and the United States. Most of Fraiture’s works are oils on canvas. His monotypes usually show another, more tormented, side of his personality.

In his early paintings, he builds up compositions in fingertip-size stabs or thick scrawls, etching in outlines with delicacy, the subject, almost invisible at first in the overall impression of colour, emerging slowly. In his later paintings, he ‘engraves’ the subject in fresh colour. They reveal a harmonious blending of shades and nuances. His works represent an exploratory journey. The spectator discovers them, gradually apprehending, on closer examination, the original vision of the artist, which captivates with the vibrant harmony of its colours.

His oils on canvas show his love of nature.

Luminist, colorist, both abstract and figurative, Fraiture’s work is not part of any art movement. He created his own style, his own personal technique. His major work is "Bruxelles intemporelle". It is part of a set of works entitled "One-way journey". The concepts of the future, space and timelessness fascinate him.

== Reception ==
André Malraux wrote of him:

"A young, very human face, an exuberant, even overflowing vitality; instinctive and reasonable, enthusiastic and thoughtful, earthy and celestial, feeling the need to radiate a generous goodness and affirm his personality in the direction of aesthetic, spiritual and moral efforts. These are some of the characteristics of Pol Fraiture. His work shows a striking resemblance to his personality. It is directed towards the infinite; each touch of colour is a step towards the glow of the superconscious and the caverns of the infraconscious, mixed nevertheless with a desire to link near and far with vigorous, frank graphics. His vibrant, sometimes daring colours smoothed on the canvas with delicacy and subtlety offer the eye a very special iridescent brilliance, sometimes expressing serenity, sometimes fear, but always purity. Pol Fraiture can offer so much: greatness, excitement, energy, reality and finally, beauty…" (1972)

In 1978, he married Claudette De Ville, who has been organizing retrospective exhibitions of his work since 1985. In 2012, she published a monograph about his life through his work (Pol Fraiture - Histoire de ma Vie avec Pol / Pol Fraiture – My Life with Pol)

In 2011, his work entered the Centre de la Gravure et de l’Image imprimée (Center of Engraving and Printed Image) collection (La Louvière, Belgium)

Pol Fraiture died in Uccle, Brussels, on 8 November 1981.
