= Fritz de Brouckère =

Belgian painter

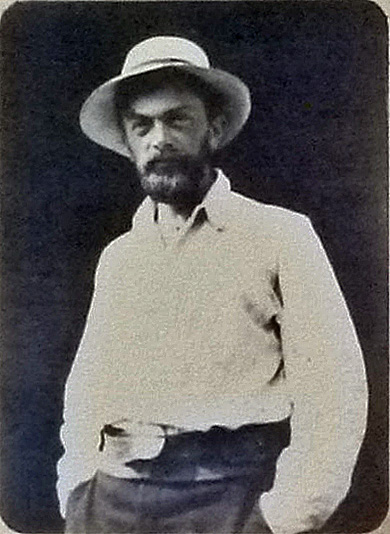
- Born: 1879; Belgium
- Died: 1928 (aged 48–49); Brussels, Belgium
- Known for: Painting, drawing
- Movement: Impressionism, Symbolism
- Spouse: Arienne de Brouckère

Fritz de Brouckère is a Belgian painter from the late nineteenth and early twentieth century. His work was mostly focused on rural landscapes of the Belgian coast.

Fritz de Brouckère can be ranked amongst the Belgian impressionists. Symbolism is very present in his paintings. Another characteristic is the frequent representation of his two daughters.

== Biography ==
Fritz the Brouckère was born in 1879. The de Brouckère family moved from Brussels to the Belgian coast at Knokke where they continued living in a very big house that later became a hospital. The house they built was called the Bremhuis.

In 1923 Fritz de Brouckère got sick. The family moved back to Brussels. There he died in 1928 at the age of 49.

=== de Brouckère Family ===
Fritz de Brouckère is related to Lucia de Brouckère, a Belgian chemist, and Louis de Brouckère, a politician.

== Exhibitions ==
The painter never wanted to exhibit his paintings and no exhibition of his work was made while he was alive. In between October 20, 2012, and January 13, 2013, an exhibition assembled paintings of about 300 Belgian painters. Some works of Fritz de Brouckère were temporarily shown to the public.

=== His work ===
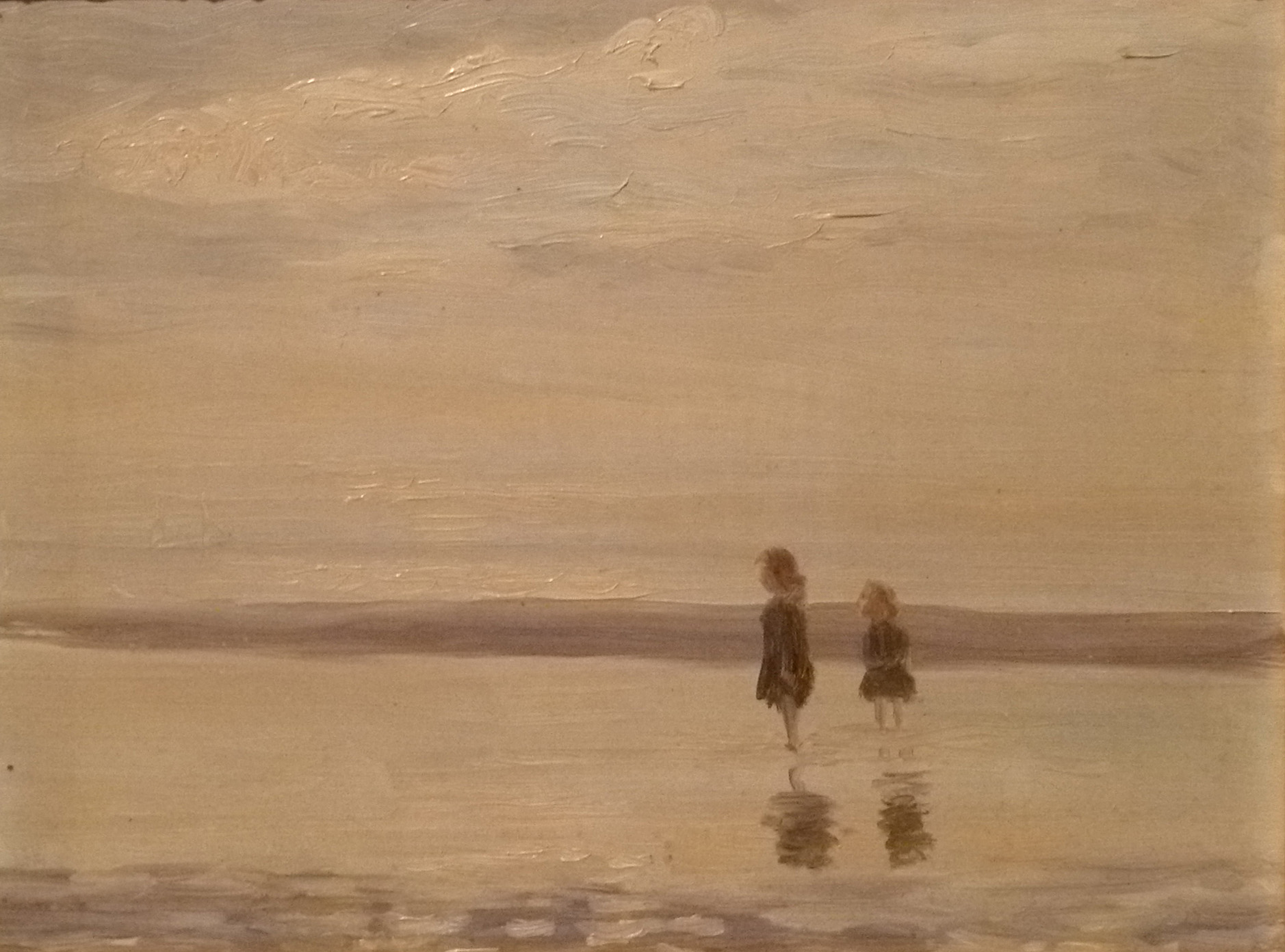
Two girls on the beach

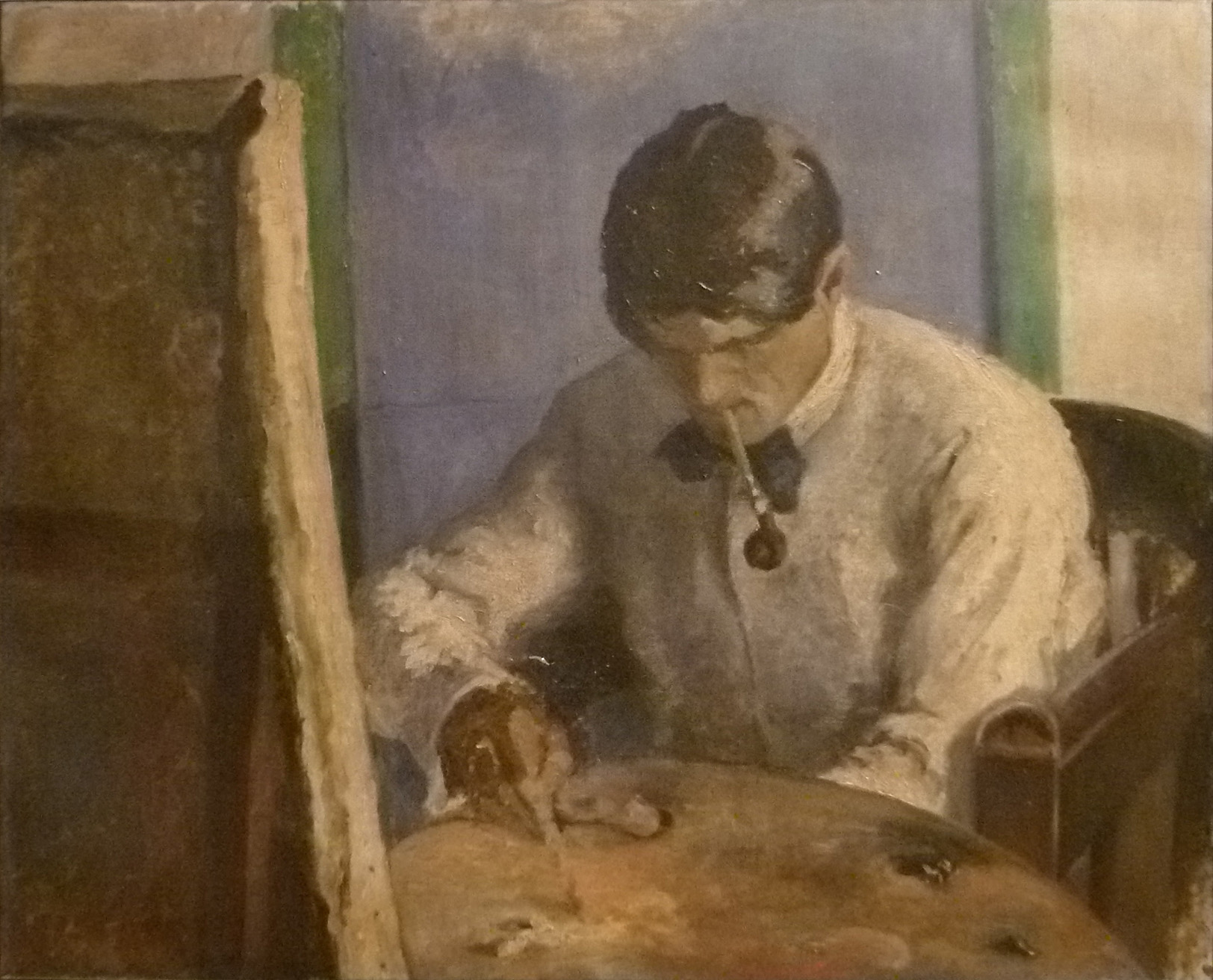
Portrait of Jean Parmentier, private collection

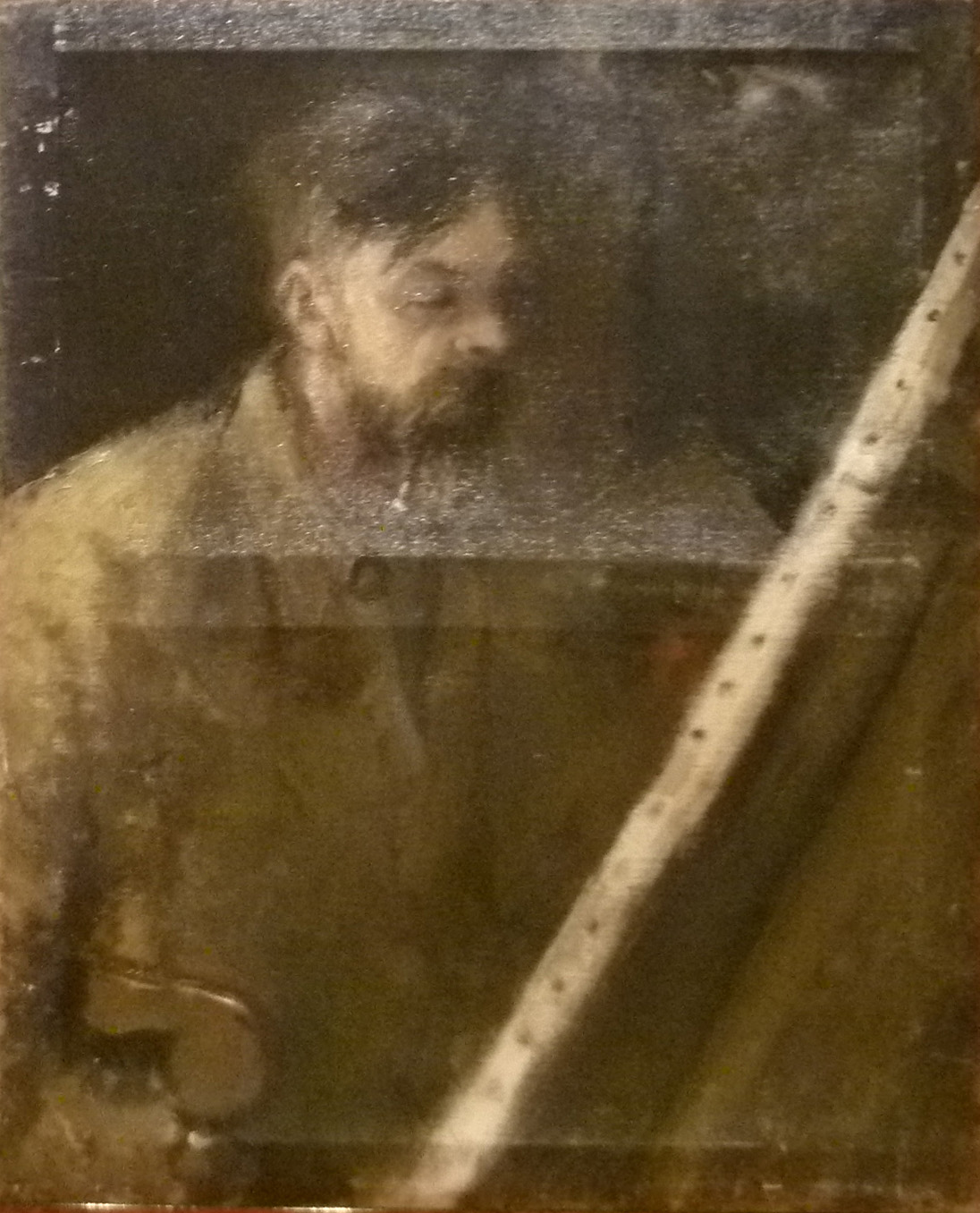
Self portrait, 80x66cm, private collection

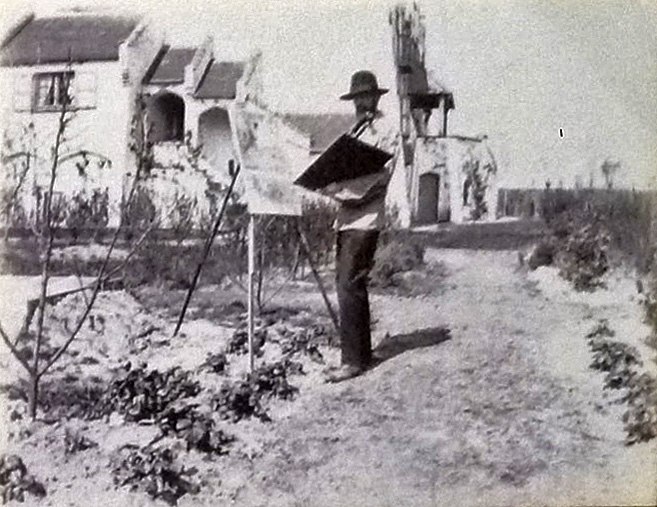
Fritz de Brouckère painting in front of the Bremhuis
