= Philippe Vandenberg =

Belgian painter

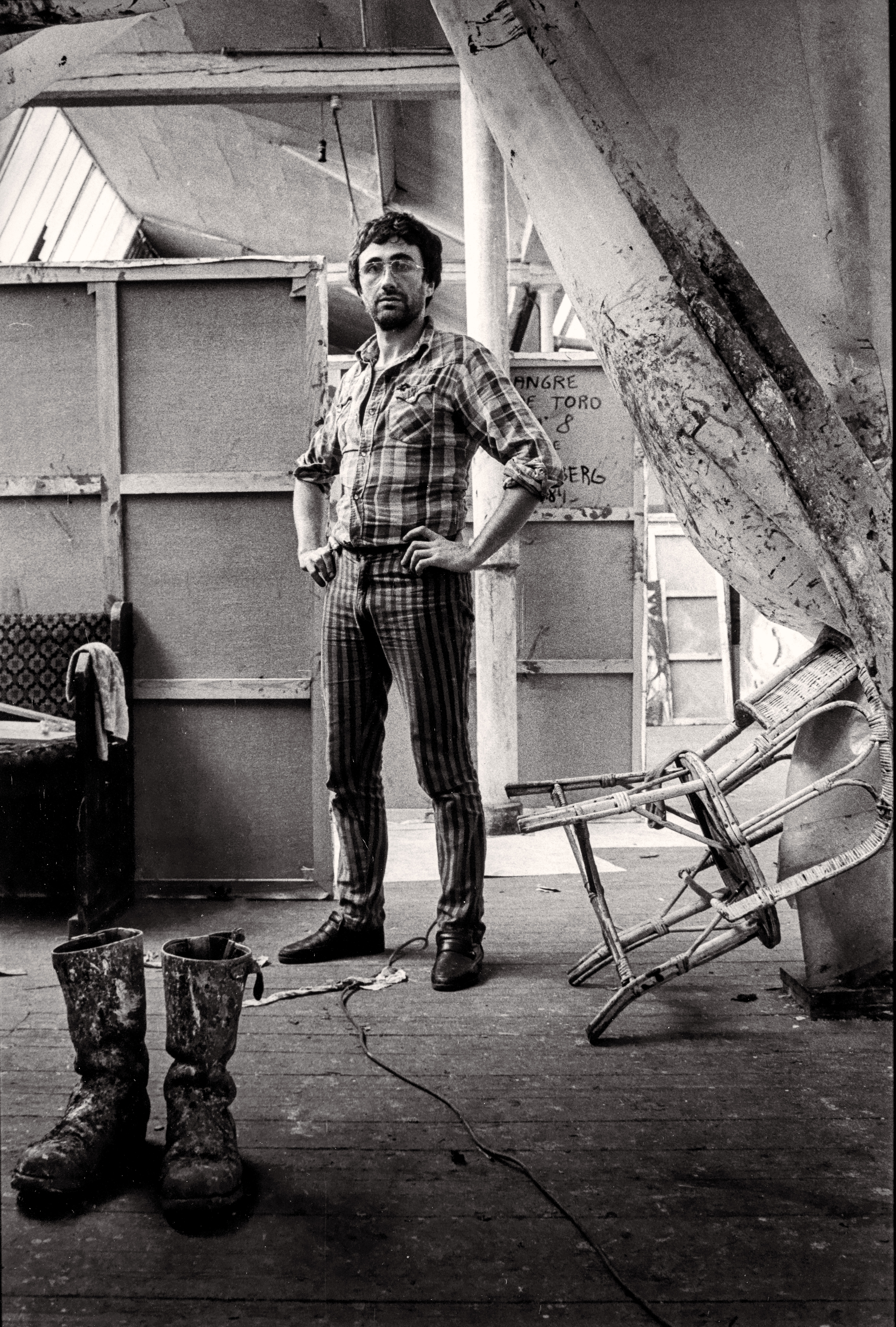
- Philippe Vandenberg in his studio in the Hofstraat, Ghent, 1984
- Born: Philippe Vandenberghe; 6 August 1952; Ghent, Belgium
- Died: 29 June 2009 (aged 56); Brussels, Belgium
- Education: Ghent University (literature and art history, 1970–1972); Royal Academy of Fine Arts, Ghent (1972–1976)
- Known for: Painting, drawing, printmaking, writing
- Movement: Neo-expressionism
- Spouse(s): Véronique D'Heygere (m. 1975) Oana Cosug
- Partner: Mieja D'Hondt (1978–1996)
- Children: 3
- Awards: Prix Emile Langui, Prix Jeune Peinture Belge (1981)

Philippe Vandenberg (1952–2009) was a Belgian painter.

== Biography ==
=== 1952–1981: Youth and education ===
Philippe Vandenberg was born in 1952, surnamed Vandenberghe. He was raised in Sint-Denijs-Westrem, a village near Ghent that was governed by his father, the liberal mayor of the township between 1970 and 1976. Growing up in a bourgeois family, the artist spoke both French and Dutch at home. Revolting against his family background, he changed his name to Vandenberg in 1982. At a young age he started to draw on a daily basis. When visiting the Museum of Fine Arts in Ghent as a teenager, the paintings by 16th to 20th century masters made a lasting impression.

Between 1970 and 1972, Vandenberg studied literature and art history at the Ghent University, before enrolling full-time at the Royal Academy of Art of Ghent in 1972. A year before graduating in 1976, Vandenberg married Véronique D’Heygere, who became his favourite model for painterly depictions of the female nude. Their daughter Hélène was born in 1977, their son Guillaume followed one year later. Several months thereafter, Vandenberg moved in with Mieja D’Hondt. During a trip to New York in 1978, he discovered the paintings of Jackson Pollock, Willem de Kooning, and Marc Rothko. The following years he visited Rembrandt's The Night Watch in the Rijksmuseum and the works of Francisco Goya and El Greco in the Prado.

=== 1981–1990: Neo-expressionism and the turn to the political ===
The renewal of interest in painting at the beginning of the 1980s, which coincided with the emergence of the Neue Wilde in Germany and the Transavanguardia in Italy, brought Vandenberg's work into the spotlight. In Picturaal I at the International Cultural Centre (ICC) in Antwerp (1981), a group exhibition of work by emerging Belgian painters, he showed a series of figurative Kruisigingen (Crucifixions). For these works he was awarded the Prix Emile Langui for painting at the Prix Jeune Peinture Belge that same year, leading to a one-year residency in the Cité Internationale des Arts in Paris.

In 1982, Vandenberg radically re-evaluated his work. Inspired by the dramatic passion of the Old Masters and the sense of space in the work of the Abstract Expressionists, he made his so-called Splinter Paintings. For these canvases, he deconstructed the human figure in his crucifixions into black and white shapes that he arranged in rhythmical grids. His works of the subsequent years are activated by a fierce stroke of the brush and swing between expressionist figuration and abstraction. The cycle De Geboorte (Birth), painted following the birth of Mo, his son with Mieja, was exhibited in the Richard Foncke Gallery in Ghent in 1983. It marked the start of a collaboration that would last for two decades. A 1986 solo show in New York at the Denise Cadé Gallery led to the acquisition of a painting by the Solomon R. Guggenheim Museum.

In 1988 Vandenberg traveled to Southwest America. He had exhibitions in France, The United States, and The Netherlands, and his paintings were highly sought after by collectors. Despite his growing success, he felt oppressed by the art market and the opportunistic stance of certain critics. He began to use motifs derived from graffiti art, as well as images distilled from comic books. In 1989, he introduced references to world politics into his work, such as swastikas, portraits of political or religious leaders, and men carrying dollar bills. Collectors failed to grasp the sudden turnabout in his oeuvre, a feeling shared by several critics, who fiercely rejected the works.

=== 1991–2000: Building an individual iconography ===
In the early 1990s, Vandenberg travelled around Europe. He visited the cathedrals of Chartres and Vézelay and went back to Toledo to see the works of El Greco in 1994. The influence of Christian iconography became increasingly visible in his work from this period, with the Book of Job and the Book of Revelation as important sources for the series of drawings he focused on in the mid-nineties. Concurrent with his experiments in poetry, writing was granted an autonomous role within his creative practice.

In 1995, Het zevende zegel (The Seventh Seal), one of his first large-scale ensembles, was shown in JOB XIII, 12, an exhibition curated by Jan Hoet for the Museum of Contemporary Art (S.M.A.K.) in Ghent. It marked the reconciliation between the artist and the curator, after the latter had publicly disavowed his work in 1989. Also in 1995, two radical gestures intersect his oeuvre: Vandenberg overpainted older works with layers of black paint, known as his Grandes noires (Large Blacks), and employed his own blood for a series of drawings. Furthermore, his many lectures of that period herald the start of a series of essays in which he reflects on his art and artistry.

In the mid-nineties, Vandenberg often resided in Marseille and travelled to Indonesia, Laos, Thailand, and Cuba. The religious and cultural practices of these countries were processed in numerous sketchbooks, taking up an important place in his oeuvre. Inspired by the crucial interventions of 1995, he also started to work on larger ensembles. Le Cannibal en Larmes (The Cannibal in Tears), a series of blood drawings, was succeeded by L'esprit est voyageur, l’âme est vagabonde (The Spirit Is a Traveller, The Soul Is a Vagabond). In the latter ensemble, which was first shown at Albert Baronian in 1997, he combined word paintings with panels populated by fairy-tale characters and Old Testament figures. In 1999, Vandenberg had first retrospective at the Museum of Contemporary Art in Antwerp (M HKA).

=== 2000–2009: Geometry, words and figuration ===
After his M HKA show Vandenberg frequently resided in Paris, where he drew and wrote, and devoured films in the local cinemas. In 2000, he returned to The Royal Academy of Ghent to take up a one-year teaching position. Suffering from depression and substance abuse, he was confined to hospital in 2001. The same year he completed a series of portraits that he had originally started in 1999. These include depictions of Ulrike Meinhof, a leader of the Red Army Faction, the writer and dramatist Antonin Artaud, and a number of self-portraits. At the same time, he painted the cycles L’Ennemi Intérieur (The Enemy Inside), In Memoriam Ulrike Meinhof and Étude pour Artaud (Study for Artaud), which depict the subjects of these paintings being violently attacked. Throughout the years following, increasingly recurring symbols such as the cross and the swastika were combined in geometric compositions. An example is the series of etchings entitled Exil De Peintre (The Painter's Exile), which he published as a book and presented in an exhibition of the same name at the Caermersklooster in Ghent in 2003.

When leaving Ghent for Brussels in 2005, Vandenberg bought a studio in Molenbeek. Another monochromic phase was preluded when he started to overpaint works in grey, orange and yellow. Letters and words reappeared on these monochrome canvases, like the enigmatic K.A. or the sentence L’important c’est le kamikaze (The Importance Is the Kamikaze), which was also the title of his 2006 exhibition at the Musée Arthur Rimbaud in Charleville-Mézières in France. Continuing to work on alternating geometric, figurative and monochrome cycles, these image schemes began to blur together: letters turned into geometrical grids, abstract compositions were intruded by figures, and monochromes served as backgrounds for words. His Molenbeek Drawings from 2007 are key examples of this tendency. In one of the drawings, which Vandenberg mockingly entitled Le Carousel, cuboid forms with legs circle a central figure under the inscription Dieu me l'a dit (God Told Me). This motif served as a starting point for a cycle of large-scale paintings and also appears in the Sint-Jans Suite (Saint John Suite), a series of etchings that he based on his drawings. The artist had his last overseas exhibition at the Envoy Gallery in New York in 2008. In the exhibition Visite, his oeuvre was presented in a dialogue with the permanent collection of the Museum of Fine Arts in Ghent. Vandenberg committed suicide in 2009.

== Selected exhibitions ==
- Campo Santo, Sint-Amandsberg, Philippe Vandenberg: De Kruisigingen 1982–1993, November 6–December 5, 1993
- Vlaams Cultureel Centrum De Brakke Grond, Amsterdam, In de verborgenheid van het icoon: Philippe Vandenberg–Ton Slits, March 10-April 9, 1995
- Museum Dhondt–Dhaenens, Deurle, Philippe Vandenberg—Markus Oehlen, April 9–May 14, 1995
- MSK—Museum van Hedendaagse Kunst Gent, Ghent, Diptychon I: Philippe Vandenberg (Job XIII, 12), April 4–June 5, 1995
- M HKA—Museum van Hedendaagse Kunst, Antwerp, Philippe Vandenberg: Œuvre 1995–1999, December 11, 1999–February 6, 2000
- Museum Dr. Guislain, Ghent, Philippe Vandenberg: Pelgrims Keel, June 21–September 14, 2003
- Caermersklooster—Provinciaal Centrum voor Kunst en Cultuur, Ghent, Philippe Vandenberg: Exil de peintre, December 12, 2003– January 25, 2004
- Musée Arthur Rimbaud, Charleville-Mézières, Philippe Vandenberg “L’important c’est le kamikaze”: Oeuvre 2000–2006, July 1–September 10, 2006
- Angel Orensanz Foundation, Center for the Arts, New York, Le Point Zero: Philippe Vandenberg, March 27–April 4, 2008
- MSK—Museum voor Schone Kunsten, Gent/Ghent, Artist in Residence—Philippe Vandenberg: “Visite”, April 12–August 17, 2008
- De Pont—Museum van Hedendaagse Kunst, Tilburg, Philippe Vandenberg & Berlinde De Bruyckere: Innocence Is Precisely, Never to Avoid the Worst, June 30– November 25, 2012
- La Maison Rouge—Fondation Antoine de Galbert, Paris, Philippe Vandenberg & Berlinde De Bruyckere: Il me faut tout oublier, February 13–May 11, 2014
- The Drawing Room, London, Philippe Vandenberg: Crossing the Circle, September 21– November 13, 2016
- Hamburger Kunsthalle, Hamburg, Philippe Vandenberg. Kamikaze, November 16, 2018 – February 24, 2019

== Selected bibliography ==
Monographs

- Applin, Jo & Mary Doyle. Philippe Vandenberg: Crossing the Circle. Ghent: MER. Paper Kunsthalle, 2012.
- Bex, Florent, ed. Philippe Vandenberg: Œuvre 1995–1999. Antwerp: M HKA—Museum van Hedendaagse Kunst Antwerp, 1999.
- Davidts, Wouter, ed. Philippe Vandenberg. Abstract Works. Seoul: Gallery Baton, 2016.
- Davidts, Wouter, ed. Absence etc. New York: Hauser & Wirth Publishers, 2017.
- De Bruyckere, Berlinde & Brett Littman. Philippe Vandenberg–Berlinde De Bruyckere: Innocence Is Precisely: Never to Avoid the Worst. Milan: Skira Editore, 2012.
- De Lannoy, Anja, ed. Philippe Vandenberg: “Visite”. Ghent: Museum voor Schone Kunsten Gent, 2008.
- Dezeuze, Anne, Brigitte Kölle & John C. Welchman. Live or Die: Philippe Vandenberg–Bruce Nauman. Veurne: Hannibal Publishing, 2017.
- Tourneux, Alain, ed. Philippe Vandenberg “L’important c’est le kamikaze”: Œuvre 2000–2006. Charleville-Mézières: Musée Arthur Rimbaud; Ghent: Online, 2006.
- Vanden Berghe, Jan & Patrick Van Rossem. Philippe Vandenberg: Reflections on the Drawings. Brussels: Estate Philippe Vandenberg; Tilburg: De Pont—Museum van Hedendaagse Kunst, 2012.

Texts by Vandenberg

- “Ghent, 25–26 March 1995: Dear Jan”. In: Philippe Vandenberg: (JOB XIII, 12), edited by Norbert De Dauw & Hans Martens, 16–20. Ghent: Museum van Hedendaagse Kunst Gent, 1995.
- “The State of Things: 1993–1995”. In: Philippe Vandenberg: Œuvre 1995–1999, edited by Florent Bex, 267. Antwerp: M HKA—Museum van Hedendaagse Kunst, 1999.
- “Seven Journeys to a Holy Sepulchre”. In: Philippe Vandenberg: Œuvre 1995–1999, edited by Florent Bex, 271–72. Antwerp: M HKA—Museum van Hedendaagse Kunst, 1999.
- “On His Way in a Cage is a Man, His Hands Red”. In: Philippe Vandenberg: Œuvre 1995–1999, edited by Florent Bex, 292–304. Antwerp: M HKA—Museum van Hedendaagse Kunst, 1999.
- “Pelgrims Keel: Proloog—Fra Angelico—Epiloog”. In: Pelgrims Keel, edited by Lieve Foncke, unpag. Kessel-Lo: Literarte, 2003.
- “Letter to the Nigger”. In: Philippe Vandenberg “L’important c’est le kamikaze”: Œuvre 2000–2006, 143–151. Charleville-Mézières: Musée Arthur Rimbaud; Ghent: Online, 2006.
- “The Song of the Finch”. In: Philippe Vandenberg “L’important c’est le kamikaze”: Œuvre 2000–2006, 109–133. Charleville-Mézières: Musée Arthur Rimbaud; Ghent: Online, 2006.
- “As I’m Painting a Garden for St John’s Millbrook”. In: Philippe Vandenberg: Black a Garden for St John's Millbrook, 145–155. Ghent: Croxhapox, 2008.
