= Ernest Welvaert =

Belgian painter (1880–1946)

- Born: Ernest Welvaert ca. 1880; Lokeren, Belgium
- Died: ca. 1946; Uccle, Belgium
- Education: Royal Academy of Fine Arts of Antwerp
- Occupation: Painter

Ernest Welvaert (1880 – 1946) was a Belgian painter.

== Life and work ==
He was born in Lokeren, East Flanders, Belgium, in 1880. He studied at the Royal Academy of Fine Arts of Antwerp. Among his fellow students there were Joe English, Isidoor Opsomer, and Maurice Sys. He was influenced by Emile Claus and Theodoor Verstraete. During his career his style changed from Impressionism to Expressionism.

He married and then settled in the forest of Daknam. His paintings mostly depict the landscape and the people of Waasland.

In 1921 the family moved to Mechelen, and then to Uccle, where Welvaert died in 1946. In the latter part of his career his paintings' colors became gloomier. His last paintings are portraits and Brabant landscapes.

== Gallery ==
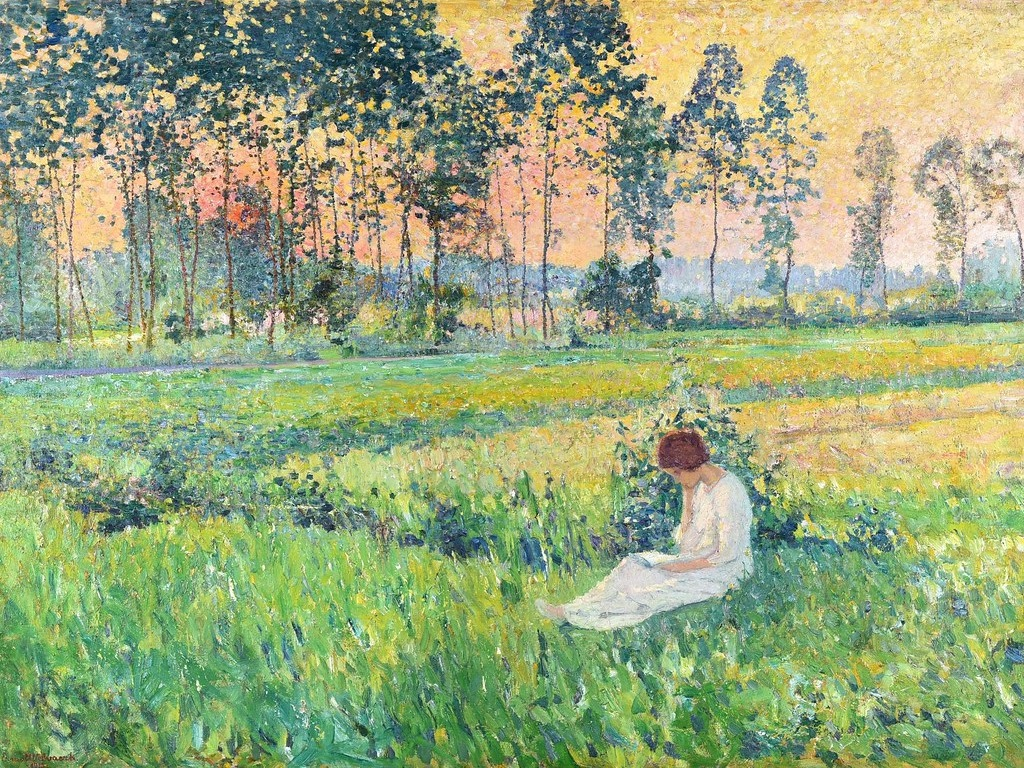
Sunday Afternoon

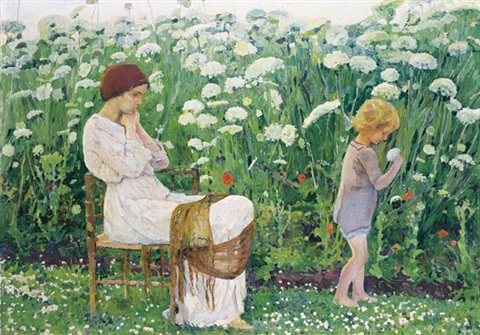
Zomer in het veld

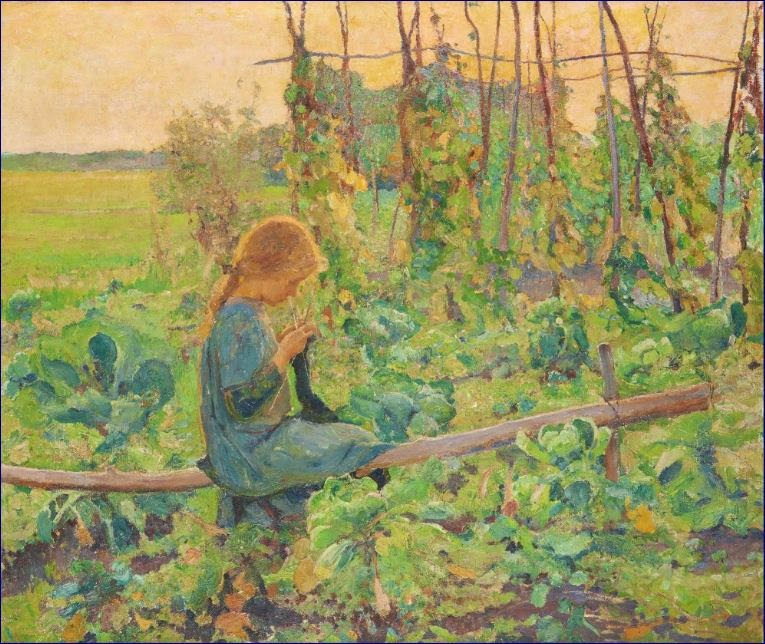
Knitting girl with hopfield in the background

== Sources ==
- Eemans, M. (1975). Moderne kunst in België. Hasselt: Heideland-Orbis.
- Piron, Paul (1999). De Belgische beeldende kunstenaars uit de 19de en 20ste eeuw volume 2. Art in Belgium. p. 1572.
