= Gaston Relens =

Gaston Relens (Mechelen, 9 March 1909 – Schaarbeek, 4 June 2011) was a Belgian painter working in Schaarbeek. He was taught by Gustave van de Woestijne at the Academy of Fine Arts in Mechelen (1930–1935) and later on by Anto Carte at the Academy of Fine Arts in Brussels.

== Biography ==
Gaston Relens was raised in Hofstade by his stepparents, “father Fons” Van Erp and “mother Lies” Trouwkens. Originally he was trained to become a brazier. But he enrolled in evening classes in drawing and painting at the Academy of Mechelen. Later on he continued at the Academy of Brussels.

In 1937 he obtained the first prize for painting summa cum laude and the golden medal of the Belgian government for his painting “The Battle at Woeringen." During the war he was obliged to find a job to make a living and stopped painting until 1957. His interest in painting, however, did not decline, and he continued visiting numerous exhibitions. At that time he worked in the local administration of Hofstade. Sometime later he was engaged as a technical draughtsman by Eternit in Kapelle-op-den-Bos. In 1947 he married Andrée Dongrie, and they settled in Schaarbeek. He also did some work at the Ministry of Defense. From 1979 onwards, he often worked at his farmhouse in Ogy to paint.

He was sensitive to social themes, which influenced his choice of subjects, including rural life, urban isolation, war, and seasonal changes. Initially influenced by expressionism, his style later developed towards elements of magic realism and symbolism, with a focus on color and composition.

Numerous exhibitions have been held, especially in Brussels, Ghent, Antwerp, Mechelen, Lier, Genève, Villeneuve d'Ascq, and Leiden. Two important retrospectives have taken place in Mechelen, at the Cultureel Centrum Antoon Spinoy, from 6 October till 4 November 1990; and at the town hall of Schaarbeek, from 6 till 30 April 1991.

Gaston Relens lived in Rue de la Ruche / Bijenkorfstraat 43 in Schaarbeek.

== Bibliography ==
- André Dussart, Relens, Schoonaarde, 1976
- Nicole Verschoore, avant-propos de Paul Caso, Relens, Bruxelles : L. de Meyer, 1980
- Jacques Collard, Gaston Relens, L'aile de la fantaisie, in: 50 artistes de Belgique II, Bruxelles, 1986
- Alfons De Bleser, introduction by Remy De Cnodder, Gaston Relens, Sint-Niklaas, 1990
- Raymond Lacroix, René Turkry et André Dussart, Gaston Relens, Gemeente Schaarbeek, retrospective from 6th till 30 April 1991
- Raymond Lacroix, Wim Toebosch, Gaston Relens, Bruxelles : Mercenart, Art poche, 1996
- Joost De Geest, Relens, Bruxelles : Ars Libris, L. De Meyer-Nicolas Poncelet, 1997
