= Louis Van den Eynde =

Belgian painter and graphic artist (1881–1966)

- Portrait of a Young Man, 1924
- Born: Louis Van den Eynde; 25 January 1881; Anderlecht, Brussels, Belgium
- Died: 22 July 1966 (aged 85); Brussels, Belgium
- Education: Academy of Anderlecht
- Occupation: Painter

Louis Van den Eynde (25 January 1881 – 22 July 1966) was a Belgian painter. He was also a designer of ironwork, sgraffiti and posters.

== Biography ==
Van den Eynde was born in Anderlecht, Brussels, Belgium. His father was a well-known bootmaker who worked for the wealthy bourgeoisie. Louis Van den Eynde was born with a refined upbringing and proved to be gifted in drawing from an early age. By the age sixteen he had put his first work up for sale. He received an artistic education at the Municipal Drawing School in Anderlecht, then at the Art Academy in Brussels under the direction of Constant Montald, Louis Titz and Julien Dillens. Immediately after his studies he got a place as a teacher at the new Academy of Anderlecht. During the First World War he would give free lessons to the Anderlecht youth.

After the First World War, Van den Eynde discovered the seaside resort of De Panne. He got to know the beach, the sea and especially the fisherman's life. He portrayed the Pannese coast and fishermen in dozens of paintings, drawings, etchings and lithographs. In De Panne, he also designed the statue Pier Kloeffe, a close friend oh his, with whom he spent time out to sea.

In 1925-1926 he had a villa called Le Chalutier built in De Panne in the Dumont district, with a spacious and airy studio (P. Bortierlaan, 25; architects Myriam Dumont and Gaston Remy). The villa was donated by the relatives in 1997 to the municipality, which has left it completely in ruins. In 2003 Le Chalutier was protected as a monument.

=== Work ===
Van den Eynde painted hundreds of portraits, figures, nudes, interiors, still lifes, flower arrangements and landscapes. In his landscapes, there are the countryside with the farms, the country roads, the mills of Flanders, Brabant and France. He portrayed Flemish cities such as Damme, Bruges, Kortrijk, and the Senne in Brussels. In addition, there is the group with maritime themes from the De Panne period.

In his graphic work we find echoes of travels in France: etchings such as Paris St. Germain, A Cloister in Paris, The Seine in Paris, The Pont Neuf in Paris, or Country road in Marigny.

He also executed graffiti decorations on several buildings in Brussels and provided designs for ironwork for the house Lodewijk Van Boeckel in Lier.

For forty years he participated in the exhibitions of the Société des Artistes Français and in exhibitions in the Cercle Artistique de Bruxelles.

He lived at Emile Carpentierstraat, 41 in Brussels.

Harvest Scene

== Sources ==
- Lexicon van West-Vlaamse beeldende kunstenaars, 1, Kortrijk, 1992.
- Belgische stilleven- en bloemenschilderkunst 1750-1914 (tentoonstellingscat.), Oostende (Museum voor Schone Kunsten), 1994.
- Le dictionnaire des peintres belges du XIVième siècle à nos jours, Brussels, 1994.
- P. Piron, De Belgische beeldende kunstenaars uit de 19de en 20ste eeuw, Brussels, 1999.
- W. & G. Pas, Biografisch Lexicon Plastische Kunst in België. Schilders- beeldhouwers – grafici 1830-2000, Antwerp, 2000.
- W. & G. Pas, Dictionnaire biographique arts plastiques en Belgique. Peintres-sculpteurs-graveurs 1800-2002, Antwerp, 2002.
- Louis Van den Eynde, in Allgemeines Künstlerlexikon, 35, Munich-Leipzig, 2002.
