= François Cautaerts =

Belgian painter (1810–1881)

- Born: François Cautaerts ca. 1810; Brussels, First French Empire
- Died: 1881; Brussels, Belgium
- Occupation: Painter

François Cautaerts (1810 in Brussels – 1881 in Brussels) was a Belgian art painter from the 19th century. He made several paintings with a historical and religious character.

Some paintings by Cautaerts include:

- The pipe smoker (museum Bruges)
- Christ and the pharisees
- The theft of Orion by Aurora (1833)
- The saint family (1834)
- Milton and his lost paradise
- The bride (1836)
- Johanna Gray
- The card players
- The lively man
