= Peter Weidenbaum =

Belgian artist (born 1968)

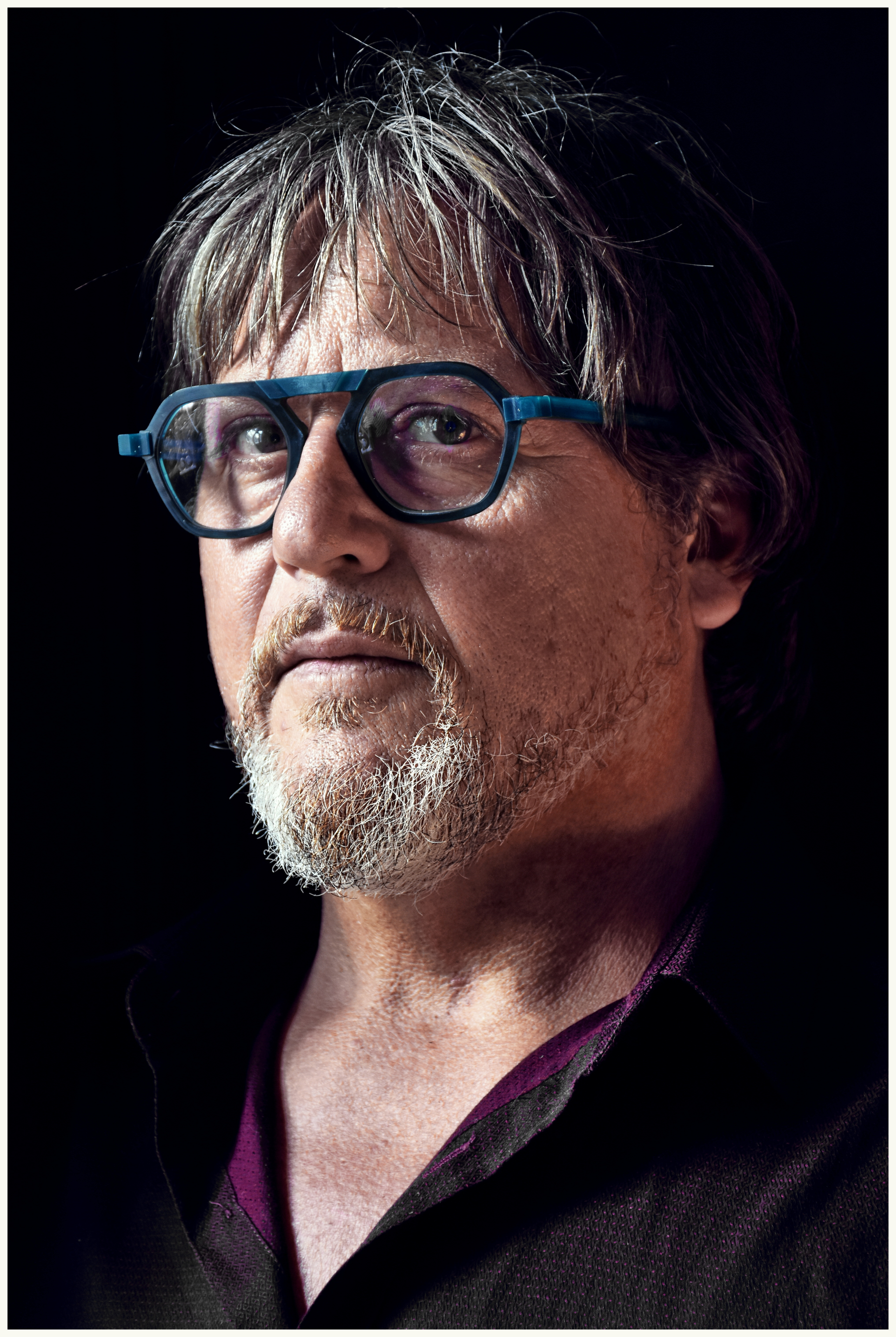
- Portrait of Belgium artist Peter Weidenbaum, 2022
- Born: Antwerp, Belgium

Peter Weidenbaum (born 25 July 1968, Antwerp, Belgium) is a Belgian artist.

== Education ==
He became acquainted with painting at an early age. He maintains that the confrontation with Jean Fouquet's painting "Madonna surrounded by seraphim and cherubim" at the Royal Museum of Fine Arts in Antwerp altered his view on reality.

In 1993, Weidenbaum enrolled in the Royal Academy of Fine Arts (KASK) in Antwerp and, at the behest of Walter Villain, he studied Monumental Art. During his time there, he sought inspiration from Sartre, Goethe and Jung, which led to the series "Greetings from Faust" and a string of works by the poet Paul van Ostaijen. Weidenbaum was also significantly influenced by the German expressionists Max Beckmann and George Grosz. In 2014 the public broadcast service showed Stream of Talent, a two-series documentary marking the 350th anniversary of KASK, featuring contributions from artists including Jan Fabre, Cindy Wright and Weidenbaum, talking about their memories of the academy.

== Work ==
In 1996, at the suggestion of artist Guillaume Bijl, Weidenbaum successfully applied for a training course at the Higher Institute for Fine Arts (HISK) in Ghent, where he explored the intersection between cartoon films and sculptural work. In 1999 he received an invitation from Stijn Huijts, director of the Het Domein Civic Museum in Sittard, in the Netherlands, which resulted in his first museum exhibition, the installation "Somebody puts something in my dreams". During this period, Weidenbaum also produced a few "fake reality" short films, in which his brother played the lead role. After his time at HISK, he worked for three years on the series "Out of the Forest", a set of cryptic sculptures, drawings, and paintings. During this period, Weidenbaum developed a close contact with the philosopher Willem Elias, who cited Weidenbaum in his book "Aspects of Belgian art beyond ‘45", under the heading of "neosymbolism", a particular style in Flanders labeled as the "Antwerp school", of which Luc Tuymans is the best-known representative. Elias includes Weidenbaum in his book, alongside Ronny Delrue and Koen van den Broek.

Weidenbaum's projects include "Daswald" (Antwerp, 2004), "Lookout" (Tienen, 2005), and "Poëzie" (Brussels, 2006), In 2006, Weidenbaum began a series of paintings named "Out of the series Car Crash", which resulted in the monumental sculpture "Alter Ego" in 2008.

== Collections ==
Work by the artist is held in the public collections of Provincie Flemish Brabant Sculptuur 'Alter Ego' / UZ Jette Integratie 'Green Velvet / Brussels Hoofdstedelijk Gewest Sculptuur 'Passing By' Montgomery / Brusselse Hoofdstedelijke Regering Painting 'Rotation' / Vlaamse Gemeenschapscommissie (VGC), Painting 'Reconcideration' / Stedelijk museum het Domein Sittard Nederland, Sculptuur 'Somebody puts something in my dreams'.

== Articles ==
- Willem Elias, 2016, Een ontmoeting met zichzelf en de zijnen, p. 68-71, Staalkaart #32, Staalkaart vzw, Puurs, Belgium
- Joannes Késenne, 2016, Een filosoof onder schilders, p. 15, H art No. 151, Idecom media, Antwerp, Belgium
- Arne Rombouts, 2013, Docu. Vrt Stroom van talent, Brussels, Belgium
- Willem Elias, 2012, Aspecten van de Belgische kunst na '45
