= Firmin Baes =

Belgian painter, pastel artist, draughtsman and print designer

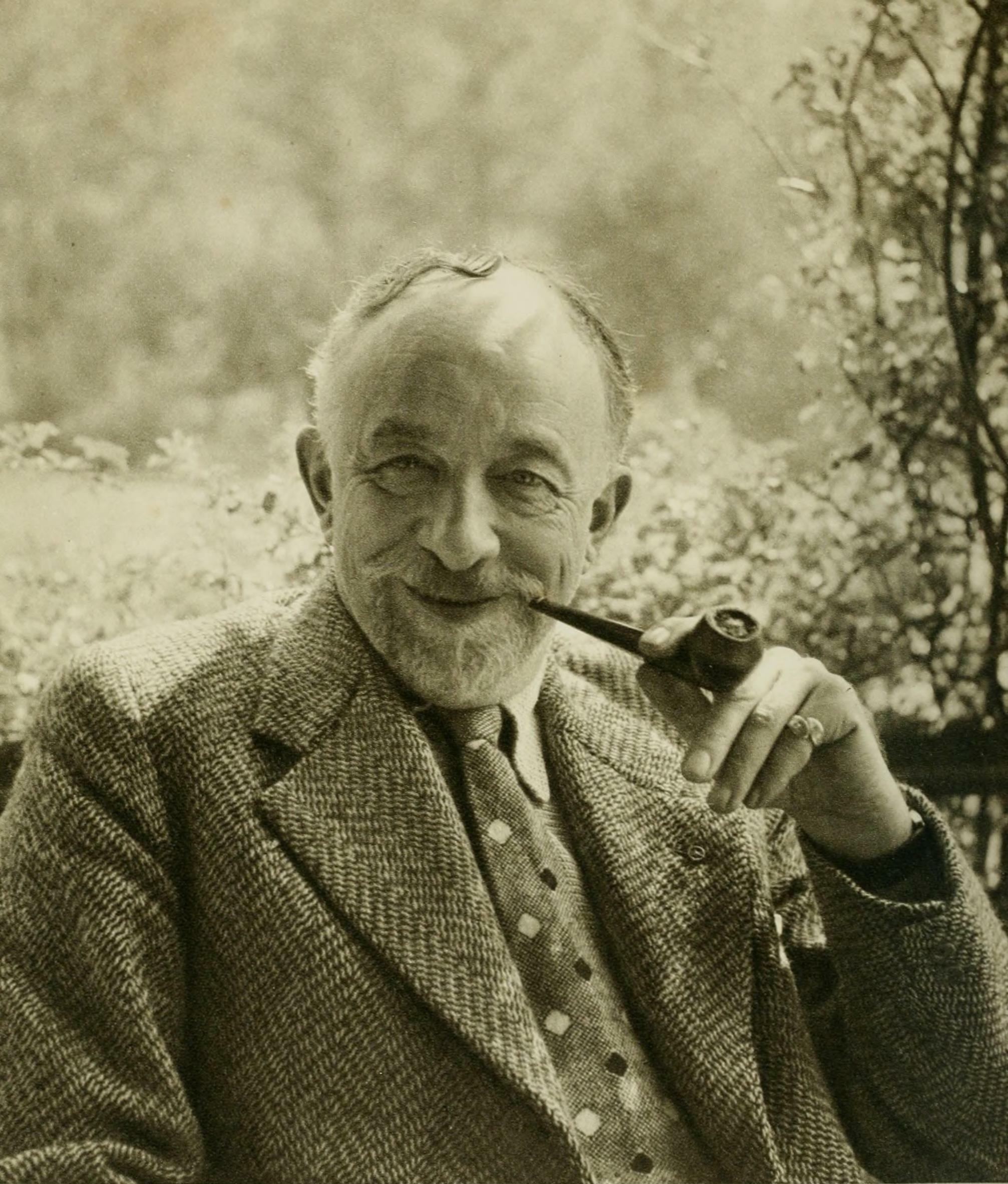
- Born: 18 April 1874; Saint-Josse-ten-Noode, Belgium
- Died: 4 December 1943 (aged 69); Ixelles, Brussels, Belgium
- Education: Académie Royale des Beaux-Arts
- Occupation: Painter
- Parent(s): Henri Baes and Héloïse Boly.

Firmin Baes (18 April 1874 – 4 December 1943) was a Belgian painter, pastel artist, draughtsman and print designer. His subject matter ranged from still lifes, genre scenes, portraits, nudes, landscapes and interiors. He became particularly skilled in working in pastel, a medium he used almost exclusively after 1900. He published in 1941 an illustrated booklet entitled Histoires de peintres racontées et illustrées par Firmin Baes containing anecdotes relating to painters and their work.

== Life ==
Baes was the son of Henri Baes and Héloïse Boly. His father was a decorative painter, architect, director of the École des arts décoratifs de Bruxelles and member of the Commission des Monuments historiques (Commission for historical monuments).

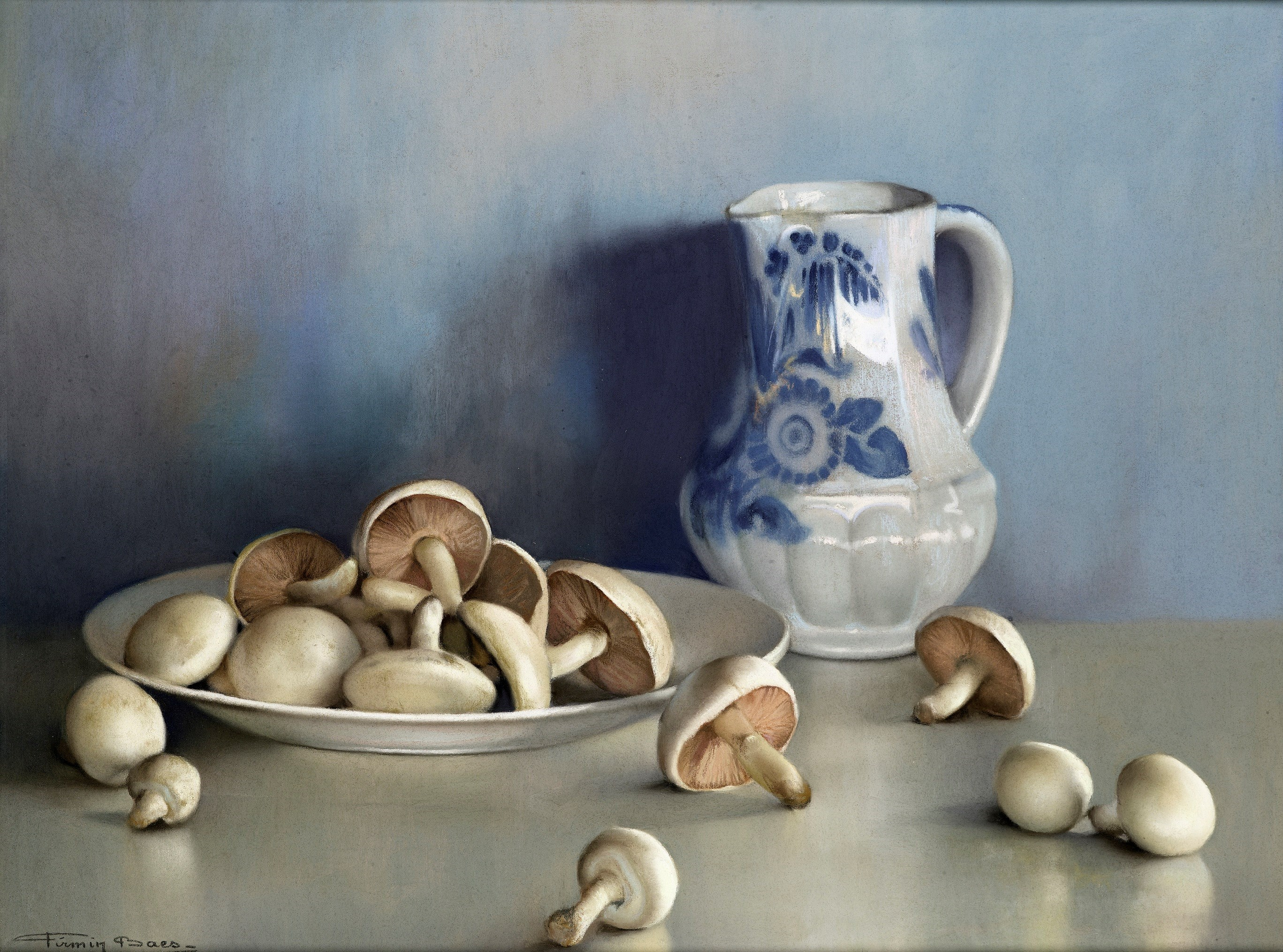
Still life with mushrooms and a pitcher, pastel on canvas

Baes was brought up in a family of artists. In addition to his father, his uncle Jean-Baptiste Baes was an architect. Firmin was trained as a decorator along his father while decorating patrician houses and making decorative panels for hotels in Brussels. His career as a decorator developed parallel to his vocation as a painter. While working with his father he met around 1880, the painter Léon Frédéric who became his master. From 1888 to 1894, Baes was enrolled at the Académie Royale des Beaux-Arts in Brussels, where he studied at same time as Emile Fabry and Victor Rousseau, who became his friends. With these artists he got involved in the so-called 'Académie de la Patte de Dindon' (Academy of the Turkey Paw) from 1894. This was a free academy at which art classes were given that was named after a cafe of the same name on the Grand-Place in Brussels.

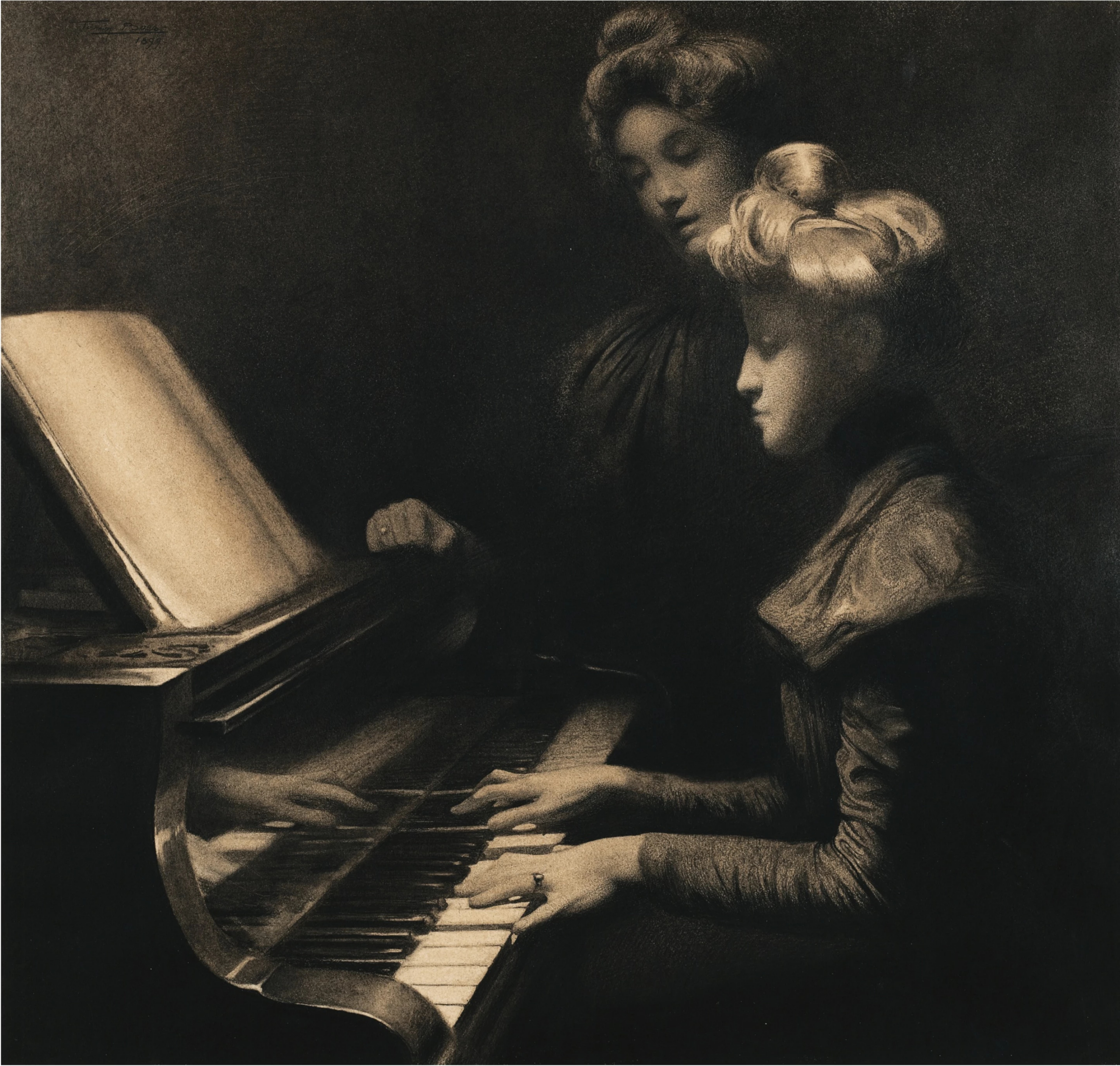
The piano lesson, charcoal drawing

In 1897 he competed in the Prix Godecharle with a work called The Prodigal Son but he lost to Alfred Bastien. He became close to the group of artists around the magazine Pour l'Art which was published by Octave Maus, Edmond Picard and Emile Verhaeren. In 1898, Firmin Baes joined the group which already counted Jean Delville, Victor Rousseau, Hector Thys, Emile Fabry and others as its members. In 1900, he exhibited at the show Pour l'Art an oil on canvas painting of Archers with which later that year he obtained the bronze medal at the World's fair of Paris.

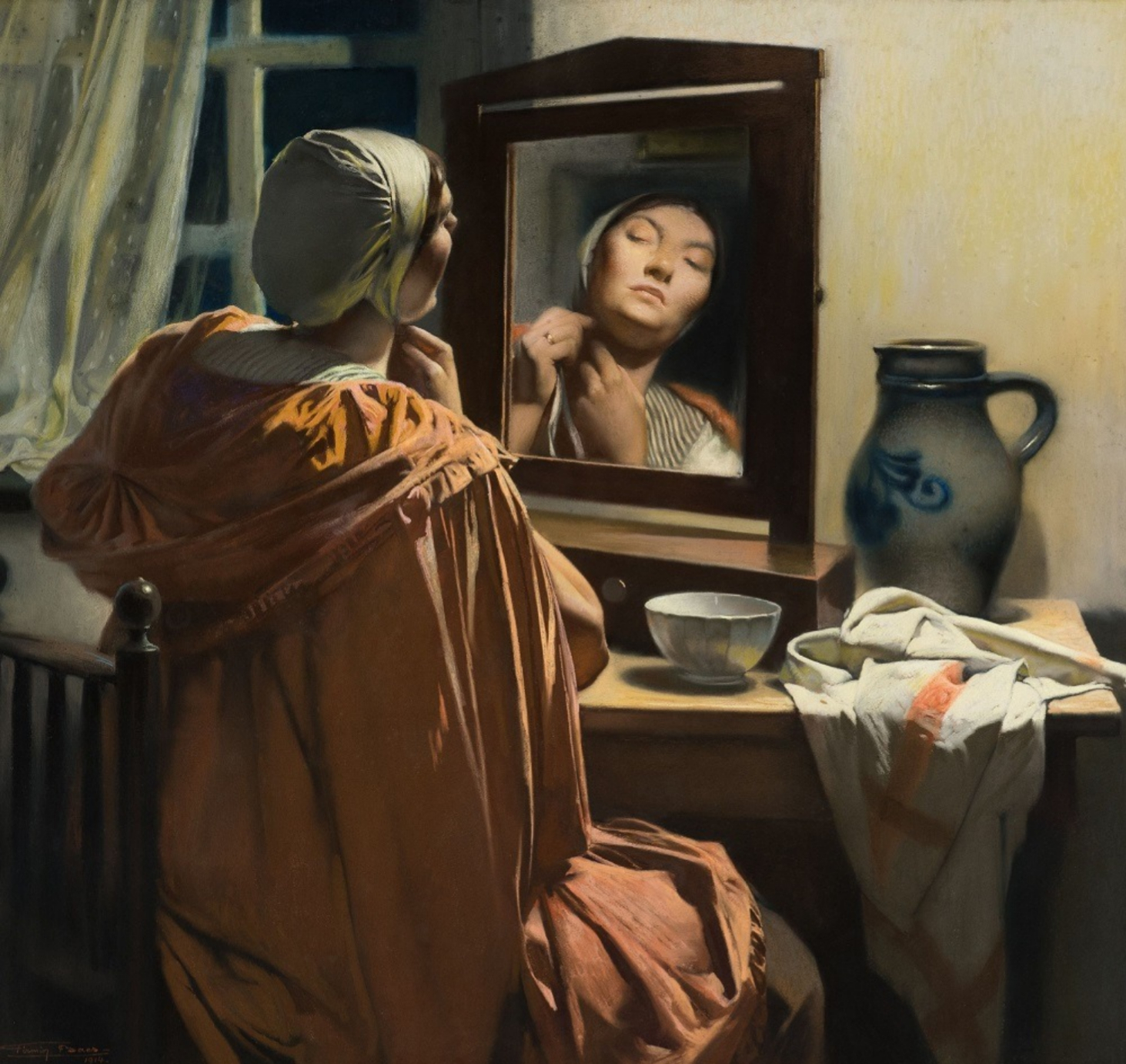
Woman at her toilet, pastel on paper laid down on canvas

With workers of his father, Firmin Baes developed a pastel technique on canvas which contributed in large part to his fame. The new techniques allowed the application of a powder, with the tip of the thumb or the little finger, to creates a discreet or vigorous aspect to the tone as well as a velvety delicacy to his compositions. The technique brings the essential complement to this artistic evolution which became more impressionistic.

In 1902 he married Marie Nélis, a friend of his two sisters, Irma and Alice. They had three daughters. His artistic career took off and he achieved domestic and international recognition and financial success. He exhibited frequently in Brussels at Petite Galerie and the galerie du Studio and in Charleroi at the Nouvelles Galeries. He was an amateur actor and was a member of a revue for which he wrote pieces.

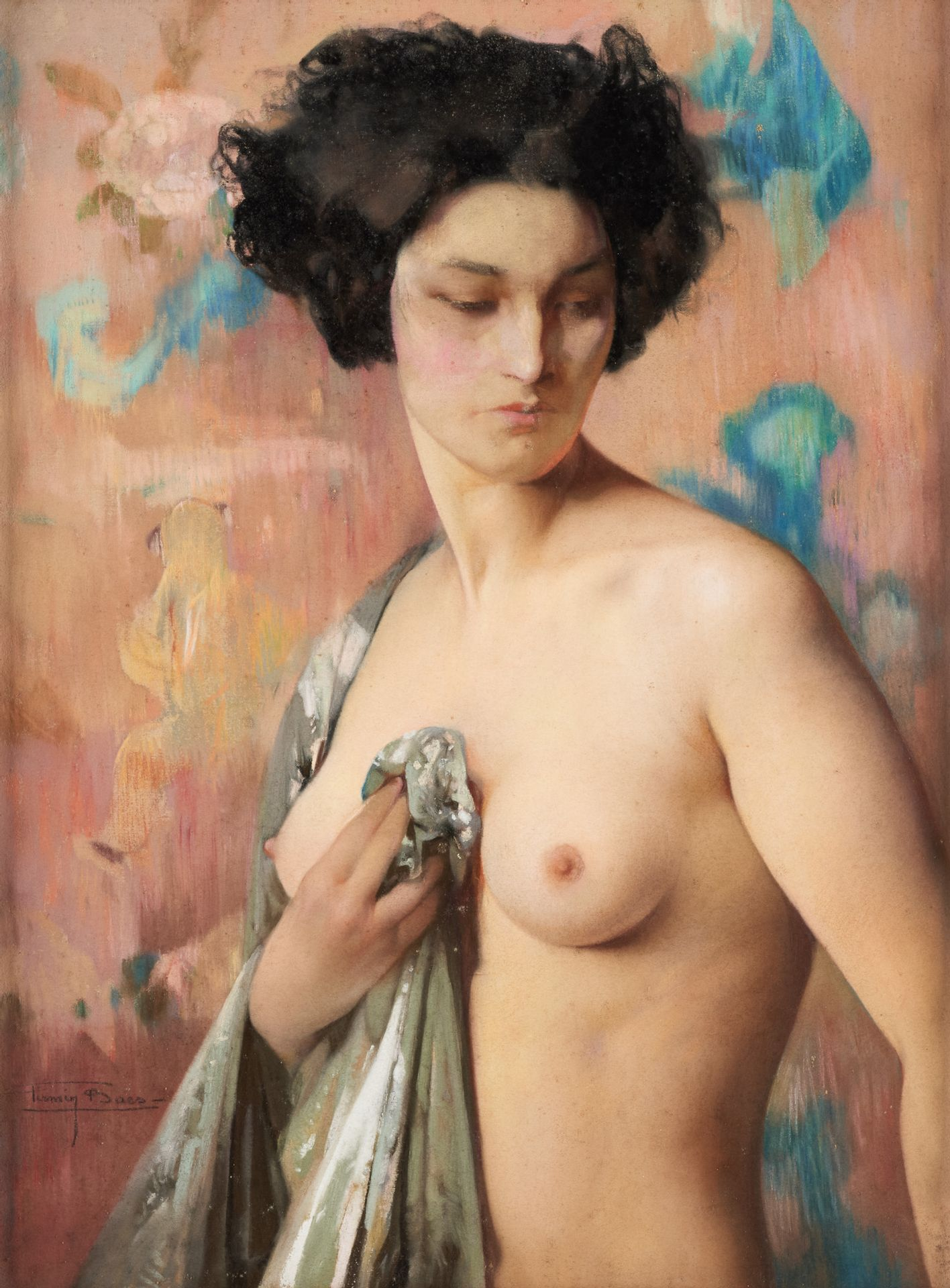
Female nude, pastel on canvas

He was made an Officer in the Order of the Crown in 1923.

== Work ==
Firmin Baes was a prolific artist who painted, made works in pastel and designed prints and posters. His subject matter ranged from still lifes, genre scenes, portraits, nudes, landscapes and interiors. He became particularly skilled in working in pastel, a medium he used almost exclusively after 1900. An able draftsman, his work is distinguished by its cold realism, the surety of its line and its high level of observation.

From around 1900 he worked almost exclusively in pastel. He achieved a virtuoso technique which is reminiscent of earlier masters in this medium such as Jean-Baptiste Chardin. His pastels were typically applied on canvas, rather than on paper or board. These works are usually executed on a large scale and show a refined technique and luminous colour. His mastery of pastel allowed him to obtain all color ranges.

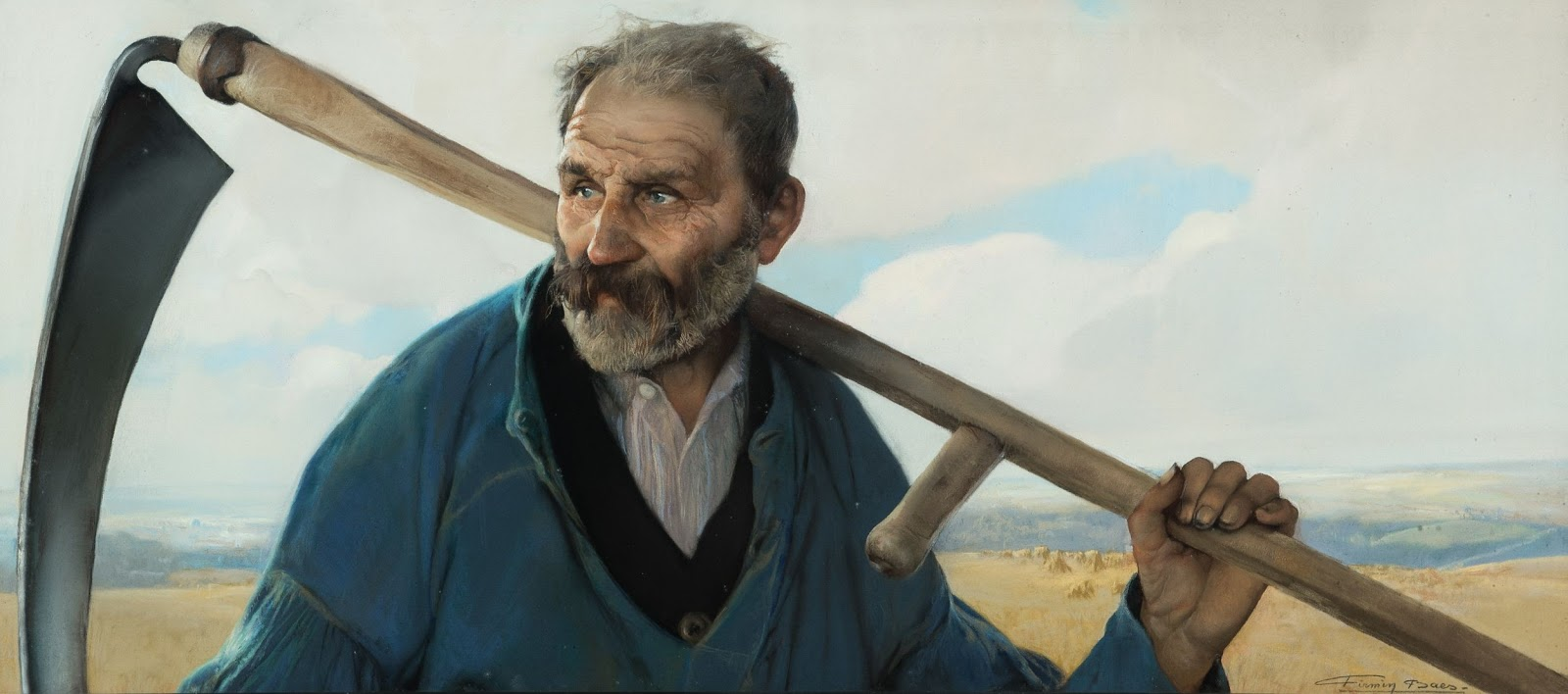
The mower, pastel on paper

Another technique in which Baes excelled was charcoal drawing. He liked drawing on large sized sheets as demonstrated in The piano lesson.

Baes was active as a lithographer and designed various exhibitions posters for the Pour l'Art artist circle.

A writer in his spare time, Baes authored an illustrated booklet entitled Histoires de peintres racontées et illustrées par Firmin Baes (Histories of painters told and illustrated by Firmin Baes), containing anecdotes relating to painters and their work (published in 1941 in Brussels, Librairie Générale-Cooreman).
