= Jenny Montigny =

Belgian painter (1875–1937)

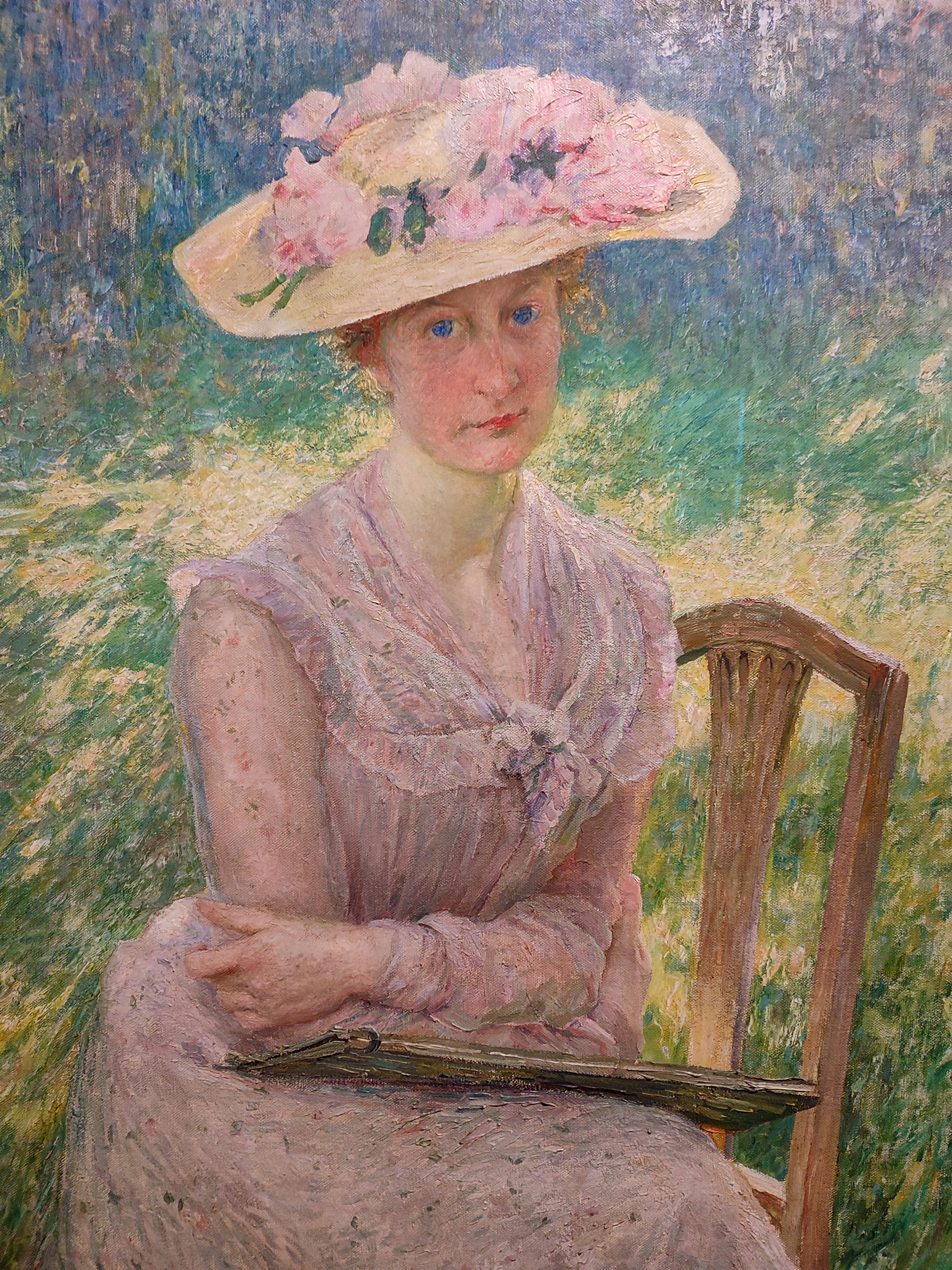
Jenny Montigny, portrait by Emile Claus (1902)

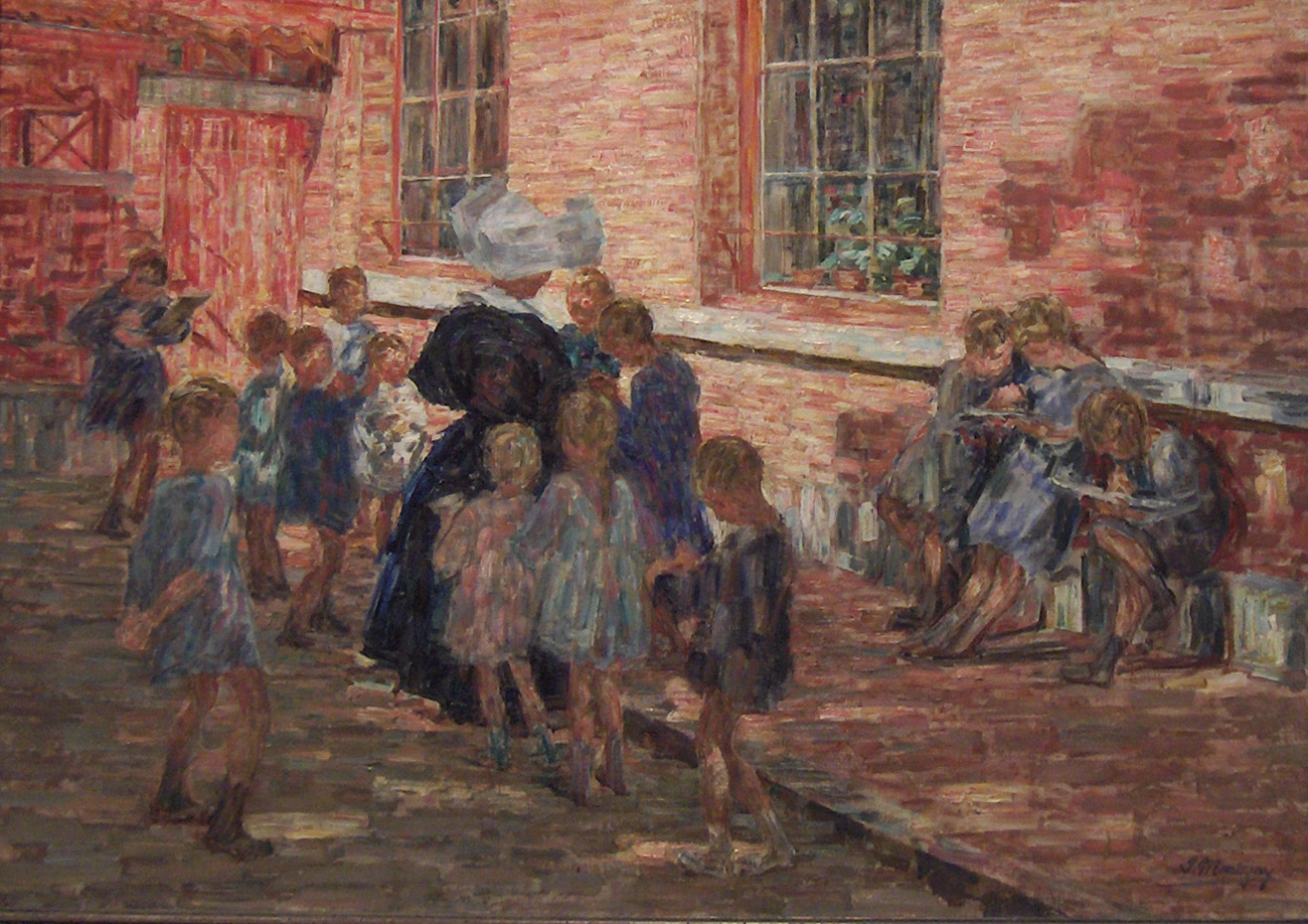
Nursery School in Deurle

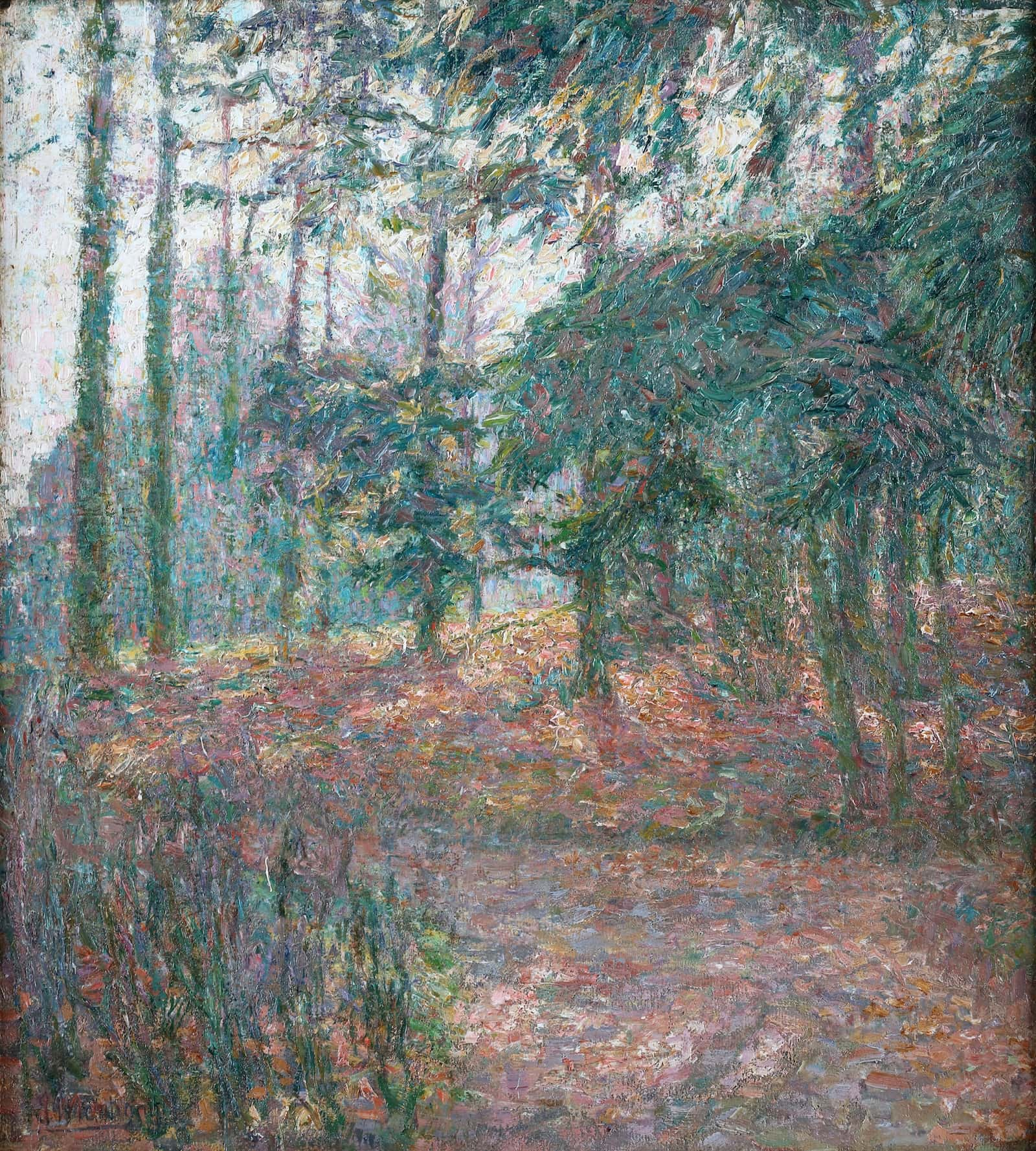
A forest view during the daytime (Belgian collection)

Jeanne (Jenny) Montigny (8 December 1875, Ghent – 31 October 1937, Deurle) was a Belgian painter.

== Life ==
Montigny's father was a lawyer and government official who oversaw several boards and commissions and was later Dean of the law faculty at the University of Ghent. Her mother was of English origin. At seventeen, she decided to become an artist, knowing that she could not count on her parents' support. (Her father once remarked "De kunsten laten me helemaal koud."...The arts leave me totally cold.)

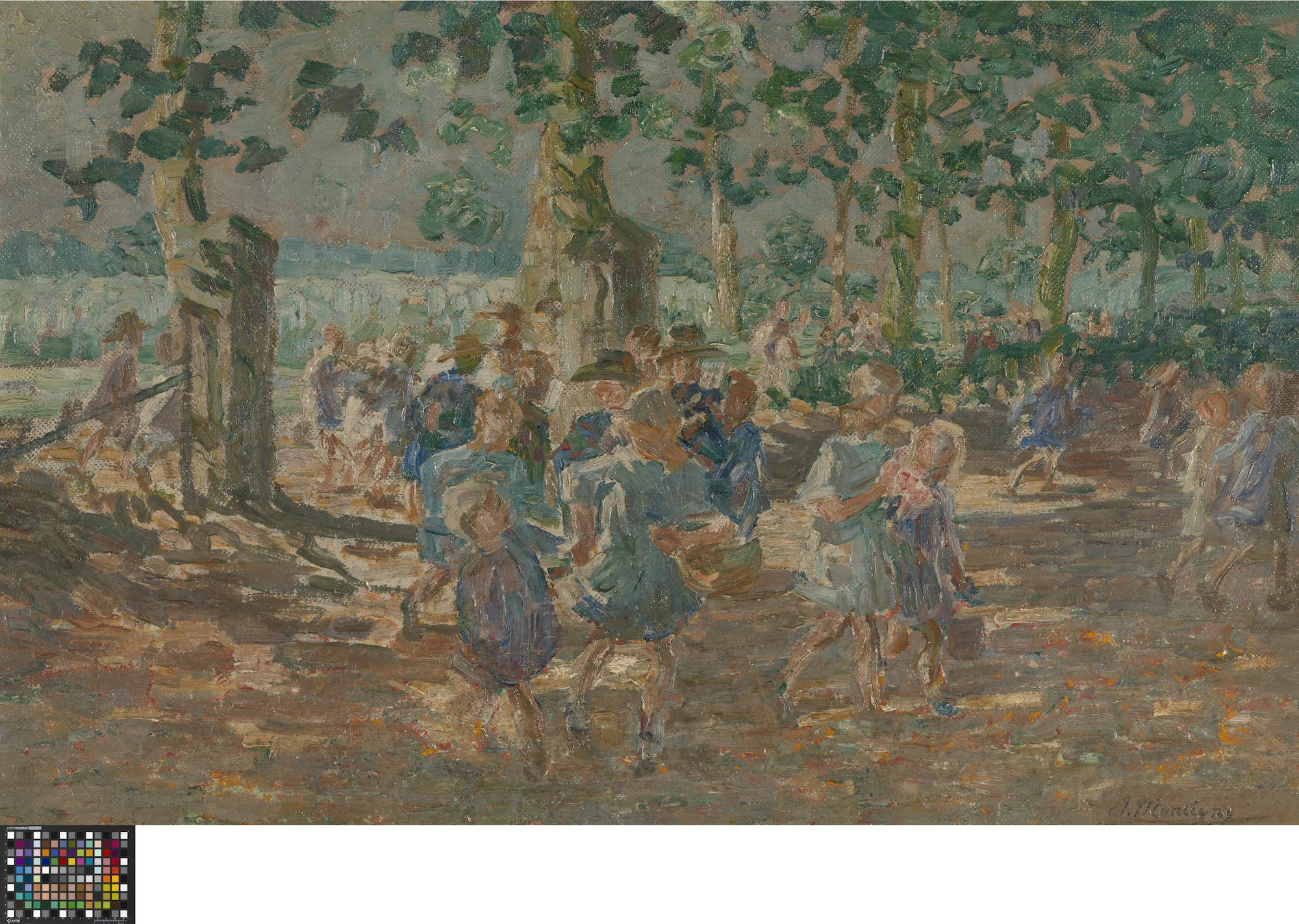
Playground Museum van Deinze en de Leiestreek

After seeing a painting by Emile Claus (The Kingfishers), Montigny decided to seek out a position in his studios near Deinze. In the summer of 1893, she and several other female students took his course in plein air painting. After 1895, she commuted regularly between Ghent and Deinze. Despite the fact that Claus was married and twenty-six years her senior, they began a relationship that lasted until his death in 1924. In 1902, she made her debut at the Ghent Salon, followed by shows in Paris. Two years later, she and her younger brother moved into a villa in Deurle. She later became a member of the luminist group Vie et Lumière.

At the outbreak of World War I, she followed Claus and his wife in emigrating to London, where she became a member of the Women's International Art Club and exhibited at the Grafton Galleries. After the war, she returned to Belgium and, finding it necessary to sell her villa, moved into a more modest home. In 1923, she joined the Société Nationale des Beaux-Arts. After Claus' death, she found herself in worsening financial straits. Her painting style was no longer popular and it was necessary to accept charity from family and friends. She was largely forgotten after her death until 1987, when exhibitions were held in Deurle and Deinze. In 1995, a major retrospective took place at the Musée Pissarro in Pontoise.
