= Cindy Wright =

Belgian-American painter

- Self-portrait, 2009
- Born: November 29, 1972 (age 53); Herentals, Belgium
- Occupation: Painter

Cindy Wright is an artist who was born in Herentals, Belgium on November 29, 1972. She earned a Master in the Visual Arts (painting) from the Royal Academy of Fine Arts (Antwerp) in 1996 and a laureate at the Higher Institute for Fine Arts, Antwerp in 2006. She currently lives and works in Antwerp.

She is best known for her large-scale paintings with a macabre twist, often described as photorealism. Untitled (Self-portrait) from 2008, in the collection of the Honolulu Museum of Art, demonstrates the artist's gritty, non-idealized style. The Frederick R. Weisman Art Foundation (Los Angeles), the Het Museum van Elsene (Brussels, Belgium), the Honolulu Museum of Art, the Las Vegas Art Museum, the Madison Museum of Contemporary Art (Madison, Wisconsin), the Museum of Contemporary Art San Diego (California), and the Royal Academy of Fine Arts (Antwerp) are among the public collections holding work by Cindy Wright.

== Bibliography ==
- Lumpkin, Libby, Cindy Wright, Paintings 2004-2006, Las Vegas Art Museum, 2006.
- Mark Moore Gallery, Cindy Wright, Antwerp, Mark Moore Gallery, 2009.
