= Albert Tschautsch =

German painter

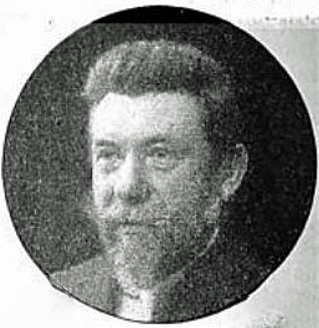
Albert Tschautsch

Albert Tschautsch (20 December 1843 – 18 January 1922) was a German genre painter.

== Life and career ==
Tschautsch was born in Seelow. He studied at the Academy of Arts in Berlin from 1863 to 1867, under Julius Schrader. He began exhibiting in 1870. In 1874–78 he was in Rome. He later taught at the Royal School of Art in Berlin, where he became a professor in 1895. He died in Berlin and was buried in the Lichterfelde Cemetery; his grave has not been preserved.

== Works ==
Many of Tschautsch's paintings depict subjects from fairy tales (such as "The Princess and the Spindle" from Sleeping Beauty) and legends and from works by Shakespeare and Uhland. He also painted portraits and historical subjects. In 1878 he painted the Adoration of the Shepherds and the Descent from the Cross in the transept of St. Joseph's Carmelite church in Posen, now Poznań, Poland.

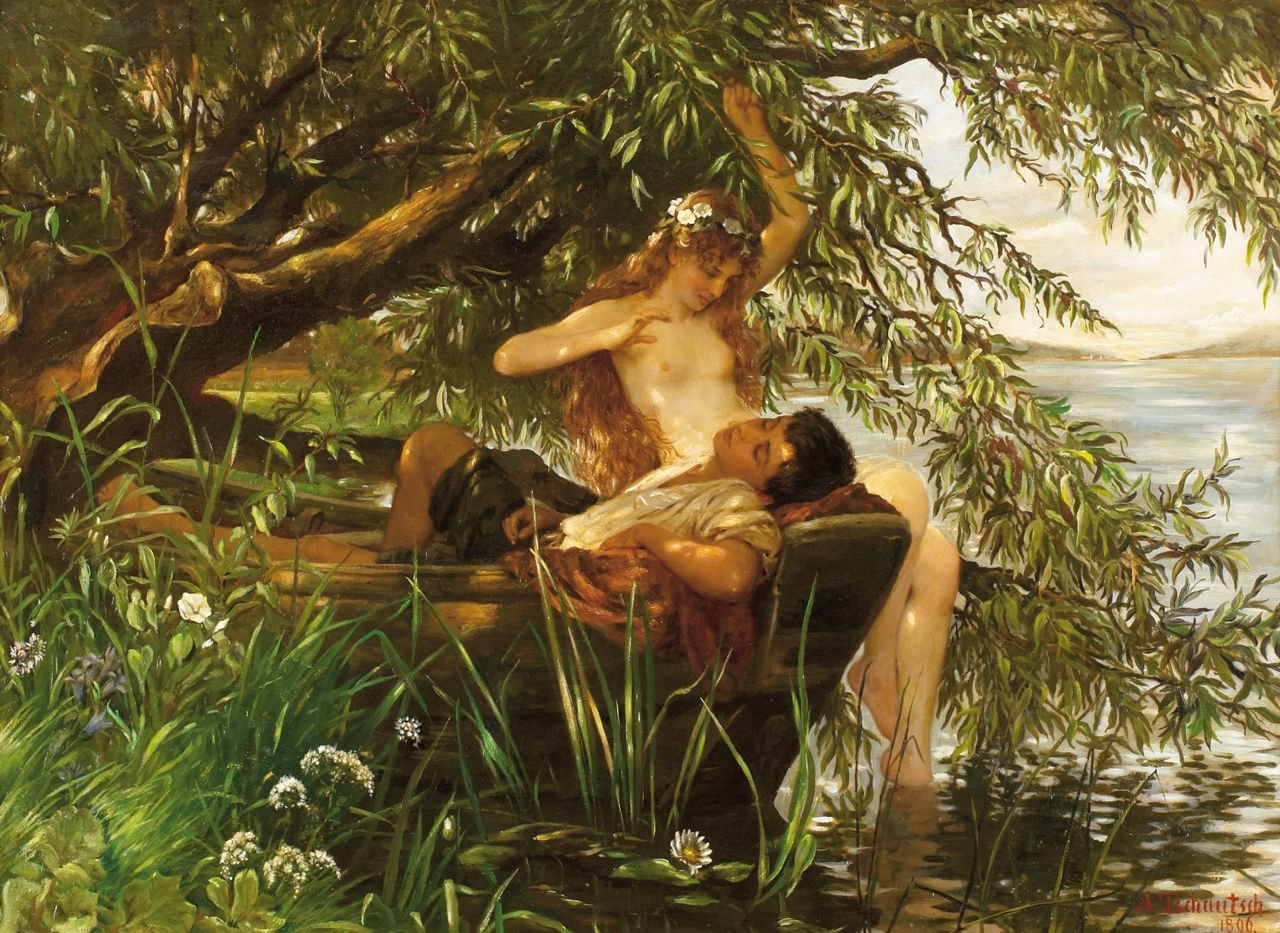
Enchantment (1896)

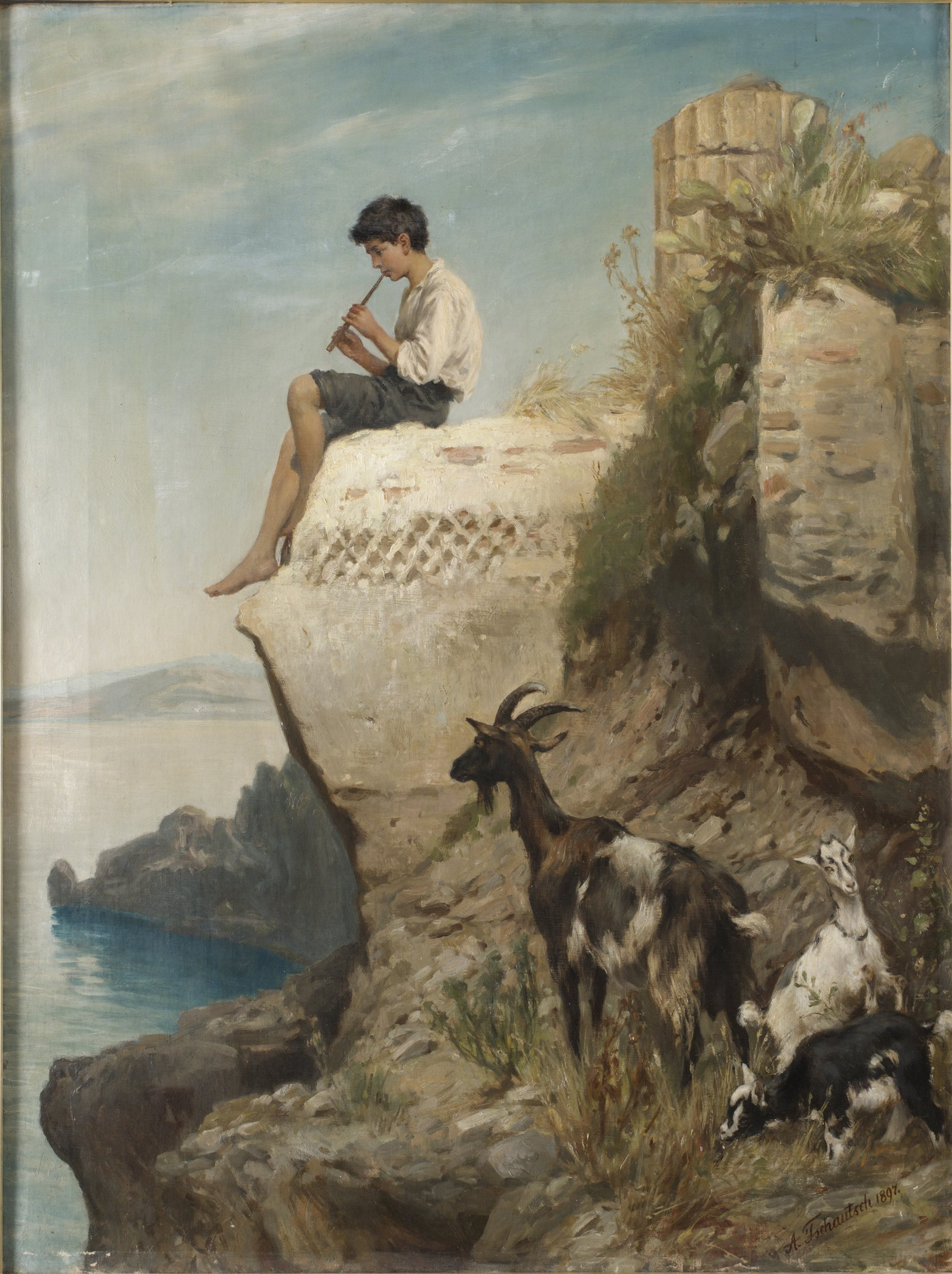
Herd Boy Playing the Flute Among Ruins (1897)
