= Etude of the life of the Russian Tsars =

1865 painting by Russian artist Vyacheslav Schwarz

Etude of the life of the Russian Tsars (Chess playing)
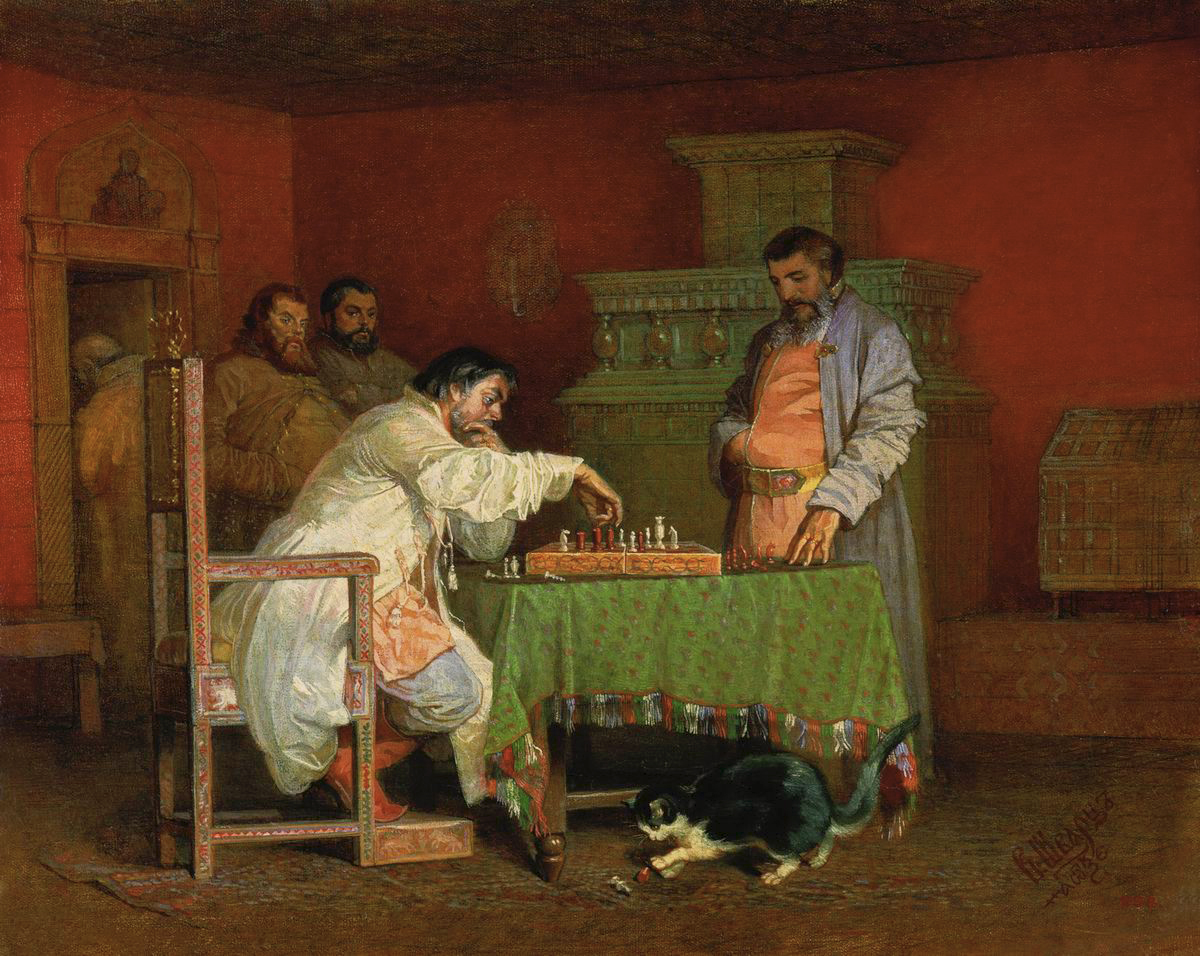
- Artist: Vyacheslav Schwarz
- Year: 1865
- Medium: Cardboard glued to canvas, oil
- Dimensions: 26,5 cm × 33 cm (104 in × 13 in)
- Location: Russian Museum, Saint Petersburg

Etude of the life of the Russian Tsars (Chess playing) (Russian: Сцена из домашней жизни русских царей, also known as Chess Game, The Tsar Plays Chess, exhibited at the exhibition Russian Historical Painting in 1939 under the title Tsar Alexei Mikhailovich Playing Chess, under this name it was widely known in Soviet times and mentioned in historical monographs) (Note: In particular, under this title the picture is reproduced in the book Bokhanov A. N. Tsar Alexei Mikhailovich. M.: Veche, 2012. P. 384. (Great Historical Persons). ISBN 978-5-9533-6426-3) is a painting by the Russian artist Vyacheslav Grigoryevich Schwarz (1838–1869), created in 1865. In September of the same year, Vyacheslav Schwarz submitted three paintings to the regular exhibition of the Imperial Academy of Arts: "1) Celebration of Palm Sunday in Moscow in the half of the 17th century", "2) Soldier of the Zemstvo militia (16th century)", "3) Scene from the domestic life of the Russian tsars (half of the 17th century) — a chess game", accompanied by a petition to grant him the title of Academician after their examination, which he received.

The famous collector and art patron Nikolai Stroganov bought the painting from the artist in 1865. Throughout the 19th and 20th centuries, it was exhibited at many prestigious exhibitions. The painting is now part of the collection and permanent exhibition of the State Russian Museum in St. Petersburg.

At different times, art historians and cultural studies scholars have assessed the artist's painting differently. For example, the Soviet art historian Alla Vereshchagina wrote that the choice of these episodes instead of "the great multitude of tragic and dramatic episodes of the turbulent 17th century" was determined by the artist's limited understanding of Russian history. On the contrary, the contemporary art historian Maria Chukcheeva believes that the painting reflects the urgent needs of the 1860s, when the study of pre-Petrine life was "one of the most pressing issues" of historical scholarship. Nevertheless, art historians are unanimous in their appreciation of the artist's recreation of 17th-century everyday life; even the artist's contemporaries noted his "fine, philigran work", "remarkable diligence and fidelity" to the details of the period depicted.

== History of the painting's creation and its final destiny ==
=== Vyacheslav Schwarz's historical painting and work up to 1865 ===
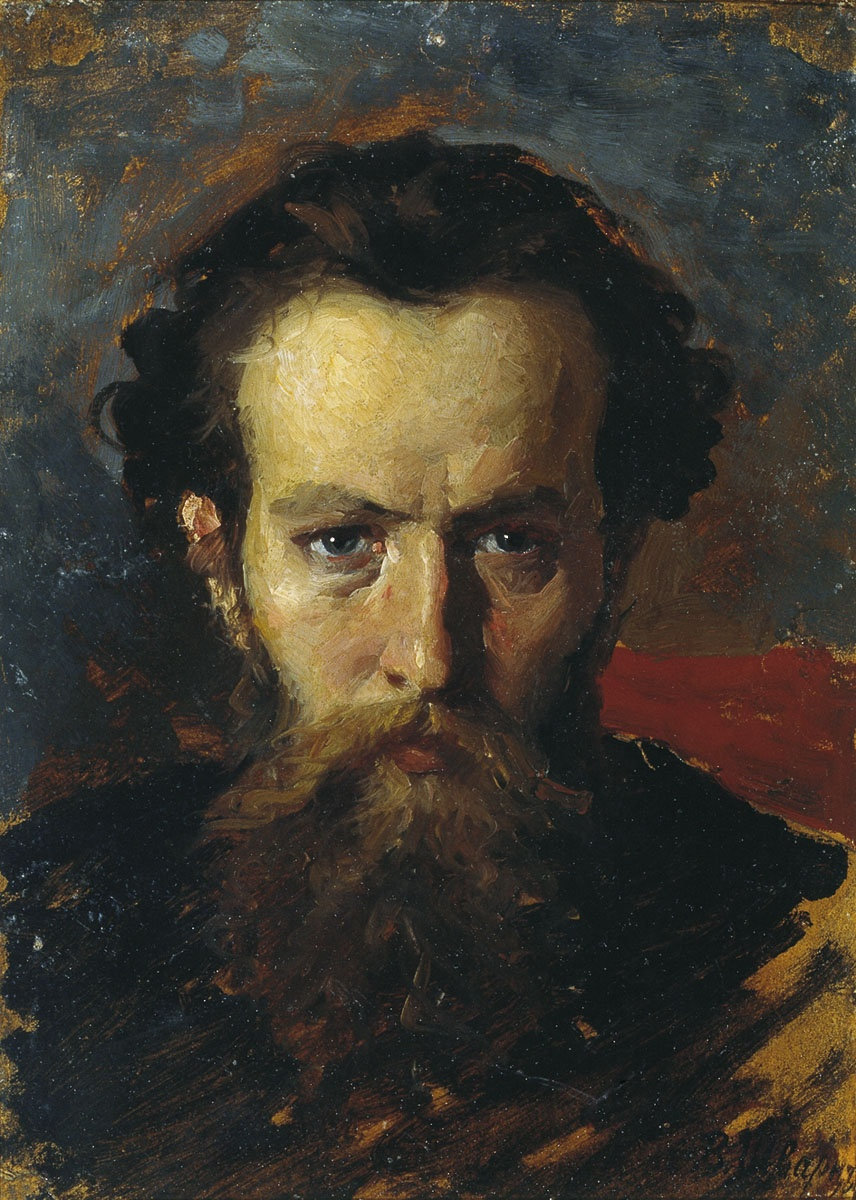
Vyacheslav Schwarz. Self-portrait, before 1869

In the 1860s, Russian society became interested in Russian history. It took a prominent place in literature (there were plays about the Times of Troubles by Alexander Ostrovsky, a trilogy by Alexei Tolstoy...), numerous publications by great historical scholars in the magazines Sovremennik and Otechestvennye Zapiski. At the same time, the opera Boris Godunov was conceived by Modest Mussorgsky. The interest in the past was largely due to the liberal reforms of Alexander II in the 1860s. The prevailing academic trend in history painting was unable to satisfy the demands of society, and its works seemed to contemporaries far removed from real life, becoming symbols of reaction or stagnation. The leading genre of Russian fine art became the genre art, with its topical themes and denunciatory character. The demands of public opinion for the renewal of the idea of history in Russian painting were formulated by the realist artist Ivan Kramskoy, the leader of the Petersburg Artists' Union and the Society for Travelling Art Exhibitions: Russia needs a historical artist "who will speak to the world in an understandable language to all peoples... an artist who will sense the historical moment in people's current lives".

By the time he made Etude on the Life of the Russian Tsars (Chess Game), Vyacheslav Schwarz had decided to give up his studies at the Imperial Academy of Arts (this happened in 1863). After receiving the second and then the first silver medal for painting, he was awarded the title of artist of the third class. He had already stopped working in the military art, which he had started with, and concentrated on the historical genre, which brought him fame. Vyacheslav Schwarz made two long training trips abroad, where he studied in the workshops of famous masters of the history genre — to Germany (where he studied at the school of Julius Schrader, and for a short time was fascinated by the work of Wilhelm von Kaulbach); During the four months of his journey, he visited Berlin, Dresden, Cologne, Frankfurt am Main, Augsburg, Karlsruhe, Darmstadt) and France (on behalf of the Empress Maria Alexandrovna, the artist had to compile and publish illustrations for Alexei Tolstoy's historical novel Prince Serebrenni, In addition to the cities of fragmented Germany, he visited Antwerp, Brussels and Paris, lived for a long time in the village of Barbizon, the young painter was greatly impressed by the work of Jean-Louis-Ernest Meissonier). Vyacheslav Schwarz's meeting with the music and art critic Vladimir Stasov, who led the realist trend in Russian culture, was of serious importance for the development of the artist's views on art.

At the same time as studying at the Imperial Academy of Arts, Schwarz attended classes at the Faculty of History and Philology of Saint Petersburg State University as a free student. Here he met Nikolai Kostomarov, a corresponding member of the Russian Academy of Sciences and one of the most important historians of the time. Kostomarov's lectures and communication with him gave direction to the artist's search for historical painting. As a result, the artist showed him his works while they were still in the sketching stage. (Note: Chukcheeva interprets the problem differently: "Nothing is known about Shvarts's reaction to these lectures, but we can assume that the ethnographic approach to the study of Russian history may have interested the artist".) As a sign of the artist's merits in the study and depiction of everyday life of past epochs, the Imperial Archaeological Commission elected him a full member in January 1865. In the same year, the Moscow Archaeological Society also elected him a full member.

=== The painting creation, its evaluation by contemporaries and final destiny ===
Several of the artist's biographers report that in 1865 the Imperial Academy of Arts awarded Vyacheslav Schwarz the title of Academician of Historical Painting for his painting Palm Sunday at the Time of Alexei Mikhailovich, after which the artist created a number of paintings on subjects from the everyday life of the 17th century. Among these paintings was the painting Etude on the Life of the Russian Tsars (Chess Game). In 2013, the original text of Schwarz's "petition" to the Council of the Academy of Arts was published for the first time, in which he reported that he was submitting three paintings for the title of Academician on the basis of the totality of these works. Among them was Scene from the Etude on the Life of the Russian Tsars:

To the Council of the Academy of Arts... I submit the following paintings for this year's academic exhibition: 1) The Celebration of Palm Sunday in Moscow in the Middle of the 17th Century, 2) A Soldier of the Zemstvo Militia (16th Century), 3) Etude of the life of the Russian Tsars (Chess playing). Please consider the paintings and if the Council finds them worthy, accept me as an academician...

Vyacheslav Schwarz studied two periods of Russian history and the two most important personalities of these periods: the reign of Ivan the Terrible and the reign of Alexei Mikhailovich. In the last period of his life (1865–1868) he concentrated entirely on the second epoch. In February 1865, the artist first mentioned the title of the painting Etude of the life of the Russian Tsars (Chess playing) in one of his letters to his father. (Note: The letter, written by Schwarz on 6 February 1865, is preserved in the collection of the Manuscripts Department of the State Tretyakov Gallery, No. 79 / 275.) The artist reported: "Today I am writing a scene from the domestic life of the Russian Tsars. The painting will soon be finished and put on permanent display".

The painting Etude of the life of the Russian Tsars (Chess playing) depicts Tsar Alexei Mikhailovich playing chess with a boyar. Its technique is cardboard on canvas, oil. The size of the canvas is 26.5 × 33 centimetres. It was first shown to the public at an exhibition at the Imperial Academy of Arts in 1865, together with two other paintings by the artist: The Celebration of Palm Sunday in Moscow under Patriarch Nikon and A Soldier of the Zemstvo Militia of the 16th Century. The artist was worried about the reception of the painting by the general public, as he understood that it was far from the critical paintings that made a positive impression on democratically minded journalists and the public at that time. He was particularly disturbed by the painting's proximity to the typically academic works of other artists on display. He wrote to his father: "I am expecting a terrible rugotnya from the journals, especially as this year Maenad and Aphrodite have appeared again, with and without tambourines". Alla Vereshchagina, in her monograph on the artist's work, claimed that critics were indifferent to Schwarz's paintings: there was neither strong condemnation nor admiration. The exhibition itself was heavily criticised in the press. The magazine Sovremennik criticised the artist Fyodor Bronnikov for his historical and everyday paintings of Ancient Rome, and according to Vereshchagina, Schwarz could not help but attribute the negative reviews of his work to his own paintings. All this, according to the Soviet art historian, made Vyacheslav Schwarz "rethink his art".

There were also positive reviews of the painting in the press, usually referring to the artist's skilful recreation of 17th-century everyday life. Vladimir Stasov wrote in Sankt-Peterburgskie Vedomosti newspaper that "good pictures by Mr. Mikhail Schwarz from old Russian everyday life (Tsar Mikhail from old Russian life (Tsar Mikhail). Schwarz from the old Russian life (According Stasov, Tsar Mikhail Fyodorovich played chess with a boyar' and a mounted warrior of the 16th century) reminded him of Meissonier's "fine, filigree work". About the works by Schwarz exhibited at the Academic Exhibition in 1865, the art critic of the publication Russky invalid, who hid under the pseudonym W, wrote: Celebration of Palm Sunday in Moscow under Patriarch Nikon and Etude of the life of the Russian Tsars (Chess playing)... by Mr. Schwarz are interesting from an archaeological point of view, as the setting of ancient Russian life is conveyed in them with remarkable diligence and fidelity. An observer from the capital's Sankt-Petersburgskie Vedomosti newspaper called the scenes from the domestic life of Russian tsars in the 17th century "not uninteresting from an archaeological point of view. An anonymous critic of the newspaper Illustrirovannaya Gazeta wrote: "Schwarz has clearly restored old Russian life in three paintings: Palm Sunday under Nikon, Etude of the life of the Russian Tsars (Chess playing) and A Soldier of the Land Militia in the 16th Century. The paintings Etude of the life of the Russian Tsars (Chess playing) and Soldier of the Zemstvo Militia were highly praised by the art critic of the newspaper Vesti, writing under the initials "I", in the article Academic Exhibition and Our Critics: "So much life, truth, intelligence, that looking at them, as when listening to folk tales, one is involuntarily transported to the long past and forgotten centuries".

A famous collector and patron of the arts, the chamberlain Count Nikolai Stroganov, who hurried to buy it on the opening day of the exhibition and took it with him immediately, without waiting for the end of the exhibition, saw the painting Etude of the life of the Russian Tsars (Chess playing) at the exhibition. Surprised, the artist wrote to his sister:

...My new little picture has been sold to Count Nikolai Strogonoff, but I am very sorry that the picture was not taken in time, for it was bought and taken away on the first day of the exhibition. I have not written to you because I only received the money yesterday and I was afraid that nothing would come of the deal, but yesterday I was finally paid and now I am making a drawing for Beggrove, the art dealer. He asked me to do the drawing and assured me that he had a chance to sell it....

In 1888, the painting was presented at a large exhibition of works by Vyacheslav Schwarz, held in the halls of the Imperial Society for the Encouragement of the Arts. It is known that at that time the painting was still in the possession of Count Nikolai Stroganov. The painting was also exhibited in 1939 at the Russian Historical Painting exhibition in Moscow and in 1951 at the Exhibition of works of the second half of the 19th century (from the museum's collection) at the State Russian Museum.

The painting is currently in the collection of the State Russian Museum. The inventory number is Zh-1444. In the lower right-hand corner of the canvas is the artist's signature and the date, which he added using letters from the Greek alphabet as numbers: "V: Schwarz αωξε (1865)". The painting came into the collection of the Russian Museum in 1907 from a certain G. Z. Agafonov. (Note: According to another version, which has been adopted by the publishers of the artist's correspondence, the painting came to the Russian Museum directly from the collection of Nikolai Stroganov.)

In a monograph on the work of Vyacheslav Schwarz published in 1960, Alla Vereshchagina mentions two drawings for the painting Etude of the life of the Russian Tsars (Chess playing) (both in the collection of the Russian Museum): A Man Playing Chess (paper, graphic pencil, 30.1 x 22.7 cm, bottom right of the sketch signed by the artist V. Schwarz) and A Man Standing at a Table (paper, graphic pencil, 29.9 x 22.7 cm, sketch signed at the bottom right by the artist V. Schwarz). The drawings are not dated by the artist. Alla Vereshchagina attributed them to 1865. The editors of the artist's correspondence believe that some portrait sketches from the collection of the Kursk State Picture Gallery of A. A. Deineka "can be considered as preparatory studies of types" for the painting Etude on the Life of the Russian Tsars (Chess Game).

== The painting's representation ==
Like other genre paintings by the artist from 1865-1866, Etude of the life of the Russian Tsars (Chess playing) is a small work. Schwarz's painting has a "meticulous, almost miniature" character. The artist has depicted a small group of people and placed them in a flat interior. The few figures are all in the foreground, which Alla Vereshchagina has called "relief". The painting depicts a scene in the study of the Tsar's palace, not in his private chambers. This is indicated by the presence of a group of boyars.

The Russian Tsar Alexei Mikhailovich is depicted by the artist playing chess with one of his close boyars. The artist has succeeded in creating an atmosphere of calm, cosiness and silence. The Emperor is dressed in homely clothes. The low ceiling of the room, a huge stove, simple utensils, a cat playing with a chess piece on the floor (according to Maria Chukcheeva, "a kitten is frolicking") stand out in the interior. Nevertheless, the artist makes the viewer aware that the action is taking place in the tsar's palace: according to court etiquette, the boyar playing with Alexei Mikhailovich has no right to sit and play with the tsar. Two boyars watch the game, standing respectfully near the table and not daring to interfere with the players. Another boyar is shown in the doorway: he is leaving the room. Only the patriarch, for example, could sit in the presence of the sovereign. The domestic atmosphere of the scene is emphasised by the rather free pose of the boyar playing. He stands with one hand on the floor, wearing a feathered cloak, and leans on the table with the other.

There was some dispute as to which seventeenth-century tsar the artist was portraying. The circle of possible prototypes was narrowed down to two candidates: Mikhail Fyodorovich and Alexei Mikhailovich. Maria Chukcheeva, a contemporary art historian, suggested that this was simply a type of Russian tsar from the before Peter the Great. If a particular ruler was important to Schwarz, he would have reflected this in the title of the work.

== Tsar Alexei Mikhailovich and chess ==
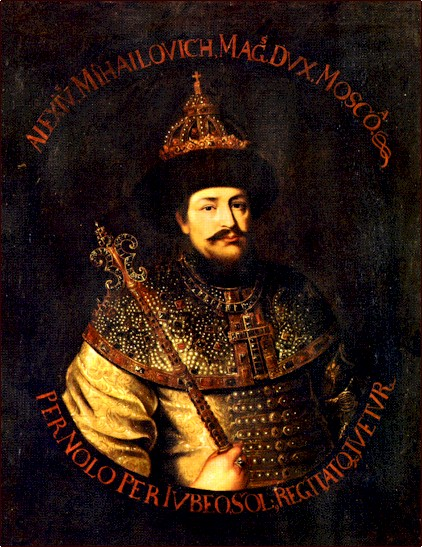
Alexei Mikhailovich, 17th century image

Alexei Mikhailovich learnt to play chess (and similar games, known today only by their names like tafl games or checkers) (Note: An attempt to describe the basic principles and characteristics of these games was made by Gali Korzukhina, a candidate of historical sciences, in a 1963 article.) at the age of about seven. Chess suited the boy's calm and prudent character. There were always several sets of chess in the Tsar's study, bought or given to the Tsar at different times. Chess was a favourite pastime of the Tsar's close circle. He taught his children to play chess from an early age. Thus, in April 1672, by order of the Tsar, two chess boards "written on gold with coloured paints" were sent to the chambers of the Tsar's son, Tsarevich Fedor. It is known that in 1676 the painter Bogdan Saltanov painted with colours, gold and silver "small chessboards" for the four-year-old younger son of the tsar — tsarevich Peter Alexeyevich. The following record indicates that chess was also used by the children of Alexei Mikhailovich as an ordinary toy:

On 2 October (1660, according to the new chronology), 12 white and black horses, chosen from various Polish chessmen, were brought to the chambers of the six-year-old heir to the throne, Alexei Alexeyevich.

In the Kremlin armoury there were special masters who were exclusively engaged in the manufacture of chess. Chess was made of ivory and fish bones (walrus tusks); chessboards were painted with colours, gold and silver, the bone pieces were covered with gold. Account books report:

On 4 January (1636) he [the tsarevich] bought wooden chessboards with boards in the vegetable row for 10 kopecks. In the same place on the 13th of January "three bone chessboards with boards" were bought. On Gen. 20 a turner of the Armoury Order finished the tsarevich's worn out white fish chessboards and made them in gold.

Alexei Mikhailovich's own silver chess sets have been preserved (Moscow Kremlin Museums). Receipts for chess sets commissioned by the tsar have also survived to our time. According to Zabelin, only three masters made chess for the tsar during the reign of Alexei Mikhailovich: Denisko Zubkov, Ivan Katerinin, Kirilko Salamatov (when the tsar was a child, chess was made for him by another master - Kirilo Kuzmin). According to foreigners, chess was played in the palace every day.

Candidate of Historical Sciences Isaac Linder in his book on the history of chess in Russia devoted a whole section to the era of Alexei Mikhailovich and the passion for the game among members of his family, quoted documents testifying to the addiction to chess of Alexei Mikhailovich's daughter from his first marriage Marfa, the names of dozens of craftsmen who were engaged in the production of chess sets at that time. In particular, he noted that in historical sources there are no statements about any differences between the rules of chess that existed in Russia and in Western Europe, from which he concluded that the innovations developed and adopted in Europe in the 15th-17th centuries, which turned chess into a more dynamic and complex game, had already spread to Russia in Alexei Mikhailovich's time.

== Soviet and Russian art historians about the painting ==
=== The painting in Alla Vereshchagina's works ===
The Soviet art historian Alla Vereshchagina has noted that this work by Vyacheslav Schwarz combines academic techniques with the artist's search for a new realist style. There are only a few actors on the canvas, they are located in the 17th century interior, which the artist has reconstructed in detail. There is a certain "sculpture" and monumentality, in keeping with academic principles. However, the artist does not emphasise the main character in the painting. The clothes of the tsar and the boyars are almost indistinguishable in colour. Although the boyar standing in front of Alexei Mikhailovich does not have the right to sit in the autocrat's presence, in Vereshchagina's opinion there is even a certain familiarity in the boyar's pose: he is standing with one hand behind the half of the feathers, and the other is leaning on the table (on the hands the artist outlined each finger with bright red paint, thanks to which the skin here looks as if it were translucent). Vereshchagina believes that Schwarz borrowed this technique, unusual for the period, from one of his French or Russian contemporaries. Art historians often attribute these features of the picture to the realist trend in Russian painting. Vereshchagina came to the conclusion that the painting Etude of the life of the Russian Tsars (Chess playing) marks the growth of the artist's skills, the development of his sense of colour and tone in comparison with the artist's earlier works. This is expressed in the refinement and harmony of the combination of colours.

In another of her works, Alla Vereshchagina noted that Schwarz tried to overcome the limitations of academicism, but failed. His emphasis is on the drawing of the subjects, which meets the requirements of the academic style. According to her, the subjects of the second plan are barely outlined with a contour line, almost without the use of colour. (Note: Alla Vereshchagina specified that when the artist outlines the subjects of the second plan with a contour, he solves the image of the first plan by means of painting.) She points out that, whereas in the academic paintings the artist draws attention to the protagonist by highlighting his clothes in bright red, in the canvas Etude of the life of the Russian Tsars (Chess playing) Schwarz uses completely different colours: the feuillet is white, the shirt pink and the trousers blue. The same colours and clothes of the enemy ruler. The researcher particularly mentioned the skill of the colourist Schwarz. The white colour of the feyazi shimmers with shades of pink, blue, yellow and grey, creating the illusion of "the living shine of silk". In the paintings of the academics on a historical subject, there was always a heroic beginning, intended to uplift the soul of the viewer. Schwarz, on the other hand, painted a genre scene in which the main character was a historical figure. According to Alla Vereshchagina, the artist's combination of high and low genres, which was considered inadmissible by academism, was the result of several factors:

- The personal life of the artist, the result of his reflections on the problems of art.
- The impact of the social atmosphere of the 1860s, which contributed to the widespread use of the domestic genre and a reassessment of its importance.
- Serious crisis in academic history painting. False pathos, characteristic of it, outlived itself and 'sounded false'.

Vyacheslav Schwarz was distinguished by his detailed study of the old Russian way of life. Alla Vereshchagina noted that he did not try to copy the techniques of 17th-century artists, but focused on what was specific to the everyday life of the period and bore the imprint of its tastes. According to a contemporary:

...Whenever Schwarz was in Moscow, he spent many hours in the Armoury Chamber, and every time he was amazed ... ... that when he returned home he would draw for his memory all the objects of Russian antiquity, furniture, utensils, weapons and costumes, that had particularly struck him in the armoury chamber, and this with extraordinary fidelity, not only in the general outlines, but also in the details of ornamentation and all sorts of artistic features: so vast was his memory, and so intently did he scrutinise with his eyes the objects that interested him....

According to art historians, the artist's desire to correspond to the period in the smallest detail often led to fractional and overloaded drawing in his paintings, especially in the depiction of objects in the background. In the painting Etude on the Life of the Russian Tsars (Chess Game). However, Alla Vereshchagina noted that the foreground was painted with freedom and skill...

Alla Vereshchagina wrote that Schwarz' approach to the past was different from that of another contemporary Russian historical artist, Alexander Beydeman. Beidemann tried to reflect in his works the peculiarities of the fine art of the epoch he was reflecting. In his depictions of the Russian Middle Ages he changed the proportions of the body, enlarged the eyes, lengthened the figures, made the legs of the figures thinner — he used the techniques of the icon painters of that period. Vereshchagina considered the works of Schwarz and Beidemann as two special trends in Russian historical painting of the 1860s, and contrasted the works of both artists with those of the academicians.

On Alexei Mikhailovich the artist painted a white feathered coat (the artist tried to convey in the white colour of the feathered coat the variety of shades of pink, blue, yellow and grey, in order to show in their combination the lively shine of white silk), a pink shirt, blue trousers (the Boyar wore similar clothes). Vereshchagina noted that the artist, while correctly depicting the cut of the clothes, had chosen the wrong colours for them (they are too "refined and pampered" for the period). The colouring of the clothes and furnishings does not correspond to either the 17th or the 16th century. She believed that this could not be blamed on the artist, since in the sixties of the 19th century the monumental and decorative art of Russia was hidden from contemporaries under later records. Schwarz studied only the few monuments of Old Russian art available to him and known at the time, trying to understand their rhythmic and colour structure.

=== The painting in other Soviet art historians' works ===
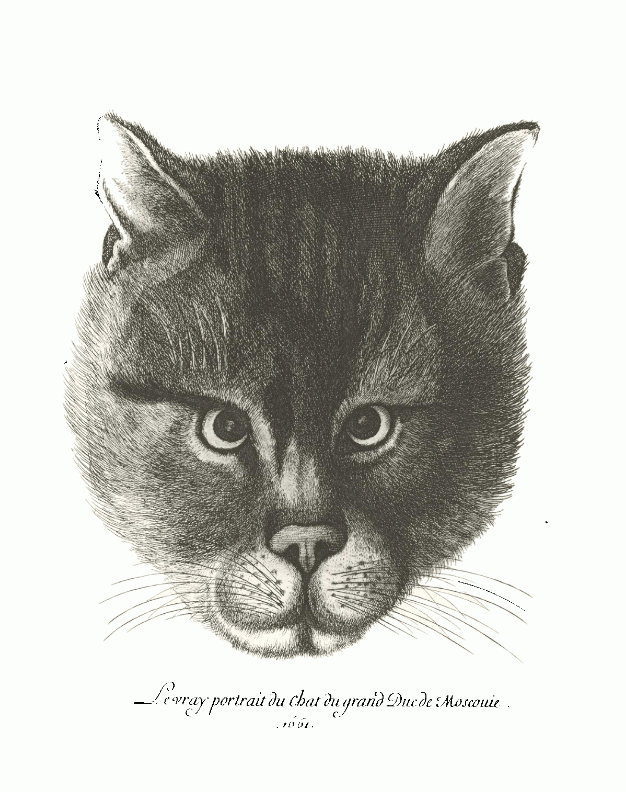
Wenceslaus Hollar. An authentic portrait of the Grand Duke of Muscovy's cat, 1661. Engraving in the collection of D. A. Rovinsky. № 2110

The Soviet art historian Sofia Goldstein noted that Schwarz did not try to use a complex plot in the composition of Etude on the Life of the Russian Tsars (Chess Game). She insisted that this painting bears a resemblance to the works of the Russian historian Ivan Zabelin, who was a contemporary of the artist, not only because of the coincidence of the names of the artwork and the scientific study, but also because the painting is "a typical example of the eventless genre". Vyacheslav Schwarz was interested in history not as a record of important events, but as a portrayal of everyday life, "even in those cases where it tells of life in the royal courts".

Goldstein noted Schwarz's interest in the specific details of bygone everyday life, which make it possible to feel the uniqueness of the way of life and psychology of a person of another era. The historical science of the time was developing in the same direction. In 1862 (three years before the painting was created) the first part of Ivan Zabelin's book Household Life of Russian Tsars in the 16th-17th Centuries was published, and later — Household Life of Russian Tsarits in the 16th-17th Centuries. In the same year, 1862, Sketches of Domestic Life and Manners of the Great Russian People in the 16th-17th Centuries appeared by Mykola Kostomarov. In 1865 (at the same time as the painting), a book by Pavel Savvaitov was published, devoted to ancient utensils and clothing. Goldstein believes that against the background of the general picture of scientific and artistic interests of the period, Schwarz' works, such as Etude on the Life of the Russian Tsars, appear as a natural stage in the development of the fine arts of his time.

Schwarz works with ethnographical precision. The pattern on the woven tablecloth, the carved ornaments on the stove, the armchair and the stools correspond to the artistic characteristics of his period. The combination of seriousness and parodic distance is characteristic of Vyacheslav Schwarz' painting. A characteristic element of parody is the cat playing at the table[59]. There is an engraving by Wenceslaus Hollar (probably based on the original by the Dutch artist Frederick de Moucheron) — probably a portrait of the favourite pet cat of the tsar Alexei Mikhailovich (1663) under the title An authentic Portrait of the Cat of the Grand Duke of Moscow.

=== Contemporary Russian art historians about the painting ===
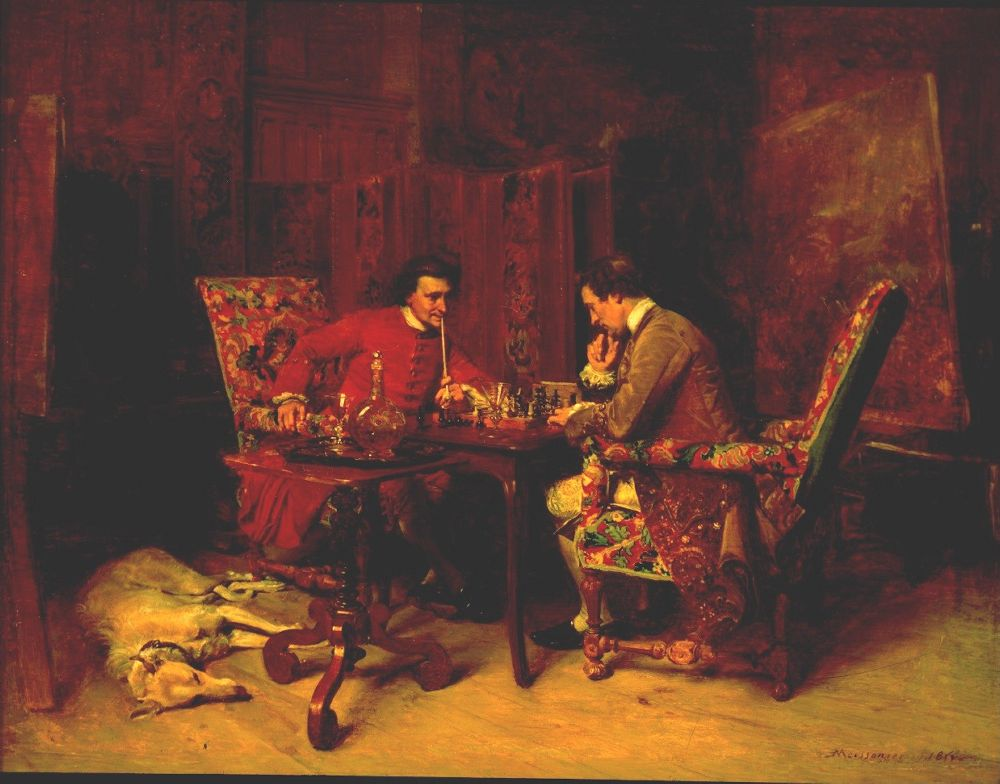
Jean-Louis- Ernest Meissonier. A game of chess, 1858

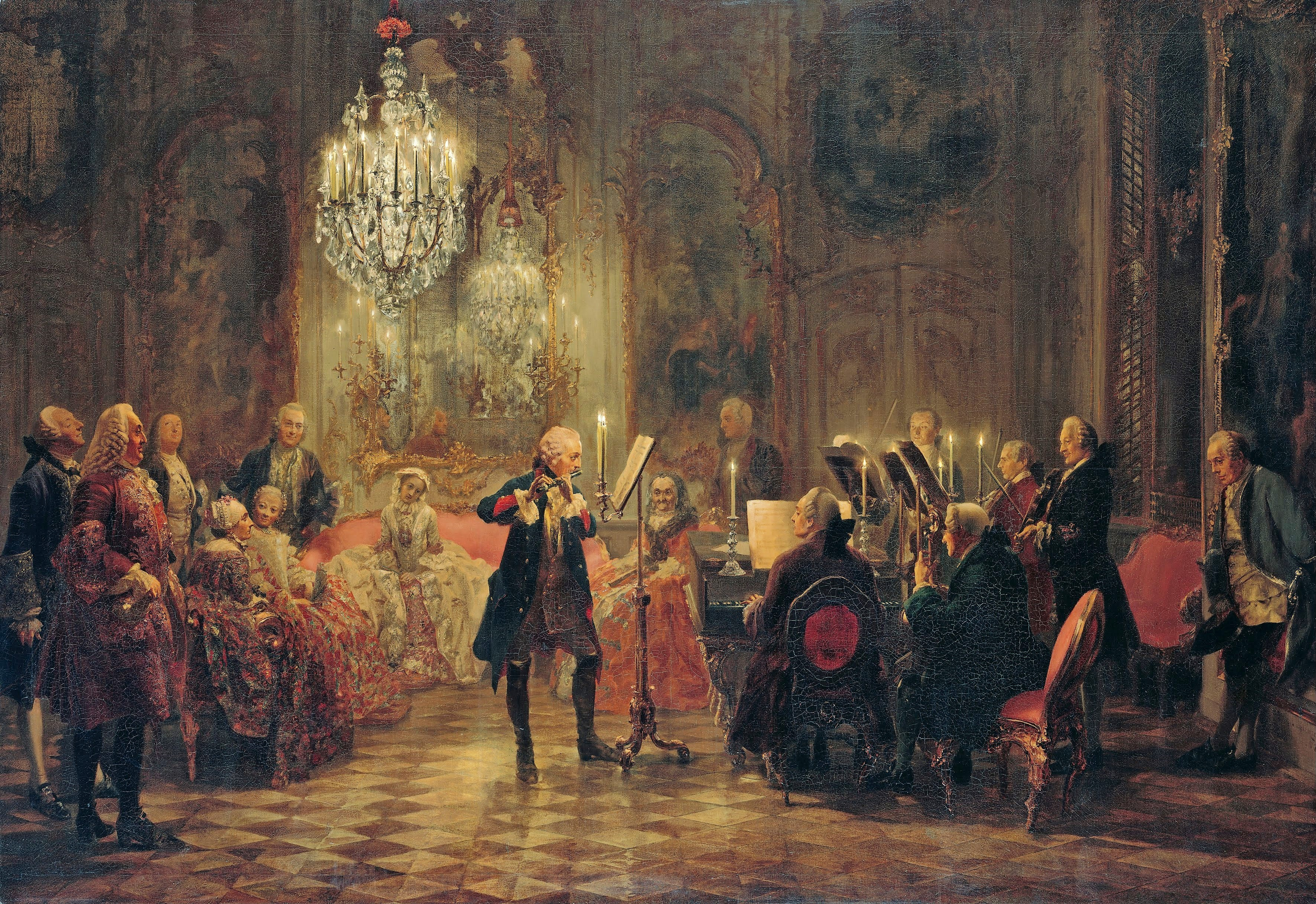
Adolf von Menzel. Flute Concerto for Frederick the Great at Sans Souci, 1850-1852

Contemporary Russian art historian Nonna Yakovleva noted the small size of the painting, the balanced composition, the enclosed space of the cosy upper room and the soft, warm colours. She describes the artist's technique as "almost miniature". According to the art historian, Schwarz succeeded in creating an atmosphere of "calm and domestic ordinariness". He showed viewers the private lives of ordinary people in the 17th century. However, one detail —a boyar playing chess in front of a seated opponent— suggests that the canvas depicts a royal person.

Ekaterina Amfilokhieva, a senior researcher at the State Russian Museum, insisted that the uniqueness of the painting Etude on the Life of the Russian Tsars (Chess Game) lies in the combination of historical and everyday genres. This combination of "high", in the sense of the theory of classicism, historical genre, and "low" (daily) was a new word for the 1860s. If the viewer did not determine that the picture was of Tsar Alexei Mikhailovich, he would have the illusion that the canvas belonged to the domestic genre.

Maria Chukcheeva, a contemporary Russian art historian, has attempted to explain Schwarz's choice of chess for the painting. In her view, two factors contributed to this:

- In the historical works of Russian scholars devoted to life before Peter the Great period, it was noted that the game of chess was widespread among all classes of Russian society: from peasants to the royal family.
- The chess representation was popular in European art of the time.

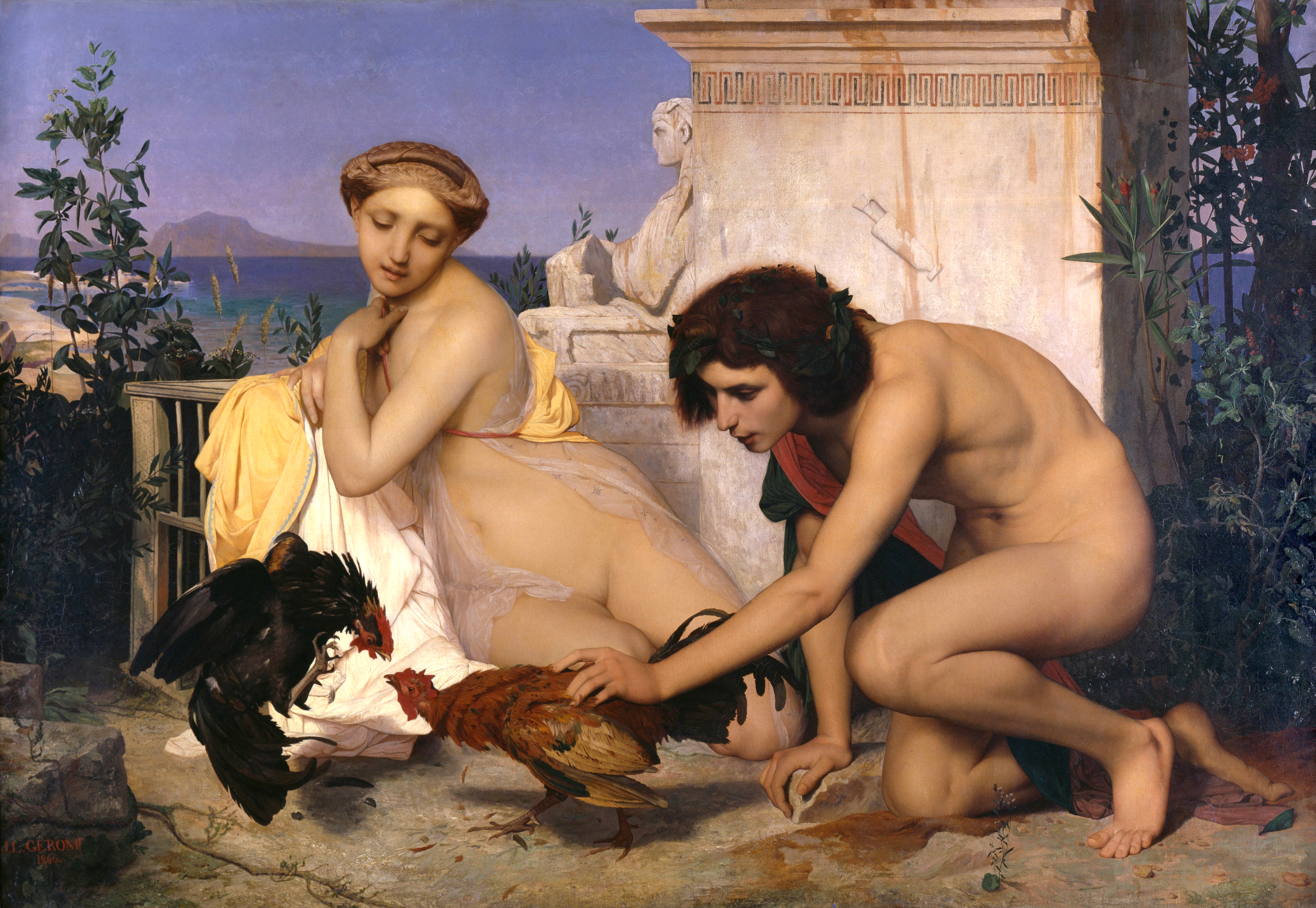
Jean-Léon Gérôme. Young Greeks amusing themselves with cockfighting, 1846

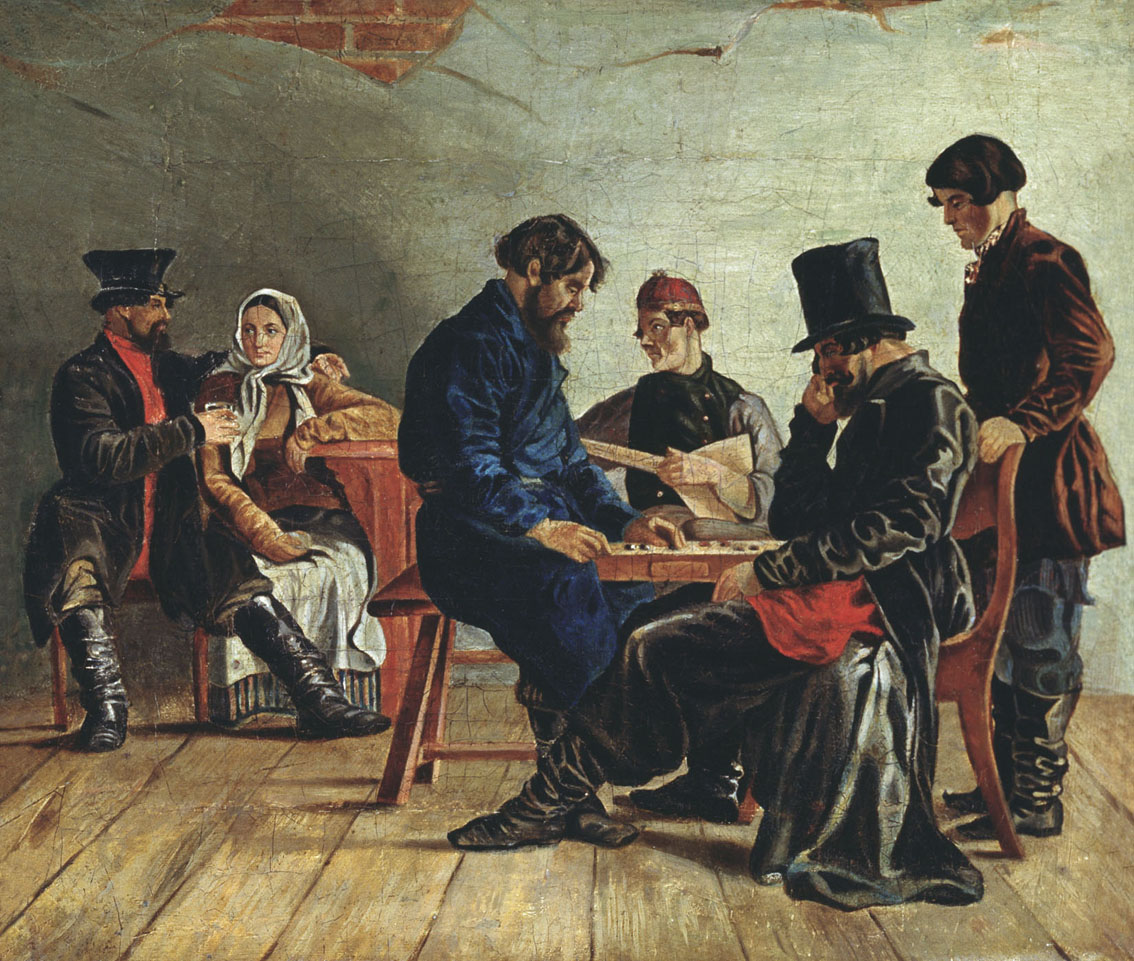
Ignatius Schedrovsky. A game of draughts, mid-19th century

Maria Chukcheeva pointed out that although Schwarz's painting appeared almost simultaneously with Nikolai Kostomarov's and Ivan Zabelin's works on the history before Peter the Great period, the artist had long been interested in the everyday life of the period. From her point of view, it is impossible to conclude that Zabelin's book became the main source for the painting simply because of the coincidence of their titles. Chukcheeva writes that in European art at that time there were many scenes depicting chess or card games in the home, in a tavern or even on the street. Several paintings on the subject were done by Jean-Louis-Ernest Meissonier, whose work Schwarz became familiar with during a long trip to France. Chukcheeva writes that it is impossible to say exactly which of Meissonier's chess paintings were known to the Russian artist. From their point of view, however, the compositional similarity of Schwarz's painting to the chess scenes of the French artist and his imitators is undeniable. Another source of inspiration for Schwarz could have been the paintings of the private lives of prominent rulers, which became widespread in European art in the 1840s and 1850s. To this group, the art historian attributes the paintings of Jean-Léon Gérôme and the forgotten Jean-Egissippe Vetter, which the Russian painter saw at the Paris Salon in 1863.

She considers Adolf von Menzel's scenes from Frederick the Great's domestic life (such as Frederick the Great Playing the Flute at Sanssouci, Round Table in Sanssouci and others) to be closest to Schwarz's painting. Originally painted in 1840 as illustrations for Franz Theodor Kugler's History of Frederick the Great, they became independent canvases in the 1850s. These paintings coincided with the era of liberalisation in Germany and portrayed the king as 'a philosopher who loves music, science and art, and in his leisure time enjoys lively conversation with his learned friends'. Schwarz was familiar with Menzel's illustrations and, according to Chukcheeva, took them into account when creating the painting Etude of the life of the Russian Tsars (Chess playing). The artist may have been familiar with Russian paintings and prints depicting players of chess, draughts and cards. Among them is Ignaty Shchedrovsky's Game of Checkers, "the right part of which is compositionally close" to Schwarz's painting.

== Bibliography ==
=== Sources ===
- Stasov, V. S. (1865). Ещё о нынешней выставке [More about the current exhibition] (in Russian). Санкт-Петербургские ведомости Газета. pp. 1–2.
- Вячеслав Григорьевич Шварц: переписка, 1838—1869: к 175–летию со дня рождения [Vyacheslav Grigorievich Shvarts: Correspondence, 1838-1869: 175th anniversary of his birth] (PDF) (in Russian). Курск: ПОЛСТАР. 2013. p. 180. ISBN 978-5-906415-05-9
- I. (1865). "Академическая выставка и наши критики" [The Academic Exhibition and our critics] (in Russian). No. 4 November (№ 18). Весть.

=== Researches and non-fiction sources ===
- Amfilokhieva, Е. V. (2017). Изобразительное искусство. Мастера и шедевры [Fine Art. Masters and masterpieces] (in Russian). М.: Эксмо. p. 64. ISBN 9-785-4576-1183-2.
- Bulgakov, F. I. (1890). Шварц Вячеслав Григорьевич // Наши художники (живописцы, скульпторы, мозаичисты, гравёры, медальеры) на академических выставках последнего 25-летия. Биографии, портреты художников и снимки с их произведений [Shwartz Vyacheslav Grigorievich // Our artists (painters, sculptors, mosaicists, engravers, medalists) at the academic exhibitions of the last 25 years. Biographies, portraits of artists and photos of their works] (in Russian). Vol. 2. Л—Я (СПб. ed.). Издательство А. С. Суворина. pp. 249–254.
- Vereschagina, А. G. (1960). В. Г. Шварц [V. G. Schwartz] (in Russian) (Л. ed.). Искусство. p. 170.
- Vereschagina, А. G. (1990). "IV. Поиски новых выразительных средств". Историческая картина в русском искусстве. Шестидесятые годы XIX века [Historical painting in Russian art. Sixties of the XIX century] (in Russian). Vol. 2. М.: Искусство. pp. 152–211. ISBN 5-210-00311-6.
- Goldstein S. N., Lyasovskaya O. A. (1965). Историческая живопись (раздел о Вячеславе Шварце написан С. Гольдштейн) // История русского искусства в 13 томах [Historical painting (the section on Vyacheslav Schwartz was written by S. Goldstein)] (in Russian). Vol. IX. Book II. М.: Наука. pp. 143–176.
- Государственный Русский музей. Живопись, XVIII — начало XX века. Каталог [State Russian Museum. Painting, XVIII - early XX centuries. Catalogue] (in Russian). Л.: Аврора, Искусство. 1980. p. 346.
- Zabelin, I. E. (2014). Домашний быт русских царей в XVI и XVII столетиях [Household life of Russian tsars in the XVI and XVII centuries] (PDF). Русская этнография (in Russian). М.: Институт русской цивилизации. p. 1056. ISBN 978-5-4261-0055-8. Archived from the original (PDF) on 2020-03-31.
- Korzukhina, G. F. (1963). "Из истории игр на Руси" [From the history of games in Russia]. Soviet archeologia (in Russian) (4). Russia: Nauka: 85–103.
- Linder, I. M. (1964). В Московском государстве // Шахматы на Руси [In the Moscow State // Chess in Russia]. Из истории мировой культуры (in Russian). М.: Наука. pp. 105–137.
- Наследие семьи Шварц: [каталог выставки]: к 170-летию Вячеслава Григорьевича Шварца [The Schwarts Family Legacy: [Exhibition catalogue]: 170th anniversary of Vyacheslav Grigorievich Shvarts] (in Russian). Курск: ПОЛСТАР. 2008. ISBN 978-5-98913-011-5.
- Taranushenko, S. (2013) [1946]. Вячеслав Григорьевич Шварц [Vyacheslav Grigorievich Schwartz] (PDF) (in Russian). Курск: Курская правда. pp. 13–37. ISBN 978-5-906415-05-9.
- Tolstoy, V. P. (1947). Вячеслав Григорьевич Шварц (1838—1868) [Vyacheslav Grigorievich Schwartz (1838–1868)] (in Russian). М.— Л.: Искусство. p. 24.
- Chernaya, L. B. (2013). Повседневная жизнь московских государей в XVII веке [Daily life of Moscow sovereigns in the 17th century]. Живая история: Повседневная жизнь человечества (in Russian). М.: Молодая гвардия. p. 413. ISBN 978-5-235-03648-2.
- Chukcheeva, М. А. (2019). Образ допетровской Руси в творчестве В. Г. Шварца и историко-бытовая концепция в русской исторической науке 1860-х гг [The image of Russia before Peter the Great in the work of V. G. Schwartz and the historical and everyday life concept in Russian historical science of the 1860s] (in Russian). Известия Уральского федерального университета. Серия 2 :Гуманитарные науки: Журнал. pp. 76–91.
- Chukcheeva, М. А. (2017). "Формирование исторического жанра в России в 1860-е годы и творчество В. Г. Шварца" [Formation of the historical genre in Russia in the 1860s and the work of V. G. Schwartz]. Художественная культура (in Russian). No. 1 (19). ISSN 2226-0072.
- Yakovleva, N. А. (2005). Историческая картина в русской живописи [Historical painting in Russian painting]. Энциклопедия мирового искусства (in Russian). М.: Белый город. p. 656. ISBN 9-785-0401-1037-7.
- Σφήκας, Ν. (2007). Ζωγραφικά έργα µε θέµα το Σκάκι από τον δέκατο πέµπτο έως τον εικοστό αιώνα [Paintings on the theme of Chess from the fifteenth to the twentieth century] (in Greek). Θεσσαλονίκη: Αριστοτέλειο Πανεπιστήµιο Θεσσαλονίκης. p. 298.
