= Vyacheslav Schwarz =

Russian painter

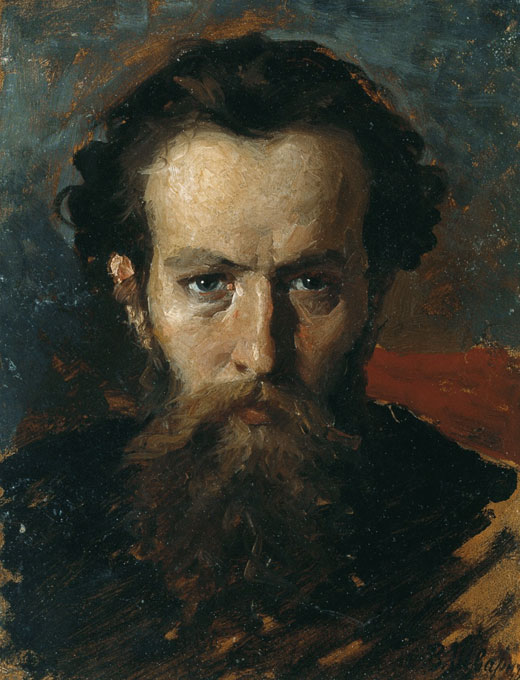
Self-Portrait, late 1860s, oil on paper mounted on cardboard; Art Museum of Belarus, Minsk

Vyacheslav Grigorevich Schwarz, or Shvarts (Russian: Вячеслав Григорьевич Шварц; 4 October 1838 — 10 April 1869) was a Russian painter, active in St. Petersburg and his native Kursk Governorate during Tsar Alexander II's reign, best known for his pictures of pre-Petrine Russia.

== Biography ==
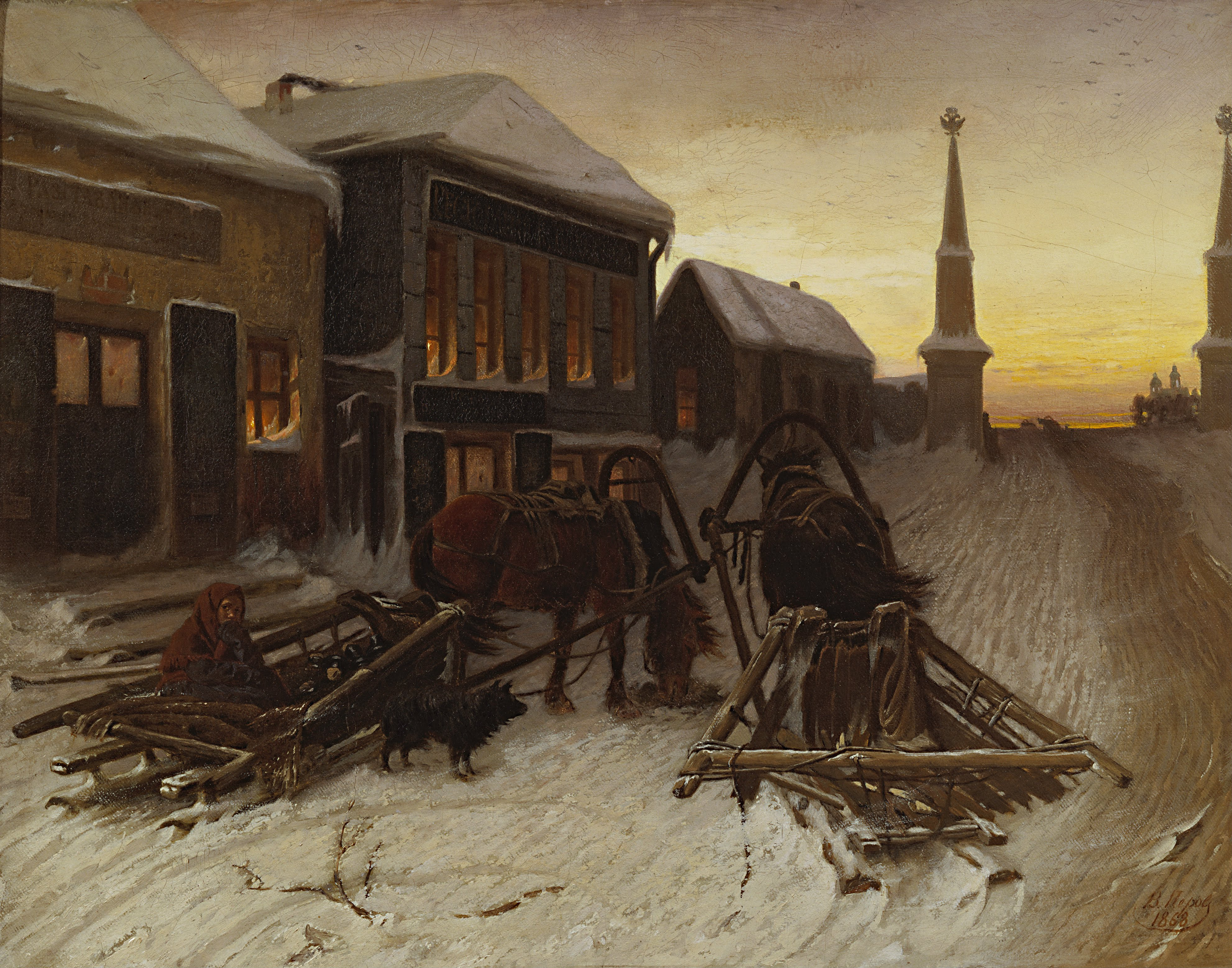
The Last Tavern at the City Gates

Born in Kursk to a Russian family, paternally he was also of Danish ancestry. His father, Grigory Yefimovich Schwarz, was an Imperial Lieutenant General who made his recognition during the Napoleonic Wars and later in Caucasus, where he served as chief of the Jaro-Belokany Military District in Zakatali Okrug, where Vyacheslav spent his childhood.

In 1846, he and his mother moved to Moscow, where he received his first art lessons at the Moscow School of Drawing. The following year, he was granted admission to the Page Corps, but never served because his mother didn't want him to have a military career. He was finally brought to Saint Petersburg in 1851 and was enrolled in the Imperial Alexander Lyceum the following year. He was also a talented linguist, having acquired a working knowledge of French, German and English by the age of ten.

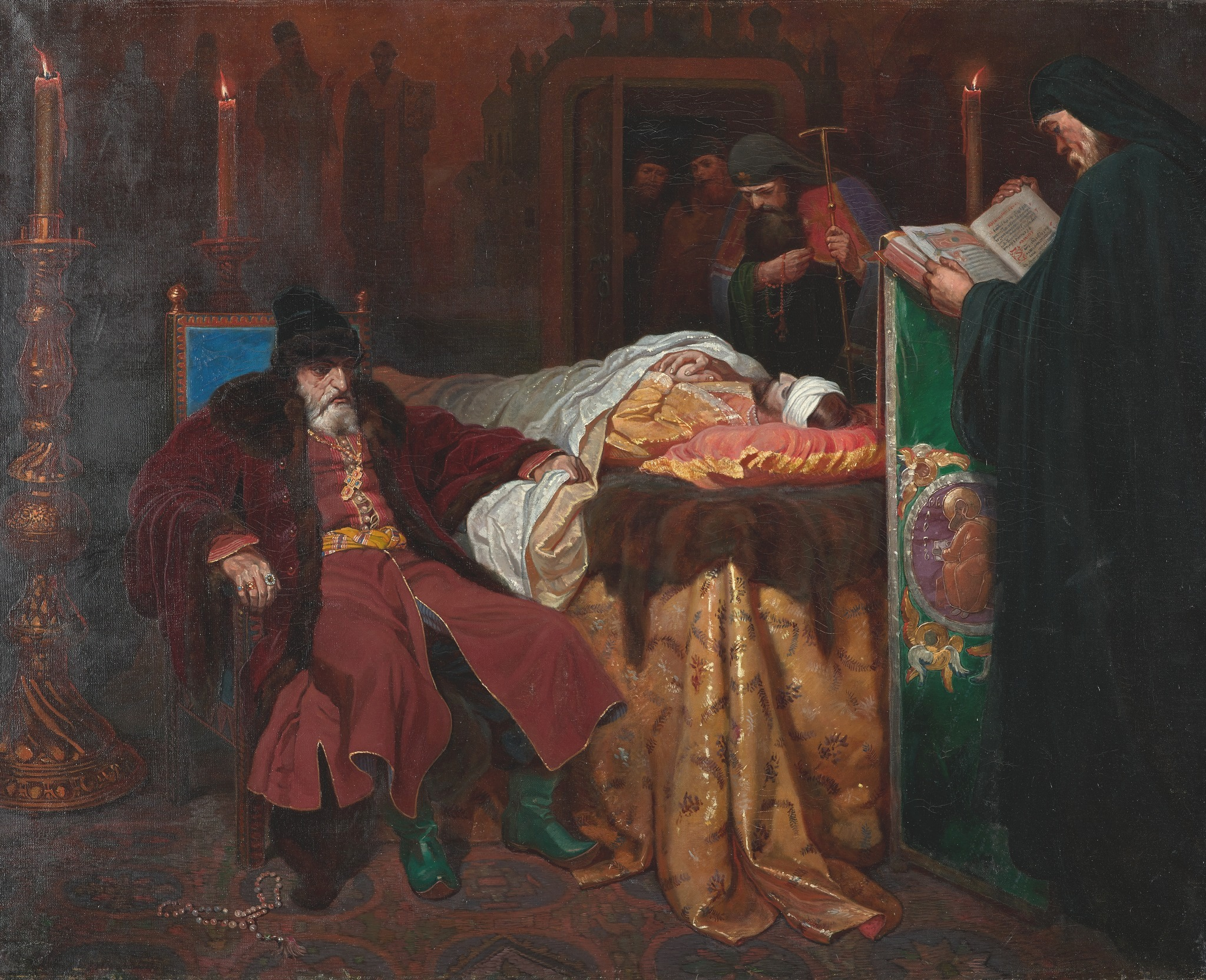
Ivan the Terrible by the body of his son, who he has murdered (1864)

While at the Lyceum, his drawings attracted the attention of the art faculty and he was able to study under Arseny Meshchersky, who introduced him to oil painting. In 1859, he was graduated with a gold medal and the rank of "Class IX" in the Civil Service. Later that year, he was given permission to audit classes at Saint Petersburg Imperial University, where he came under the influence of Nikolay Kostomarov. He had already begun attending classes at the Imperial Academy of Arts, to study military art with Bogdan Willewalde but, fascinated with Professor Kostomarov's lectures, his first paintings were devoted to ancient Russian history.

=== Travel abroad ===
In 1861, he spent six months abroad, primarily in Berlin, where he honed his skills with Wilhelm von Kaulbach and Julius Schrader. Upon returning, he presented his painting of Ivan the Terrible with the body his murdered son and was disappointed to receive only a silver medal. The following year, he created illustrations for The Song of the Merchant Kalashnikov by Lermontov and Prince Serebrenni by A. K. Tolstoy.

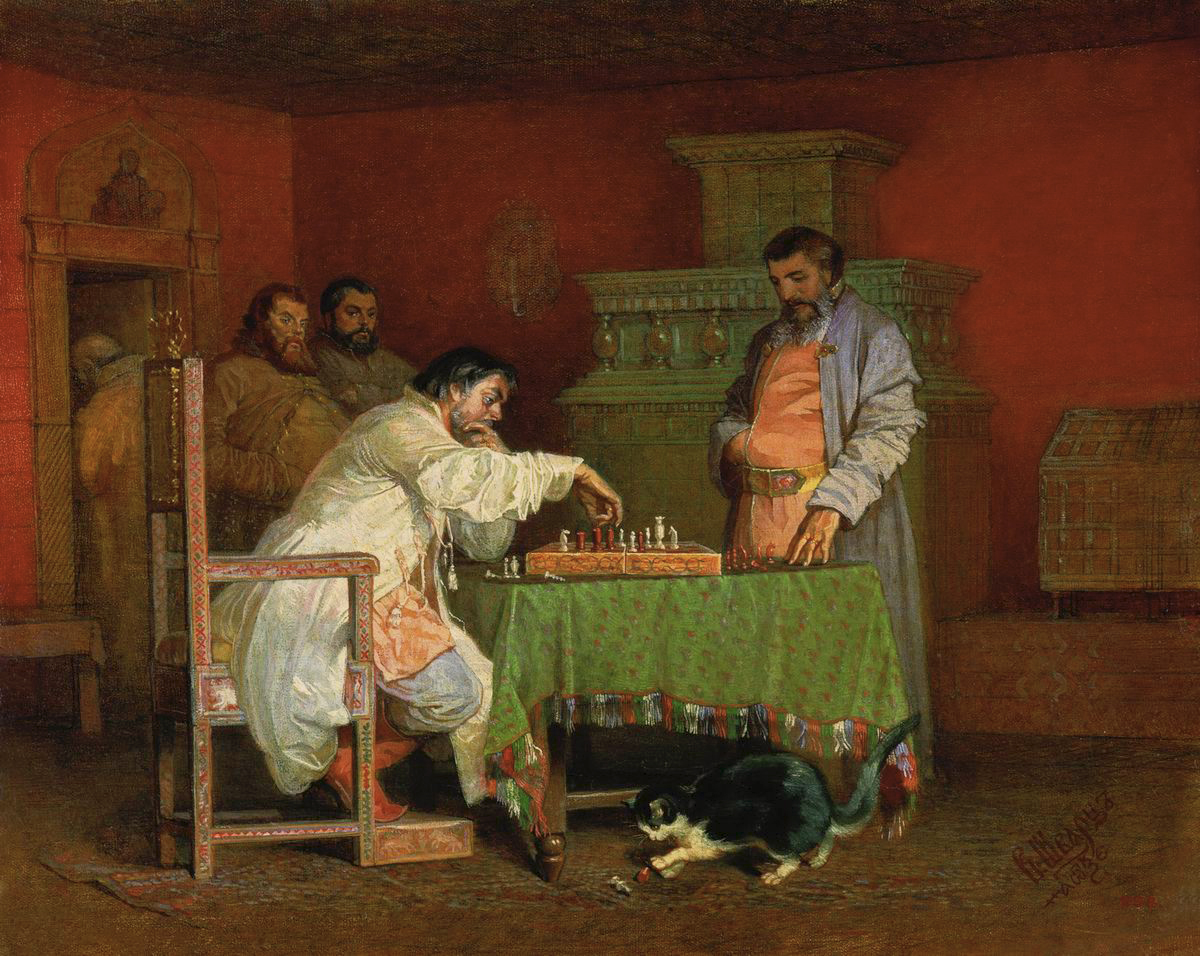
Tsar Alexis I playing chess (1865)

His desire to see more European art induced him to resign from the service in 1863 and embark on another trip, finishing in Paris, where he worked with Jules Lefebvre and made many sketches from life. He gave up plans to visit Italy and returned to Russia in 1864, submitting a new version of his painting of Ivan the Terrible, only to receive another silver medal. He lived in Ryazan for much of 1865, then presented his painting of “Palm Sunday in the days of Alexis I“, for which he was named an Academician.

At the beginning of 1867, he made his third trip abroad, to Paris, on behalf of the academy, to help prepare the Russian exhibit at the International Exposition, where he acquired several medals. He also took some time for further studies, with Meissonier. During his trip back to Russia, he stopped in Weimar for two months to participate in a production of The Death of Ivan the Terrible.

=== Illness and death ===
Having suffered from abdominal pains during his trip, he saw a doctor and was diagnosed with Addison's disease. By the middle of 1868 he was finding it difficult to continue working. Some of what would be his last completed works earned him the status of Honorary Free Member at the academy.

Feeling somewhat improved towards the end of that year, he returned to Kursk to live with his father, in hopes that the country air and peaceful atmosphere would assist his recovery. To the contrary, his health deteriorated and he died in March 1869. He was buried at his father's estate in the nearby village of White Well.

== More selected paintings ==
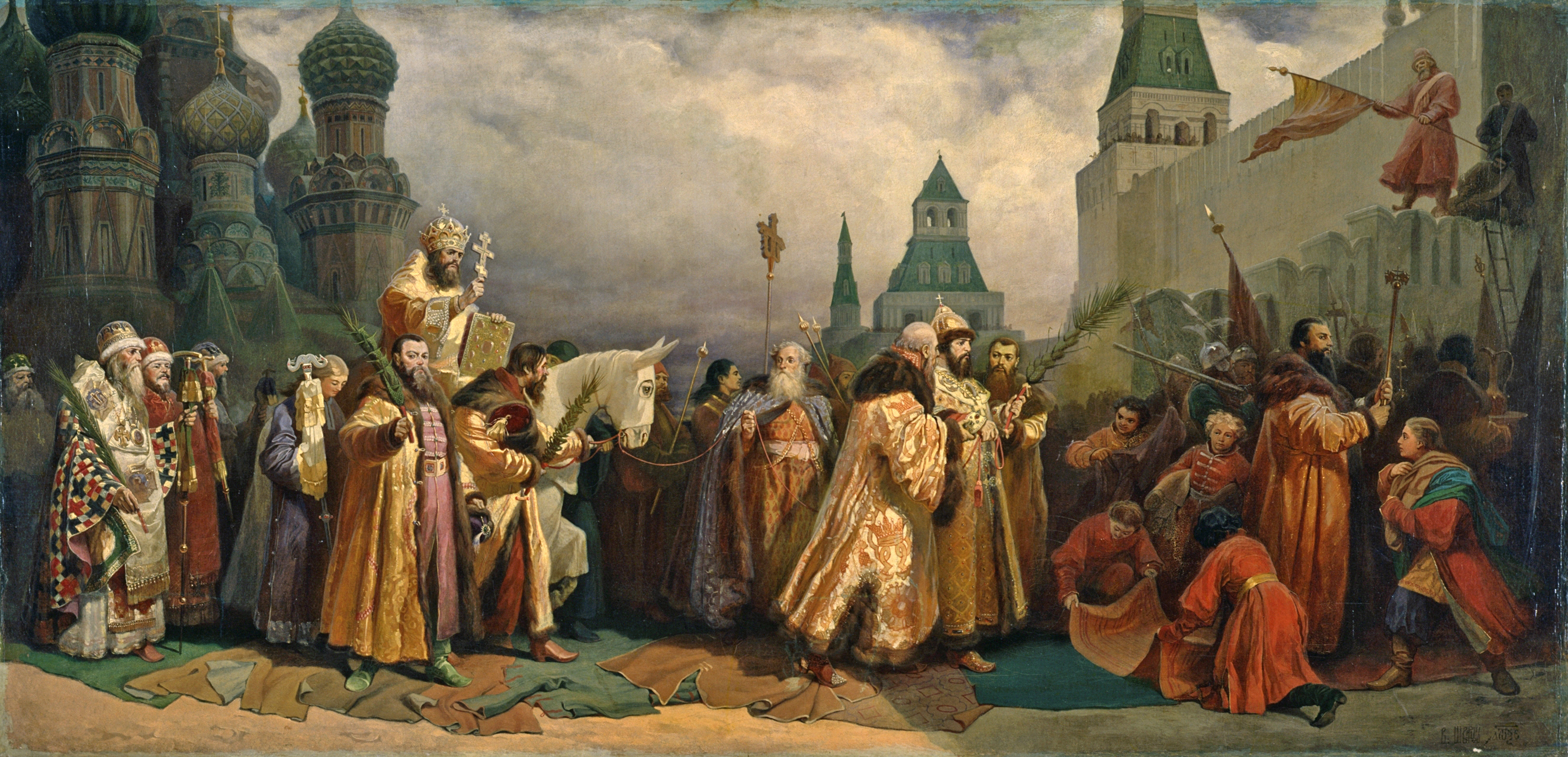
Palm Sunday in Moscow

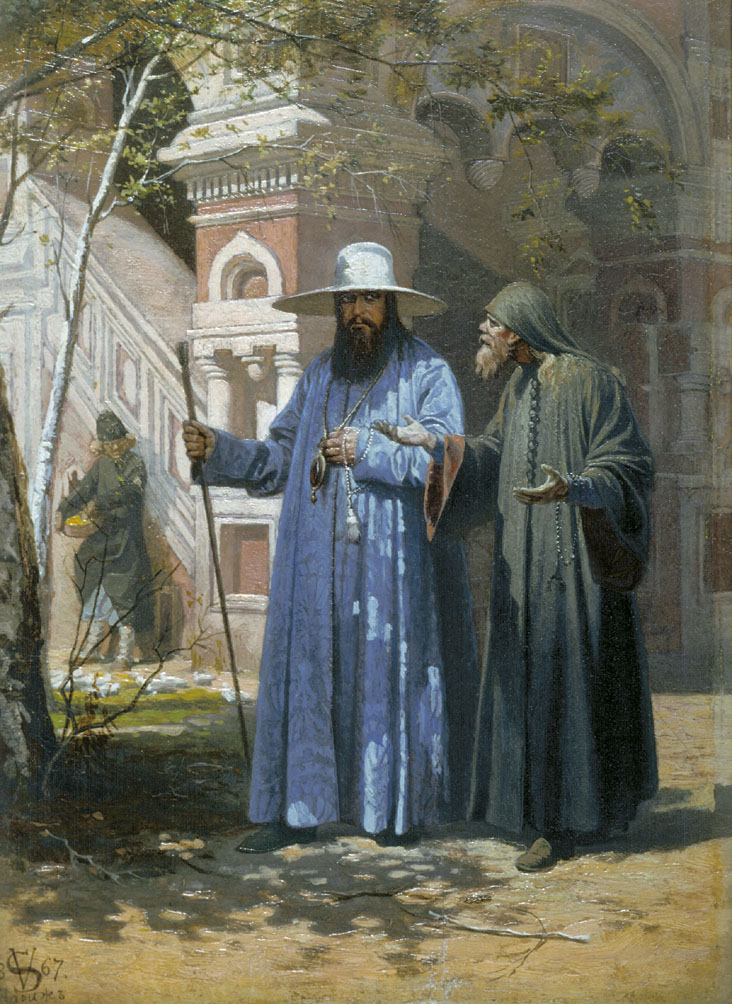
Patriarch Nikon in the New Jerusalem Monastery

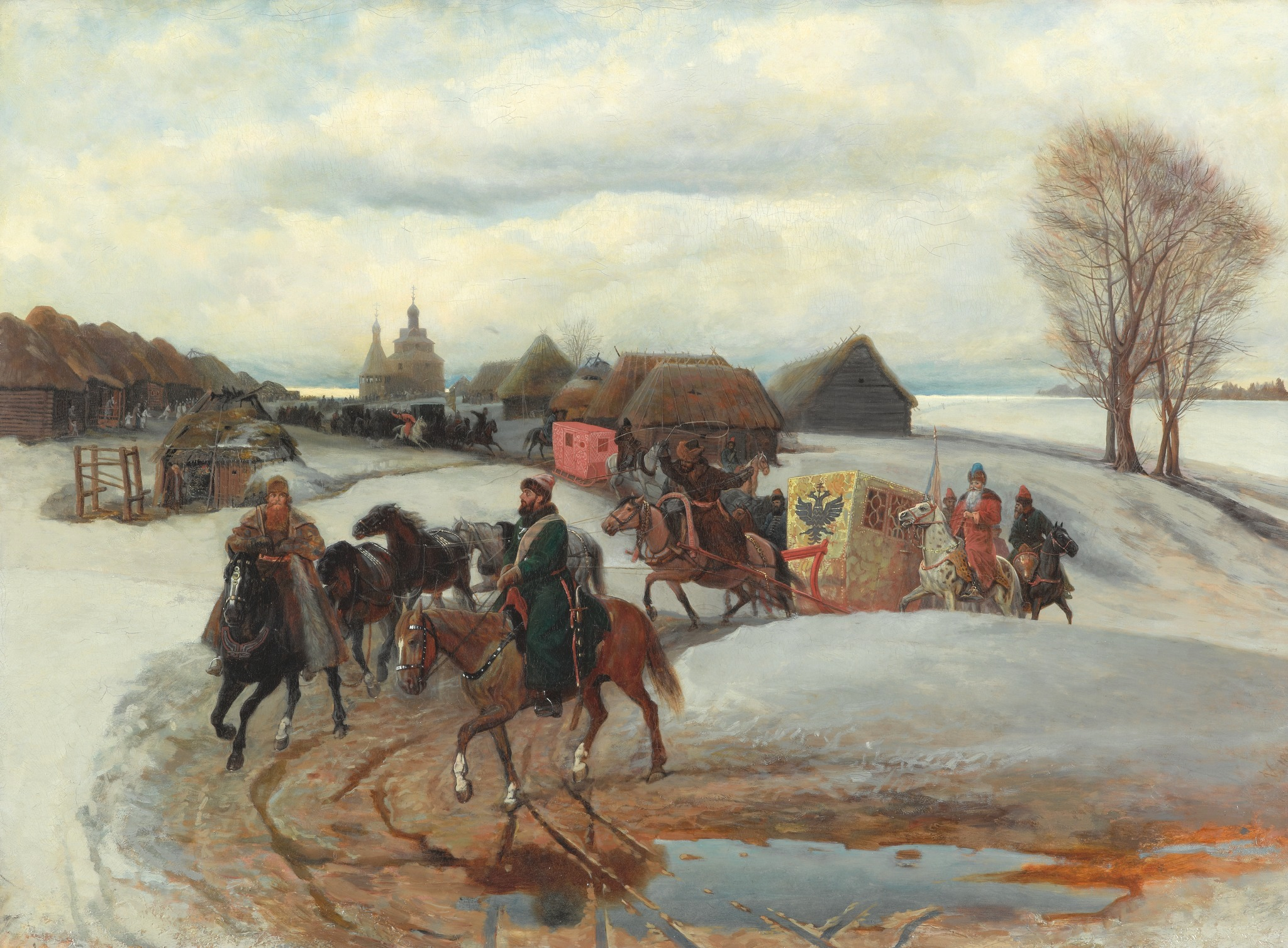
The Spring Pilgrimage of the Tsarina, under Tsar Aleksy Mihailovich
