= Édouard De Bièfve =

Belgian painter (1808–1882)

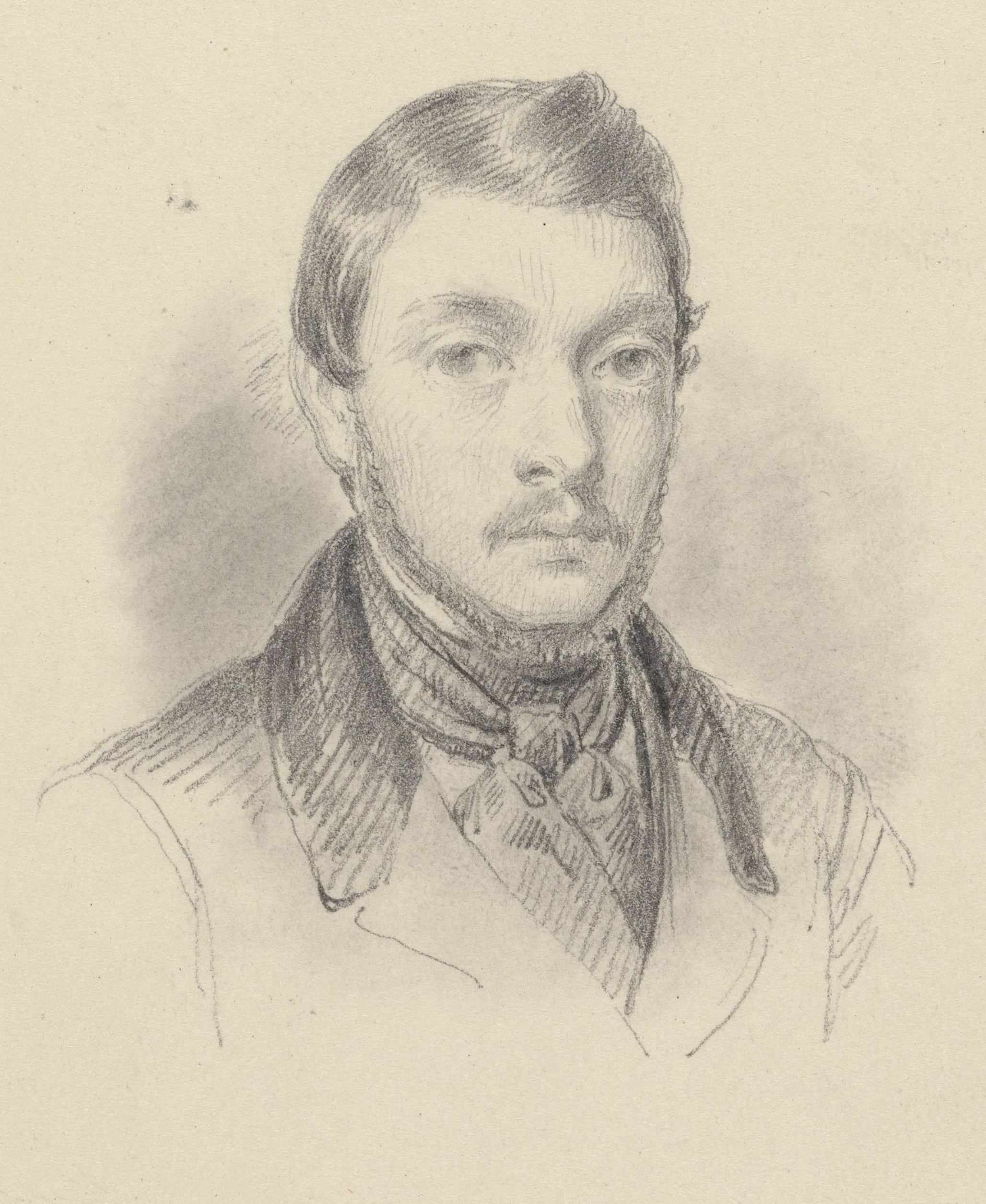
- Self-portrait, 1830–1842
- Born: 4 December 1808; Brussels, First French Empire
- Died: 7 February 1882 (aged 73); Brussels, Belgium
- Education: Academy of Fine Arts of Brussels
- Occupation: Painter

Édouard De Bièfve (4 December 1808 – 7 February 1882) was a Belgian history and portrait painter. He was one of the leading representatives of the romantic movement in Belgium and his work had an important influence on the development of history painting in Germany.

== Life ==
Edouard De Bièfve was born into a well-off and noble family in Brussels. He studied at the Academy of Fine Arts of Brussels and then continued his studies from 1828 to 1830 in the school of the Belgian history painter Joseph Paelinck, who had been a pupil of Jacques-Louis David. He went to Paris in 1831, where he became a follower of the new romantic movement. He frequented the studio of the French romantic sculptor David d'Angers. Sculpting and painting at the same time, he exhibited his works in Paris and also participated in exhibitions in Antwerp, Ghent and Brussels. His painting entitled Count Ugolino and his sons in the tower of Pisa was particularly well received when it was exhibited in 1836.

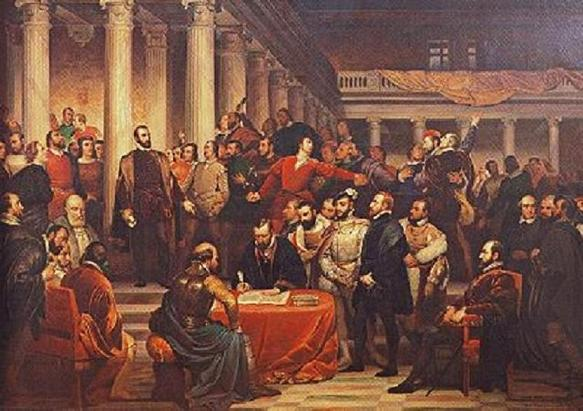
Compromise of the nobles

His romantic paintings on historic subjects got the attention of the government of the newly independent Belgian state which was looking to glorify its past as well as to foster a new cultural renaissance in Belgium. The government commissioned a work from him on a theme related to the revolt of the Spanish Netherlands against the Spanish rulers. The painting entitled the Compromise of the nobles depicts the moment when members of the lesser nobility in the Spanish Netherlands conclude a local covenant (the ‘compromise’) to petition the Regent Margaret of Parma on 5 April 1566 to moderate the repression of so-called heresy in the country. The painting was exhibited in 1841 together with a history painting – also commissioned by the Belgian government – entitled The Abdication of Charles V by the renowned Belgian romantic painter Louis Gallait. Both paintings were praised and were exhibited in many cities in Europe. They enjoyed a particularly enthusiastic reception in Germany where they formed an important impetus for the development of a German school of history painting. The painting also gained de Bièfve the patronage of Prince Frederick William of Prussia (the future Frederick III) who commissioned a painting entitled Rubens establishes peace between Spain and England. The kings of Bavaria and Wurtemberg followed suit and also ordered paintings from him. As a sign of the high regard in which he was held in the German-speaking world he was invited to become a member of the Academies of Berlin, Dresden, Munich and Vienna.

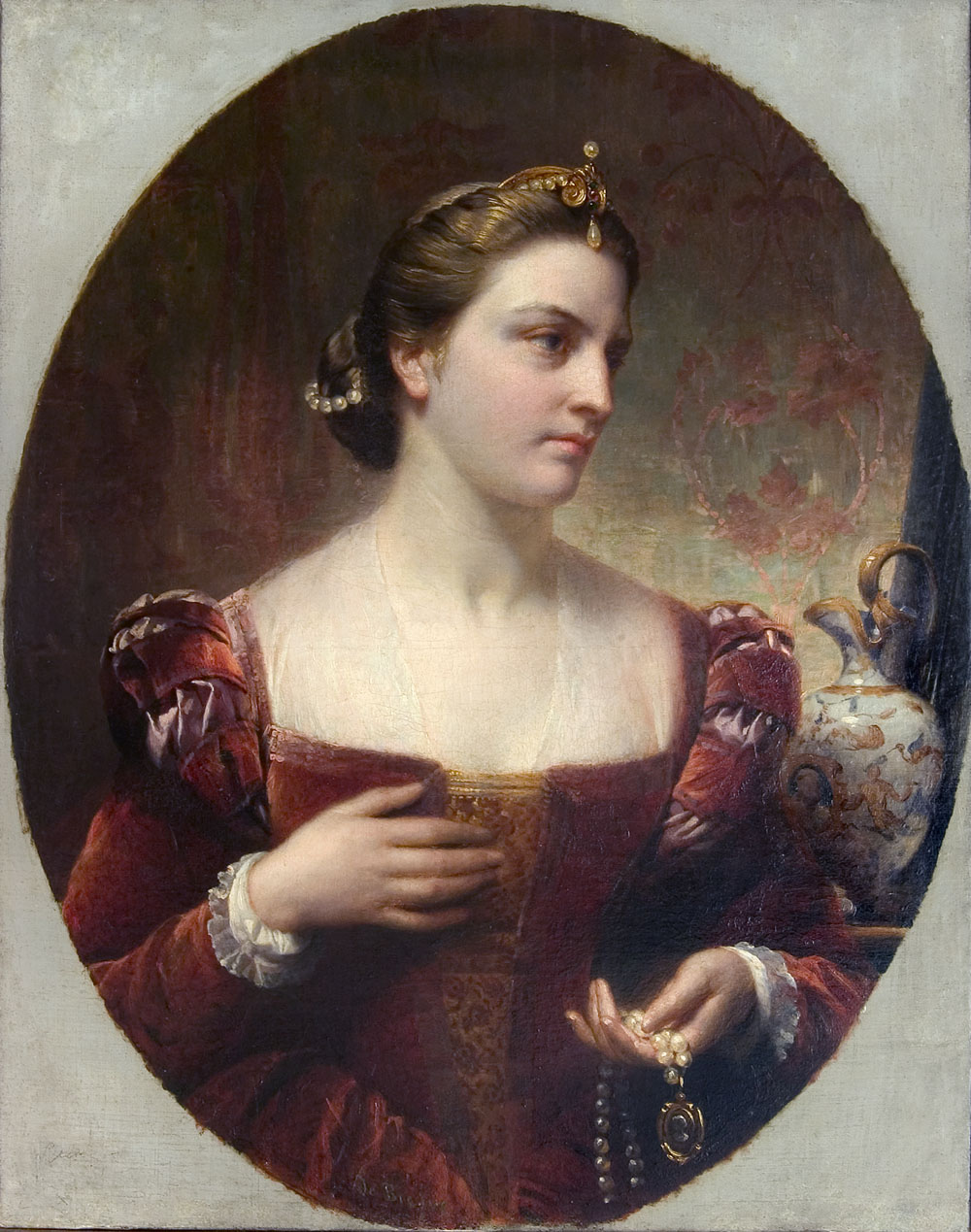
Alexandra of Denmark

In the year 1841 he returned from Paris and lived from then on in Brussels. When the painting ordered by the King of Prussia was finally finished and exhibited in Brussels in 1848, the work met with negative criticism and was judged to be mediocre and historically inaccurate.

Thereafter, De Bièfve continued to work for his royal patrons and would occasionally receive a commission from the Belgian government (such as the Belgium founding the monarchy, painted for the meeting hall of the Belgian Senate, 1853). However, he no longer exhibited his new works publicly until 1875 when he showed a historic painting entitled The episode of the banquet of the confederated nobles at the Brussels Salon. By that time, history painting had become a thing of the past and was being replaced by the modernist movement.

De Bièfve died in Brussels on 7 February 1882. On his death, he left the Belgian state all the paintings in his studio together with a sum of money for the erection of a magnificent tomb monument. His tomb can be visited at the cemetery of Laeken.

== Work ==
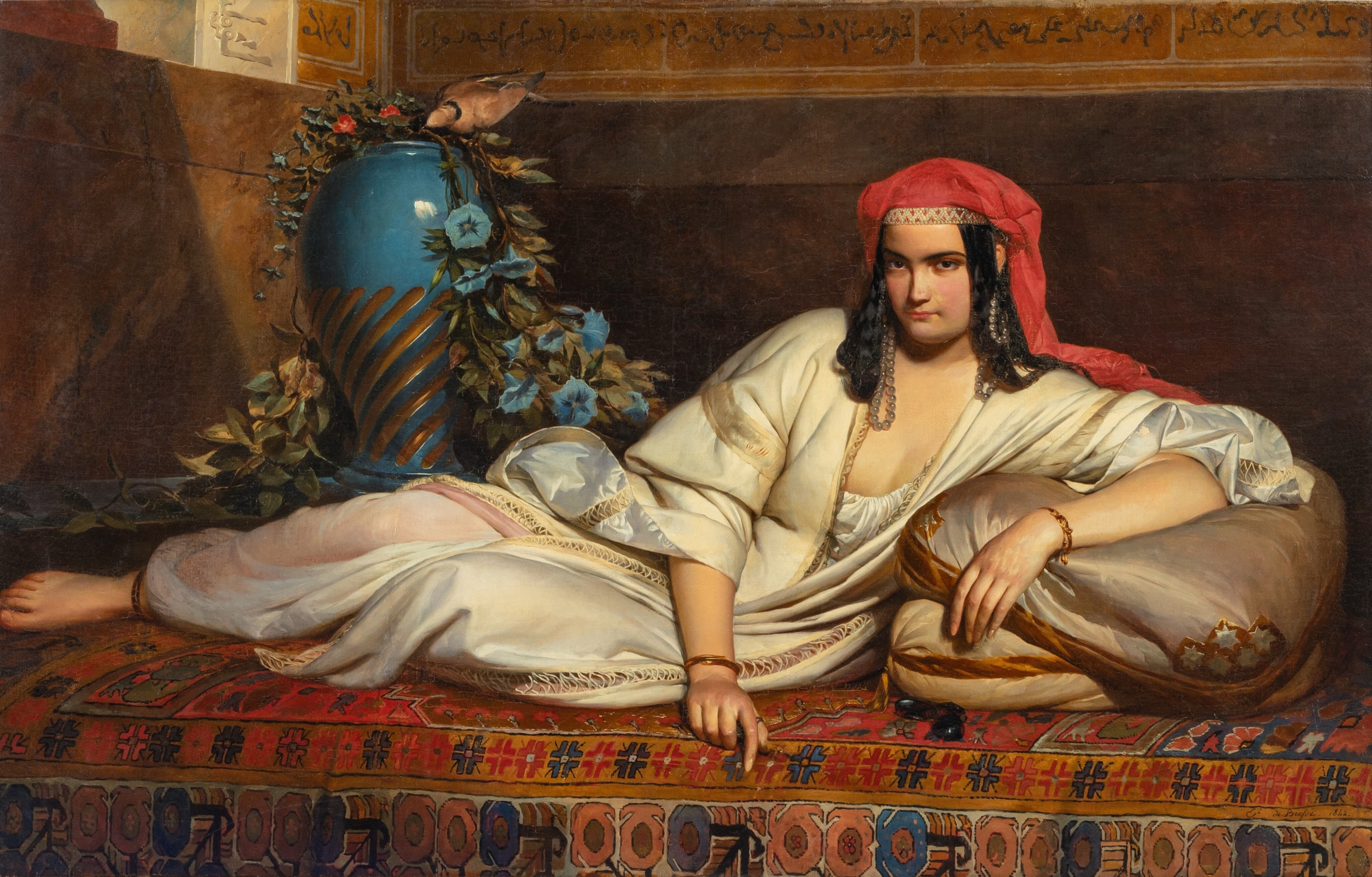
The Almeh (The Sultan's Favorite)

Edouard De Bièfve mainly painted history paintings on unusually large canvasses. He belonged to the first wave of Belgian romantic painters who had typically trained in Paris where they had come into contact with the new romantic movement. Others in this group included Gustave Wappers, Louis Gallait, Ernest Slingeneyer, Nicaise de Keyser and other minor figures. They chose as the subject matter of their work important historical events in Belgium’s history which were regarded as key to the country’s national identity. Unlike their French models such as Delacroix, their work, though colourful, lacked true romantic zest and was quickly recuperated by the establishment which rewarded the artists with commissions and rewards. De Bièfve’s history paintings were no exception to this and they quickly became a form of national propaganda.

Edouard De Bièfve painted portraits and some orientalist paintings such as The Almeh, reflecting a growing interest in this subject matter in Europe at the time. The Almeh depicts an Egyptian dancing girl reclining on a couch. The painting caused quite a stir when it was exhibited at the Brussels Salon of 1842, 23 years prior to Manet's Olympia causing a similar scandal at the Paris Salon of 1865. It scandalized visitors of the Salon who felt it was flagrantly sexual. The English author Charlotte Brontë saw the controversial painting during a visit to Brussels and was so upset by it that she wrote at length about it in her final novel, Villette. The painting's fame was further boosted when a lithograph reproducing it was published under the title The Sultan's Favourite Songstress in Georg Ebers's book, Egypt: Descriptive, Historical, and Picturesque, (I, New York, 1878, p. 285).
