= Julius Schrader =

German painter

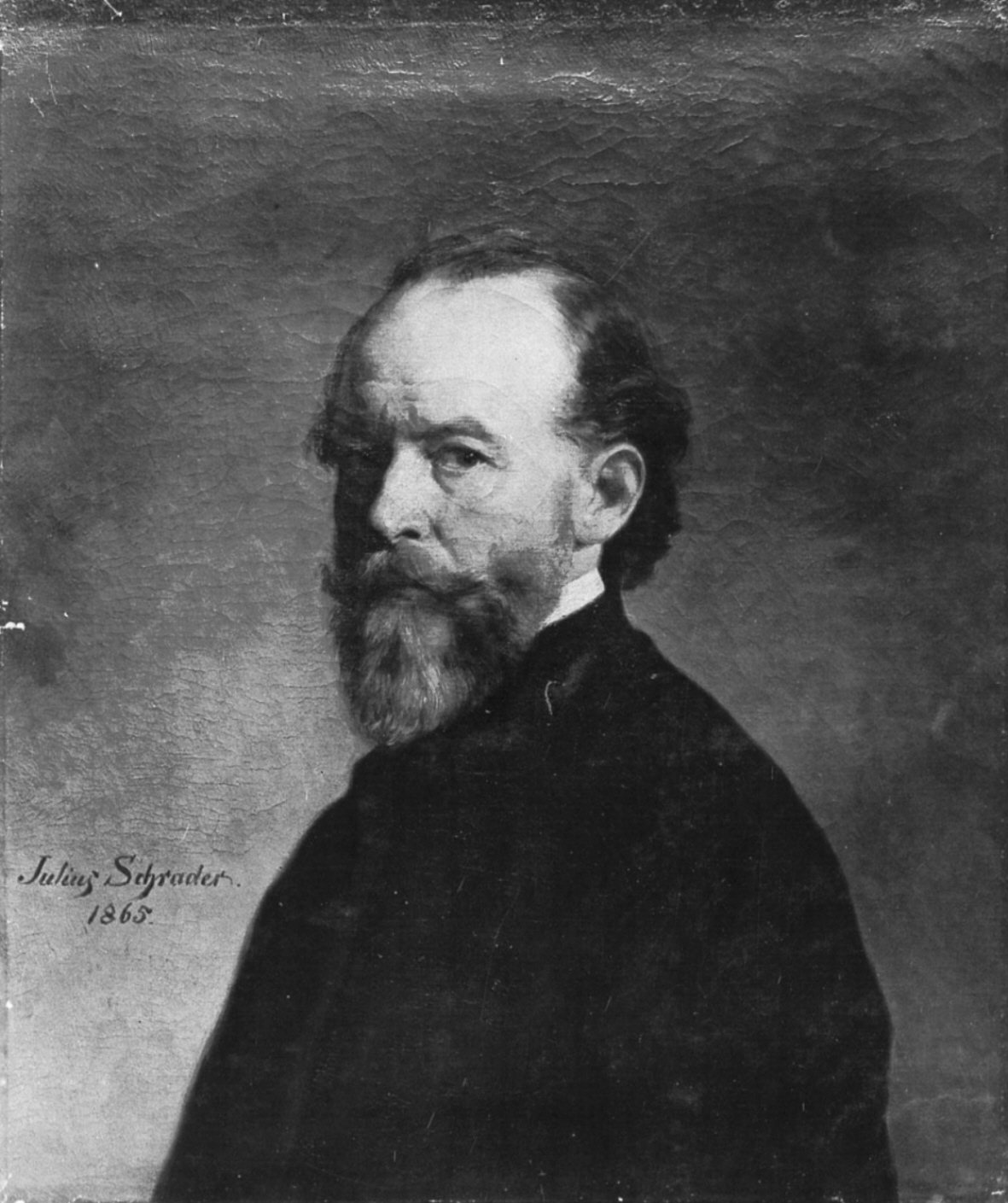
- Self-portrait of 1865
- Born: 16 June 1815; Berlin, Prussia
- Died: 16 February 1900 (aged 84); Berlin, German Empire

Julius Friedrich Antonio Schrader (16 June 1815 – 16 February 1900) was a German painter, associated with the Düsseldorf school of painting.

== Biography ==
He studied at the Prussian Academy of Arts in Berlin, then spent five years at the Kunstakademie Düsseldorf, where he became a student of Schadow. He spent two more years in Düsseldorf, and later traveled in Italy (1845–47), England, The Netherlands, and Belgium and in the last country fell under the influence of the colorists Louis Gallait and Édouard De Bièfve. In 1851, he became a professor at the Berlin Academy.

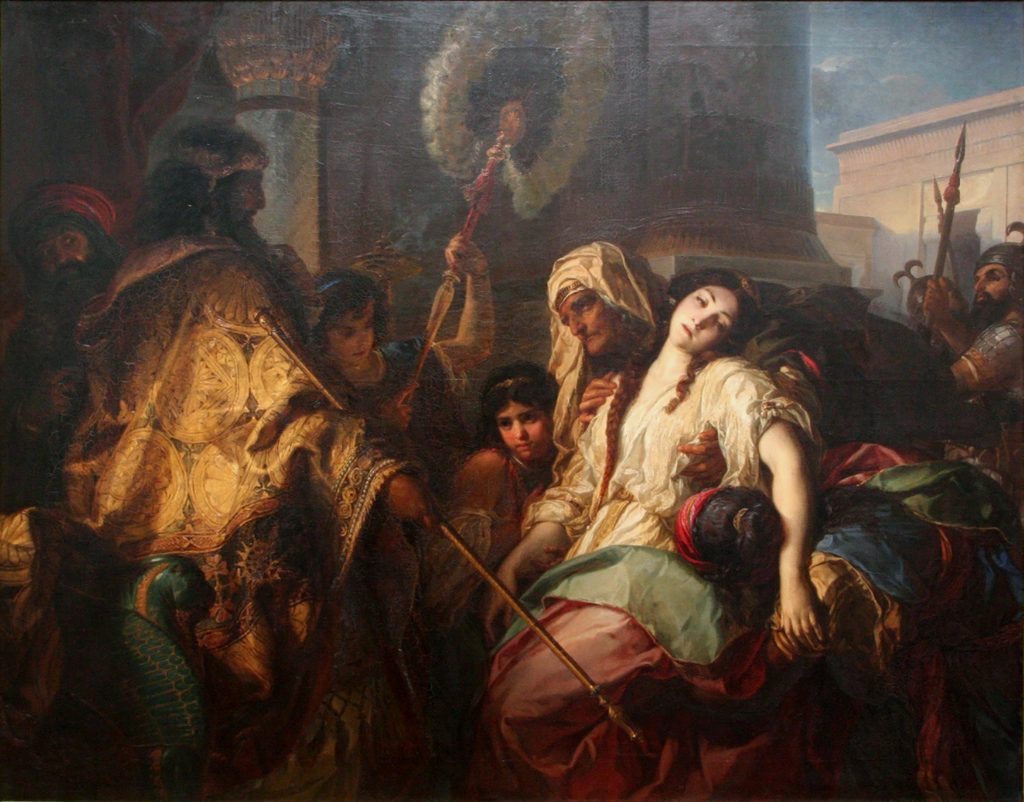
Esther vor Ahasver ("Esther before Ahasuerus; 1856)

== Works ==
- Surrender of Calais to Edward III (1847)
- Frederick the Great after the Battle of Kolin (1849)
- Death of Leonardo da Vinci (1851)
- Milton and His Daughters (1855)
- Cromwell at the Death-Bed of His Daughter (1859)

In fresco he painted First Twelve Christian Monarchs in the Royal Chapel, and Consecration of the Church of Saint Sophia, Constantinople in the New Museum, Berlin. Among his portraits are those of Alexander von Humboldt and the historian Leopold von Ranke.
