= Louis Gallait =

Belgian painter (1810–1887)

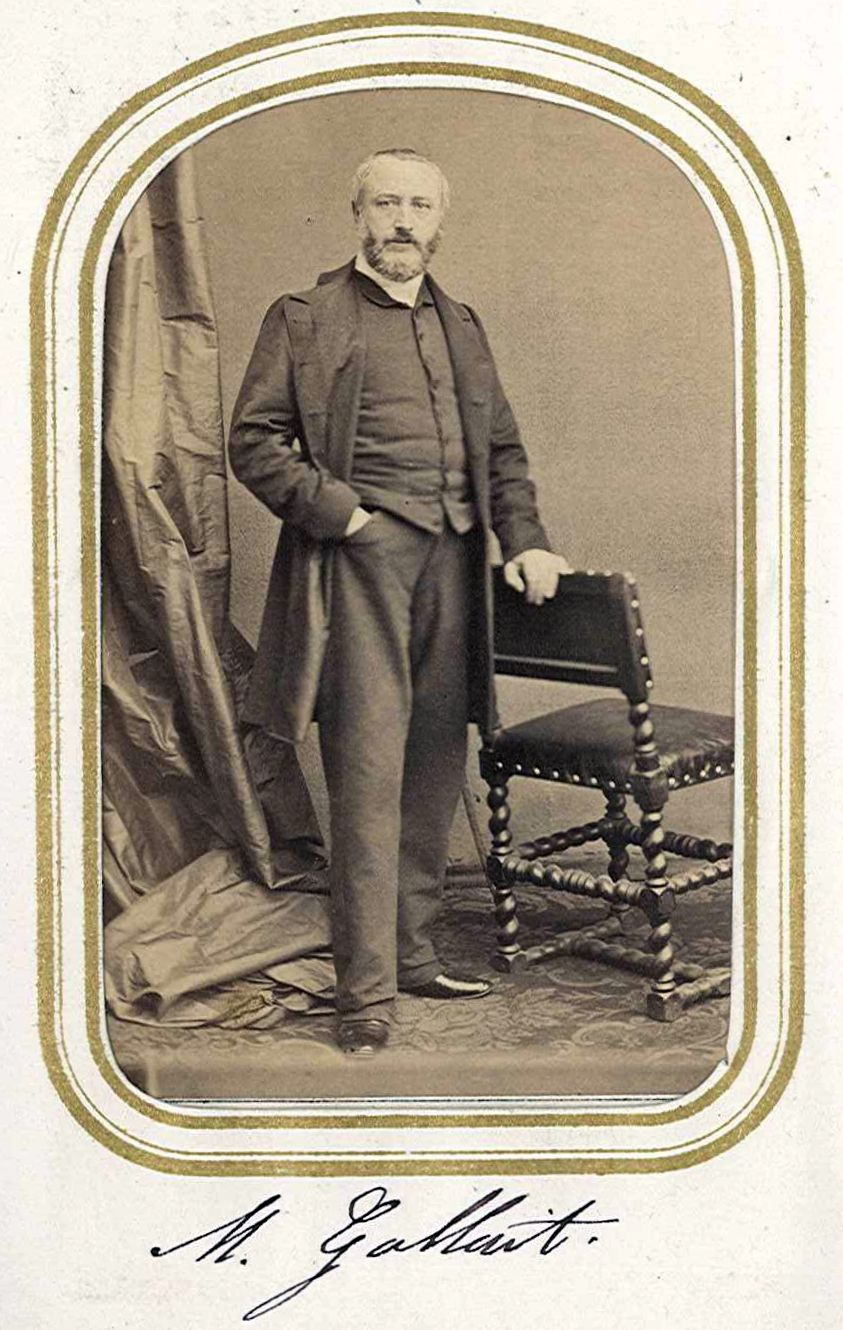
- Louis Gallait, photographed by Ghémar Frères
- Born: Louis Gallait; 9 June 1810; Tournai, Belgium
- Died: 20 October 1887 (aged 77); Brussels, Belgium
- Occupation: Painter

Louis Gallait (9 or 10 May 1810 – 20 November 1887) was a Belgian painter. He lay at the basis of a revival of history painting in Belgium. He earned his reputation especially with the large painting of Charles V's abdication. Gallait's works were esteemed because of their realism, faithfulness of the costumes and color composition of his paintings. He was also a distinguished portrait painter.

== Biography ==
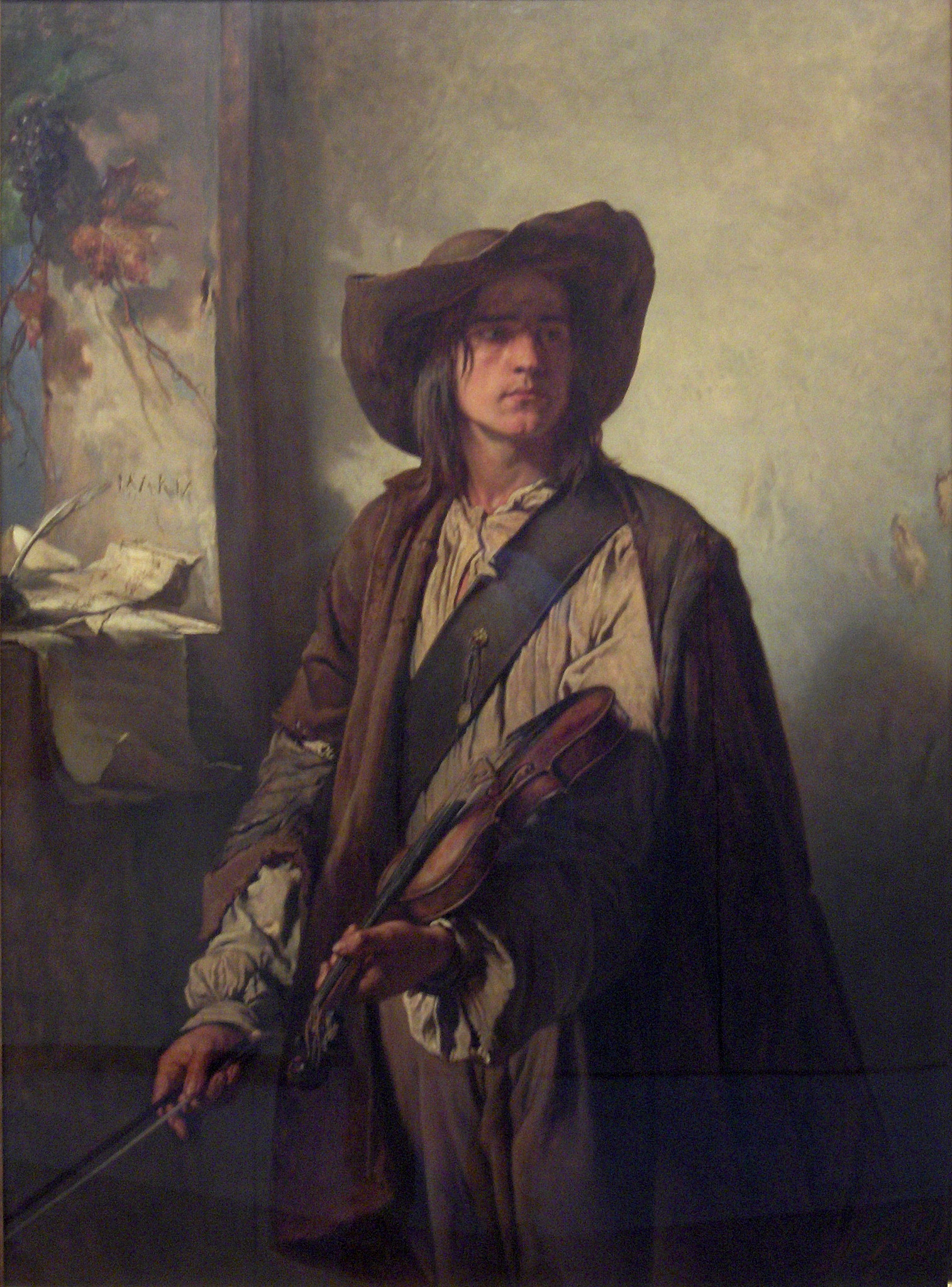
Art and Liberty (1849)

Gallait was born in Tournai, Hainaut, Belgium in 1810. He first studied in his native town under Philippe Auguste Hennequin. In 1832 his first picture, Tribute to Caesar, won a prize at the Salon of Ghent. He then went to Antwerp to continue his studies under Mathieu Ignace van Brée, and in the following year exhibited at the Brussels Salon Christ Healing the Blind. This picture was purchased by subscription and placed in the Tournai Cathedral. Gallait next went to Paris, and he sent to the Belgian Salons Job on the Dunghill, Montaigne Visiting Tasso in Prison, and – to the Brussels Gallery in 1841 — The Abdication of Charles V. The latter painting, which had been commissioned by the Belgian government, was hailed as a triumph and gained him a European reputation. The painting was exhibited together with a painting entitled the Compromise of Nobles by another young Belgian painter, Edouard de Bièfve. Both paintings subsequently travelled to exhibitions in many cities in Europe, and enjoyed a particularly enthusiast reception in Germany where they formed an important impetus for the development of a German school of history painting. Official invitations induced him to settle at Brussels.

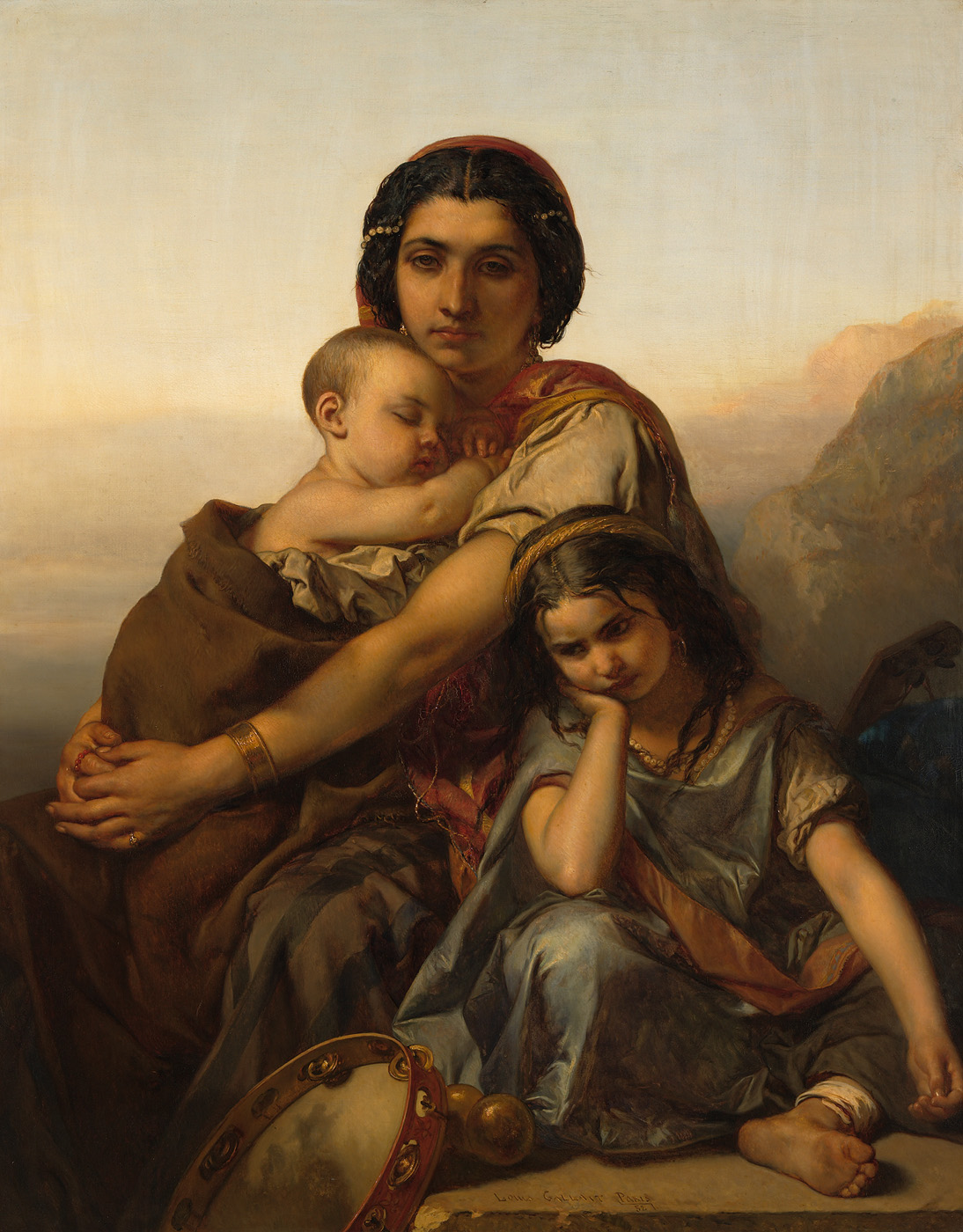
Gypsy woman with two children (1852)

Among his accomplished works may be named The Last Honors paid to Counts Egmont and Horn by the Corporations of the Town of Brussels, now at Tournai; The Death of Egmont, in the Berlin gallery; the Coronation of Baudouin, Emperor of Constantinople, painted for Versailles; The Temptation of St Anthony, in the palace at Brussels; The Siege of Antioch, Art and Liberty, Portrait of M. B. Dumortier and The Plague at Tournay, all in the Brussels gallery. A Gipsy Woman and her Children was painted in 1852. He also served as the director and president of the Académie Royale des Beaux-Arts.

"M. Gallait has all the gifts that may be acquired by work, taste, judgment and determination," wrote Théophile Gautier. His art is that of a man of tact, a skilled painter, happy in his dramatic treatment but superficial. No doubt, this Walloon artist, following the example of the Flemings of the Renaissance and the treatment of Belgian classical painters and the French Romantic school, sincerely aimed at truth. Unfortunately, misled by contemporary taste, he could not conceive of it other than as dressed in sentimentality. As an artist employed by the State, he exercised considerable influence, and for a long time he was the leader of public taste in Brussels.

In 1849 he became correspondent of the Royal Institute of the Netherlands, and the next year he became associated member.

Notable students include Cesare Dell'Acqua. Gallait died in Brussels in 1887.

== Honours ==
- 1881: Grand Cordon in the Order of Leopold.
- Member of the Royal Academy of Science, Letters and Fine Arts of Belgium.

== Gallery ==
Abdication of Emperor Charles V. The painting shows his sister, Queen Mary of Hungary, wearing white even though she never wore anything but black after her husband's death, 1841

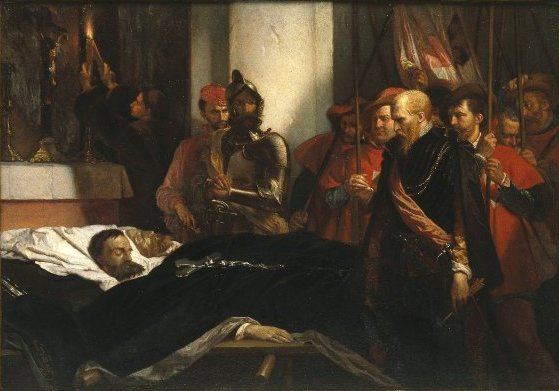
The Last Honors to Counts Egmont and Hoorne, reduction, 1859

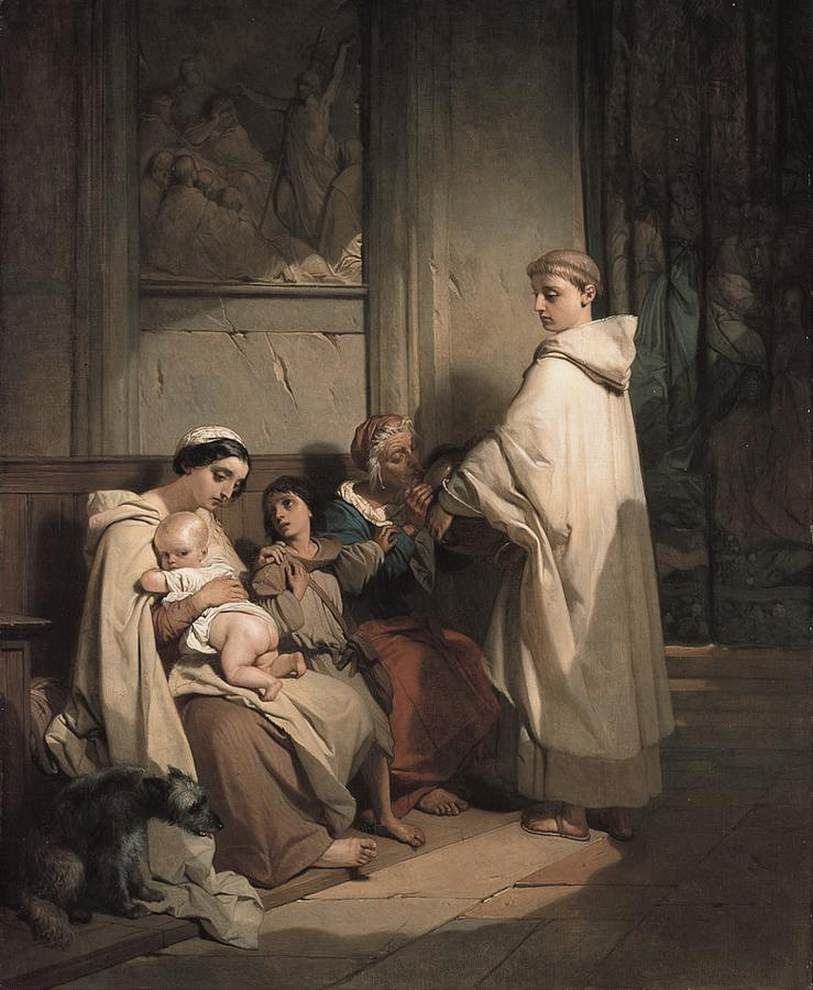
Monk Feeding the Poor, 1845

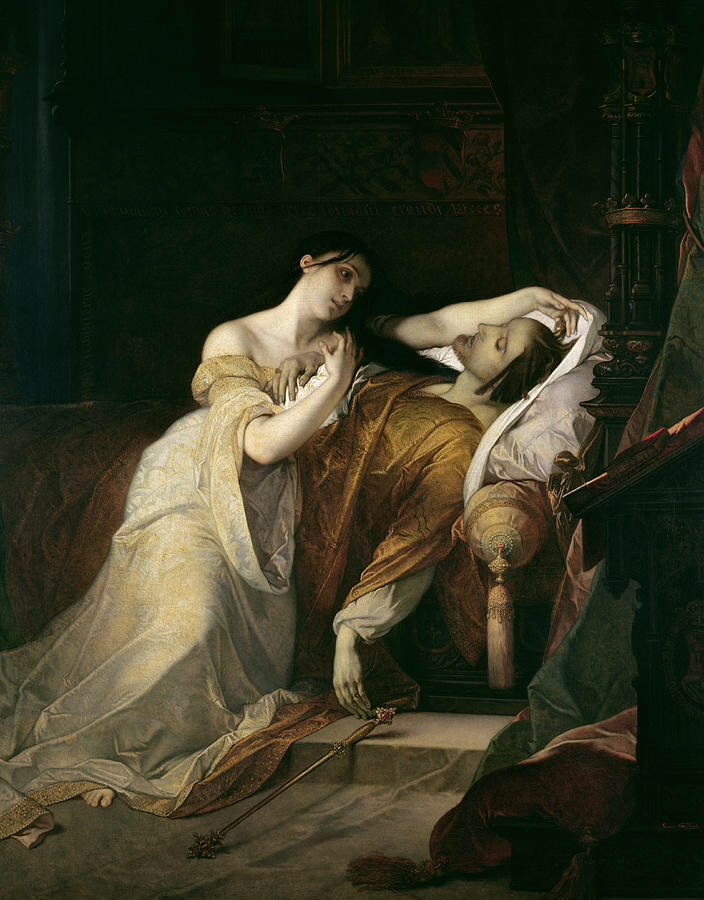
Joanna the mad with Philip I the handsome, 1850

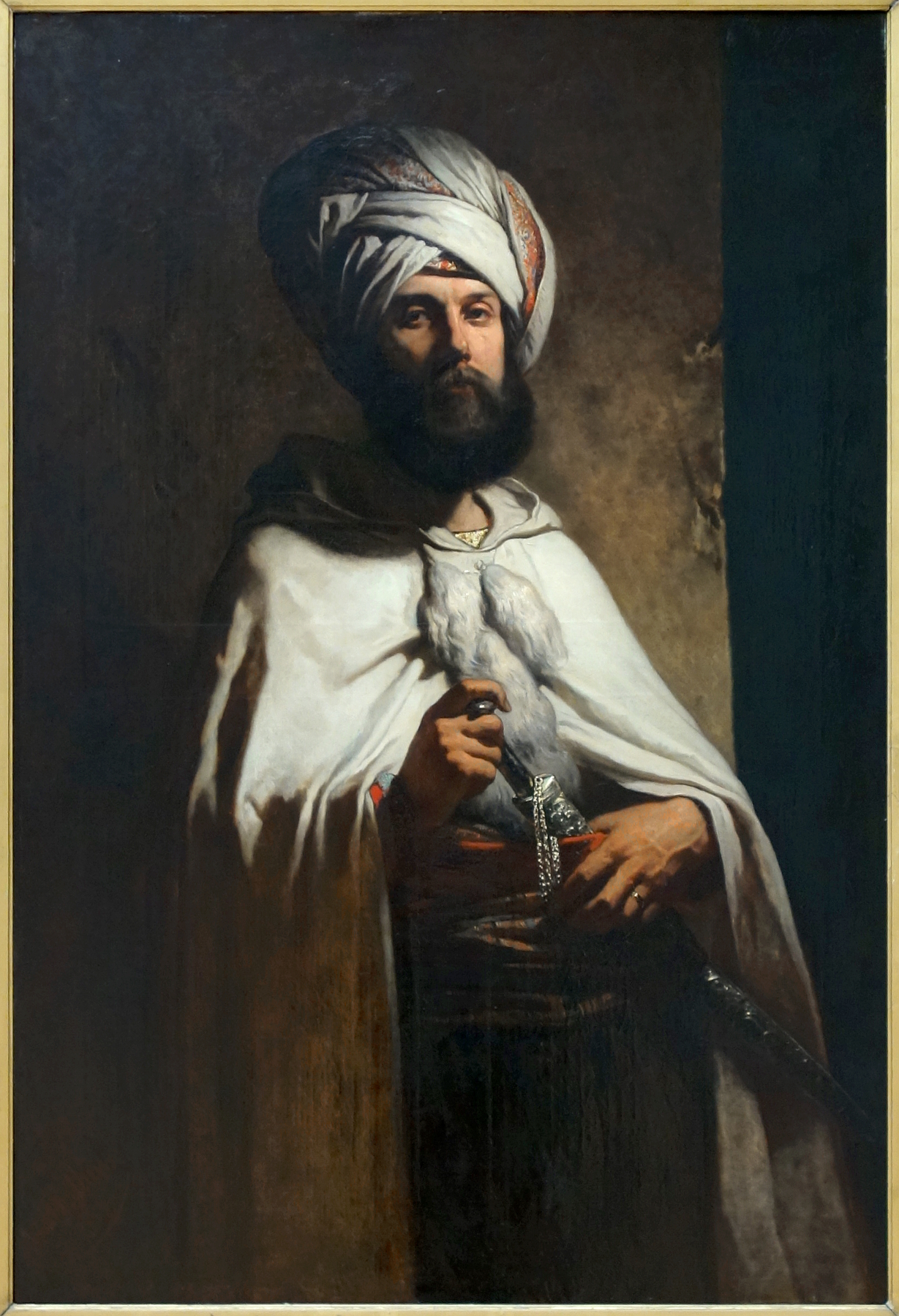
Charles Cousin, painter and engraver, in Arab costume at the Palais des Beaux-Arts in Lille, 1838

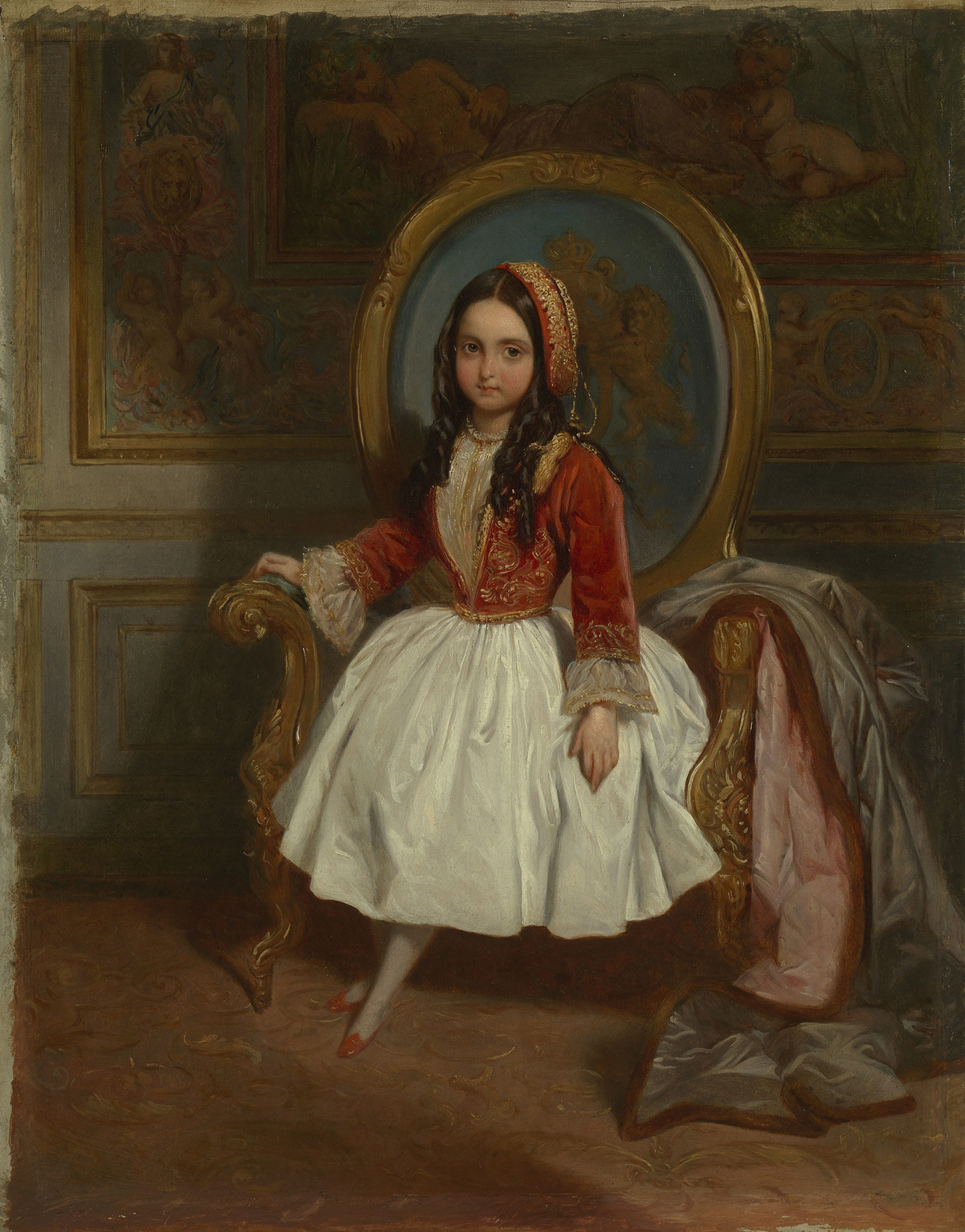
Princess Charlotte of Belgium, 1846
