= Ernest Slingeneyer =

Belgian painter (1820–1894)

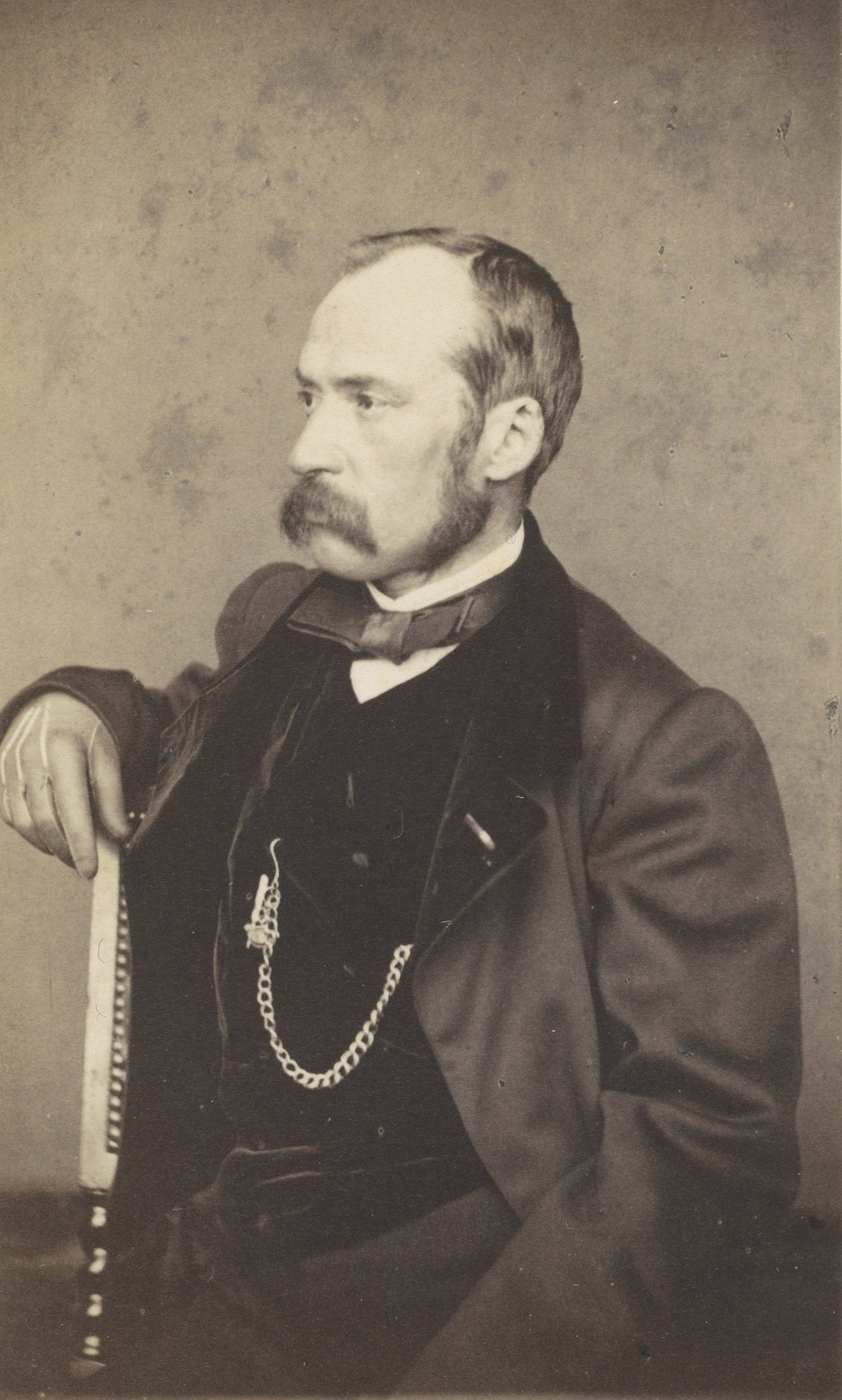
- Self-portrait, 1861
- Born: Ernest Slingeneyer; 28 May 1820; Lochristi, Belgium
- Died: 27 April 1894 (aged 73); Brussels, Belgium
- Education: Academy of Fine Arts of Antwerp
- Occupation: Painter

Ernest Slingeneyer, Ernest Isidore Hubert Slingeneyer or Ernst Slingeneyer (28 May 1820 – 27 April 1894) was a Belgian painter of history paintings, portraits, genre scenes and the occasional landscape. Slingeneyer is regarded as one of the last representatives of Romanticism in Belgian painting and of Academism in Romanticism in Belgian art. In his later career he was one of the leading representatives of Orientalism in Belgium. An excellent portraitist, Slingeneyer made portraits of historical figures as well as of well-known figures from his time. Slingeneyer was also a politician and was a member of the Belgian Chamber of Representatives for the Independists of Brussels, a coalition of personalities bound by their opposition to the Radicalist liberals. As a politician he promoted Academic art and agitated against new artistic currents as promoted by, amongst others, the Société Libre des Beaux-Arts in Brussels.

== Life ==
Ernest Slingeneyer was born in Lochristi as the second son of the tax collector Joannes Andreas Slingeneyer and Anna Marie Josephina Juliana Pauwels, a homemaker. The family moved in 1825 to Geraardsbergen and later to Antwerp. Destined for a military career, Slingeneyer met with his father's opposition to his wish to study art. In the end he was allowed to attend classes at the Academy of Fine Arts of Antwerp. Here he studied during the day painting under the leading Antwerp Romantic painter Gustaf Wappers while in the evening he took drawing classes. While still a student he exhibited a big canvas entitled The arrest of Louis, Count of Crécy which was received with critical acclaim. When a National Fund for the encouragement of historical painting art and sculpture was established by Royal Decree of 25 November 1839, Slingeneyer was quick to sign up for it. He was selected by the National Fund to paint various religious and historical subjects which he executed in an Academic and theatrical style.

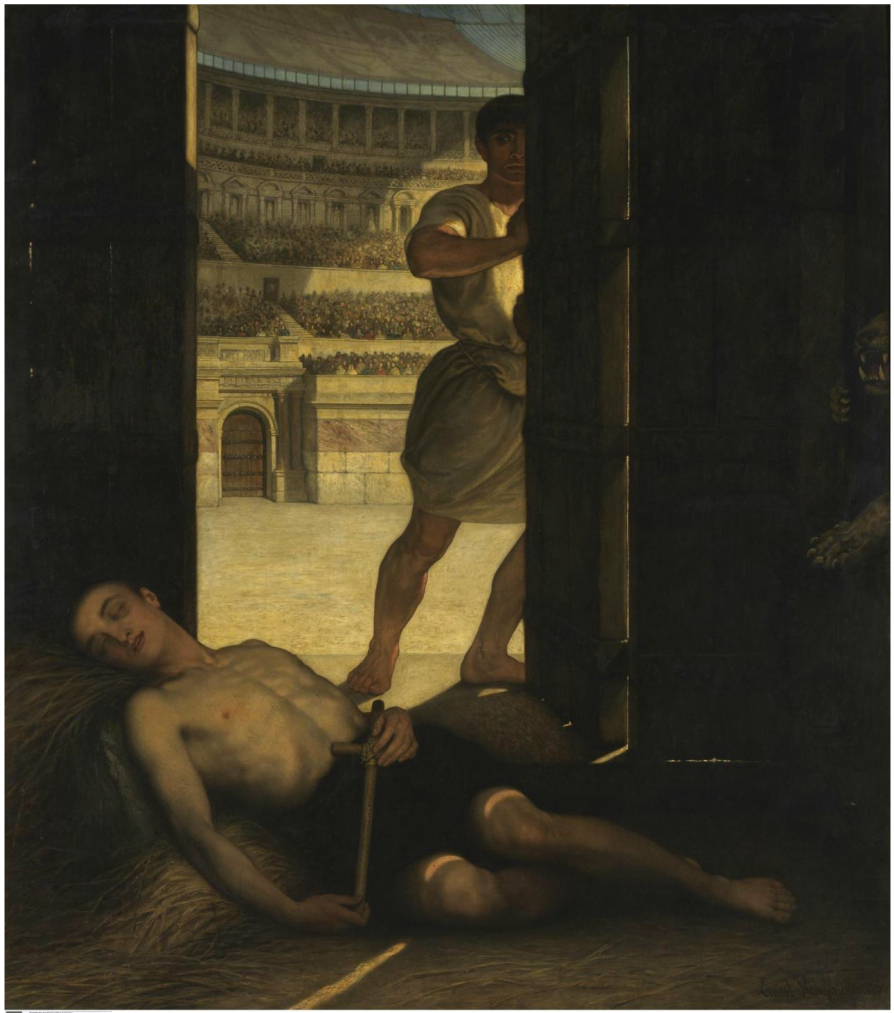
Christian martyr

Encouraged by his success he created an even more ambitious and larger composition entitled The sinking of the French battleship Le Vengeur. Its subject was an episode of the naval combat in which, on 1 June 1794, the French fleet commanded by French Admiral Louis Thomas Villaret de Joyeuse was defeated by the English fleet commanded by Richard Howe. The canvas measuring 16 square metres was exhibited in 1842. It created a sensation with its freer, more spontaneous and warmer form than that usually association with the academic school of painting. It was thus a victory for the Romanticism introduced by Slingeneyer's master Wappers. Wappers himself had been inspired by French Romanticism. The sinking of the French battleship Le Vengeur was compared with The Raft of the Medusa by the French Romantic painter Théodore Géricault.

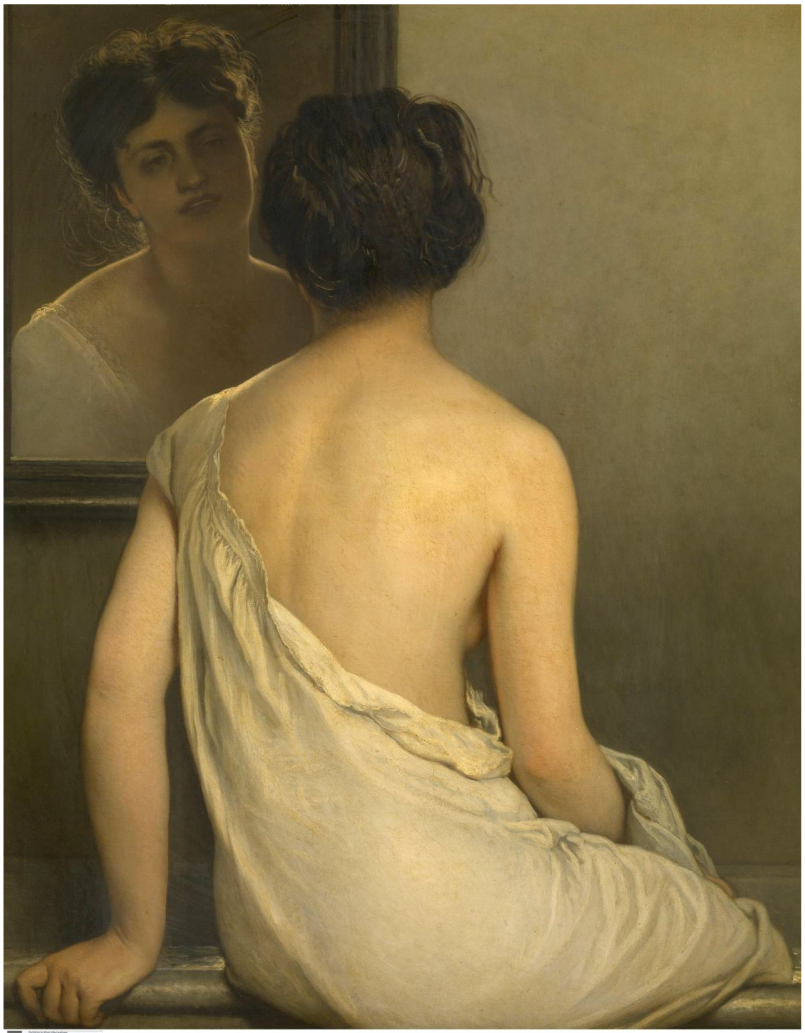
Woman in a bathtub

The success of the painting secured for the young painter an elite patronage including from King William II of the Netherlands who commissioned in 1844 his The death of sea captain Claessens and King Leopold I of Belgium who bought his The death of Jacobsen, which had won the Gold Medal at the Brussels Salon of 1845. The Belgian government commissioned a large historical painting from Slingeneyer. Slingeneyer chose the Battle of Lepanto as its subject. The Battle of Lepanto was a naval engagement that took place on 7 October 1571 when a fleet of the Holy League, led by the Venetian Republic and the Spanish Empire, inflicted a major defeat on the fleet of the Ottoman Empire in the Gulf of Patras. When The battle of Lepanto was finally finished and exhibited in 1848, it fell short of expectations in spite of its qualities in terms of composition and execution. This was likely a reflection of the public's growing disappointment with the historical school of painting promoted by the faculty and alumni of the Academy of Antwerp whereas the school of Brussels was gaining in prominence. The latter had abandoned Academism in favour of a Romanticism that was less theatrical and materialistic and more sentimental and elegant. This school was represented by Louis Gallait, a pupil of Paul Delaroche. Slingeneyer was advised by his critics to go to Paris to immerse himself in the new art movements there and to leave Antwerp for Brussels. Taking this advice to heart, he traveled to the Netherlands and Germany, to Rome and to Paris. In Paris he visited the studios of Paul Delaroche, Joseph-Nicolas Robert-Fleury and Ary Scheffer.

Slingeneyer returned to Belgium where he settled in 1849 in the capital Brussels to which he was attracted by its better art market. His Episode of St. Bartholomew exhibited in 1849 was considered a revenge for his Battle of Lepanto as the work showed strength and a genuine emotion. The Death of Nelson, which was exhibited in 1850 in one of the rooms of the Botanical Garden of Brussels was also appreciated for its skillful staging. The artist was then thirty years old and at the peak of his career. From this time onwards Slingeneyer could count himself as one of the highest paid painters of his time.

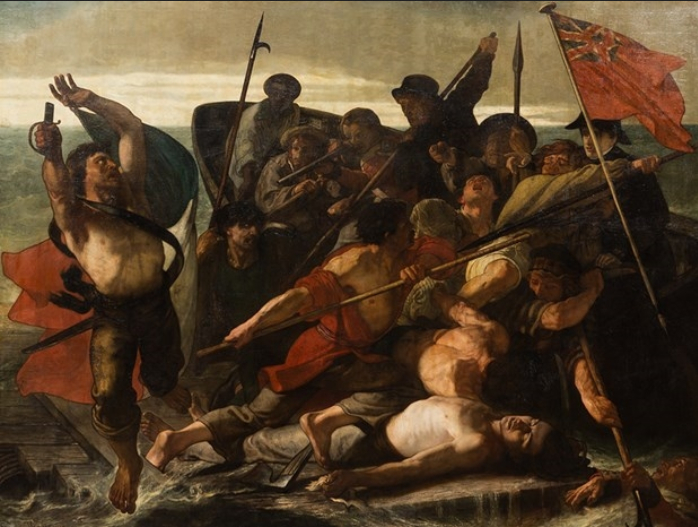
The heroic act of the sailors of the French ship Le Feu

His Christian martyr of 1860 was another major success for the artist, less due to its intrinsic merit than to the sentimentality of the subject, which showed a Christian being martyred in the Colosseum. This work was popularised through engravings and solidified his reputation. Around this time he opened a workshop in Brussels in which artists trained under his direction. This was regarded as a competitor of the workshop of Brussels' prominent painter François-Joseph Navez who was a major promoter of Classicism in Belgium. In fact, a number of Navez' pupils switched over to the studio of Slingeneyer. In 1878, Slingeneyer received a government commission of 122,000 Belgian Francs to paint a large canvas called Les Gloires de Belgique (The Glories of Belgium) and a series of twelve decorative panels with historical subjects for the great hall of the Academy Palace in Brussels. The artist took 15 years to complete the works which were installed in the Academy Palace in 1880.

In 1874 Slingeneyer showed at the Brussels Salon of 1875 another historical marine scene, The death of Camoëns. The painting could not compete with the new generation of painters "of the gray light". Camoëns hung at the exhibition opposite At dawn of Charles Hermans, a co-founder of the avantgarde Société Libre des Beaux-Arts. The realistic work of Hermans became a key work in Belgian art history whereas The death of Camoëns was so sharply criticised that from that time onwards Slingeneyer almost completely gave up participating in exhibitions, unless he was in the admission committee himself. He travelled to Italy and Northern Africa. The numerous genre pieces with themes from the folk culture of Italy and North Africa that were inspired by these trips were successful and can still count on the interest of today's collectors.

In 1842 Slingeneyer had become a member of the Masonic lodge Les Vrais Amis de l'Union in Brussels. Ernest Slingeneyer married on 11 October 1862 baroness Ernestine Thérèse Joséphine de Goeswin (Liège, 17 June 1830 – Brussels, 31 October 1909), a daughter of Baron Charles Eugène Ernest de Goeswin and Marie Charlotte Victoire de Cox de Hommelen. The couple had two children, Marie Jeanne Charlotte Léopoldine Ernestine (26 August 1864 – 13 April 1939) and André Charles Joseph Marie Luc (20 October 1866 – 11 December 1936).

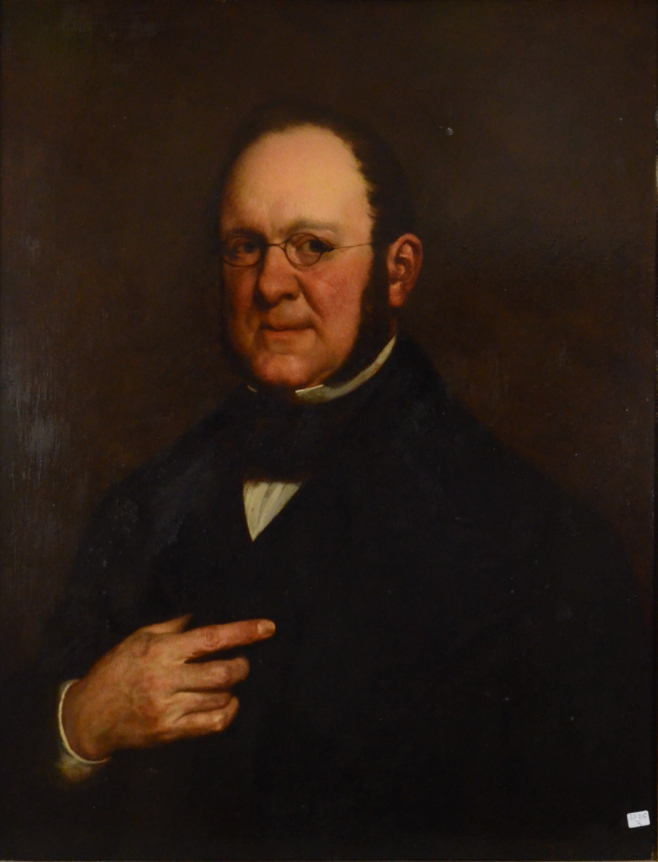
Portrait of a man

Slingeneyer was honoured multiple times by the ruling monarchs of his time: in 1850 he was appointed by the Belgian king a Knight the Order of Leopold, a few years later the Portuguese queen decorated him with the Christ Order, in August 1857 King William III of the Netherlands appointed him a Knight in the order of the Dutch Lion, in 1863 he was made an Officer and in 1870 a Commander in the Order of Leopold of Belgium. At the end of his life he still received distinctions such as the Légion d'Honneur of France, and the order of Franz-Joseph of Austria, Charles III of Spain, Ernest of Saxon-Coburg, St. Michael of Bavaria and others. On 7 April 1870 he became an elected member of the Fine Arts class of the bilingual Royal Academy of Science, Letters and Fine Arts of Belgium. In 1884 he was director of his class. From 1871 to 1894 he was a member of the Board of Directors of the Royal Museums of Painting and Sculpture, of which from 1889 on he became a vice-chairman together with the Orientalist painter Jean-François Portaels.

From the middle of the 19th century Slingeneyer belonged to the establishment and was one of the most valued painters of his time, also in financial terms. This was despite the fact that his art had gradually been left behind by the great artistic movements of his time. His son André married Marie Hélène Euphrasie Cogels, a daughter of baron Fredegand Cogels (1850–1932) and baroness Coralia de Gruben (1858–1945). On 12 October 1888, André Slingeneyer obtained the authorization to merge the family names Slingeneyer and de Goeswin, so that Ernest Slingeneyer still experienced that he became the ancestor of the new noble family Slingeneyer de Goeswin, which must undoubtedly have been a crowning achievement for him.

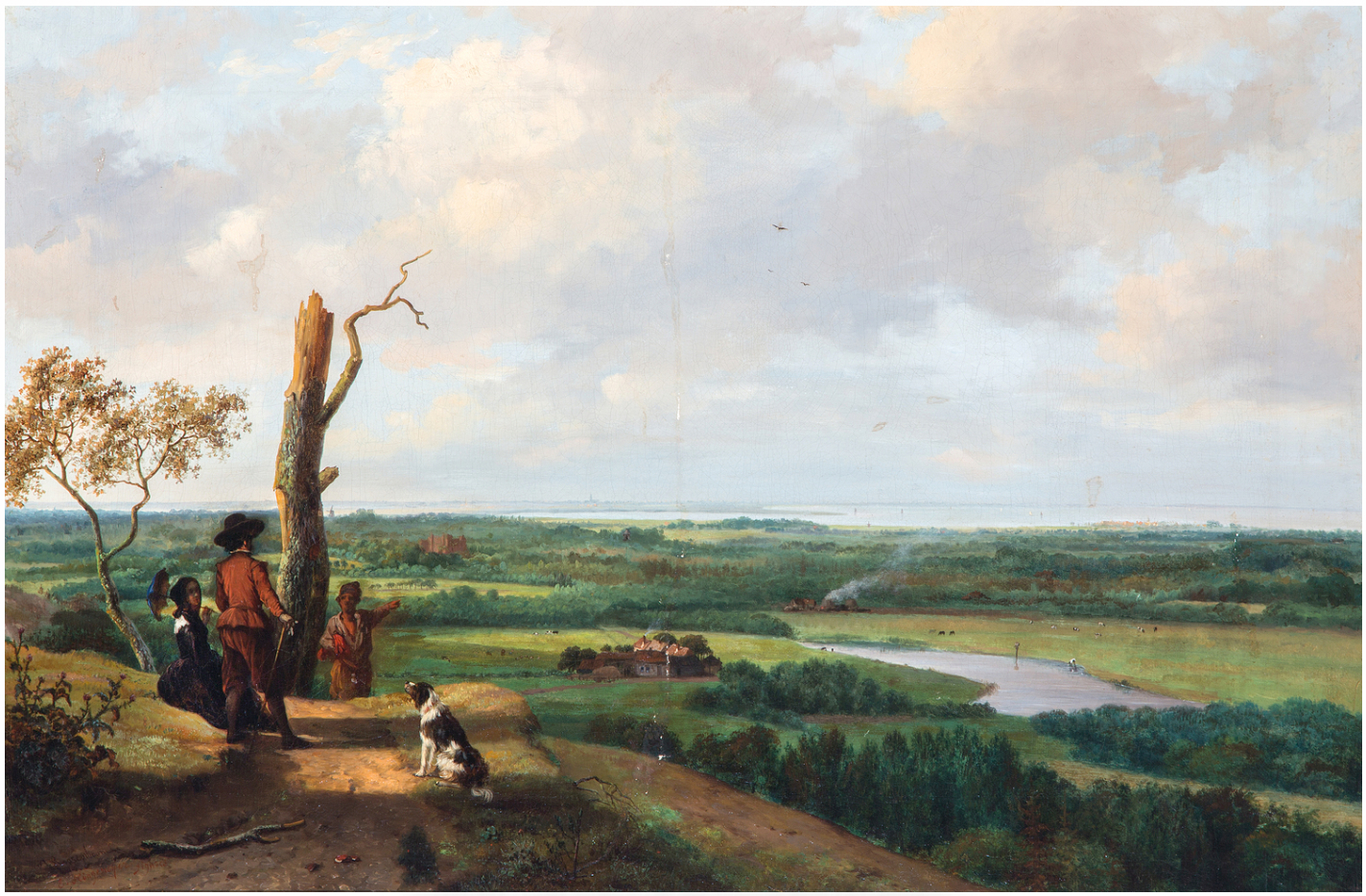
Panoramic landscape, collaboration with Nicolaas Johannes Roosenboom

On 10 June 1884 Slingeneyer was elected a Belgian representative to the Belgian Chamber of Representatives for the party of the 'Brussels independents'. This party was formed around 1880 as a political response to the breakthrough of the young generation of liberal radicals around Paul Janson. With the anti-radicalism as a unifying agent, a coalition of doctrinal liberals, conservatives and opportunists had formed in Brussels around a program of 'less politics, taxes and waste'. In 1882 this independent list formed a cartel with the Catholics with the aim of conquering the Brussels seats on the radical liberals. In 1884 they succeeded for the first time and that would remain so until the disappearance of the list in 1893 with the introduction of plural voting in Belgium. The Brussels delegation of which Slingeneyer formed part included a number of personalities from cultural circles and as a result was able to weigh in on debates about cultural and artistic subjects in the Chamber. Slingeneyer soon gained the status of 'messenger of cultural affairs' and as a result of his involvement the attention for all sorts of cultural themes in the Chamber increased considerably. He was situated politically on the conservative side. He became a champion of conservative views of the role of art institutions in Belgium. He repeatedly intervened in the acquisition policy of the most important national museums, the organization of the Prix de Rome and numerous other cultural and artistic matters. His artistic views were highly utilitarian. As in his own artistic career, he strongly emphasized the commercial aspect of art in parliament. He argued fiercely about the need to apply artistic principles in industry in order to gain a competitive advantage over the neighboring countries which he believed were involved in a fierce 'battle of nations'. Slingeneyer advocated for the involvement of the entire social life of the nation in the artistic sector. Even the smallest utensils had to express the artistic spirit of the nation. He adhered to a clear hierarchy in the artistic sector. His view was that the great national museums' primary goal should be to serve as inspiration for artists from the art academies and that 'ordinary people' without artistic and cultural baggage had no business visiting them. That is why Slingeneyer, for example, thought that no information boards should be placed next to paintings, since they were completely unnecessary for academically trained artists. Special industrial museums would need to be set up to cultivate workers, so that they could also be taught a 'feeling for the beautiful'. This strongly paternalistic attitude was typical for Slingeneyer. He also pleaded for state subsidies to artists from which he had also benefited greatly during his own career. Slingeneyer further agitated against avantgarde movements in Belgian art such as the Société Libre des Beaux-Arts founded on 1 March 1868 in Brussels, to which belonged Charles Hermans, Constantin Meunier, Louis Dubois, Félicien Rops, Alfred Verwee and Louis Artan de Saint-Martin belonged.

He died in Brussels on 27 April 1894. The funeral took place in the parish church of Saint-Josse-ten-Node on 1 May.

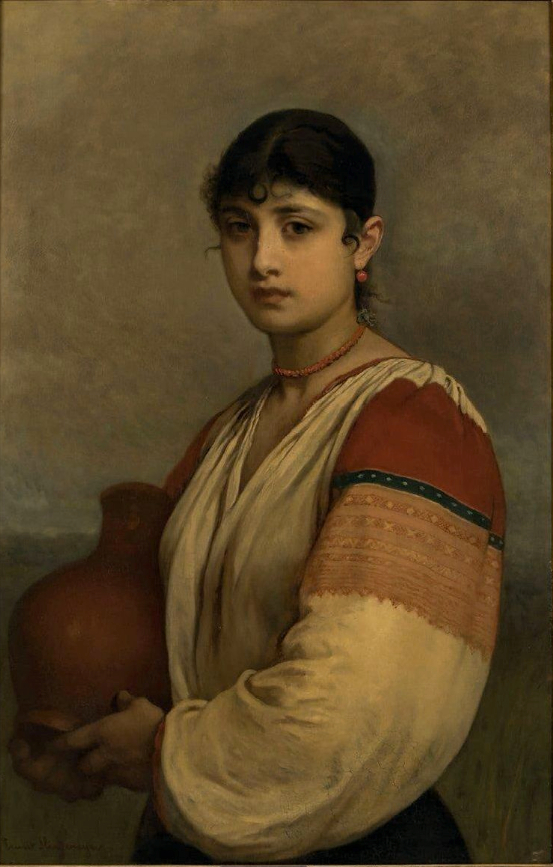
Oriental woman with a pitcher

== Work ==
Ernest Slingeneyer painted history paintings, portraits, Orientalist subjects, genre scenes and the occasional landscape. A prominent member of the Belgian Romantic-historical school of painting, he was also one of its most academic representatives. Unlike other Belgian Romantic painters he did not primarily treat subjects from Belgium's history unless he received a commission to do so. Rather, he explored subjects that allowed him to create dramatic scenes that combined acts of heroism with tragedy, such as in Le Vengeur, the deaths of the sea captains such as Jacobsen, Claessens, Nelson and Camoëns, the Christian martyr, etc. In the later part of his career he focused more on Belgian themes for his great historical pieces, as witnessed by his Cry of independence. The historical themes in the decoration of the Palace of the Academies were predominantly derived from Flemish history. The reason for this is the Belgian government's decision to start promoting monumental art in Belgium from the mid 1850s. The government provided financial assistance to artists on various projects. The promotion of monumental art dealing with episodes from the Belgian national history was regarded by the government of the young Belgian state as an important means of creating a national identity. The Belgian prime minister Charles Rogier was in particular in support of this movement. Jean-François Portaels and Jean Baptiste van Eycken, both pupils of François-Joseph Navez, helped launch the monumentalist movement in Belgium. They did this by introducing into Belgium new fresco techniques such as water glass painting, which they had studied abroad. The monumentalist movement was subsequently taken up by artists such as Jan Swerts and Godfried Guffens who had learned about the movement in Germany. In 1861, the development of monumental art gained momentum thanks to the award by the minister of the interior Charles Rogier of an annual budget allocation of 30,000 Belgian Francs to support this type of art. The sum was doubled in subsequent years. It is with these funds that the Belgian government was able to pay Slingeneyer the 122,000 Belgian Francs for the large Les Gloires de Belgique (The Glories of Belgium) and a series of twelve decorative panels with historical subjects for the great hall of the Academy Palace in Brussels.

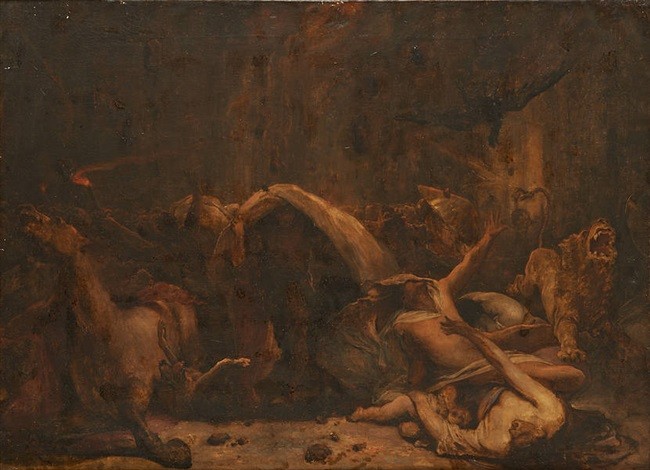
Symbolic scene

A commercially astute artist, Slingeneyer was able to adapt to the changing taste of the moneyed class of Belgium, which initially was liberal and partly favorable to the French Revolution, and also in awe of the major maritime nations of the time. This explains the subjects from French, Dutch, Portuguese and English maritime history to which Slingeneyer returned repeatedly early in his career. Around the significant anniversaries of Belgium (1855 and 1880), there was an outpouring of Belgian national feeling, while the French-speaking establishment also showed considerable sympathy for the Flemish (often medieval) past. It is in this context that Slingeneyer painted his series of works of portraits and scenes of Flemish medieval heroes such Nicolaas Zannekin, Jacob van Artevelde, Jan Breydel, Frans Anneessens, the Battle of Roosebeke. etc.

Slingeneyer was also an excellent portrait painter. Further he created countless genre pieces with themes from the folk culture of Italy and North Africa, which are about the only works of Slingeneyer that can still count on the interest of today's collectors. The titles of some of these works are Souvenir of Carthage (1872), the Bedouin woman, the Proud fisherman, the Orange seller, the Young Algerian woman, etc.

As his work had already been left behind by artistic developments in Belgium and abroad during his lifetime, his work fell quickly into oblivion after his death.
