= Charles Hermans =

Belgian painter

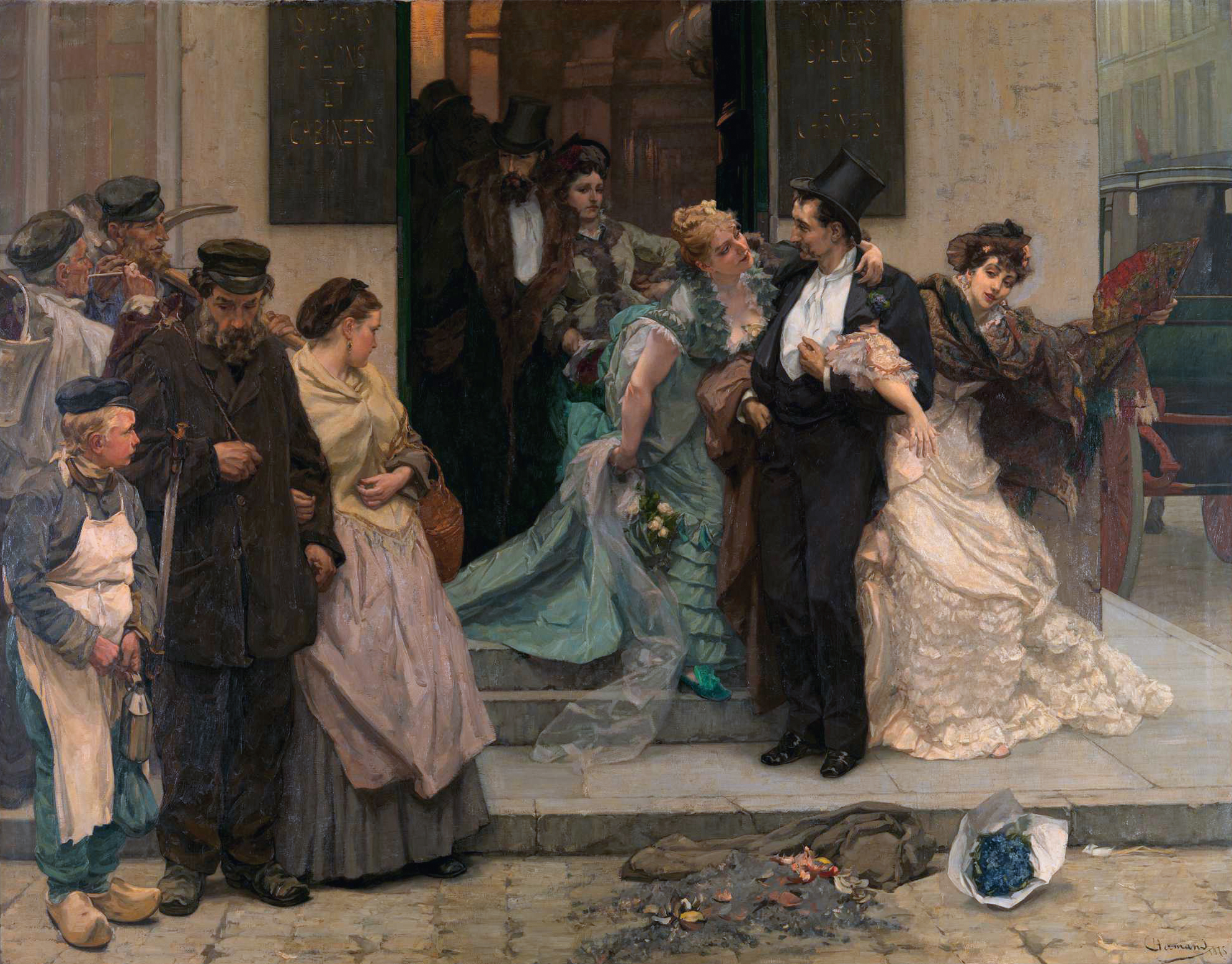
At dawn

Charles Hermans (7 August 1839 – 7 December 1924) was a Belgian painter of genre scenes, portraits, landscapes and some still lifes. Through a number of his monumental genre paintings he played an important role in the recognition of Realism in Belgian art.

== Life ==
Hermans was born in Brussels in a well-off bourgeois family. He showed an interest in art from an early age. In his native city Hermans received some artistic guidance from the painter Louis Gallait. He then studied at the Saint Luc workshop in Brussels, a liberal workshop which offered an alternative to traditional academic education. Between 1858 and 1861 he stayed in Paris where he studied at the workshop of the Swiss painter Charles Gleyre at the École nationale supérieure des Beaux-Arts. Gleyre was a prominent painter who had taken over the studio of Paul Delaroche in 1843 and taught a number of younger artists who became prominent, including Claude Monet, Pierre-Auguste Renoir, Alfred Sisley, and James Abbott McNeill Whistler.

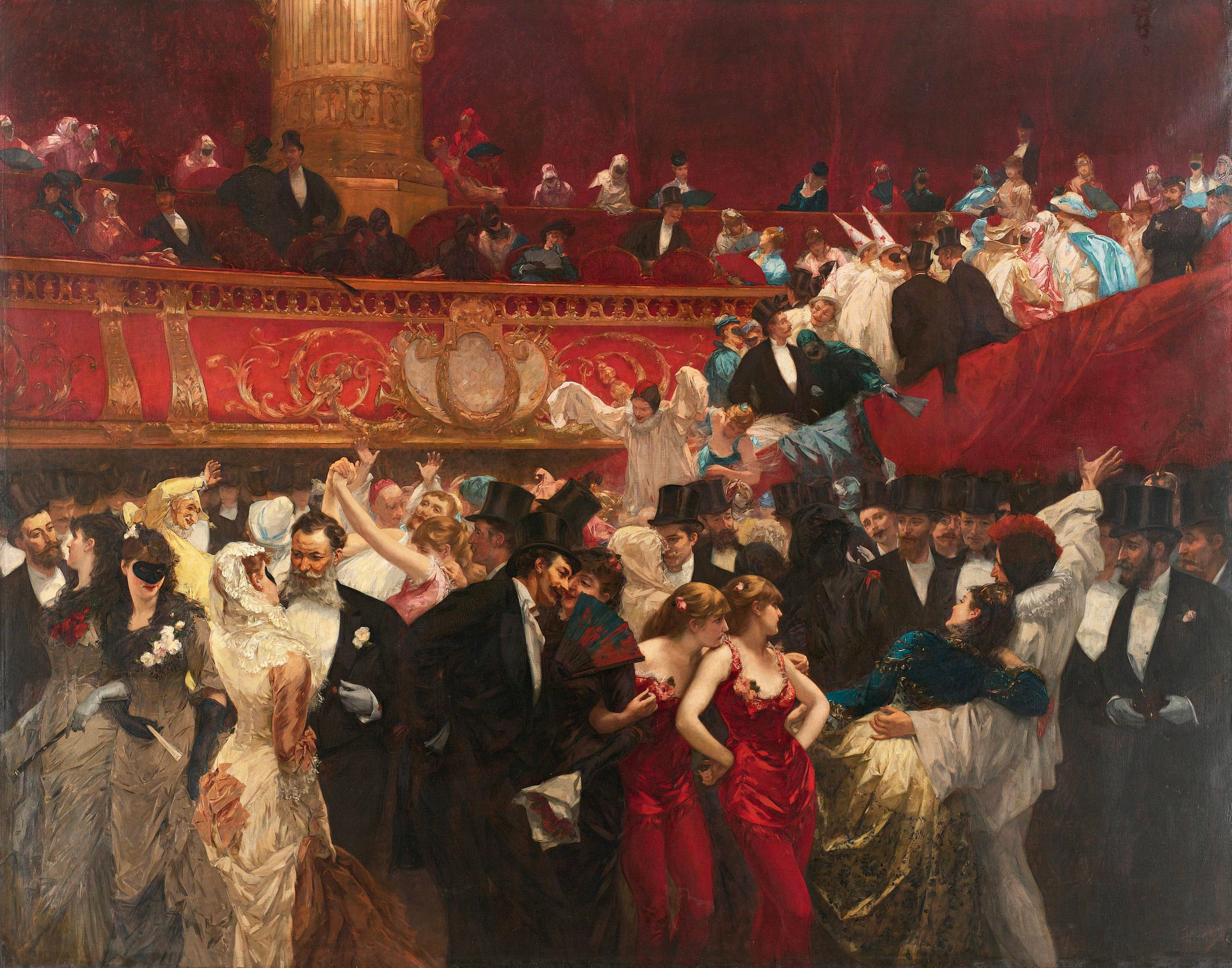
The Masked Ball, Chimei Museum, Tainan, Taiwan

From 1862 to 1867, Hermans stayed in Italy. In Rome he became fascinated with the life of the monks, which became a favorite subject of many paintings between 1866 and 1869. The theme of Catholic clergy was popular at the time as evidenced by the vogue of cardinal paintings made by artists such as the Belgian Georges Croegaert. He had an early success with his paintings of clerics. He later made several trips especially in the Mediterranean region and, in particular, Spain.

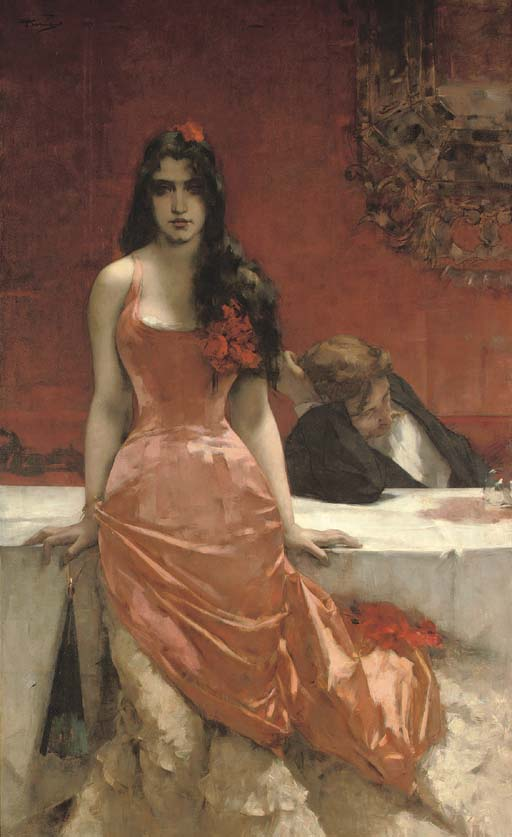
Circe the temptress

Hermans joined the Société Libre des Beaux-Arts, founded in Brussels on 1 March 1868, which brought together several famous Belgian naturalist artists such as Charles de Groux, Alfred Verwee, Constantin Meunier, Louis Dubois, Félicien Rops, Constantin Meunier, Louis Artan de Saint-Martin and Théodore Baron. The members admired the work of the French Realist painter Gustave Courbet and wished to confront the prevailing Academism in contemporary Belgian art. The Realist movement in Belgium gradually gained ground as evidenced by the fact that the Realist artists Constantin Meunier and Louis Artan de Saint-Martin received prizes at the Brussels Salon of 1869. The battle with the Belgian art establishment appeared to have been won when in 1875 Hermans' At dawn was accepted at the Brussels Salon without opposition.

Hermans participated in major international exhibitions such as the art section of the World Fair held in Paris in 1878 where he showed At dawn to general acclaim. He earned an international reputation thanks to this success. His paintings were acquired by museums, both in Belgium and abroad. Despite this early success Hermans was not able to realise the expectations. He had hoped to reiterate the reception of At dawn by creating the large, ambitious work The masked ball, which was exhibited at the Paris Salon of 1880. The impact of the work was less than that of his earlier work. Still many reproductions of it were made and the original was acquired by the Pennsylvania Academy of the Fine Arts in 1882.

Hermans died in Menton on 7 December 1924.

== Work ==
Hermans was a prolific artist who practised many genres throughout his career: history painting, genre art, portraits and landscape painting. He initially painted genre scenes of monks. He subsequently tried to elevate genre painting by treating biblical subjects as genre art. He painted a Job visited by his friends in which he depicted Job as an ordinary poor man in a Realist style. He then turned to genre scenes such as the Honeymoon showing a fashionable young couple clearly in love. He later turned to subjects with a social connotation such as the Sunday visit to the children's clinic at St. Peter's Hospital. In this composition he addressed human tragedy and suffering humanity in a moving and honest manner. The sentimentality of the subject assured the success of this composition.

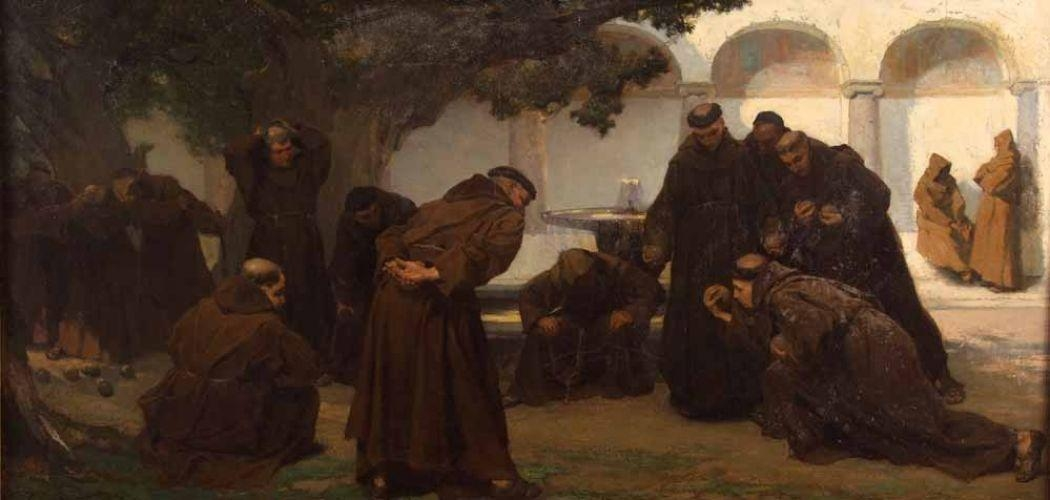
Monks playing bowls

The crowning achievement of his genre art was the work of 1875 At dawn. It is a realistic and moralizing painting representing an encounter of a group of inebriated revellers leaving a restaurant with prostitutes on their arms in the early hours and a group of poor labourers on their way to work. The work was interpreted as a work of social criticism by contrasting the honest, simple workers with the depraved bourgeoisie. Hermans himself denied that his intention was to engage in social criticism and argued that he chose the subject because of its artistic possibilities.

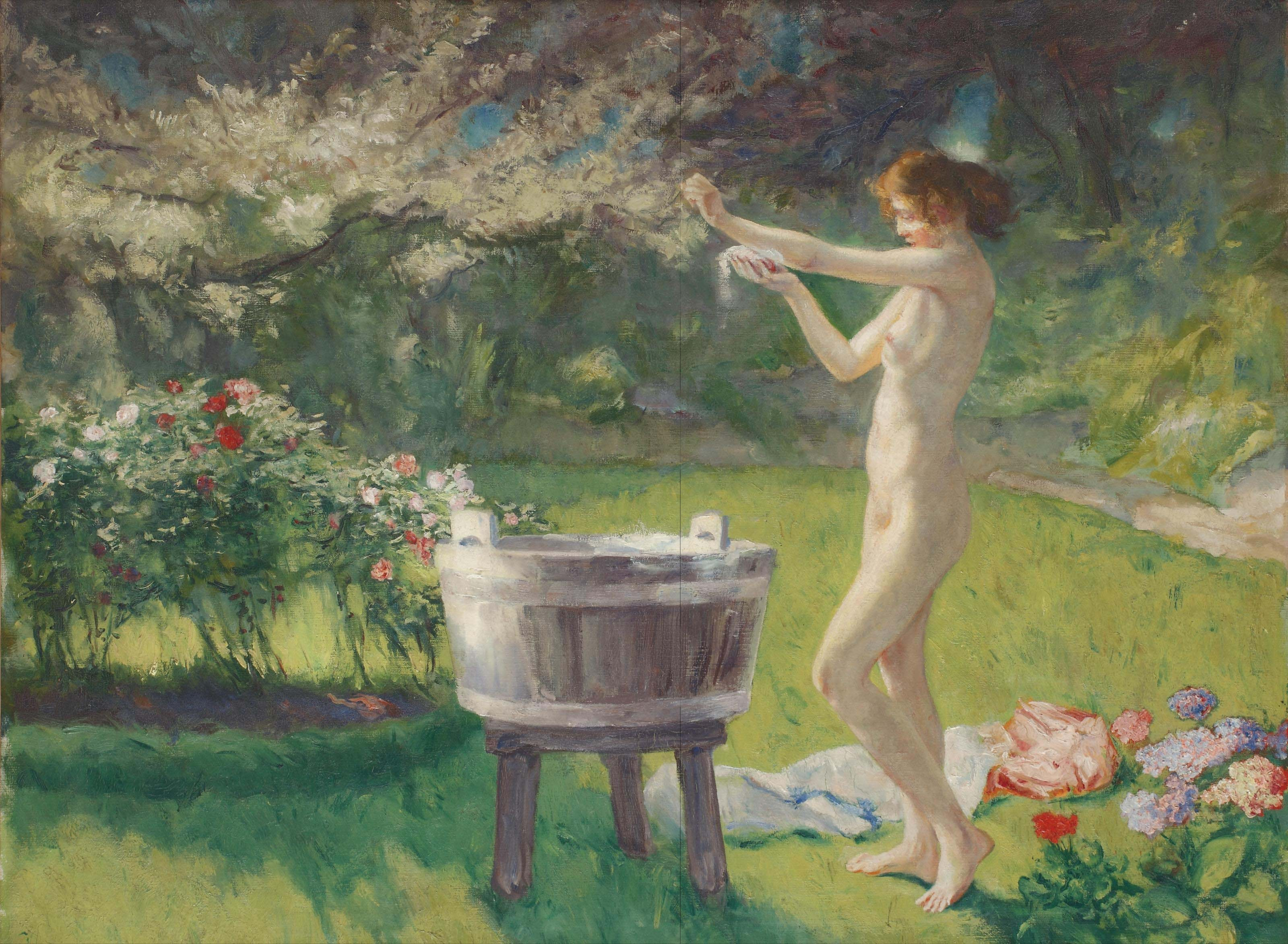
Bath in the garden

Hermans followed up this masterwork with other smaller genre pieces until he attempted another genre scene on a large scale, The masked ball. This work depicts one of the all-night society masked balls of the late 19th century, which were also attended by young women of the demi-monde. The composition shows a large room filled with groups of partygoers some of whom are in the shadows looking from a balcony in the background while others are active on the crowded dance floor in the front. Elegantly dressed men are joined by many women on the dance floor some in close embrace or animated conversation. Many of the men depicted were prominent personalities of the time. Hermans was able to convey with a remarkable skill the jostling and carnival madness of a night at the theater.

Not achieving the expected success with this work, Hermans turned to smaller scale works often depicting charming women, which were based on the studies he had made for the Masked ball. These works are in the same vein as the society portraits of Alfred Stevens. He also painted at the sea from which he returned with fantasies of nude women bathing and Bacchantes. A new high point of this period is the composition Circe as temptress, which shows a seductive woman in a modern interior with a man passed out at a table with an overturned wine glass. This was a return to the veiled social criticism of his earlier work. In his later years he painted large decorative works and landscapes with many figures. During World War I he treated some wartime subjects such as The martyrs and the Execution of Edith Cavell by the Germans.

Hermans' large-format Realist works were influential on the next generation of Belgian artists such as Eugène Laermans and Léon Frédéric.

== Gallery ==
Works of Charles Hermans

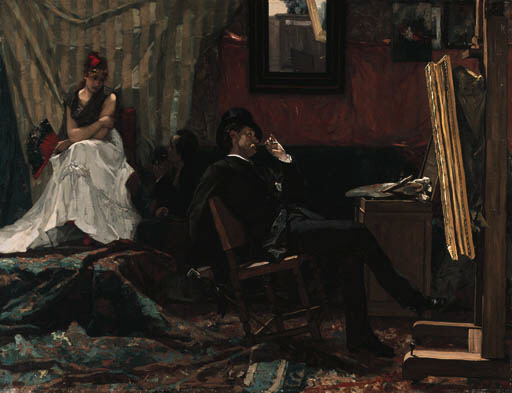
The connoisseur

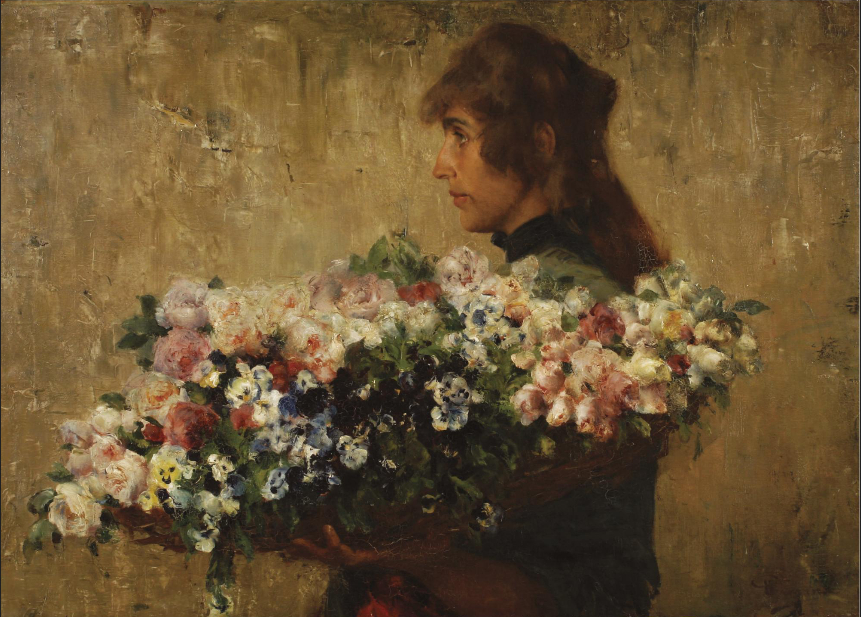
The flower seller

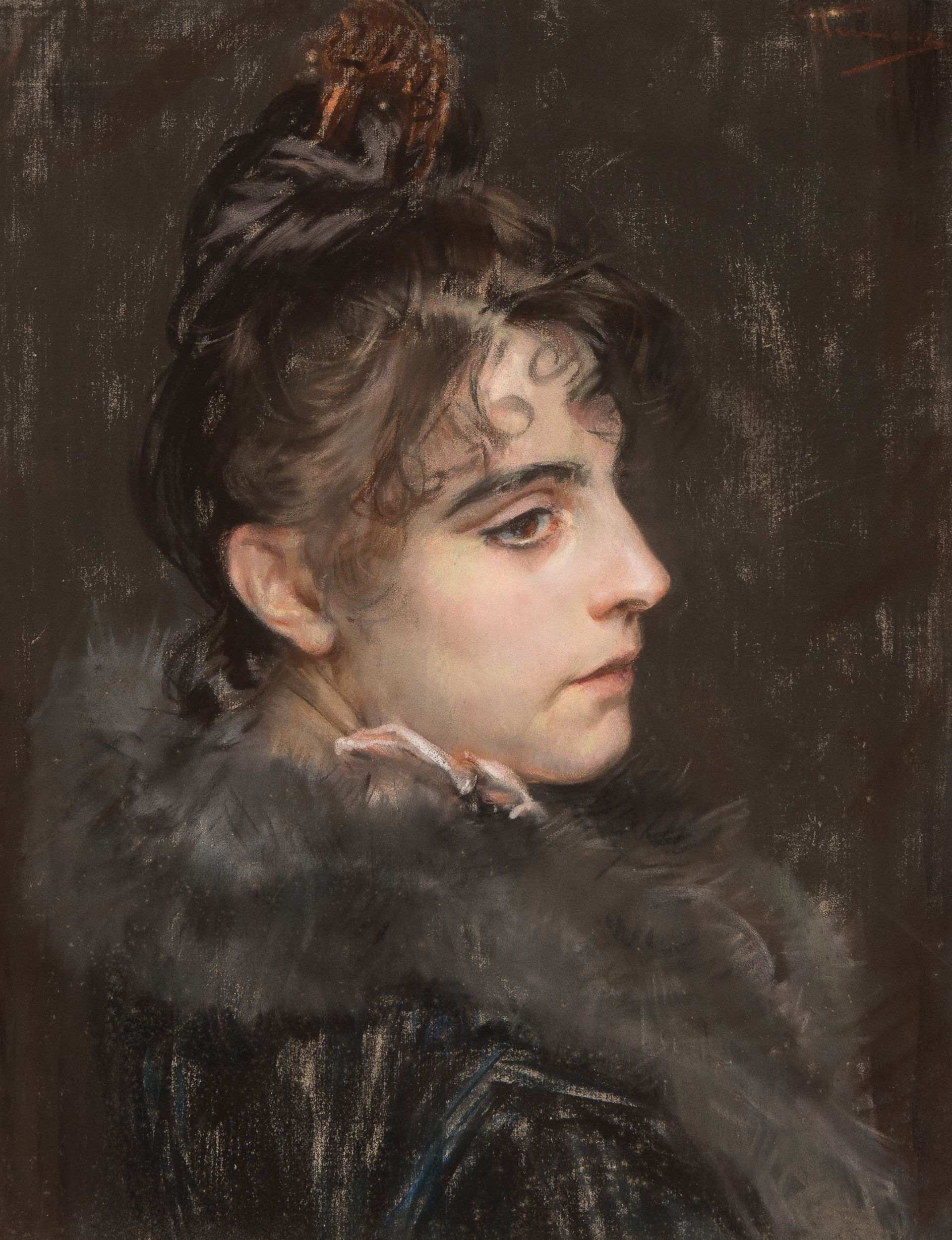
Portrait of a lady

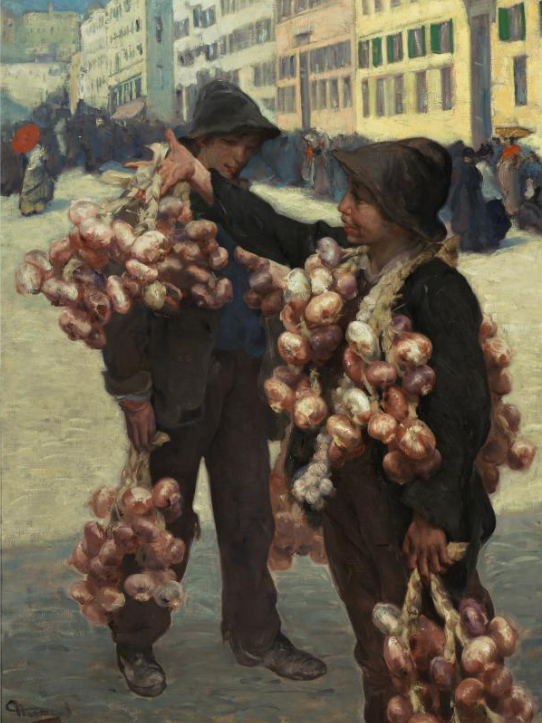
The onion sellers

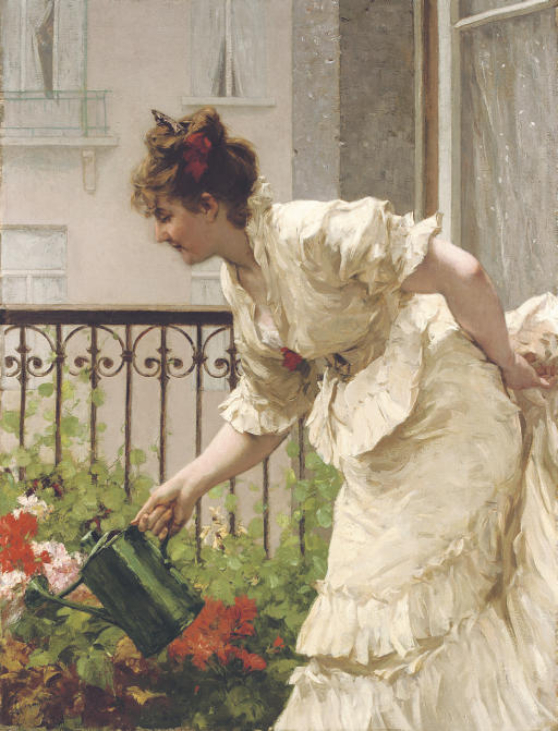
A secret admirer

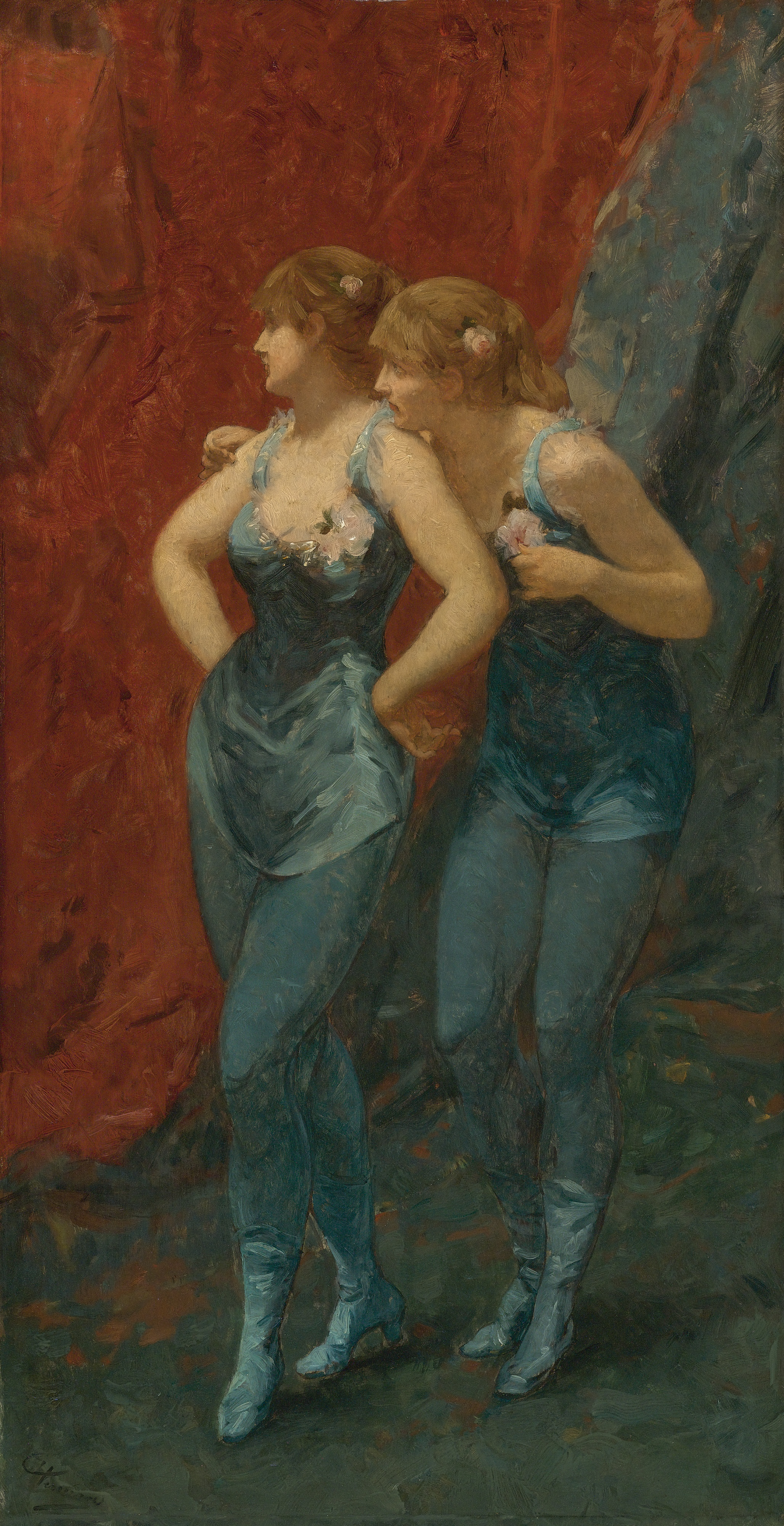
Two dancers

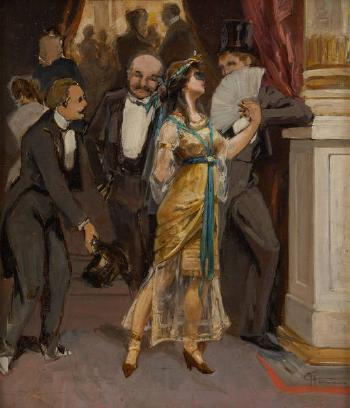
Sketch for the Masked Ball
