= Théodore Baron =

19th-century Belgian landscape painter

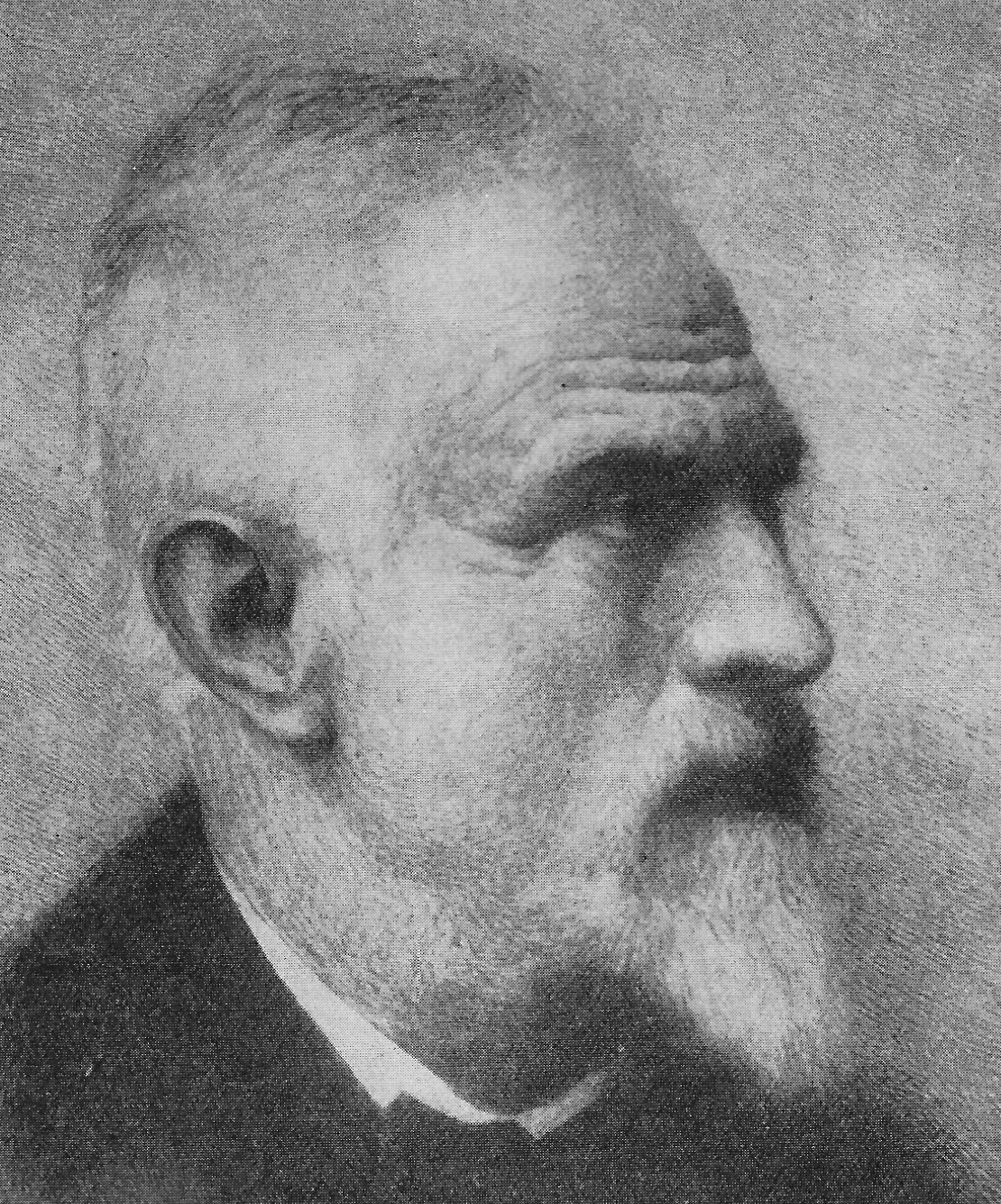
- Théodore Baron (date unknown)
- Born: Théodore Baron; 19 July 1840; Ixelles, Brussels, Belgium
- Died: 4 September 1899 (aged 59); Saint-Servais, Belgium
- Education: Genkse School
- Occupation: Painter

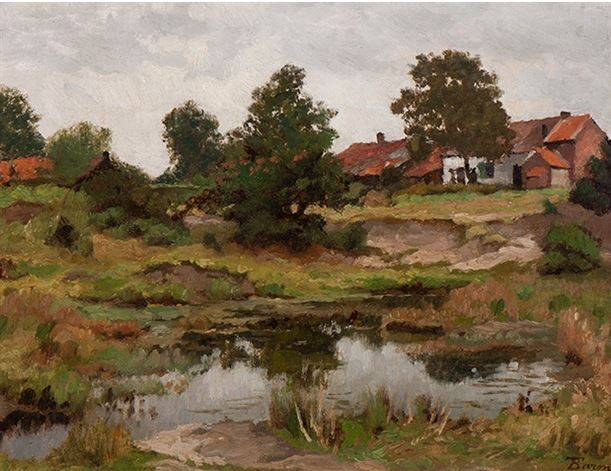
View of a Pond, with Houses

Théodore Baron (19 August 1840 - 4 September 1899) was a Belgian landscape painter in the Realistic style.

== Biography ==
He was initially trained in the Academic style; first by Hippolyte de la Charlerie in Brussels, then by Louis Dubois, Guillaume Van der Hecht, and François-Joseph Navez. By 1860, he was already working at the artists' colony in Genk, making him a member of the Genkse School. In 1863, together with Louis Artan, he explored the wooded areas around Brussels and came into contact with artists painting en plein aire. During that time, he developed a predilection for creating more realistic landscapes than those he had studied.

From 1865 to 1868, he lived in Kalmthout and focused on painting the typically desolate landscapes found in the Campine region. There, he met a group of like-minded artists; Jacques Rosseels (1828–1912), Isidore Meyers, Adrien-Joseph Heymans and Florent Crabeels, generally referred to as the Kalmhoutse School. He returned to Brussels in 1868, and renewed his ties with the artists in Tervuren, thereby creating a link between the Kalmhoutse and the School van Tervuren. He also spent some time working in Hoeilaart and Auderghem, painting the old ponds in the vicinity of the Red Cloister. That same year, he became a co-founder of the Société Libre des Beaux-Arts.

He was constantly moving about; painting in the Meuse river valley and along the river Lesse. He also worked with Félicien Rops and Octave Maus at an artists' retreat in Anseremme. In 1870, he stayed with the art critic, Camille Lemonnier, at his home near Profondeville. Later, he travelled as far as France and Italy.

In 1882, he became a teacher at the Academy of Fine Arts in Namur, replacing Ferdinand Marinus. His best known students there include Isidore Verheyden and Hippolyte de la Charlerie. In 1884, he was appointed the academy's Director, and remained in that position until his death. Streets have been named after him in Auderghem and Namur where a monument, created by Charles van der Stappen, has been erected.

== Sources ==
- Herman De Vilder, "De School van Tervuren : in de bedding van de tijd"; De Vrienden van de School van Tervuren, 2008 ISBN 978-90-805835-04
- Hoozee R., "Barbizon en België"; in: "De School van Barbizon"; exhibition catalog, Museum voor Schone Kunst, Ghent 1985 ISBN 90-6730-020-9
- Paul Piron, De Belgische beeldende kunstenaars uit de 19de en 20ste eeuw, 2nd ed., 1999, ISBN 978-90-7667-601-2
- E. Benezit, Dictionnaire des Peintres, Sculpteurs, Dessinateurs et Graveurs; Librairie Gründ, Paris 1976 ISBN 2-7000-0151-6
