= Louis Dubois (painter) =

Belgian painter

- Born: Louis Dubois ca. 1830; Brussels, Belgium
- Died: ca. 1880; Brussels, Belgium
- Occupation: Painter

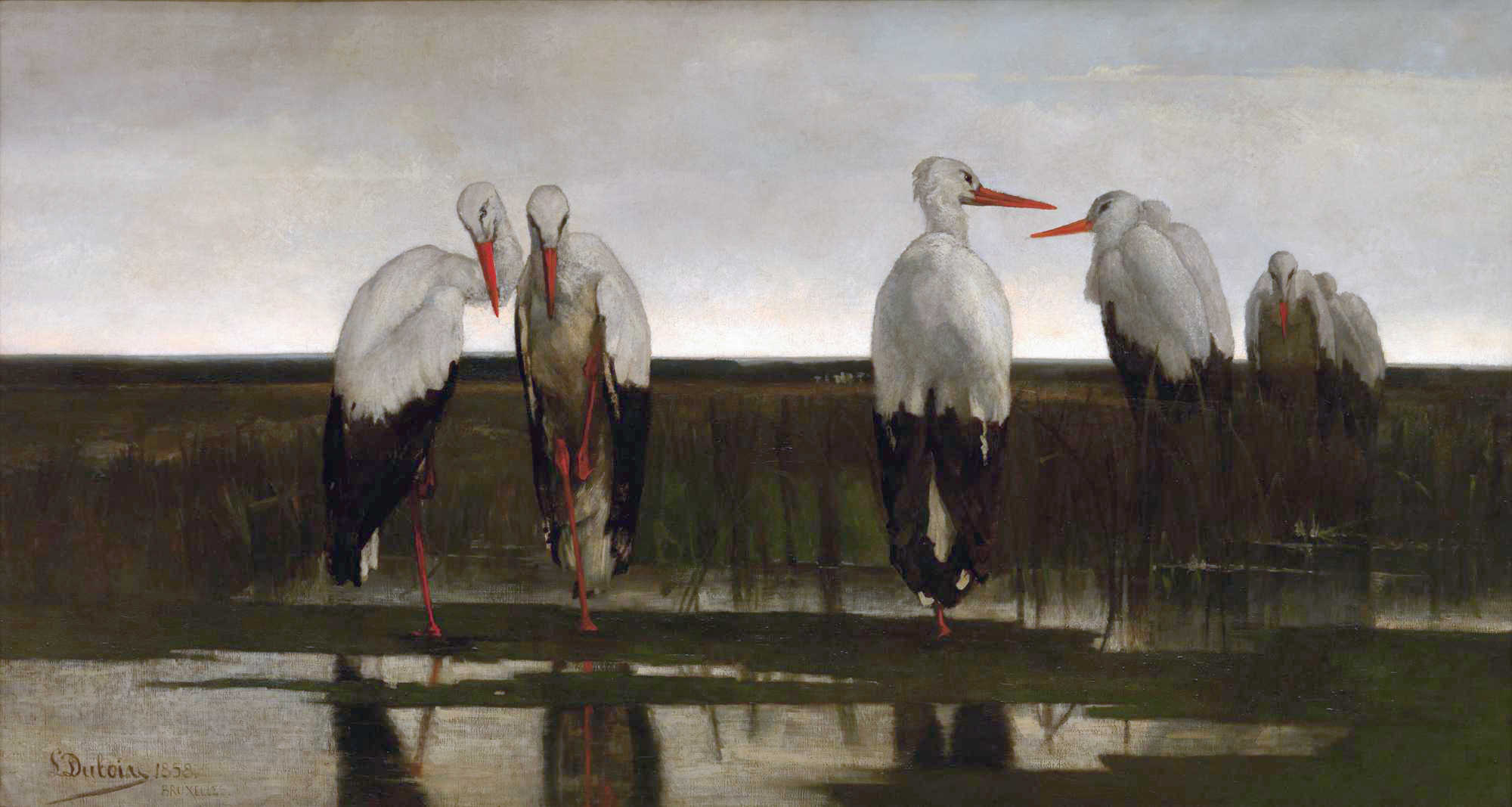
The Storks, 1858, now in the Royal Museums of Fine Arts of Belgium

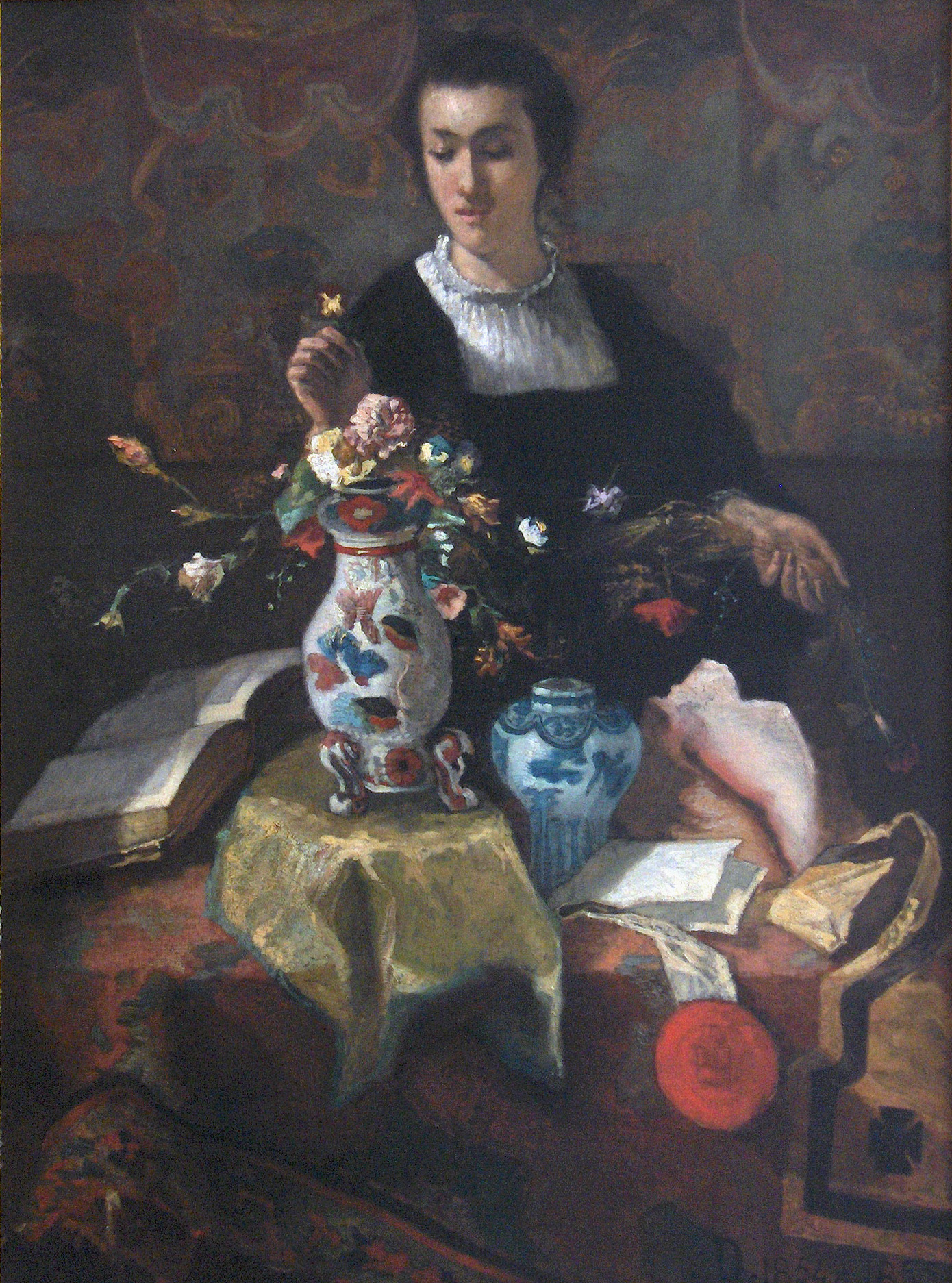
The Lady with Bouquet, 1854–1855, now in the Royal Museums of Fine Arts of Belgium

Louis Dubois (1830–1880) was a Belgian painter who specialized in landscapes and portraits in a naturalistic style. He also painted genre and still-life subjects and is associated with multiple publications of art criticism.

== Personal life ==
Louis Dubois was born in 1830 in Brussels, Belgium. He died of a respiratory illness in Brussels in 1880 at age 50.

== Free Society for the Fine Arts ==
Louis Dubois belonged to a group of artists who, in the style of the second half the 19th century, rebelled against the traditional painting of the past in favor of naturalism. With the painters Théodore Baron, Louis Artan, Edmond Lambrichs, and F. Foudin, on March 1, 1868, founded of La Société Libre des Beaux-Arts ("the Free Society for the Fine Arts").

The society was officially established in 1868 as "Comité de Salut Public révolutionnaire, pour la libération de l'Art," according to Lucien Solvay. The society members scorned the rules of the Academy and the aesthetics of the time. The artists of the Free Society for the Fine Arts' interpretation of nature and reality didn't following a common discipline but was led instead by their motto of "Liberté et Sincerité" ("freedom and sincerity"), which caused controversy.

To spread their realist philosophy, in 1871 the group created "L'Art Libre" an art and literary journal under Leon Dommartin's direction. It was published on the 1st and 15th of each month, the first issue being released on 15 December 1871. Louis Dubois was the principal illustrator and the only painter-editor—and the most argumentative. Under the pseudonym "Hout" (the Dutch translation of "Dubois"), he lampooned traditional painting.

== Criticism ==
On January 1, 1872, Dubois published "Les Biographes et les Biographies," a critique of his professional enemies, the Romantics of the school of 1830. It was published again in "L'Art Moderne, Revue artistique des Arts et de la Litterature" No. 24 of the publication's 4th year, June 15, 1884.

Dubois continued to publish a number of articles. On February 1 and March 1, 1872, in "Le Peintre d'Histoire," he spoke against painters of the "Modern Era." On July 15 and August 15, 1872, in "Du Portrait," he criticized official portraits. And on September 15 and October 1, 1872, in his article "Du Procédé," Dubois said, "paint as you like... provided that you use true tones, in the right places."

On February 11, 1873, after 10 years of publication, the Review underwent a transformation, expanding under the title "L'Art Universel," appointing Camille Lemonnier as the director. "Hout" then published an article "A propos des peintres du rire" about Frans Hals, Jordeans, and Jan Steen.

Dubois is also considered to have authored articles attributed to "Karl Stur," one in "L'Art Libre" and one in the daily newspaper "La Chronique" ("Causerie"), during the years 1870–1871.

== Paintings and exhibitions ==
Dubois worked in Paris at Thomas Couture's studio, which was active from 1847 to 1863.

Dubois exhibited for the first time at the Brussels Exhibition of 1857 where he showed three paintings "Joueurs" (Players), "Embuscade" (Ambush), and "Prêtre allant célébrer la Masse" (Priests going to celebrate Mass).

At an 1860 show, Dubois showed 1858's "Les Cigognes" (The Storks), which was also shown at Spa in 1860, and "La Roulette," both of which today hang in the Royal Museum of Fine Arts in Brussels, as well as the study "Enfant de choeur" (Choir Child). "Enfant de choeur" remained in his family and is now on display in Maui, Hawaii in the home of his great-great granddaughter Maureen Vernon Breen. In 1863 he showed "Solitude" (formerly "Le Chevreuil mort," or "dead deer"), which is also now on display in the Royal Museum in Brussels and shows the aforementioned dead animal outstretched in the middle of a silent forest.

Twenty one of Dubois' his students' paintings were displayed at the 1880 Brussels Artistic and Literary Circle and in 1891 at the Arts and Press Expo.

== Associates ==
Among his friends, Dubois counted Courbet, Louis Artan, Félicien Rops, Constantin Meunier, Alfred Verwee, and Joseph Coosemans. Alfred Verhaeren, Jean-François Taelemans, and Théodore Baron were his students, and Frans Van Leemputten followed his influence.

At Couture's studio, he found himself in the company of an association of young painters gathered to work together including Félicien Rops, Charles Hermans, Constantin Meunier, and Jules Raeymaeckers, all among the attendees of the "Atelier Libre Saint-Luc" in Brussels from 1853 to 1863, then directed by Slingeneyer.

== Reception and legacy ==
Camille Lemonnier wrote, "Master Louis Dubois, I saved him for last, like a hot pepper for a bored palate. Zounds! What painting! I recognized the power of another with distinction." Edmond About said about him, "he was the most distinguished painter working in Belgium."

The Ostende Fine Arts Museum displayed three of his paintings, but they were destroyed during World War II.

Dubois' works were also displayed at the:

- 1905 Belgian Art Retrospective in Brussels
- 1906 at the Belgian Art Exhibition at Guild Hall in London
- 1907 Belgium Autumn Art Show in Paris
- 1910 Brussels Show: The Free Aesthetic Evolution of a Landscape (5 panels)
- 1920, at Anvers: Chosen Work of the Belgian Masters (4 paintings)
- 1922 Brussels Artistic and Literary Circle (5 panels)
- 1923 Belgian Art Show, in Paris
- 1926 Belgian Art Show, in Bern
- 1927 Belgian Art Show, in London
- 1930 Centennial Art Expo of Belgian Art in Brussels, at the Third Salon at Namur
- 1931 Belgian Art Show in Copenhagen
- 1932 Brussels Fine Arts Palace, Retrospective of the Masters of La Societe Libre des Beaux-Arts (Artan, Dubois, De Grouz, Verwee, Meunier, Rops, Baron, Smits) (61 paintings)
- 1935 Brussels Universal and International Expo, "Five Centuries of Art" (3 paintings)
- Belgian Art Show at Expo of the Century
- Expo of Women's Portraits in Brussels

The Brussels Museum has 15 of Dubois' works on display; the Ixelles Fine Arts Museum displays five paintings; the Charlier-Van Custen Museum displays three paintings; the Gand Fine Arts Museum displays three works; and the Tournai Fine Arts Museum has Dubois in its collection as well.
