= Joseph Quinaux =

Belgian painter (1822–1895)

- Born: Joseph Quinaux; 29 March 1822; Namen, Belgium
- Died: 24 May 1895 (aged 73); Schaerbeek, Belgium
- Education: Académie Royale des Beaux-Arts of Brussels
- Occupation: Painter

Joseph Quinaux (French pronunciation: [ʒozɛf kino]; 29 March 1822 – 24 May 1895) was a Belgian painter, known especially for his landscapes.

Quinaux was born in Namen. He was a lecturer and teacher of painting at the Académie Royale des Beaux-Arts of Brussels from 1876 until his death in Schaerbeek in 1895, conducting the landscape class. Among his pupils were Hippolyte Boulenger and Isidore Verheyden. The Rue Quinaux in Schaerbeek was named after him.
