= Hippolyte de la Charlerie =

- Born: Hippolyte de la Charlerie ca. 1827; Mons, United Kingdom of the Netherlands
- Died: ca. 1869; Ixelles, Belgium
- Occupation: Painter

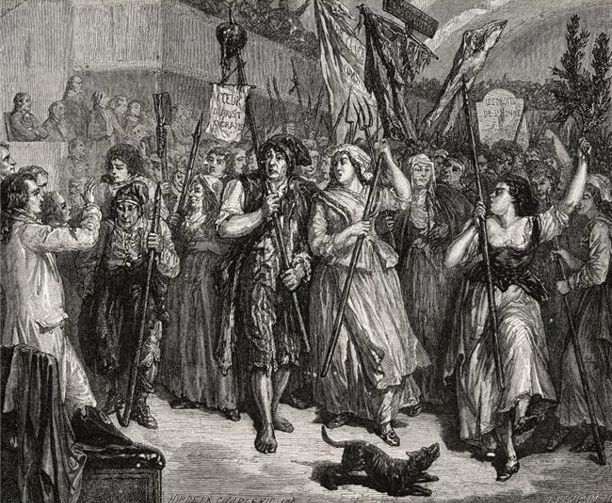
"Invasion of the Assembly in 1792"; illustration from La Révolution Française (1862) by M.J.G.D Armengaud

Hippolyte de la Charlerie (1827–1869) was a Belgian painter and illustrator.

== Life and work ==
De la Charlerie was born in Mons. He studied art at the Académie Royale des Beaux-Arts (1843–51) and with Théodore Baron. He was a co-founder of the Atelier Saint-Luc at Brussels, but spent much of his time in Paris, where he established himself as an illustrator for collectors' editions of books. Among his engravings are scenes of the French Revolution, which he also created for La Révolution Française (1862) by M.J.G.D Armengaud.

De la Charlerie is also noted for a painting of the 17th-century composer and musician Jean-Baptiste Lully which was well received at the Salon of Paris in 1869. Lully is shown as a boy of around twelve years old playing his violin in the kitchen of the Duchesse de Montpensier, his patroness.

In 1868, de la Charlerie was one of the founding members of the avant-gardist Société Libre des Beaux-Arts, but died only a year later in Ixelles, a fashionable suburb of Brussels favoured by artists. When some of his smaller canvases were part of a retrospective exhibition of Belgian art in 1905, Octave Maus writing in L'Art Moderne praised him among unjustly neglected painters whose works evidenced freshness and sincerity, the latter quality being one of the Société's ideals. His portraits have been described as having an "austere simplicity," using dark and chilly tonalities that emphasize the model's immobility.
