= Isidore Verheyden =

Belgian painter (1846–1905)

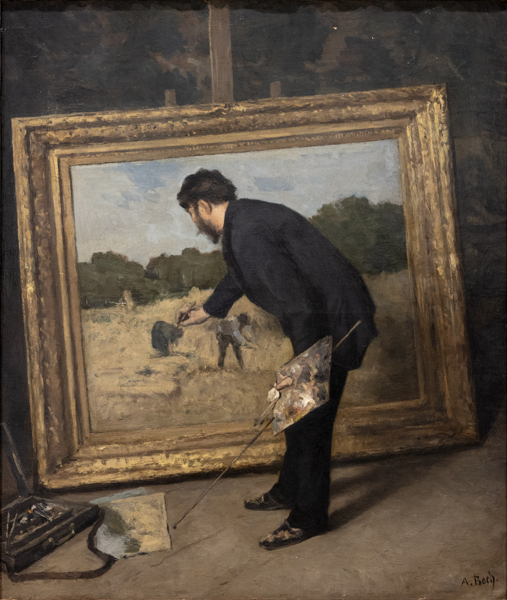
- Verheyden (by Anna Boch)
- Born: Isidore Verheyden; 24 January 1846; Antwerp, Belgium
- Died: 1 November 1905 (aged 59); Elsene, Belgium
- Education: Académie Royale des Beaux-Arts of Brussels
- Occupation: Painter
- Relatives: Jean-François Verheyden (father)

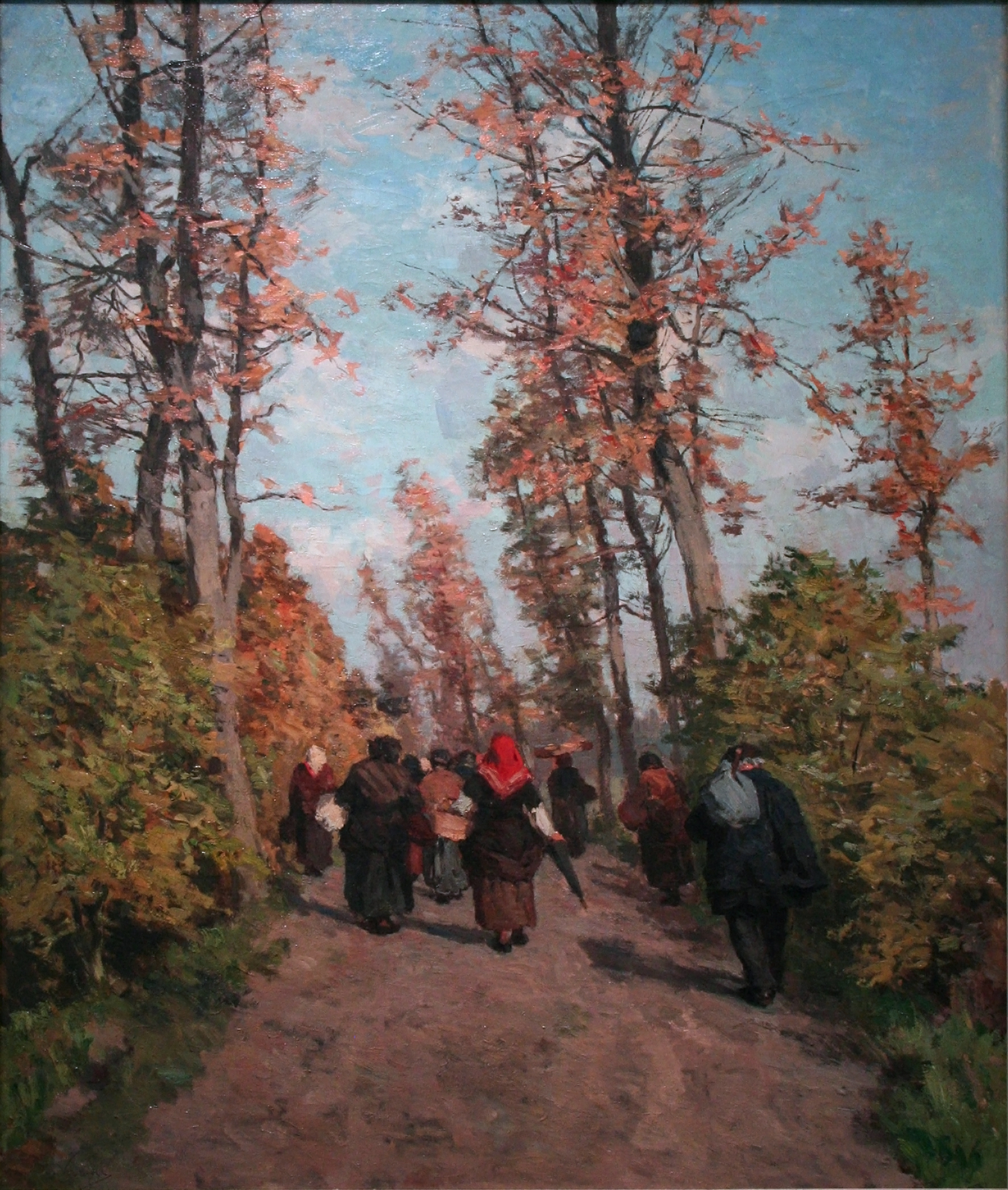
Return from the Market, M - Museum Leuven

Isidore Verheyden (24 January 1846 in Antwerp – 1 November 1905 in Elsene) was a Belgian painter of landscapes, portraits and still life.

He was the son of painter Jean-François Verheyden; his first teacher at the Académie Royale des Beaux-Arts of Brussels was Joseph Quinaux, and in 1866 he entered the studio of Jean-François Portaels for further study. He also studied under the landscape painter Théodore Baron; he in turn taught Anna Boch.

Verheyden was a founding member of the anti-academic Société Libre des Beaux-Arts in 1868, and a member of Les XX from 1884 to 1886.
