= Guillaume Van der Hecht =

Belgian painter (1817–1891)

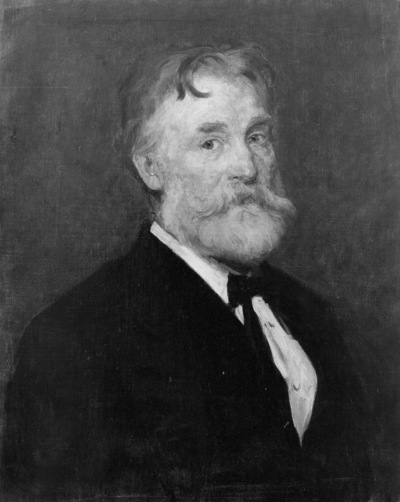
Guillaume Van der Hecht; portrait by Liévin De Winne

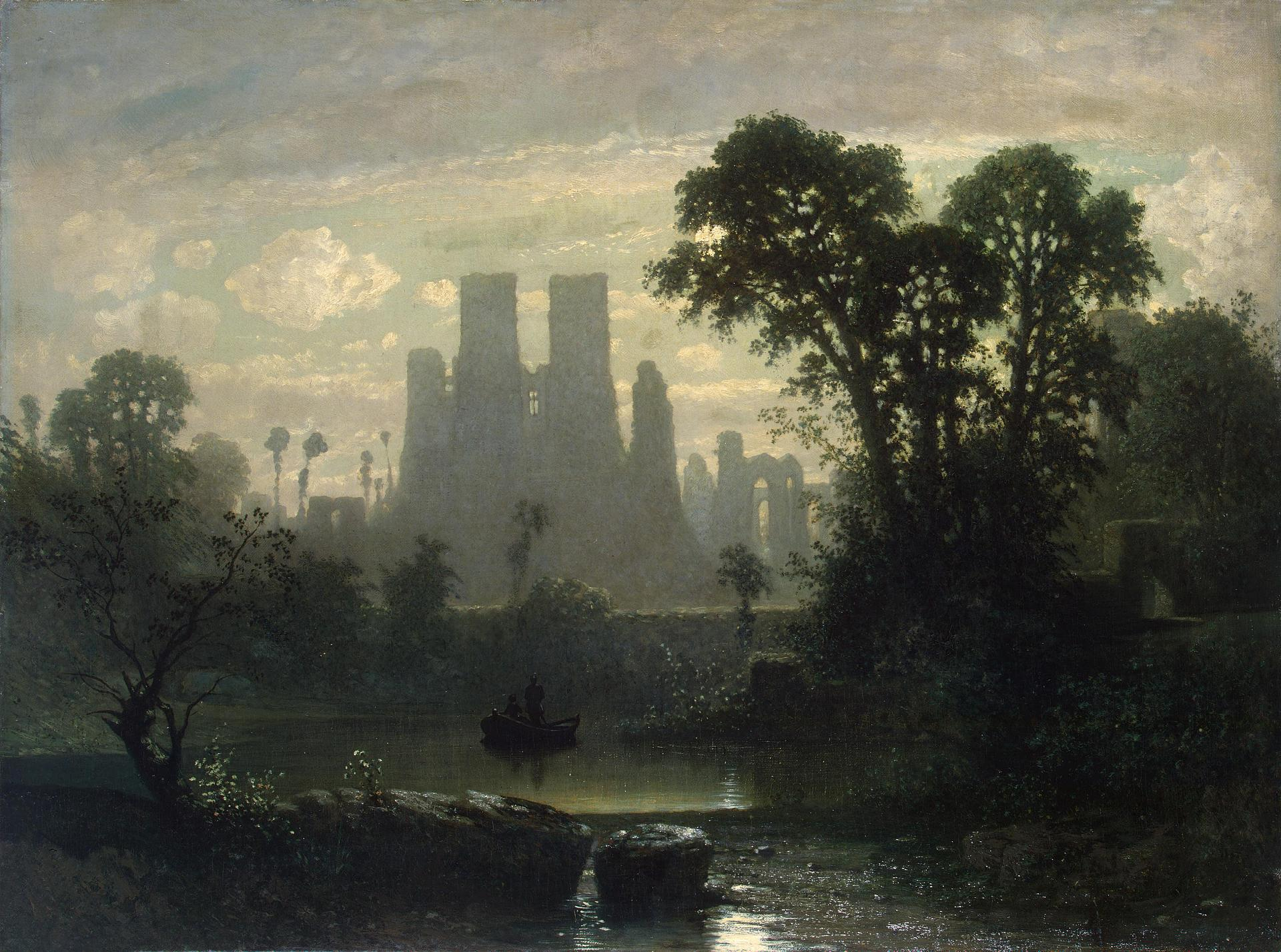
The Ruins of Kenilworth Castle

Guillaume Victor Van der Hecht (30 June 1817, Brussels - 10 September 1891, Brussels) was a Belgian landscape painter, lithographer and designer; in the Romantic style.

== Life and work ==
He was born to Joseph Van der Hecht, a locksmith, and his wife Barbe Françoise, née Schneider. He became a student at the Académie Royale des Beaux-Arts in 1827, and began receiving commissions while still very young. In the mid-1840s, he worked in London, where he continued his studies and served as an assistant to Charles Baugniet. He returned to Belgium around 1850. It was then that he began working as an illustrator; becoming a major contributor to the fine arts journal, La Renaissance, which was discontinued in 1855.

Although he created numerous landscapes and watercolors, most of his output was in the form of engravings and designs. He was especially attracted to scenes with castles and monuments.

He also worked as an art teacher at the Belgian Royal Court during the 1850s. In 1870, he was hired to teach painting to Princess Marie of Hohenzollern-Sigmaringen. He gave his nephew, Henri Van der Hecht (1841-1901), his first art lessons.
