= Louis Artan =

Dutch painter (1837–1890)

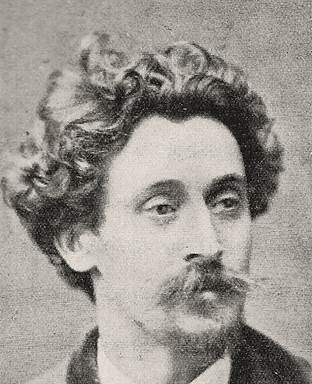
- Artan (1870s)
- Born: Louis Victor Antonio Artan de Saint-Martin; 20 April 1837; The Hague, Netherlands
- Died: 23 May 1890 (aged 53); Nieuwpoort, Belgium
- Occupations: Painter and etcher

Louis Victor Antonio Artan de Saint-Martin (20 April 1837 – 23 May 1890) was a Dutch-Belgian painter and etcher who specialized in seascapes.

== Biography ==
He was born into a noble family in The Hague. His father was an army officer who served as an adjutant to Prince Frederick. In 1842, his family moved to Ixelles and acquired Belgian citizenship. His father died later that same year and the family moved to Brussels. Artan began training for a military career, but quit when he was twenty and spent the next six years travelling through the Ardennes, making nature studies. During this time, he became friends with Edouard Delvaux and, after 1858, began visiting Paris, where he was influenced by the Barbizon school and the French marine painter, Eugène Boudin. Although he took some lessons from Delvaux, he remained largely self-taught.

He returned to Belgium in 1860, married the following year, and settled in Ixelles. There, he was further influenced by the landscape painter Hippolyte Boulenger, who took him on a tour of the Sonian Forest in Tervuren. In 1864, an economic depression resulted in the loss of his family fortune and he had to depend entirely upon painting for his income. Despite this, he remained restless and spent the years 1867–1868 exploring Brittany and the shores of the English Channel. When he returned home, he became one of the sixteen co-founders the Société Libre des Beaux-Arts, an association opposed to the stylistic hegemony of the academies and salons. From 1873 to 1874, Artan lived in Antwerp, where he joined with a group of progressive painters who were fighting the influence of the Academy of Fine Arts. In 1875, he shared a studio with Félicien Rops in Paris, then settled briefly in Berck-sur-Mer, where he created some of his best-known works. After 1880, he worked in a more impressionistic style. In 1881, he became a Knight in the Order of Leopold. Two years later, he was awarded a gold medal at the International Colonial and Export Exhibition in Amsterdam.

He spent his last years living in De Panne and died nearby in Nieuwpoort of influenza during the 1889–1890 pandemic, at the age of fifty-three. His tombstone was designed by Victor Horta.

== Gallery ==
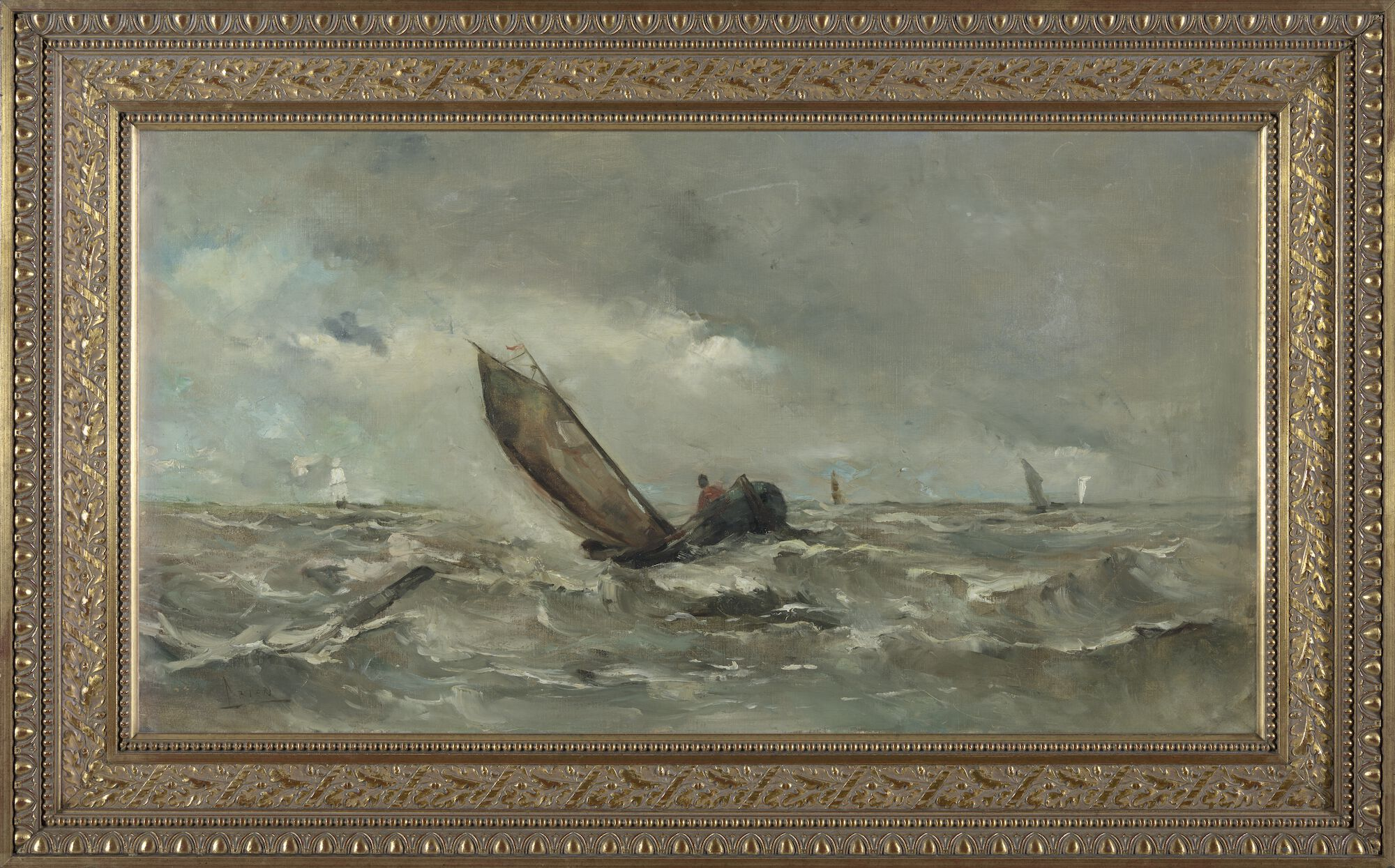
Boat in the storm NAVIGO National Fisheries Museum

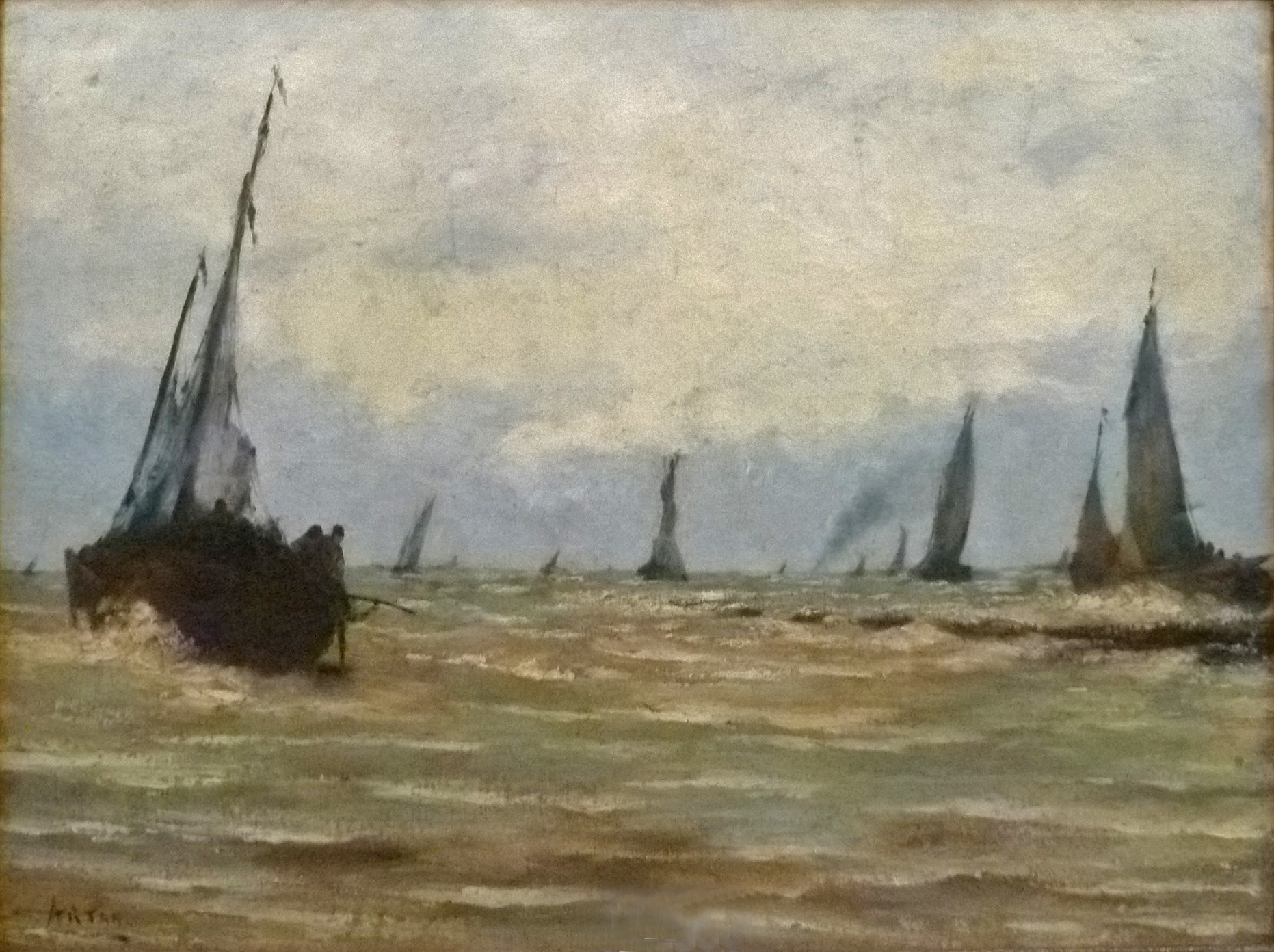
Seascape with Fishing Boats

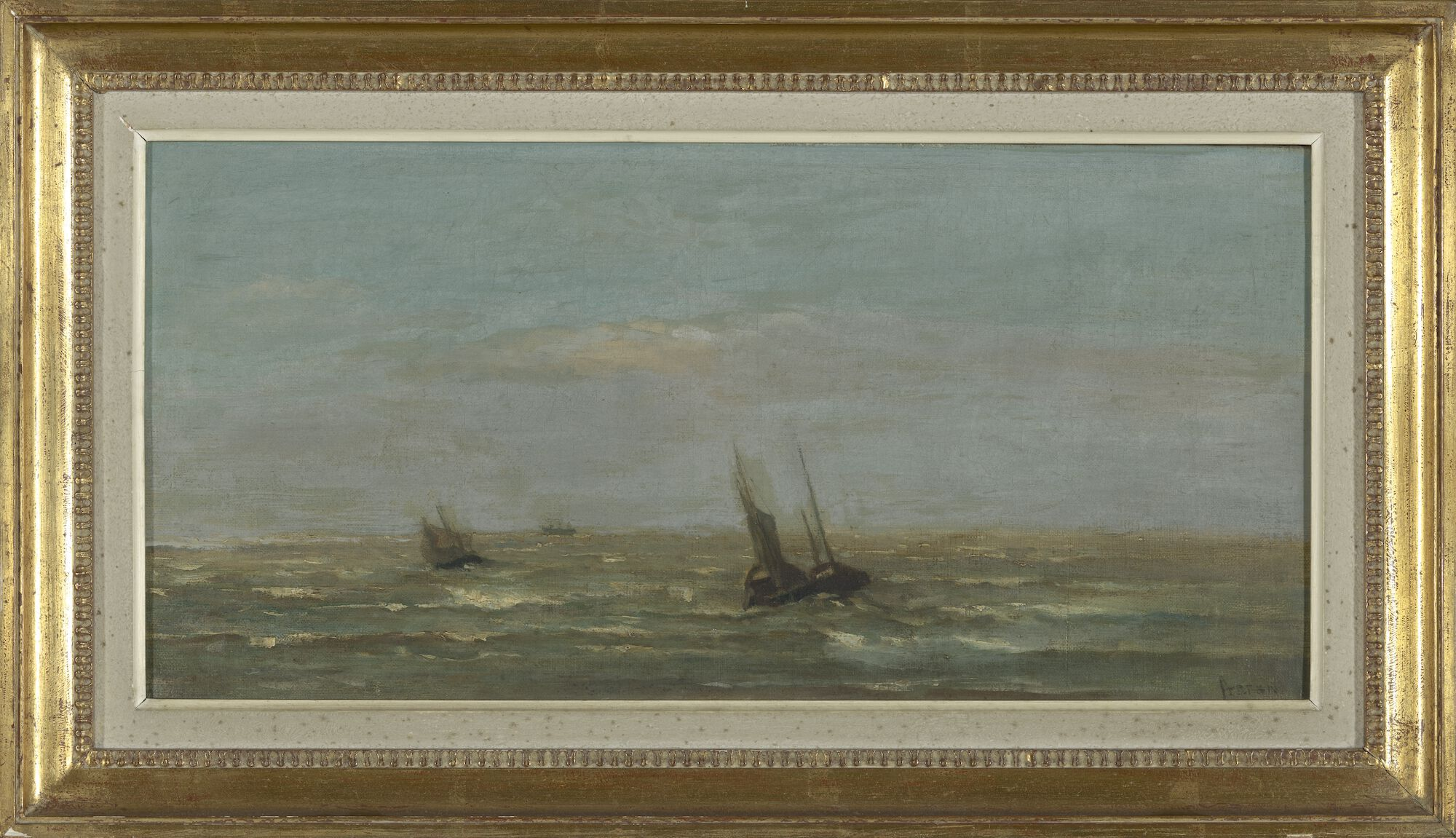
Vessels at sea

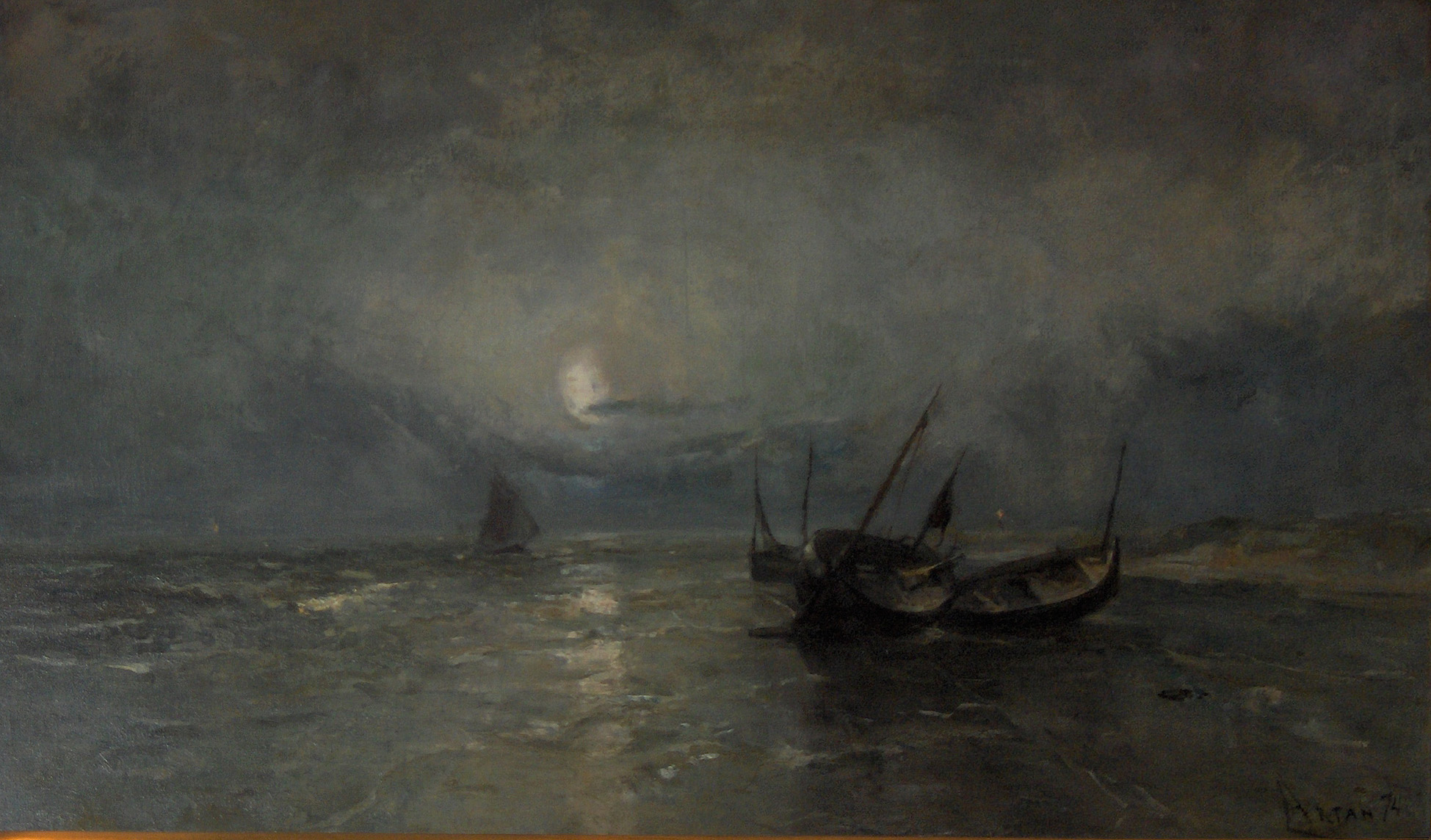
Stranded boats at night

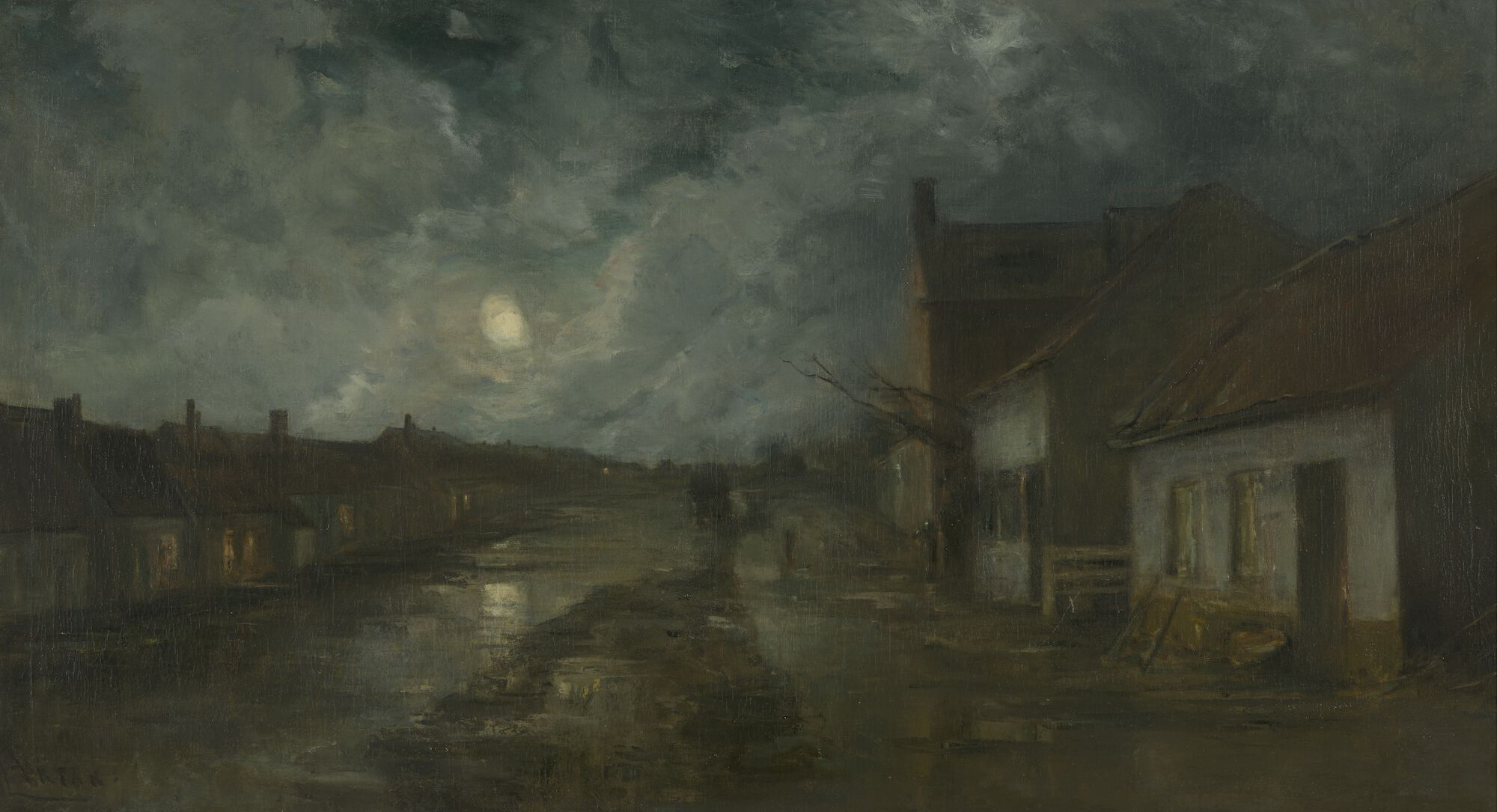
Night view street Navigo National Fisheries Museum

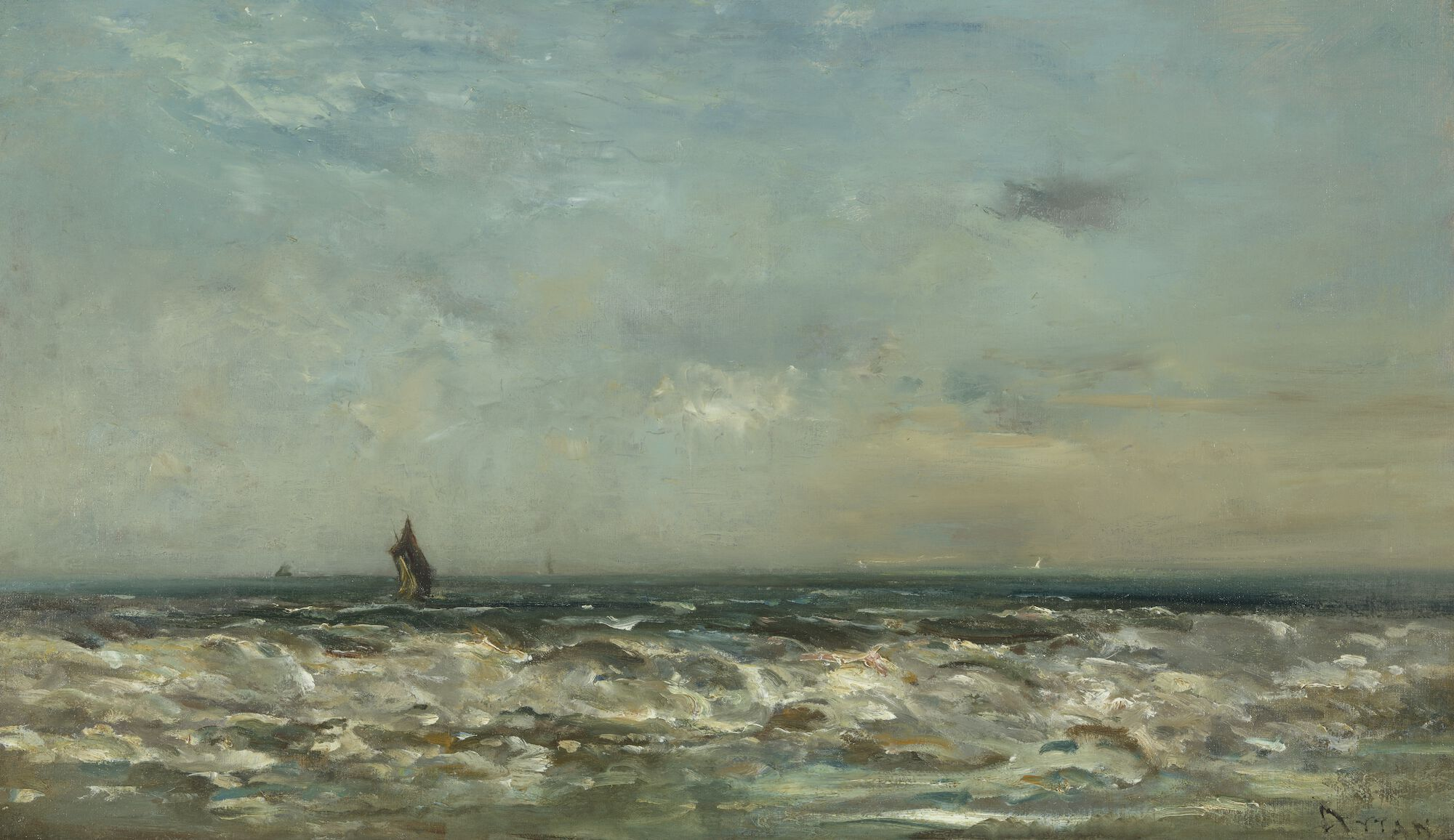
Marine Navigo National Fisheries Museum

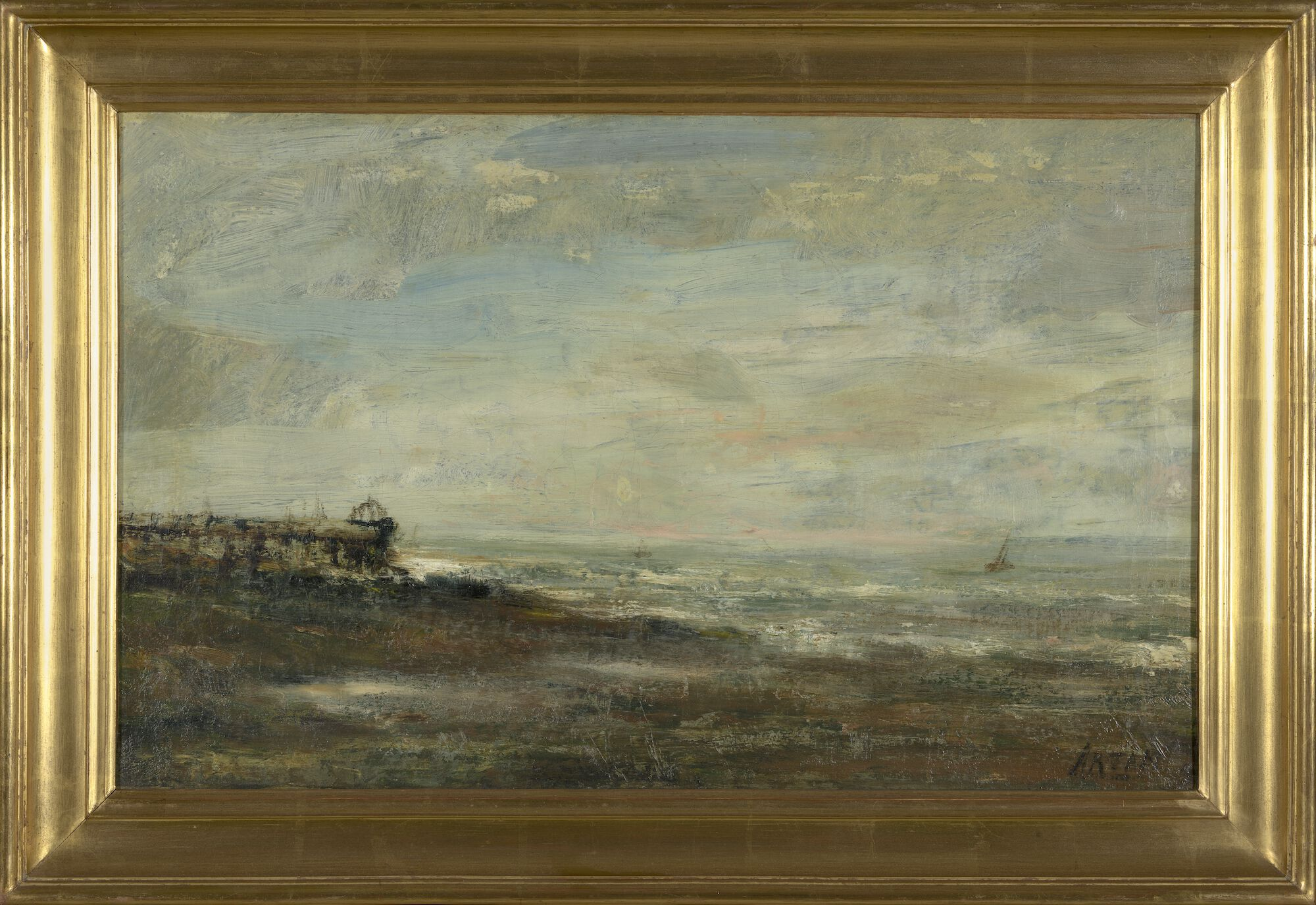
Harbour head NAVIGO National Fisheries Museum

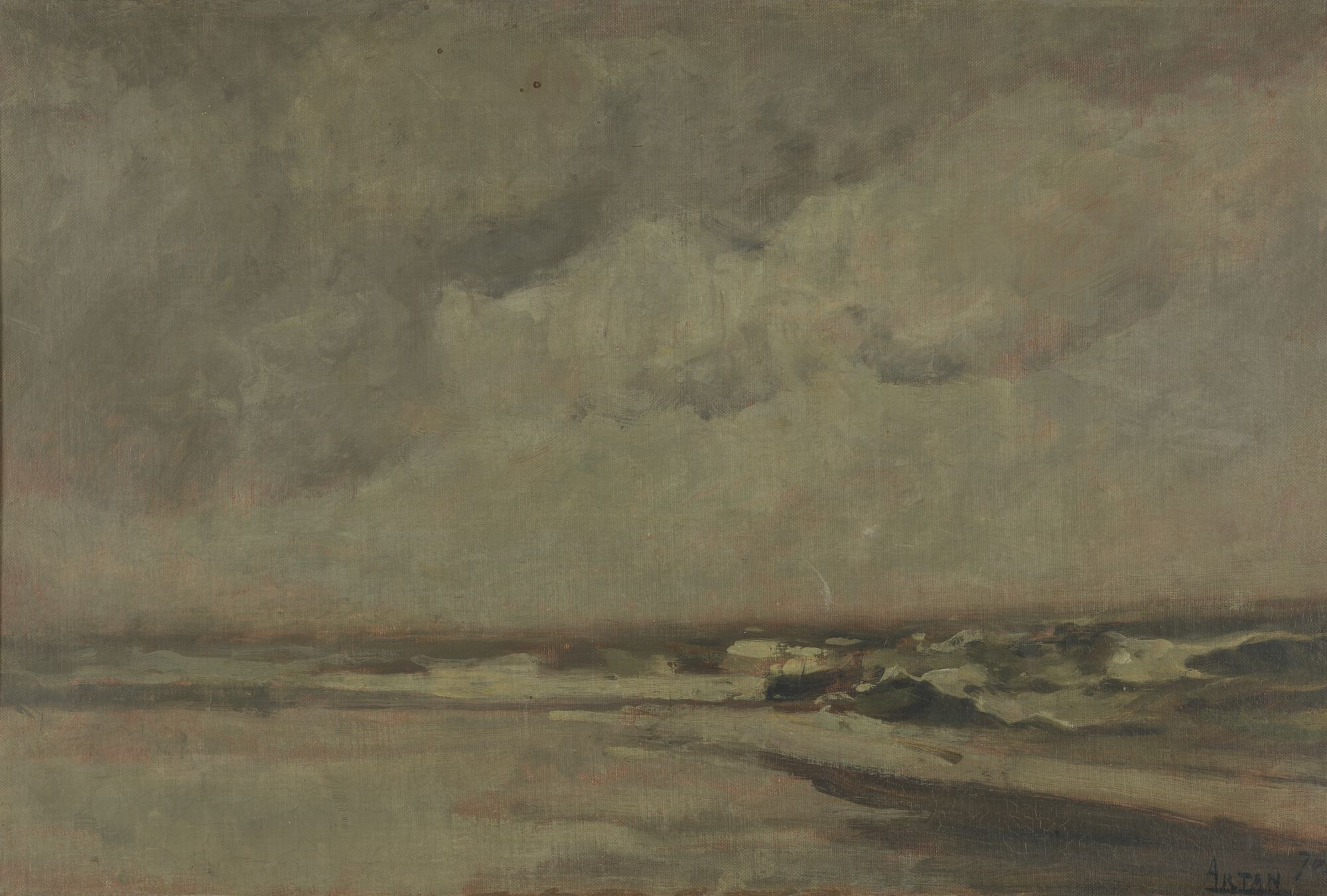
Branding NAVIGO National Fisheries Museum

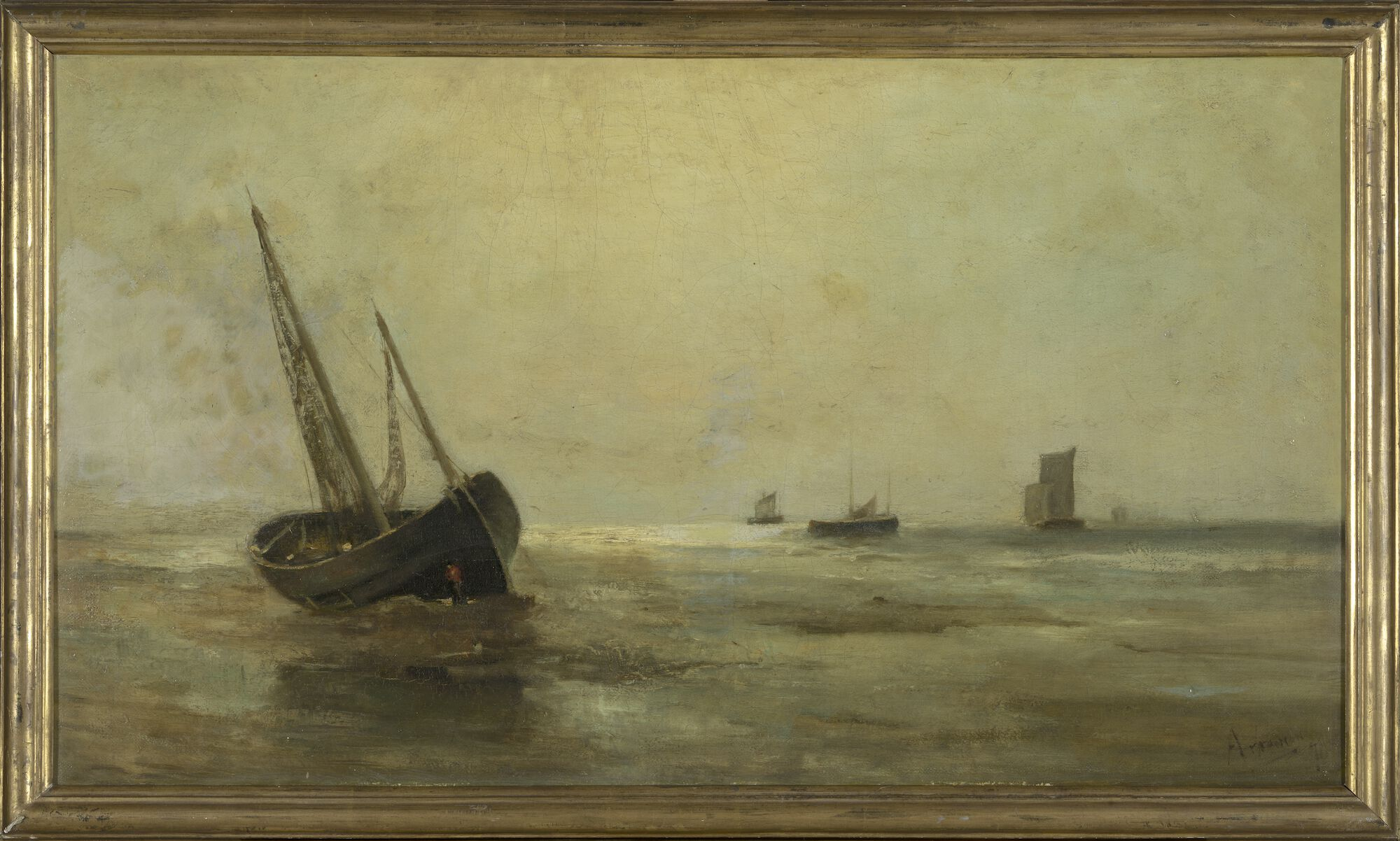
Barge on the beach NAVIGO National Fisheries Museum
