= L'Essor (artist group) =

L'Essor ([le.sɔʁ], French) was an association of visual artists in Brussels, active from 1876 to 1891. Its original aim was to rebel against the conservative tendencies of the art institutions and circles in Brussels.

== History ==
L'Essor came into existence under the name "Cercle des Elèves et Anciens Elèves des Académies des Beaux-Arts de Bruxelles" ("Circle of alumni and students of the Academies of Fine Arts in Brussels") in 1876. Only in November 1879 was the association's name changed to 'L'Essor', a French word meaning 'rising' or 'booming'. The name thus ceased its reference to the academic institutions in Brussels.

Its motto was "a unique art, one life", indicating its focus on the unity between Art and Life.

The founders were seen as progressives who wished to rebel against bourgeois and conservative literary and artistic circles of Brussels. In reality l'Essor had no real program and would eventually encompass artists from the avant-garde and the more conservative circles.

== Members of L'Essor ==
Louis Cambier, Léon Herbo, Henri Permeke (father of Constant Permeke), Louis Pion and Franz Seghers, are among the founders of L'Essor. When changing the name to l'Essor, Emile Hoeterickx, Julien Dillens, Amédée Lynen and Auguste-Ernest Sembach joined the group.

Gradually, other artists joined l'Essor including Fernand Khnopff (a first time participant in a l'Essor exhibition in 1881), Frantz Charlet, James Ensor, Darío de Regoyos, Albert Baertsoen, Frans Van Leemputten, John Mayne, Théo van Rysselberghe, Willy Schlobach, Guillaume Vogels, Léon Frédéric, François-Joseph Halkett, Peter George, Adolphe Hamesse, Alexandre Hannotiau, Léon Houyoux, Antoine Lacroix, Charles Goethals, Marie de Bièvre, Ernest de Bièvre, Jan Toorop and Agapit Stevens.

== Split and creation of the group Les XX and For Art ==
In 1883, a few artists left the movement after a disagreement in order to create a new artistic group Les XX. This dissatisfaction has come primarily from the fact that l'Essor had no real program and welcomed both realistic and traditional artists than avant-garde.

l'Essor was officially dissolved in 1891.

The association of artists Pour l'Art, also emerged in 1892.
