= Portrait of Marguerite van Mons =

Oil on canvas painting by Belgian painter Théo van Rysselberghe

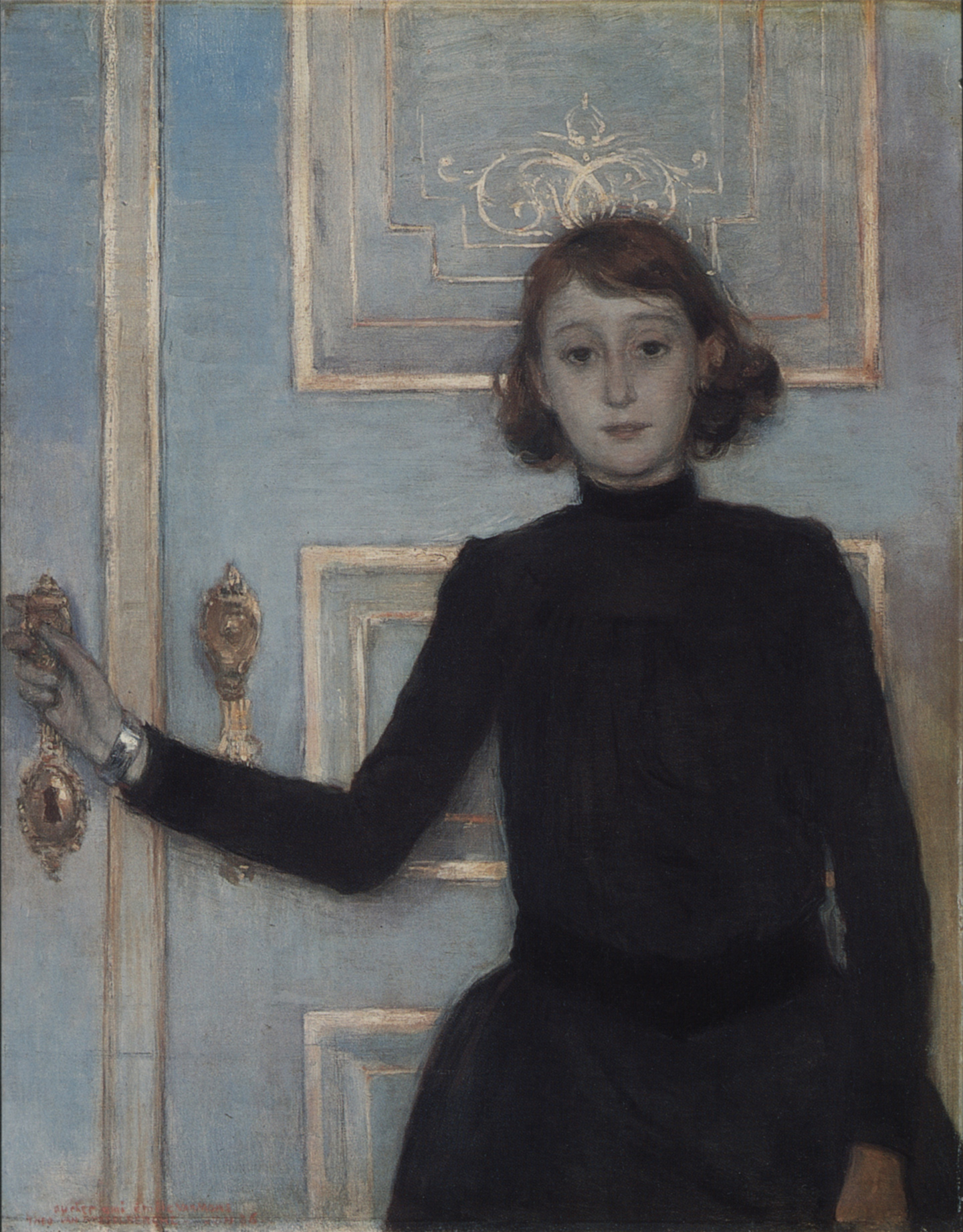
- Artist: Théo van Rysselberghe
- Year: 1886
- Catalogue: 1979-C
- Medium: Oil on canvas
- Dimensions: 89.5 cm × 70.5 cm (35.2 in × 27.7 in)
- Location: Museum of Fine Arts; Ghent

Portrait of Marguerite van Mons is an oil-on-canvas painting by Belgian painter Théo van Rysselberghe. The girl portrayed is ten-year-old Marguerite van Mons, depicted shortly after the death of her mother. Théo van Rysselberghe was friends with Emile van Mons, a lawyer and well-known art lover, and painted his daughter Marguerite in June 1886. He had previously painted a portrait of her sister Camille (Portrait of Camille Van Mons, 1886) which is now part of the collection of the Niedersächsisches Landesmuseum in Hanover.

The portrait shows Marguerite in a simple black dress in front of a pastel blue door with a number of gilded ornaments on it. The painting derives its strength from the mysterious, dreamy look in the girl's eyes and the masterfully elaborated background that fully serves the model. Van Rysselberghe's portraits from this period are often compared to Whistler's works, but Velázquez, admired by both Van Rysselberghe and Whistler, was also a source of inspiration. The painting is currently housed at the Museum of Fine Arts in Ghent.

== Painting ==
Marguerite van Mons stares at the viewer with a dreamy and absent look. Van Rysselberghe portrayed the girl shortly after the death of her mother. The gloom of the dress is in stark contrast to her pale mien and the soft blue hue of the door with gilded contours.

The girl is depicted head-on with her back to the door. Her right hand holds the doorknob as if she had just entered or were about to leave the room. It is this ambiguous gesture and the general melancholic atmosphere that give this seemingly realistic portrait a symbolistic character.

The influence of James Abbott McNeill Whistler's portraiture is clearly palpable. Van Rysselberghe became acquainted with his work at the salons of Les Vingt. The painter dedicated the portrait to his friend Emile van Mons, Marguerite's father.

== Sources ==
- "Portrait of Marguerite Van Mons". Flemish Art Collection.
