= Le canal en Flandre par temps triste =

1894 painting by Théo van Rysselberghe

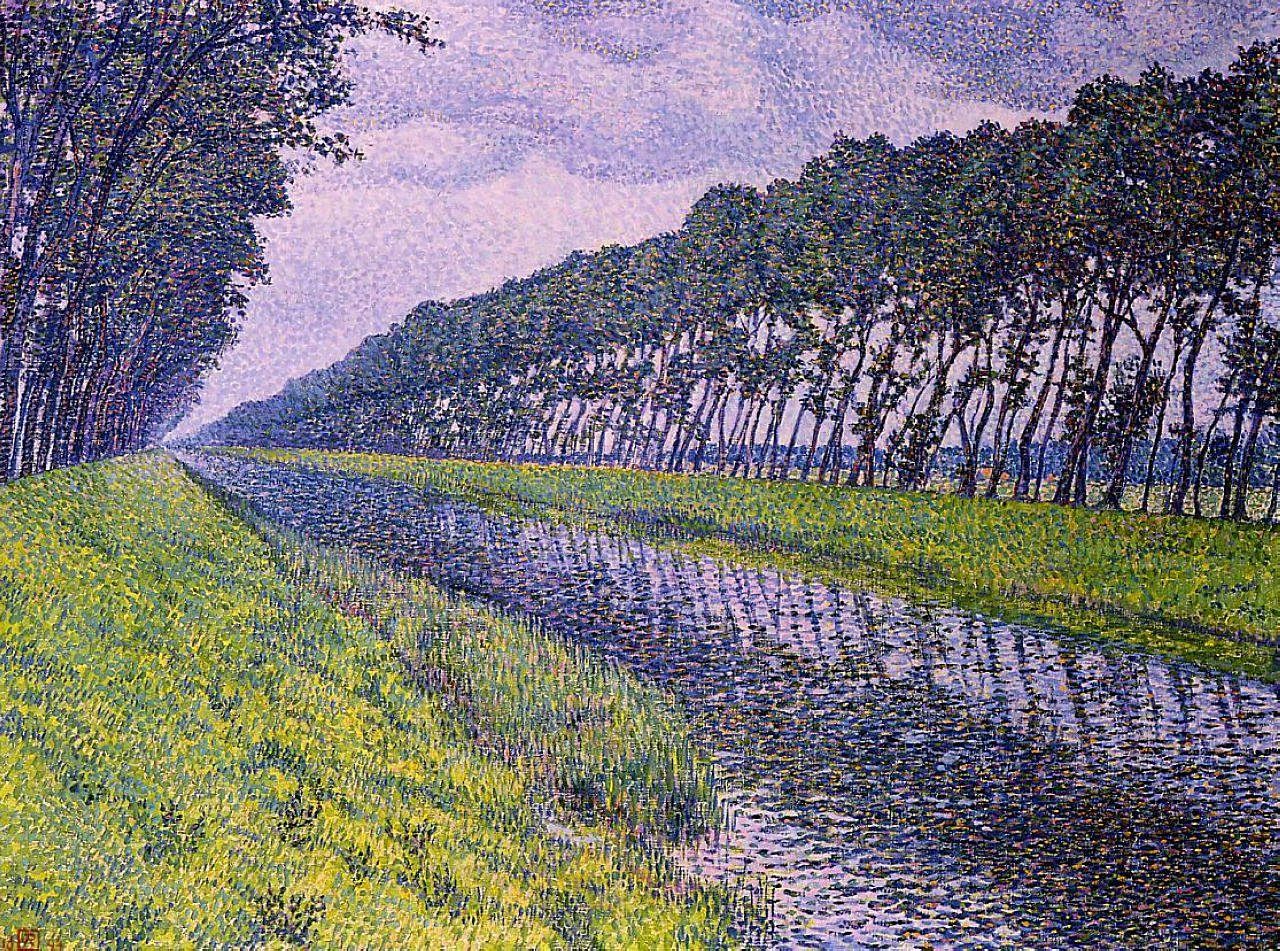
- Artist: Théo van Rysselberghe
- Year: 1894
- Medium: Oil on canvas
- Dimensions: 60 cm × 80 cm (23¾ in × 31½ in)
- Location: Private collection, Unknown

Le canal en Flandre par temps triste is an oil on canvas painting by Belgian painter Théo van Rysselberghe, created in 1894.

It was sold in June 2011 to an unknown buyer for nearly four million dollars.

== Painting ==
The painting features two lines of trees by a Flemish canal. The channel in the painting has been associated with the extant canal running between Bruges and Damme. The trees in the lefthand line are receding rhythmically to the background (the movement of the trees in the righthand line is barely perceivable). The receding trees are tilted in the direction opposite to where the perspective plunges.

As in most of his pointillist oeuvre, Van Rysselberghe here combined the dappling colors applied in small dots of pointillism to (short) brushstrokes, which he used to paint the grass. Van Rysselberghe's attention to details is evident here, and his mastery in pointillism and choice of color makes this painting's surface vibrate and sparkle.

The painting was sold to an unknown buyer on June 31, 2011 at Christie's in London, for GBP 2,617,250 (about $3,916,000 in 2020).

== Sources ==
- "Théo van Rysselberghe Le canal en Flandre par temps triste". Christie's.
- L'Art Moderne, 13 March 1893.
- O. Maus, letter of 13 March 1898.
- M.J. Chartrain-Hebbelinck, 'Les lettres de Théo van Rysselberghe à O. Maus' in Bulletin des Musées Royaux des Beaux-Arts, vol. XV, 1966, no. 1–2, pp. 55–130.
