= Agapit Stevens =

Belgian painter (1848–1924)

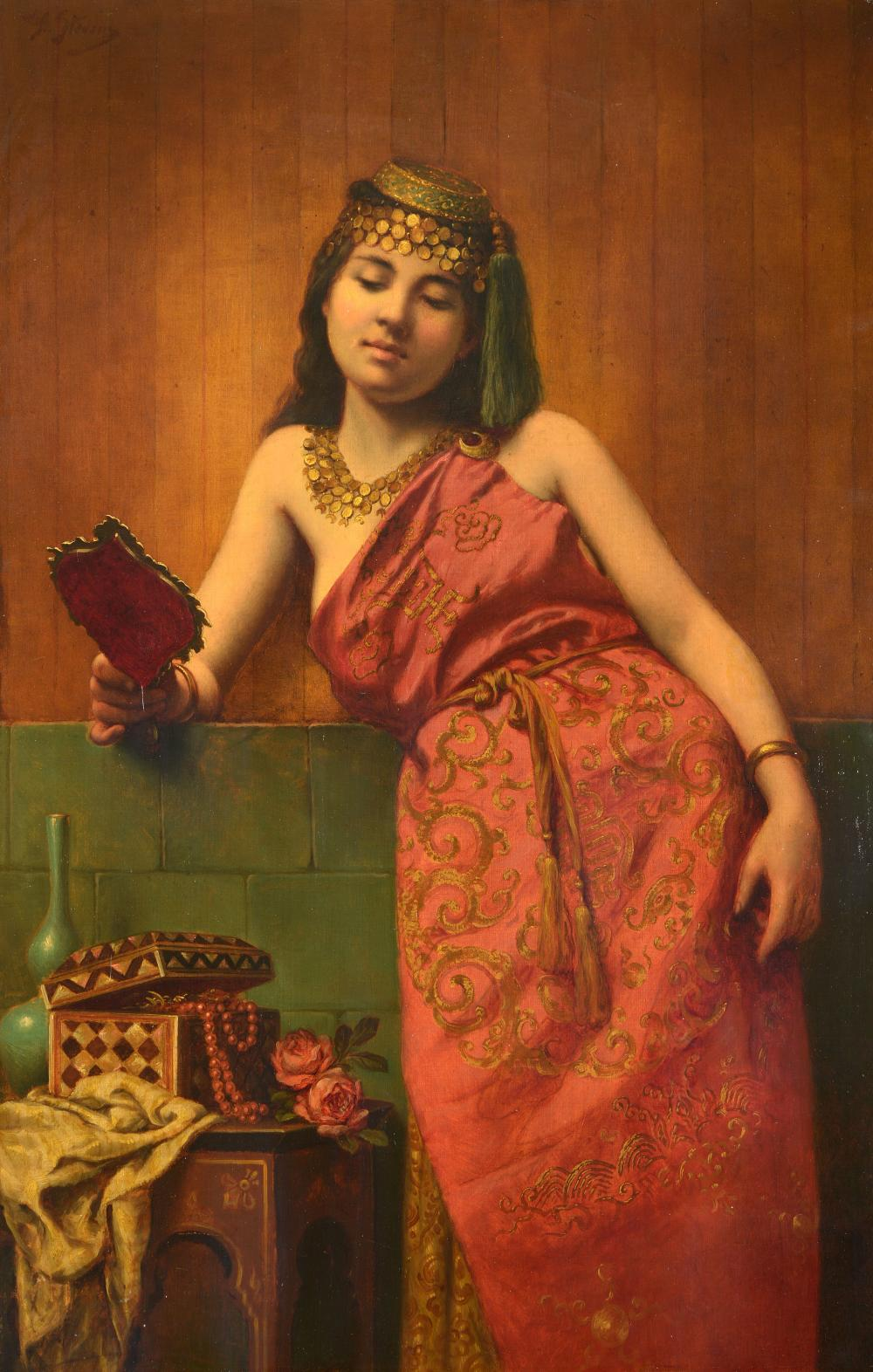
The Egyptian

Agapit Pierre Jean Joseph Stevens (née Agapit Pierre Jean Joseph Van Gotsenhoven; 21 October 1848 – 19 February 1924) was a Belgian painter of glamorous women in interiors, genre scenes, landscapes, seascapes, still lifes and Orientalist scenes depicting odalisques, dancers and harem musicians.

== Life ==
Agapit Stevens was born on 21 October 1848 in Brussels and was registered under the name Agapit Pierre Jean Joseph Van Gotsenhoven. As his parents Jean Daniel Stevens and Marie Van Gotsenhoven were unmarried at the time of his birth he was registered under his mother's name. His parents were married on 24 August 1853 in Brussels. On this occasion his birth was legalised and he was from then on named Stevens. His father was a painter of genre scenes. His brother (Alphonse Jacques) René Stevens was born on 25 April 1858 in Ixelles and also became a painter.

On 11 March 1875, he married Marie Mélanie Desmares in Elsene. The couple had at least two children. His wife died on 13 February 1898 in Etterbeek. He married Joséphine Loriaux as his second wife on 16 December 1899 in Elsene.

He was a member of L'Essor, an artists' association in Brussels founded on 4 March 1876 by students of the Royal Academy of Fine Arts of Brussels. The association held many exhibitions of its members and other artists in Brussels and elsewhere in Belgium.

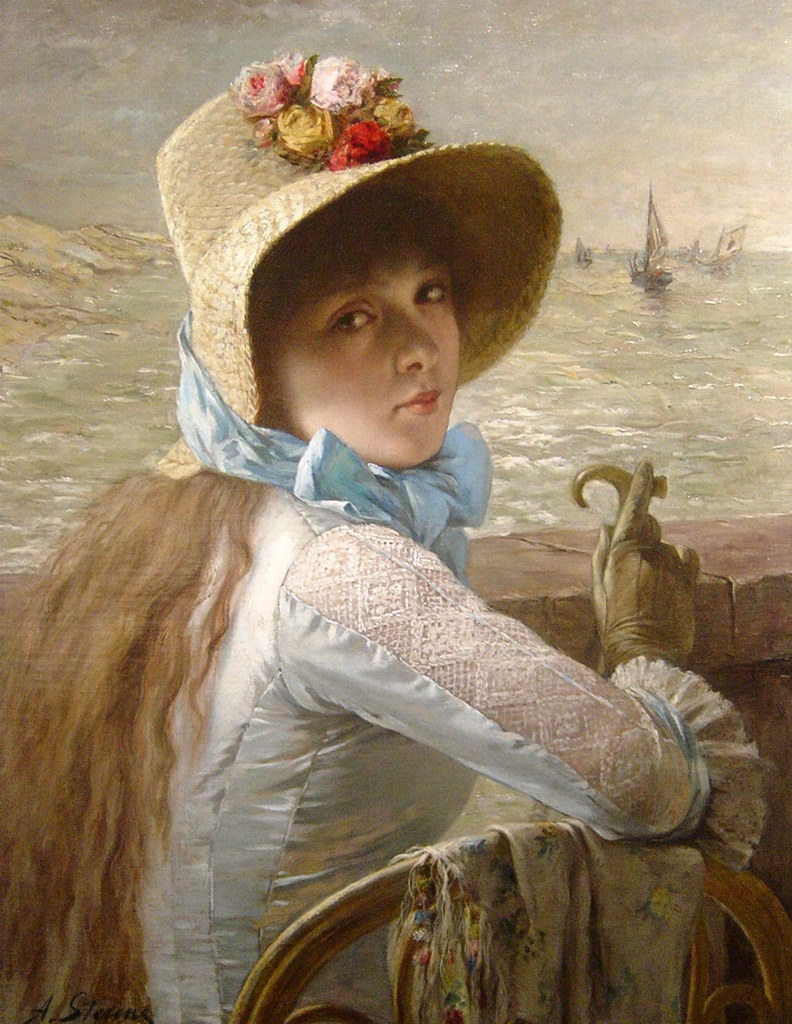
Young Girl at the Seaside

He died in Watermael-Boitsfort, Brussels on 19 February 1924.

== Work ==
Agapit Stevens painted glamorous women in interiors, genre scenes, landscapes, seascapes, still lifes and Orientalist scenes depicting odalisques, dancers and harem musicians. His Orientalist paintings appear to be studio works rather than the product of a visit to the Orient.

He was much less well known than his namesake the Belgian painter Alfred Stevens (1823-1906), who was a successful portrait and genre painter working primarily in Paris during the Belle Époque. As Agapit Stevens signed his works with "A. Stevens" and the two artists shared a Realist style and the same subject matter of glamorous women, the works of the artists are sometimes wrongly attributed. The confusion between the two artist was such that the Orde van de Nederlandschen Leeuw (Order of the Netherlands Lion) awarded by the Dutch king to Alfred Stevens in 1884 was erroneously sent to Agapit. The latter seems to have been reluctant to send the award back and the Belgian government threatened to sue Agapit in the matter.

== Gallery ==
Selected works

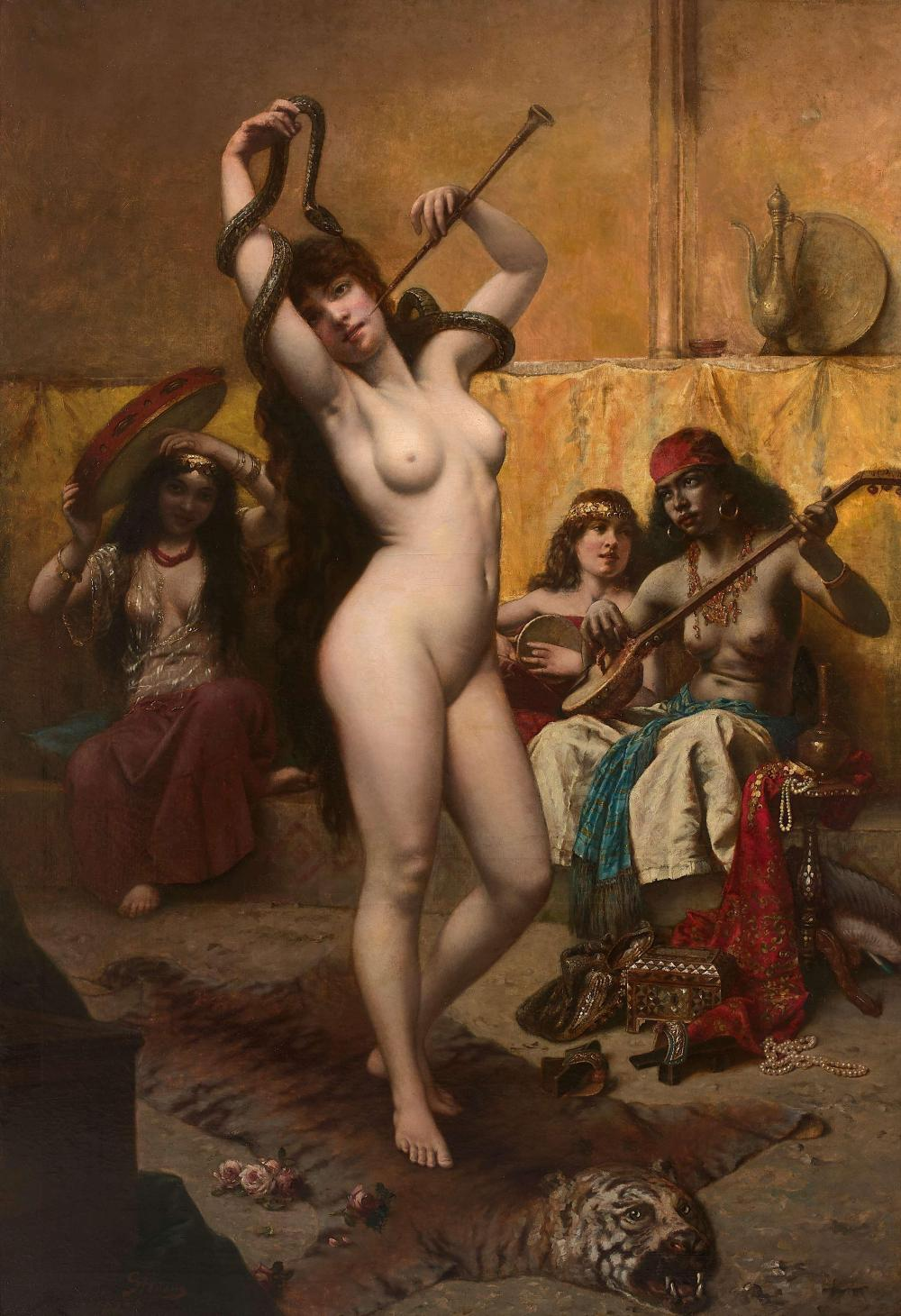
The snake dance

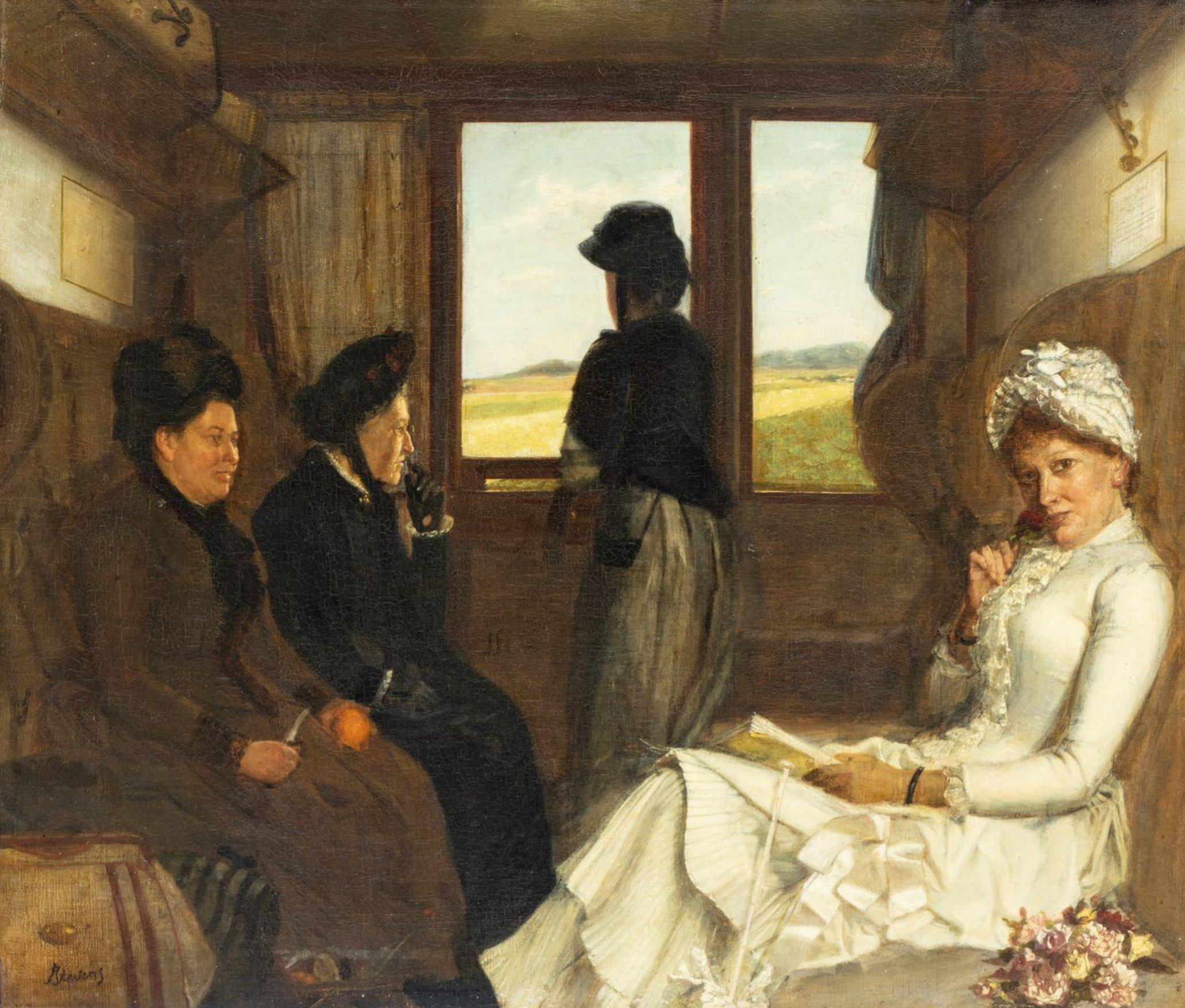
On the train to Paris

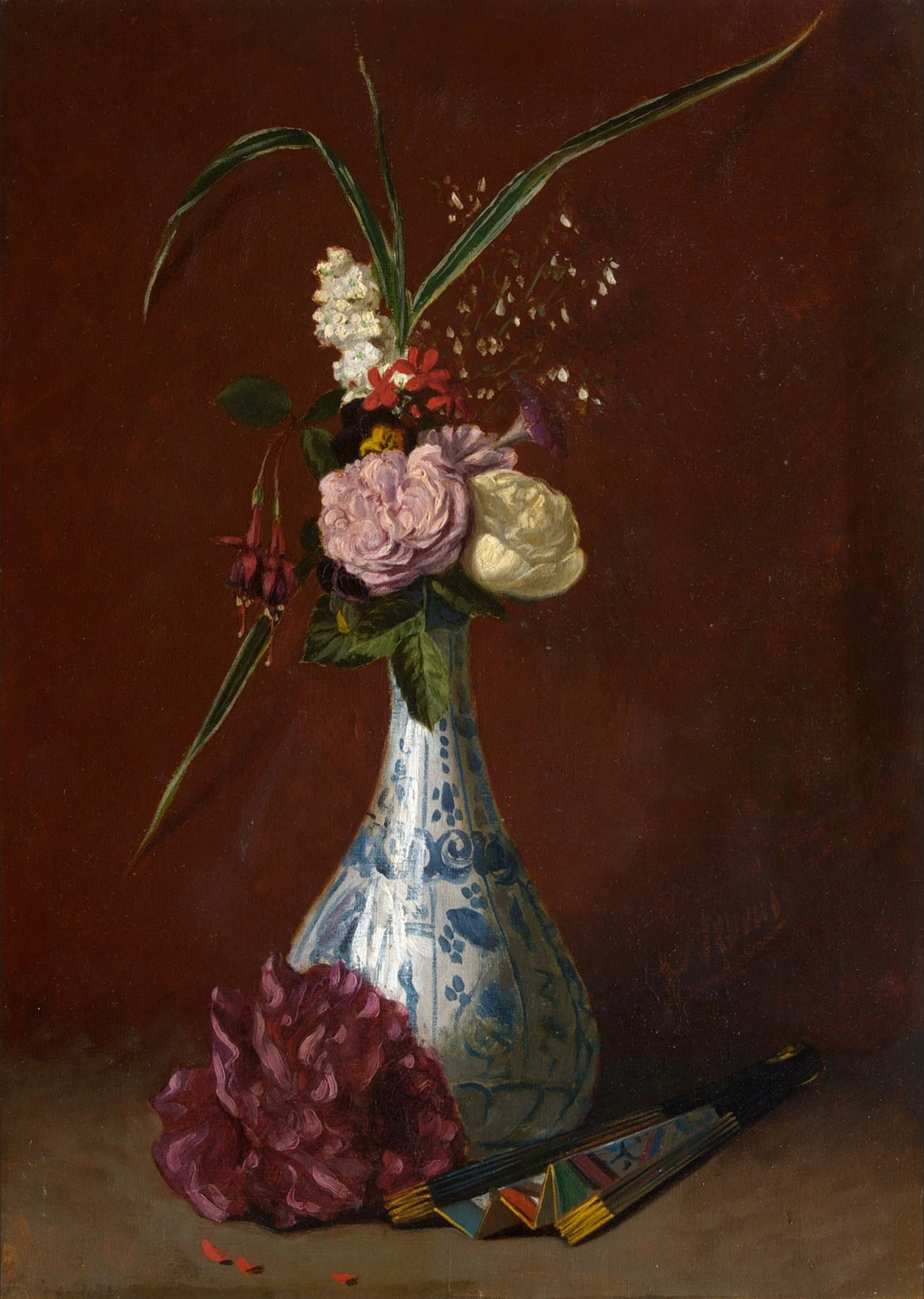
Still life with a fan

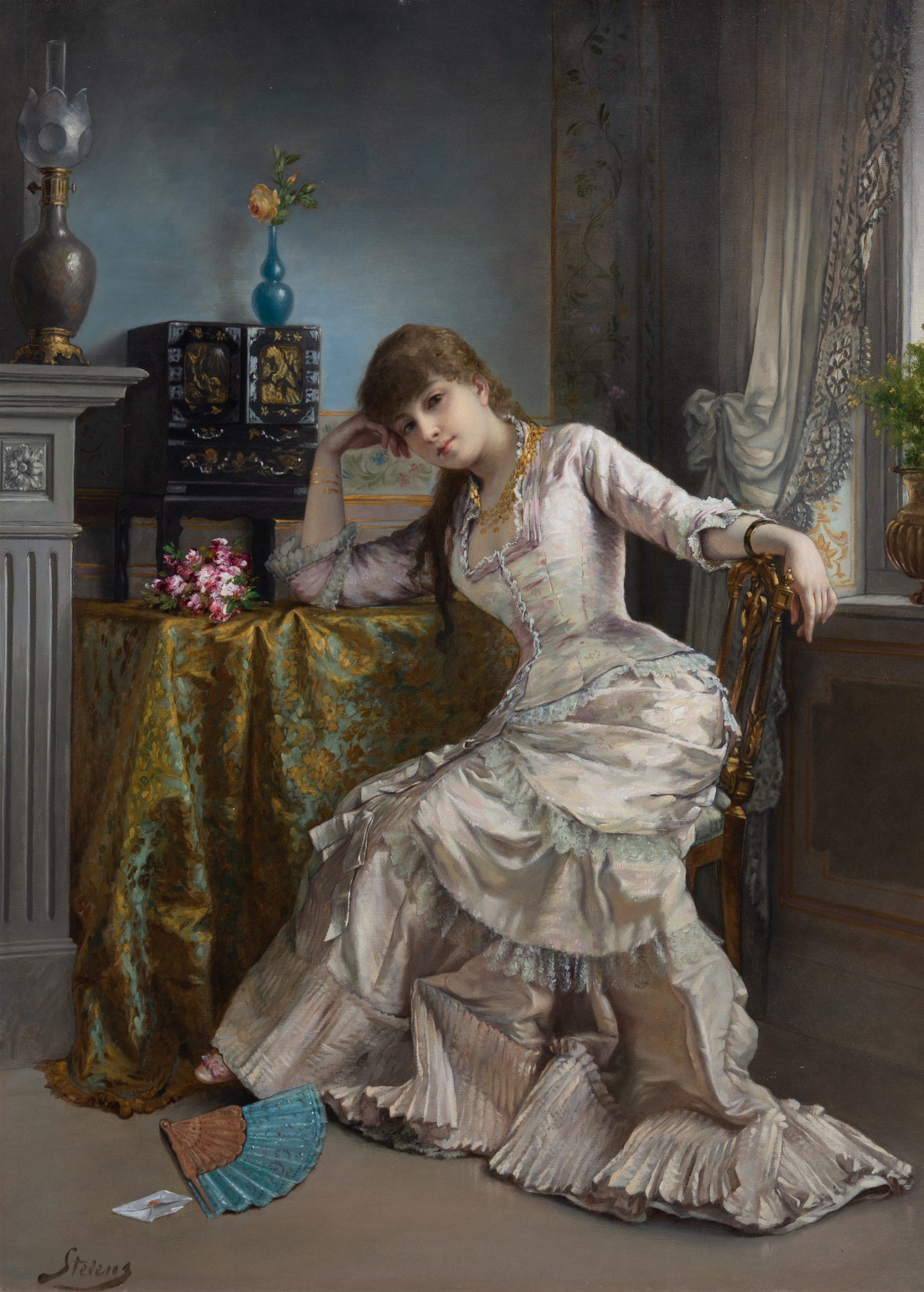
The bouquet
