= Théo van Rysselberghe =

Belgian painter (1862–1926)

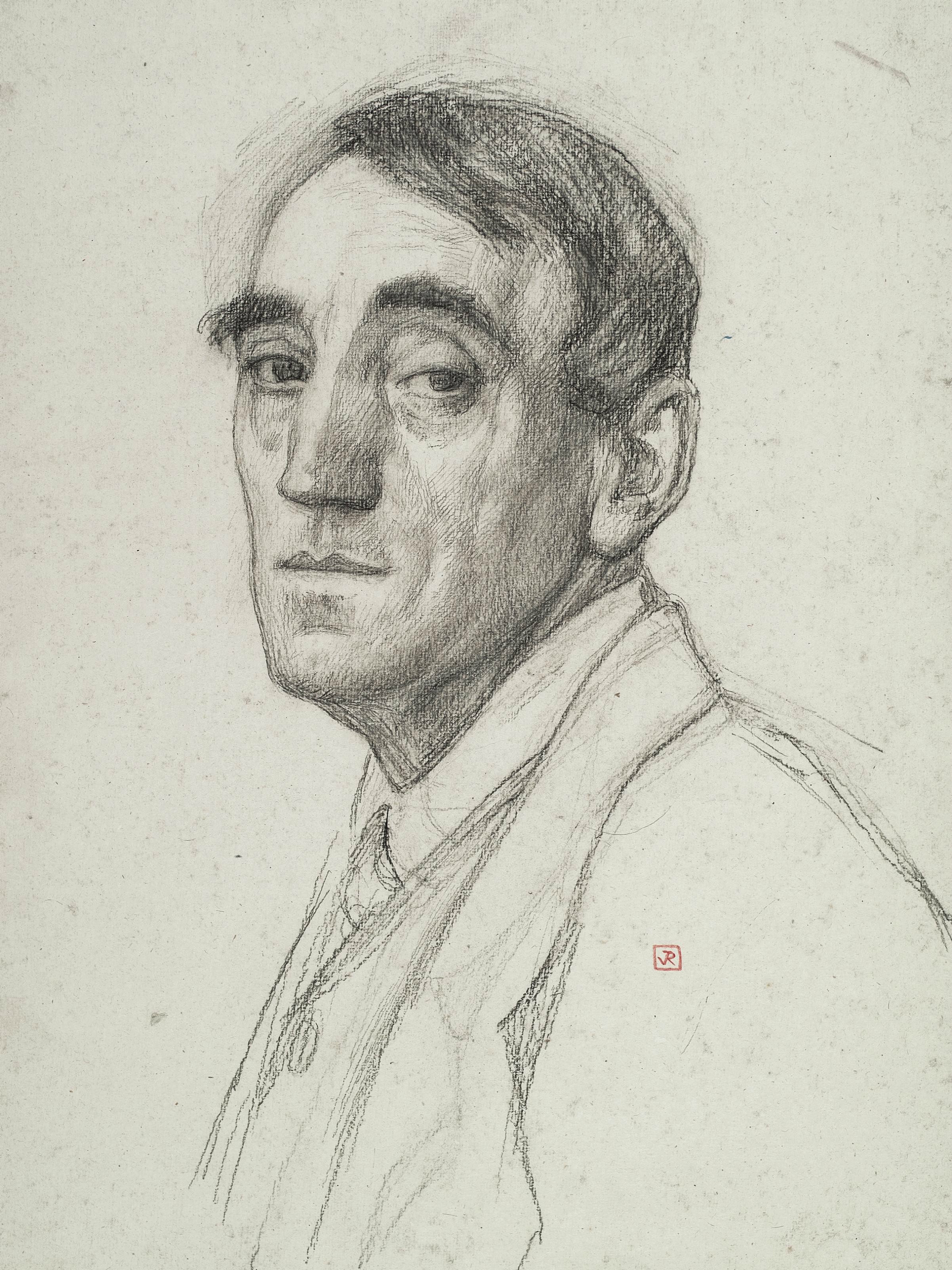
- Self-portrait, 1916
- Born: 23 November 1862; Ghent, Belgium
- Died: 13 December 1926 (aged 64); Saint-Clair, Var, France
- Known for: Painting
- Movement: Neo-impressionism
- Spouse: Marie Monnom (m. 1889)
- Children: Élisabeth van Rysselberghe
- Relatives: Octave van Rysselberghe (brother); Catherine Gide (granddaughter)

Théophile "Théo" van Rysselberghe (/vænˈrɪsəlbɜːrɡə/; French: [teofil teɔ vɑ̃ ʁisɛlbɛʁɡ]; 23 November 1862 – 13 December 1926) was a Belgian Neo-Impressionist painter who played a pivotal role in the European art scene at the turn of the twentieth century. A founding member of the Belgian avant-garde group Les XX, he was an important figure in the international Neo-Impressionist movement and helped connect the artistic circles of Brussels and Paris with wider European cultural networks. His work was distinguished by its innovative treatment of colour and light, particularly in his portraits and landscapes.

Born in Ghent and trained at the Academy of Ghent and the Académie Royale des Beaux-Arts in Brussels, van Rysselberghe initially worked in a realist and Orientalist style. His extensive travels in Spain and Morocco during the 1880s strongly influenced his interest in light and colour. After encountering Impressionism and, in 1886, Georges Seurat's A Sunday Afternoon on the Island of La Grande Jatte, he adopted Neo-Impressionism and became one of its leading practitioners outside France.

Through Les XX and later La Libre Esthétique, van Rysselberghe played an important role in the international circulation of avant-garde art, helping bring the work of Seurat, Paul Signac and other French artists to Belgian and wider European audiences. His extensive artistic and literary connections included artists and writers such as Signac, James Ensor, Émile Verhaeren, Henry van de Velde and André Gide. Van Rysselberghe developed a distinctive and highly personal form of Pointillism, adapting the systematic principles of French Neo-Impressionism to his own expressive use of colour and light. His luminous portraits and landscapes transformed the technique into a distinctive decorative and expressive style, giving his work a character distinct from that of Seurat and other French Neo-Impressionists.

From around 1900, van Rysselberghe gradually moved away from strict Pointillism, replacing its regular dots with broader and more fluid strokes while retaining his characteristic concern with colour and light. His later work extended beyond Neo-Impressionism into landscapes, seascapes, monumental nudes and decorative compositions, particularly after his move to the south of France.

== Biography ==
=== Early years ===
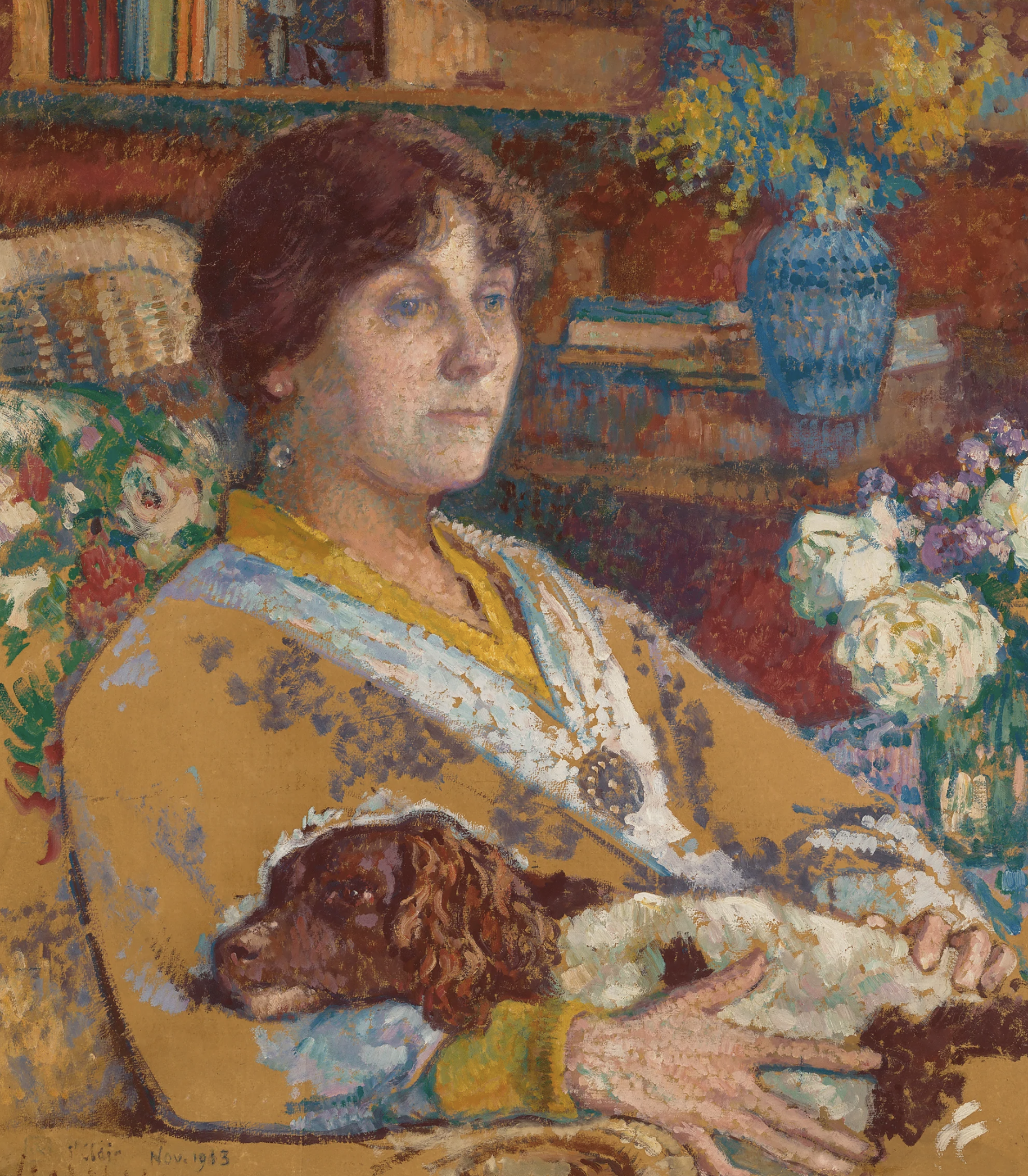
Théo van Rysselberghe, Portrait of Laure Flé, 1913. Oil on board mounted on panel.

Born in Ghent to a French-speaking bourgeois family, he studied first at the Academy of Ghent under Theo Canneel and from 1879 at the Académie Royale des Beaux-Arts in Brussels under the directorship of Jean-François Portaels. The North African paintings of Portaels had started an orientalist fashion in Belgium. Their impact would strongly influence the young Théo van Rysselberghe. Between 1882 and 1888, he made three trips to Morocco, staying there in total a year and a half.

Age only eighteen, he had already participated at the Salon of Ghent, showing two portraits. Soon afterwards followed his Self-portrait with pipe (1880), painted in somber colours in the Belgian realistic tradition of the times. His Child in an open spot of the forest (1880) departs from this style and he makes his first steps towards impressionism. Soon he would develop his own realistic style, akin to impressionism. In 1881, he exhibited for the first time at the Salon in Brussels.

=== First trip to Morocco ===
The next year he travelled (following in the footsteps of Jean-François Portaels) extensively in Spain and Morocco together with his friend Frantz Charlet and the Asturian painter Darío de Regoyos. He especially admired the 'old masters' in the Museo del Prado. In Seville they met Constantin Meunier, who was copying Pedro Campaña's Descent from the Cross. From this Spanish trip stem the following portraits : Spanish woman (1881) and Sevillan woman (1882), already completely different in style. When he set foot in Tanger at the end of October 1882, a whole new world opened up for him: so close to Europe and yet completely different. He would stay there for four months, drawing and painting the picturesque scenes on the street, the kasbah and in the souk: Arabian street cobbler (1882), Arabian boy (1882), Resting guard (1883)

Back in Belgium, he showed about 30 works of his trip at the "Cercle Artistique et Littéraire" in Ghent. It was an instant success, especially The kief smokers, The orange seller and a seascape The strait (setting sun), Tanger (1882).

In April 1883 he exhibited these scenes of everyday Mediterranean life at the salon L'Essor, in Brussels, before an enthusiast public. It was also around this time that he befriended the writer and poet Emile Verhaeren, whom he would later portray several times.

In September 1883 van Rysselberghe went to Haarlem to study the light in the works of Frans Hals. The accurate rendering of light would continue to occupy his mind. There he also met the American painter William Merritt Chase.

=== Les XX ===
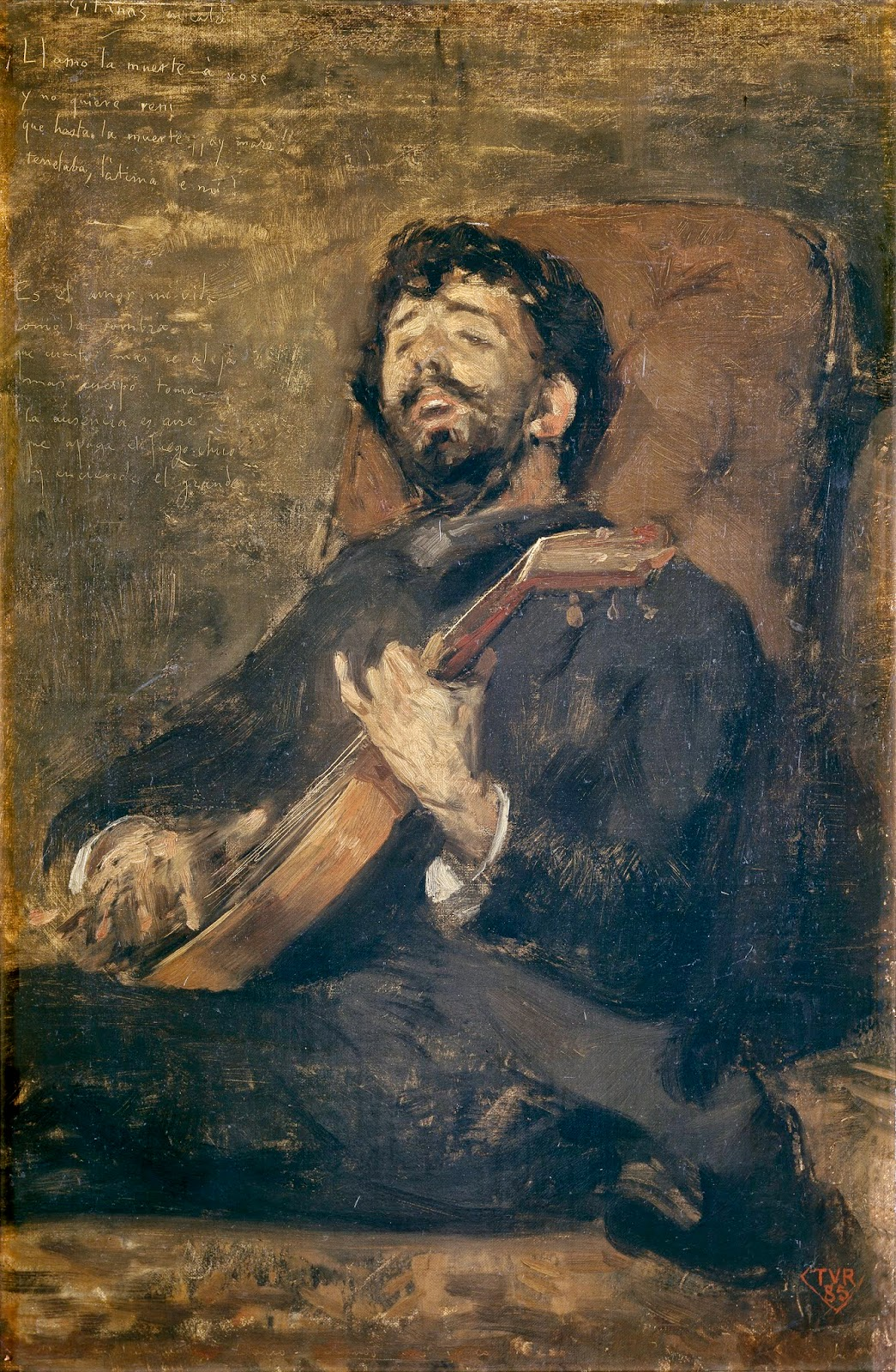
Dario de Regoyos playing the Guitar (1885), Prado Museum

Théo van Rysselberghe was one of the prominent co-founders of the Belgian artistic circle Les XX on 28 October 1883. This was a circle of young radical artists, under the patronage, as secretary, of the Brussels jurist and art lover Octave Maus (1856–1919). They rebelled against the outmoded academism of the time and the prevailing artistic standards. Among the most notable members were James Ensor, Willy Finch, Fernand Khnopff, Félicien Rops, and later Auguste Rodin and Paul Signac. This membership brought van Rysselberghe in contact with other radical artists, such as James Abbott McNeill Whistler, who had exhibited in Les XX in 1884. His influence as a portrait painter can be seen in van Rysselberghe's portrait of Octave Maus as a dandy (1885). Van Rysselberghe would paint several portraits of Octave Maus and his wife between 1883 and 1890.

=== Second trip to Morocco ===
In November 1883 he left again for Tanger, together with Frantz Charlet, for Tanger. During his stay of one year, he was in constant correspondence with Octave Maus, urging him to accept several new names for the first exhibition of "Les XX": Constantin Meunier, Alfred Verwee, and William Merritt Chase, whom he had met in 1883 in Haarlem.) In April 1884 he visited Andalucia in the company of the American painter John Singer Sargent and the gentleman-painter Ralph Curtis. He also invited them to the exhibition in Brussels. This time, van Rysselberghe tried to surpass himself. His large, exotic painting Arabian phantasia, a theme introduced by Eugène Delacroix, is his best known work from this period. It is bathed in the harsh light of the hot Moroccan sun. From then on van Rysselberghe would be obsessed by light. But lack of funds forced him to return to Belgium at the end of October 1884.

At the second show of Les XX in 1885 Théo van Rysselberghe showed his Arabian phantasia and other images and paintings from his second Moroccan trip, such as Abraham Sicsu (interpreter in Tanger) (1884).

=== Impressionism ===
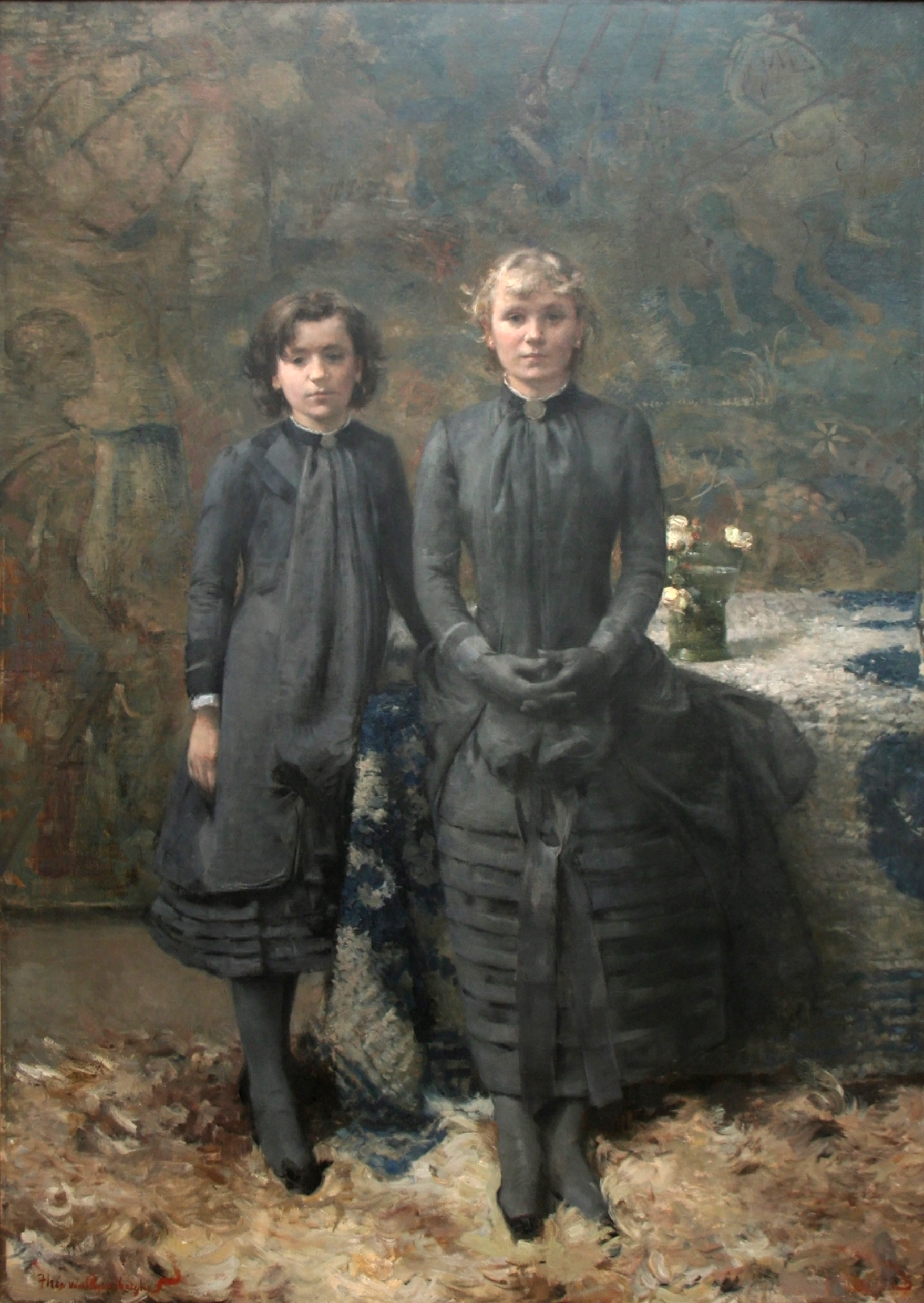
Jeanne and Marguerite Schlobach

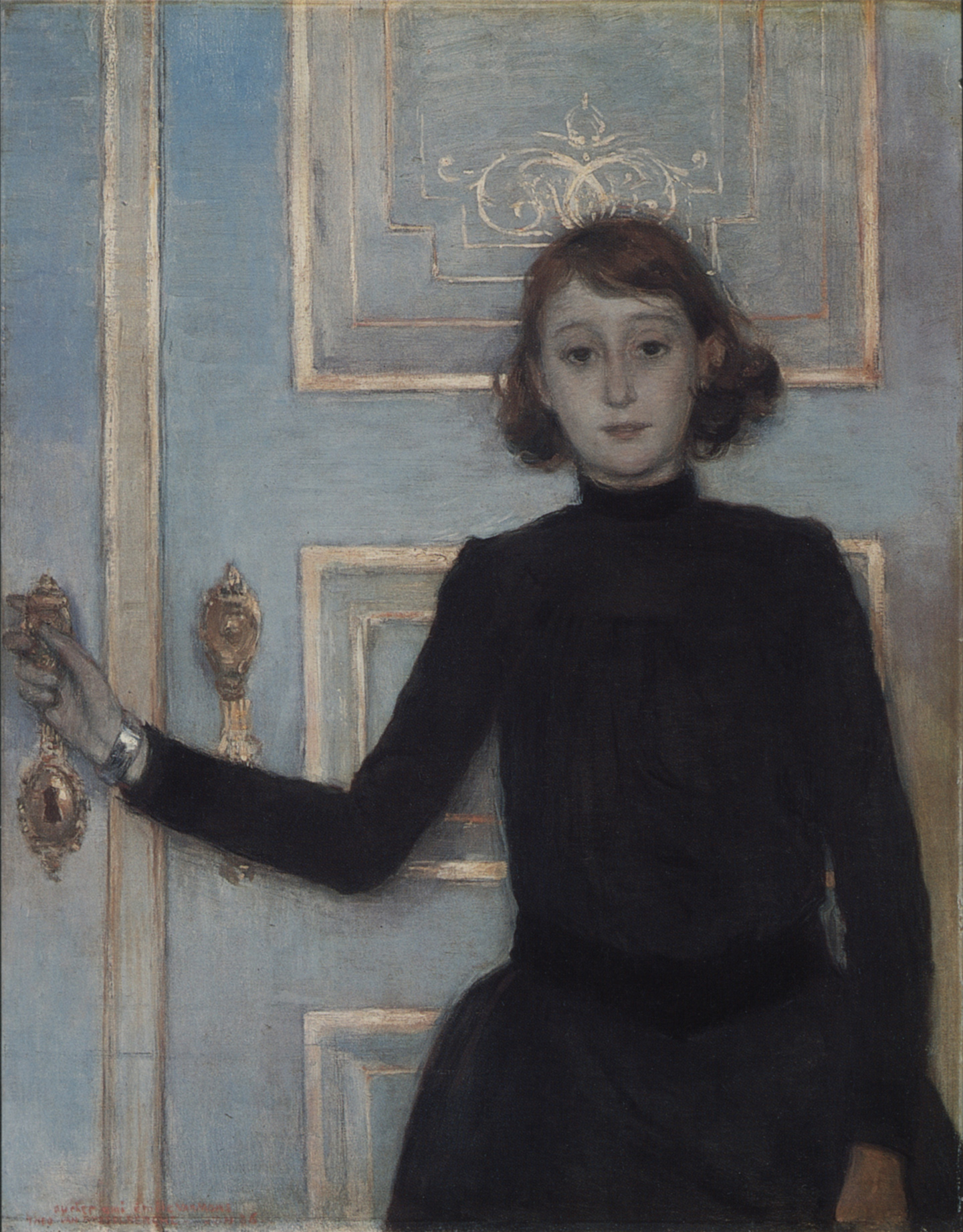
Portrait of Marguerite van Mons

Yet his next portraits are in rather subdued colours, using different black or purple gradations contrasting with light colours: Jeanne and Marguerite Schlobach (1884), Octave Maus (1885), Camille Van Mons (1886), Marguerite Van Mons (1886) (to be compared with Portrait of Gabrielle Braun (1886) by Fernand Khnopff).

He saw the works of the impressionists Monet and Auguste Renoir at the show of Les XX in 1886. He was deeply impressed. He experimented with this technique, as can be seen in Woman with Japanese album (1886). This impressionist influence became prominent in his paintings Madame Picard in her Loge (1886) and Madame Oscar Ghysbrecht (1886) (painted in a palette of bright colours). In 1887 he painted some impressionist seascapes at the Belgian coast, including Het Zwin at high tide (1887).

Rysselberghe influenced the work of his friend Omer Coppens from realism toward indigenous impressionism and painted at least one portrait of him in oils.

Because of his growing ties with the Parisian art scene, Octave Maus sent Rysselberghe as a talent scout to Paris to look out for new talent for the next exhibitions of Les XX.

=== Neo-impressionism ===
He discovered the pointillist technique when he saw Georges Seurat's La Grande Jatte at the eighth impressionist exhibition in Paris in 1886. Together with Henry Van de Velde, Georges Lemmen, Xavier Mellery, Willy Schlobach, Alfred William Finch, and Anna Boch, he "imported" this style to Belgium. Seurat was invited to the next salon of Les XX in Brussels in 1887. But there his La Grande Jatte was heavily criticized by the art critics as "incomprehensible gibberish applied to the noble art of painting".

Théo van Rysselberghe abandoned realism and became an adept of pointillism. This brought him sometimes in heavy conflict with James Ensor. In 1887 van Rysselberghe already experimented with this style, as can be seen in his Madame Oscar Ghysbrecht (1887) and Madame Edmond Picard (1887). While staying in summer 1887 a few weeks with Eugène Boch (brother of Anna Boch) in Batignolles, near Paris, he met several painters from the Parisian scene such as Sisley, Signac, Degas, and Henri de Toulouse-Lautrec. He appreciated especially the talent of Toulouse-Lautrec. His portrait Pierre-Marie Olin (1887) closely resembles the style of Toulouse-Lautrec of that time. He managed to invite several of them--including Signac, Forain, and Toulouse-Lautrec--to the next exhibition of Les XX.

=== Third trip to Morocco ===
In December 1887 he was invited, together with Edmond Picard, to accompany a Belgian economic delegation to Meknès, Morocco. During these three months he made many color pencil sketches. He also drew a portrait of the sultan Hassan I. Back in Brussels, he started painting his impressions, relying on his photos, notes and sketches. His Nomad encampment (1887) is probably his first neo-impressionist work. In the Caravan in the mountains past Schliat, the influence of Seurat is unmistakable. His Gate of Mansour-El-Hay in Meknès (1887) and Morocco (the great souk) (1887) are also painted in pointillist style, but still with short strokes and not with points. These are among the rare pointillist paintings of Morocco. When he had finished these paintings, he stopped completely with this Moroccan period in his life. He turned to portraiture, resulting in a series of remarkable neo-impressionist portraits.

=== Pointillism ===
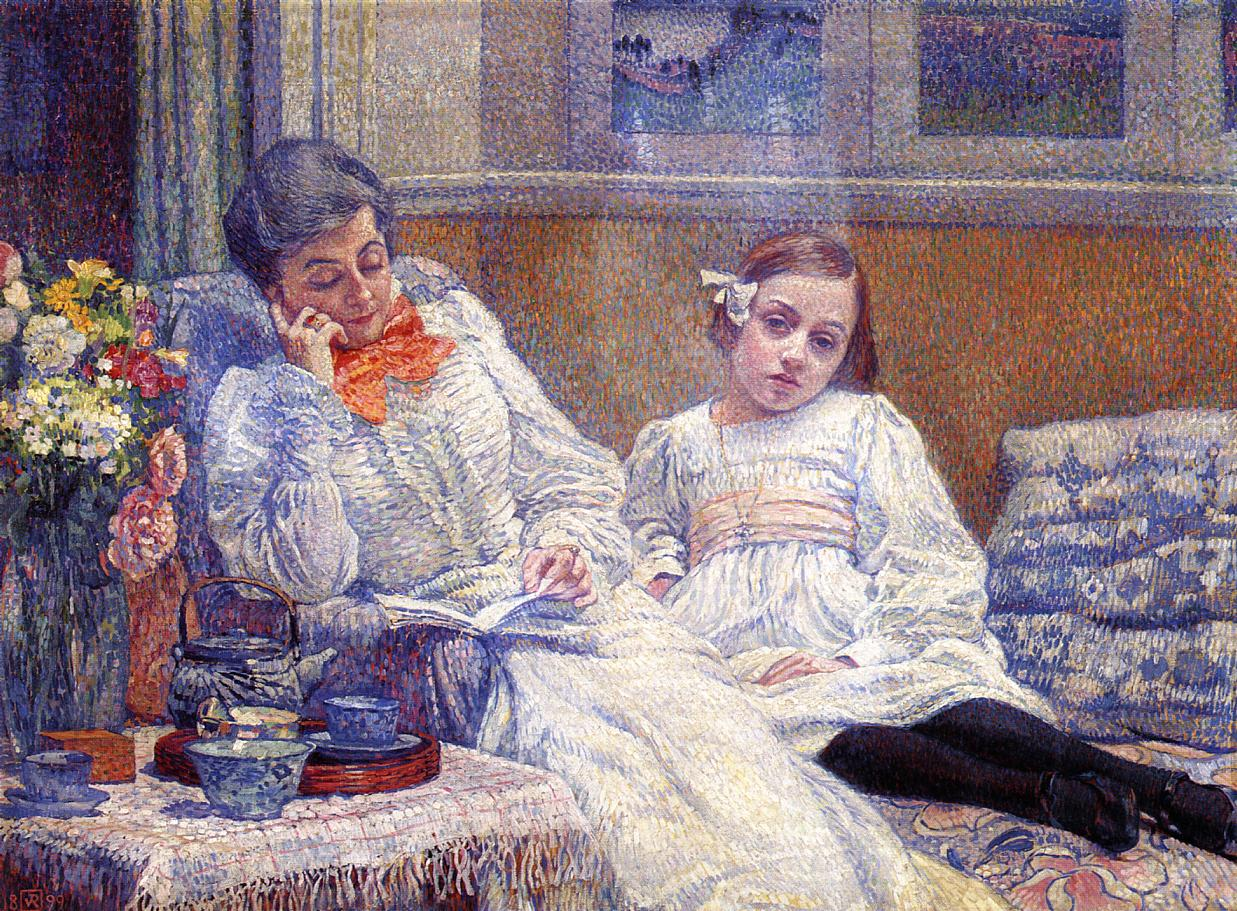
His wife Maria and daughter Elisabeth

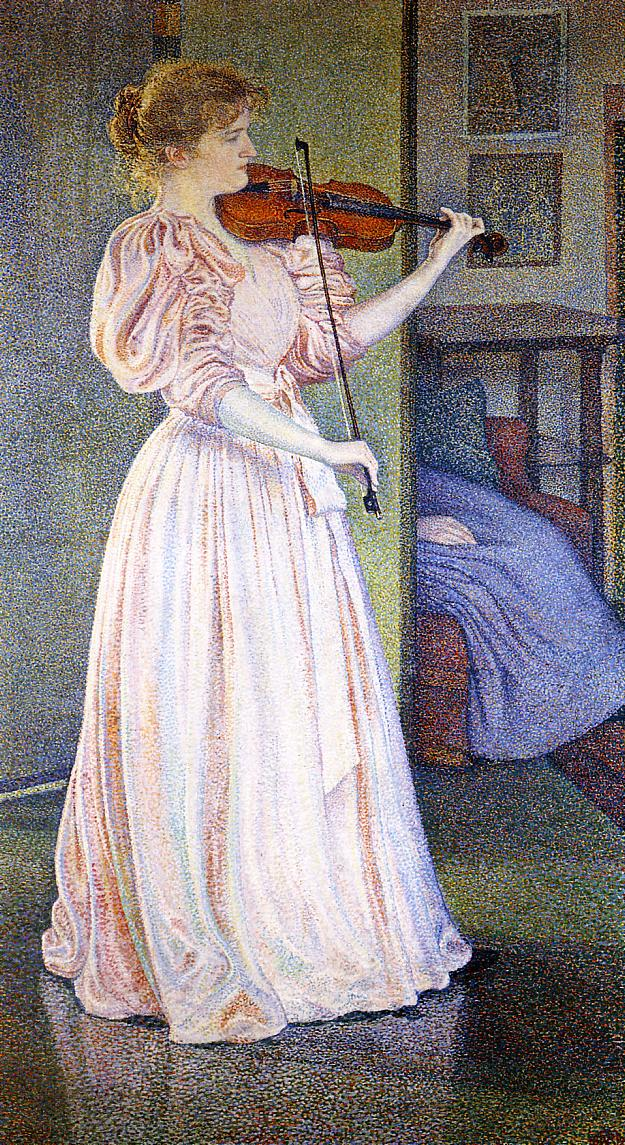
Portrait of Irma Sèthe, showcasing Van Rysselberghe's pointillist technique

His famous portrait of Alice Sèthe (1888) in blue and gold would become a turning point in his life. This time he used merely points in the portrait. She would later marry the sculptor Paul Dubois. Her sister, Maria Sèthe, also a model of van Rysselberghe, would marry the renowned Art Nouveau architect Henry Van de Velde. In that period he made many Neo-impressionistic portraits, such as the portrait of his wife Maria and their daughter Elisabeth. He had married Marie Monnom in 1889. They went on their honeymoon to the south of England and then to Brittany. This would also result in a number of Neo-impressionistic paintings. In Paris he had a meeting with Theo Van Gogh and managed thus to invite Vincent van Gogh to the next exhibition in Brussels. That is where Van Gogh sold Vigne Rouge in Montmajour to Anna Boch, the only painting he ever sold in his lifetime.

Apart from the portraits, he also painted in this period many landscapes and seascapes : "Dunes in Cadzand" (1893), "The rainbow" (1894).

In the 1895 he made long journeys to Athens and Constantinople, Hungary, Romania, Moscow and Saint Petersburg in order to make posters for the "Compagnie des Wagons-lits". One famous work is the poster "Royal Palace Hotel, Ostende" (1899).

In 1897, van Rysselberghe moved to Paris. Along with Paul Signac, Maximilien Luce, Aristide Delannoy, Alexandre Steinlen, Camille Pissarro, Van Dongen, George Willaume, etc., he contributed to the anarchist magazine Les Temps Nouveaux (magazine).

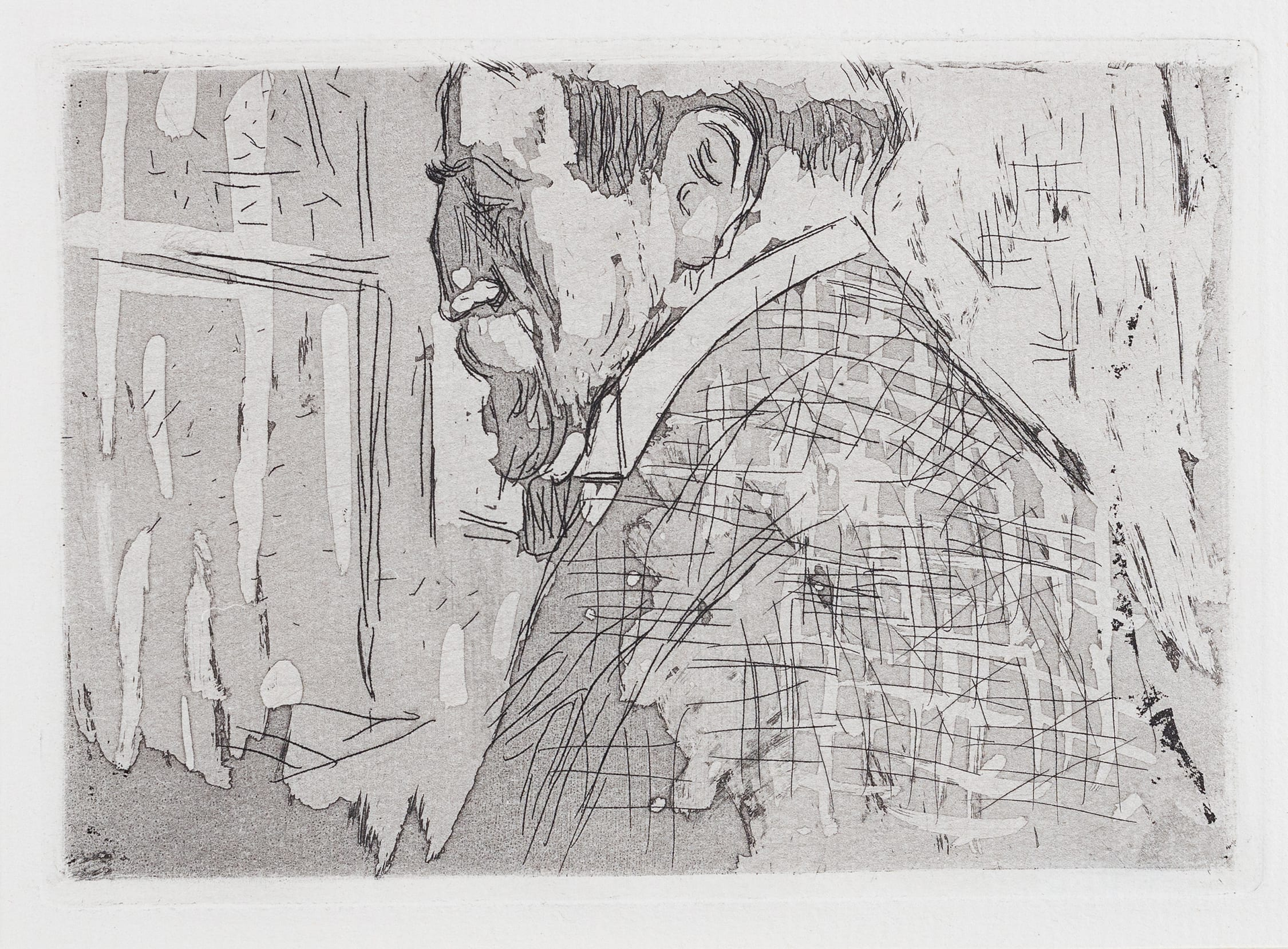
Portrait of Théo Van Rysselberghe (circa 1898) – etching and aquatint by Édouard Vuillard.

In the final years of the 1890s, Théo van Rysselberghe had reached the climax of his Neo-impressionist technique. Slowly he abandoned the use of dots in his portraits and landscapes and began applying somewhat broader strokes : The hippodrome at Boulogne-sur-Mer (1900) and the group portrait Summer afternoon (1900), Young women on the beach (1901), Young girl with straw bonnet (1901), and The Reading (1903) (with the contrast between red and blue colours).

Despite all his years as talent scout for Octave Maus, van Rysselberghe failed to recognize the talent of the young Pablo Picasso (who was in his Blue Period at that time). He found Picasso's works "ugly and uninteresting".

=== Later years ===
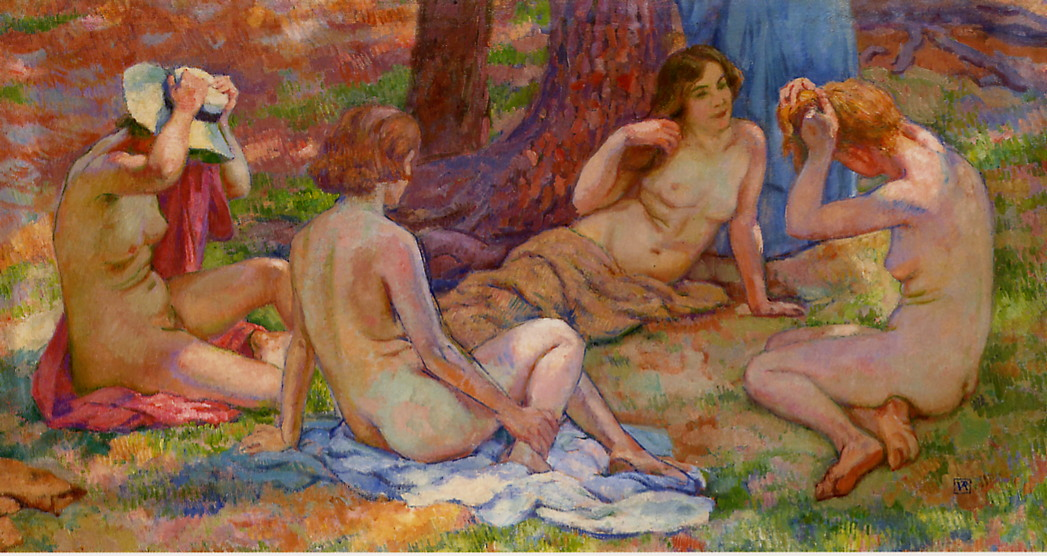
Four bathers

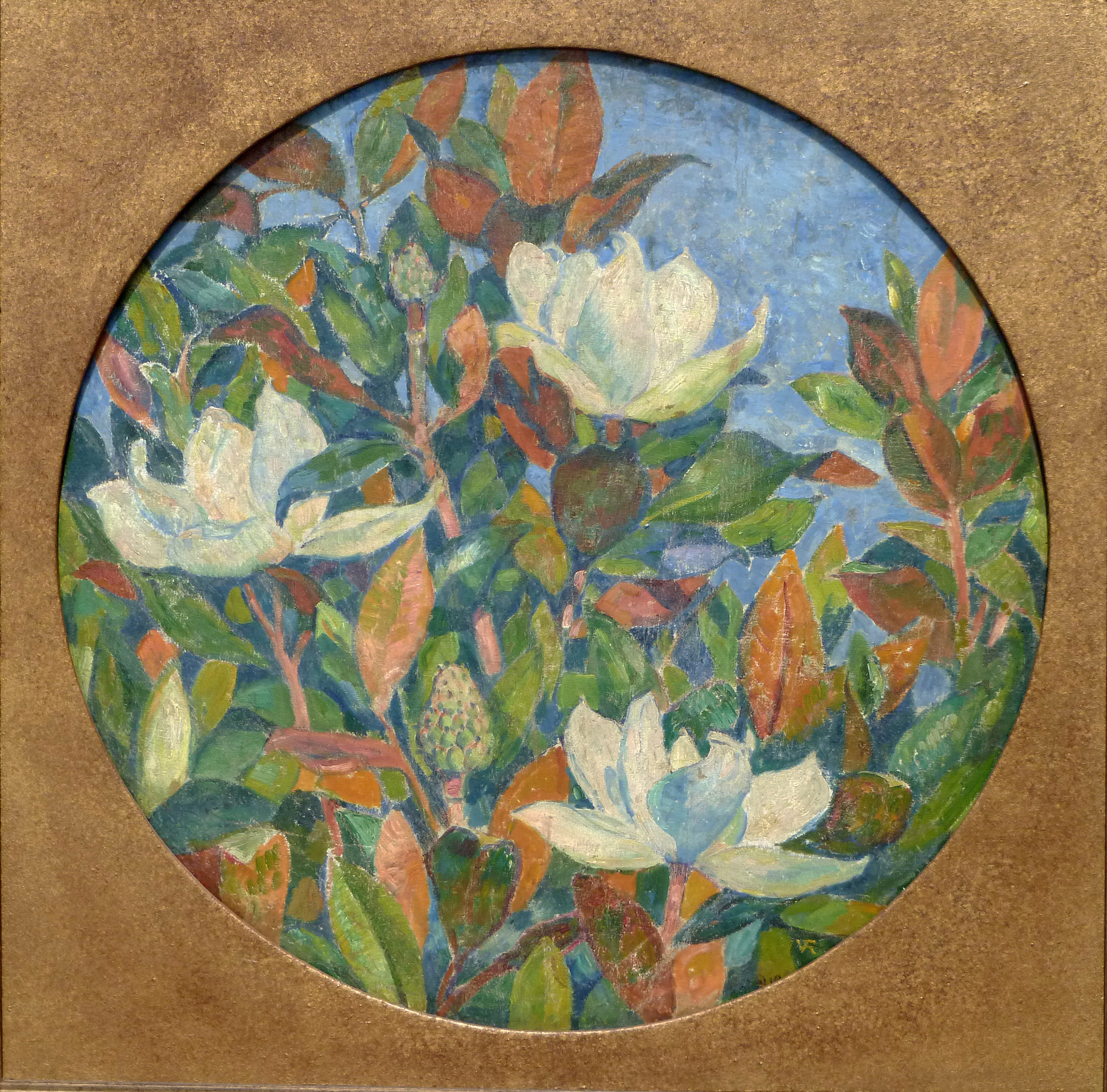
Magnolias (1910), one of his rare flower compositions; private collection

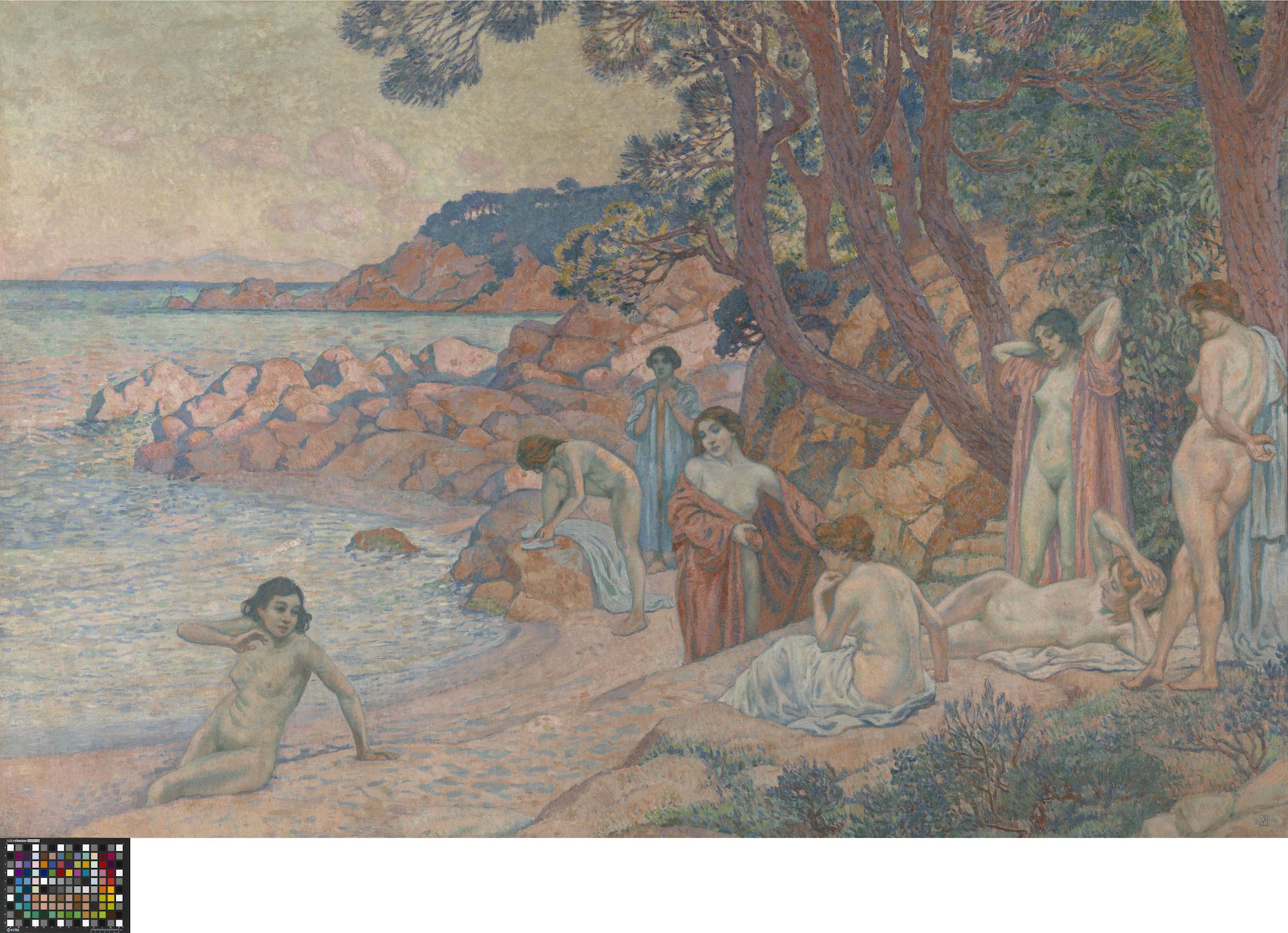
Bathers at Cap Bénat (date unknown) Museum van Deinze en de Leiestreek

After 1903, his pointillist technique, which he had used for so many years, became more relaxed and, after 1910, he abandoned it completely. His strokes had become longer and he used more often vivid colours and more intense contrasts, or softened hues. He had become a master in applying light and heat in his paintings. His Olive trees near Nice (1905) is reminiscent of the technique used by Vincent van Gogh. These longer strokes in red and mauve become prominent in his Bathing ladies under the pine trees at Cavalière (1905).

During the summer of 1907 he visited the island of Jersey, staying at Madeira Villa in St Brelade, where he painted a variety of landscapes, seascapes, flowers and portraits, his most well-known being that of André Gide, his wife Maria and daughter Elisabeth. He enjoyed his stay so much that he and his family returned to the island in 1908.

After some touring on his bike with his friend Henri-Edmond Cross on the Mediterranean coast between Hyères and Monaco, he found an interesting spot in Saint-Clair, where Cross already resided. His brother (and neighbour), the architect Octave van Rysselberghe, built a residence for him there in 1911. Van Rysselberghe then retired to the Côte d'Azur and became increasingly detached from the Brussels art scene.

Here Van Rysselberghe continued painting, mostly landscapes of the Mediterranean coast and portraits (mainly of his wife and daughter, and of his brother Octave). In 1910 he received an order for some large decorative murals and flower compositions for the residence of the family Nocard in Neuilly, France.

From 1905 on the female nude becomes prominent in his monumental paintings : "After the bath" (1910). His painting The vines in October (1912) is painted in lively colours of red, green and blue. One of his last works was Girl in a bath tub (1925).

At the end of his life he also turned to portrait sculpture, such as the Head of André Gide.

He died in Saint-Clair, Var, France on 14 December 1926 and was buried in the cemetery of Lavandou, next to his friend and painter Henri-Edmond Cross.

Many of the works of one of the greatest neo-impressionist painters still remain in private collections. They can only rarely be seen. One recent occasion was the retrospective Théo van Rysselberghe in Brussels, and later in The Hague, between February and September 2006. In November 2005, his work Port Cette (1892) fetched a record 2.6m € at an auction in New York.

== Family ==
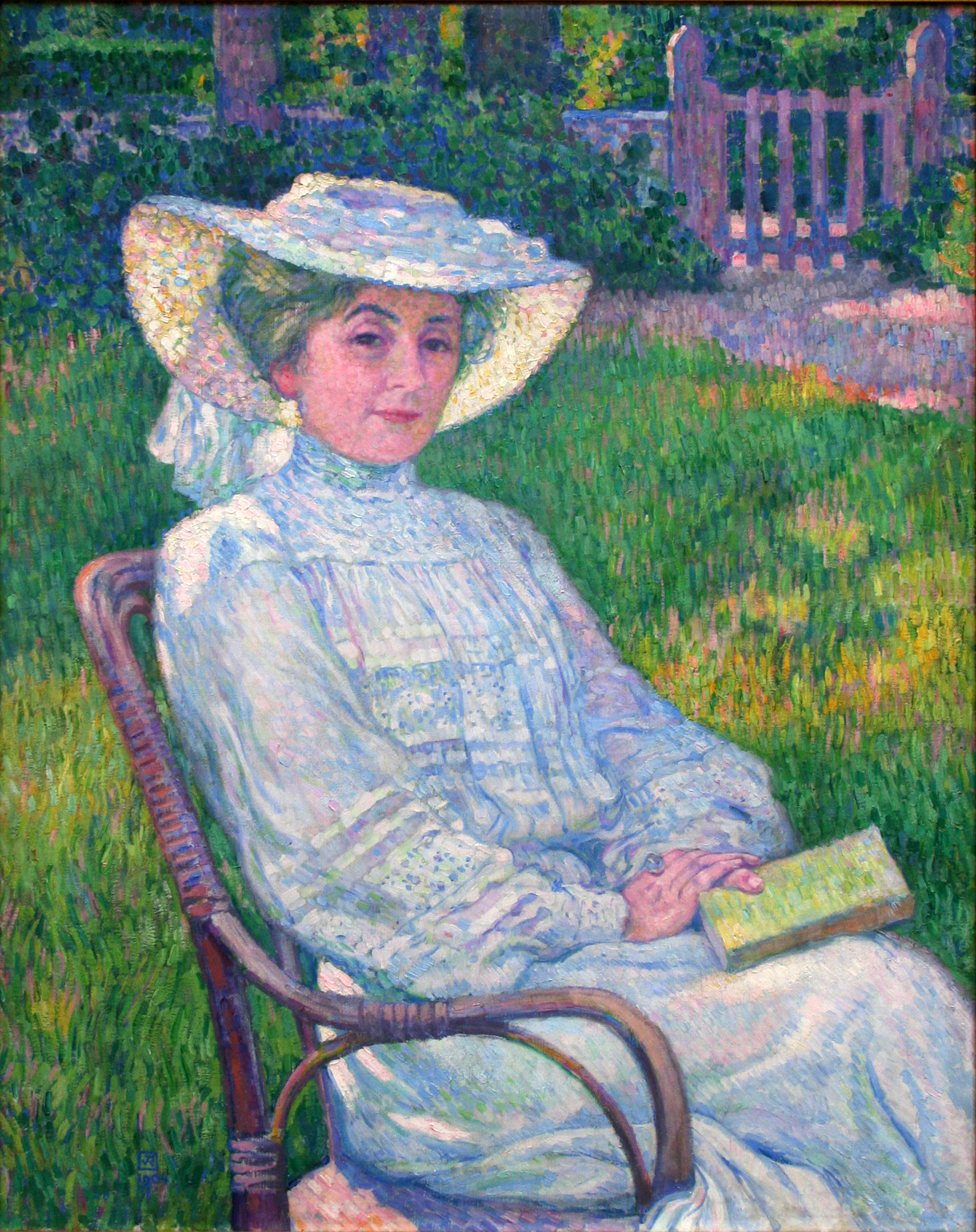
Lady in White – Portrait of Mrs. Théo van Rysselberghe

Van Rysselberghe married Marie Monnom in 1889, with whom he had a daughter, Elizabeth van Rysselberghe. Elizabeth became one of Rupert Brooke's lovers. His brother Octave van Rysselberghe (1855–1929) was a distinguished Belgian architect, who collaborated with Joseph Poelaert and Henry Van de Velde.

== Honours ==
- 1919: Commander of the Order of Leopold.

== Bibliography ==
- Delany, Paul (1987). The Neo-pagans: Rupert Brooke and the ordeal of youth. Free Press. ISBN 978-0-02-908280-5.
- P. & V. Berko, "Dictionary of Belgian painters born between 1750 & 1875", Knokke 1981, p. 719-721.
- Only catalogue raisonné in existence on paintings pastels, watercolours, drawings, etchings, posters (about 1800 entries); including a supplement with a list of works(319 entries) considered not to be genuine. List of signatures and monogrammes; list of letters by van Rysselberghe to different addressees with short contents; bibliography and list of exhibitions. R.Feltkamp, Editions Racine 2003 Brussels. ISBN 2-87386-222-X
- Monography 237 pages R.Feltkamp, Editions Racine 2003 Brussels
- Catalogue of the exhibition "Théo van Rysselberghe" at the "Palais des Beaux Arts", Brussels 'February–May 2006) and the "Gemeentemuseum", The Hague (June–September 2006)
- Catalogue of the exhibition "Théo van Rysselberghe : neo-impressionist" at the "Museum of Fine Arts", Ghent 1993
