= Achille Chainaye =

Belgian sculptor (1862–1915)

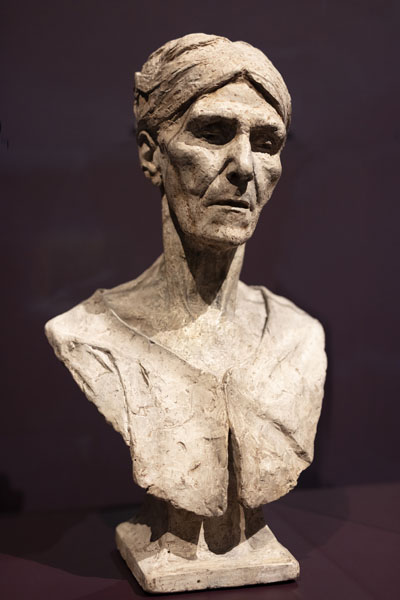
Deaf-mute (1885) Groeningemuseum, Brugge

Achille Chainaye (26 August 1862 – 20 December 1915) was a Belgian sculptor.

He was born in Liège. After moving to Brussels to study at the Académie Royale des Beaux-Arts he became a member of the Groupe des XX. He turned to journalism and went to London to work, where he died.

== Source ==
- RKD.nl (in Dutch)
- Wallonie-en-ligne.net: Achille Chainaye (in French)
