= Léon Frédéric =

Belgian Symbolist painter

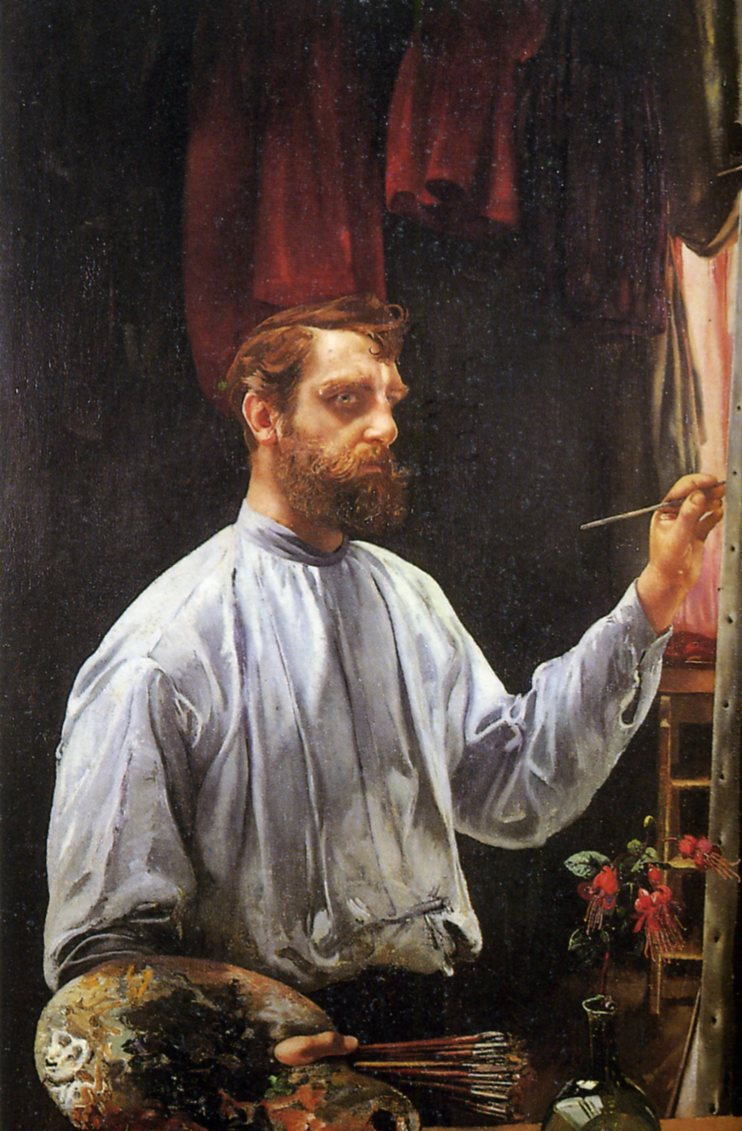
- Self-portrait
- Born: Léon-Henri-Marie Frédéric; 26 August 1856; Brussels, Belgium
- Died: 27 January 1940 (aged 83); Schaerbeek, Belgium
- Education: Académie Royale des Beaux-Arts
- Known for: Painting, printmaking
- Movement: Symbolism

Léon-Henri-Marie Frédéric (26 August 1856 – 27 January 1940) was a Belgian Symbolist painter. His earliest paintings joined Christian mysticism with pantheistic themes, while his later works increasingly reflected social concerns. Much of his work also shows the influence of fifteenth and sixteenth century Flemish art and Renaissance painting styles.

== Biography ==
His father was a prosperous jeweler. In 1871, he was apprenticed to the architect and decorative painter, Charle-Albert and began taking night courses at the Académie Royale des Beaux-Arts in Brussels. In 1874, he found a position in the workshop of Jean-François Portaels. The following year, he and several other young art students engaged a private studio where they could paint from live, nude models. From 1876 to 1878, he entered the Prix de Rome, but was not successful. Finally, his father financed a trip for studies in Italy from 1878 to 1879. There, he travelled to Naples, Rome, Florence and Venice. His favorite painters were Sandro Botticelli and Domenico Ghirlandaio.

On his return from Italy, he made his debut at the Brussels Salon, where he came under the influence of Jules Bastien-Lepage, and became a member of the artist group L'Essor. In 1883, he moved to Vresse-sur-Semois, in the Belgian Ardennes, and traveled extensively to England, Germany and the Netherlands. He was awarded a gold medal at the Exposition Universelle (1889). The young Alexandre Benois was a great admirer of his works and, in 1898, arranged for several to be purchased by Princess Maria Tenisheva, for an exhibition in St. Petersburg.

After his marriage, he moved to his final home in Schaerbeek in 1899, and continued to travel and exhibit his work in international fairs, winning awards in the United States and Germany and another gold medal at the Exposition Universelle (1900).

In 1904, he was appointed a member of the Académie Royale and, in 1929, was created a Baron and a Knight of the Order of Leopold by King Albert I.

His works may be seen at the Museum of Ixelles, Royal Museums of Fine Arts of Belgium, Museum of Fine Arts, Ghent and the Musée d'Orsay. The Four Seasons is currently on display at the Philadelphia Museum of Art. The Chalks Sellers and The Stream are currently displayed at the Royal Museums of Fine Arts, Brussels. A street in Schaerbeek has been named after him.

== Selected paintings ==
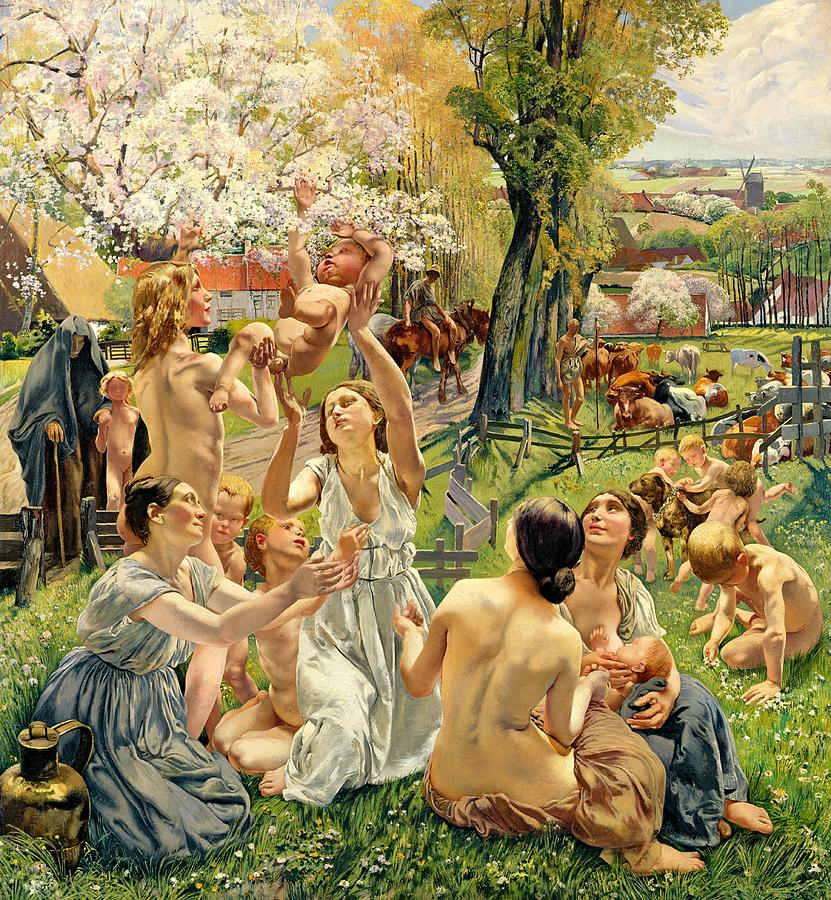
The Golden Age (Morning)

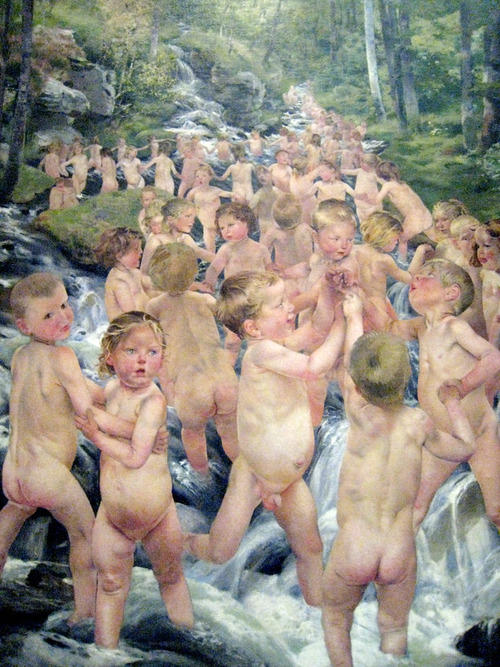
The Source of Life

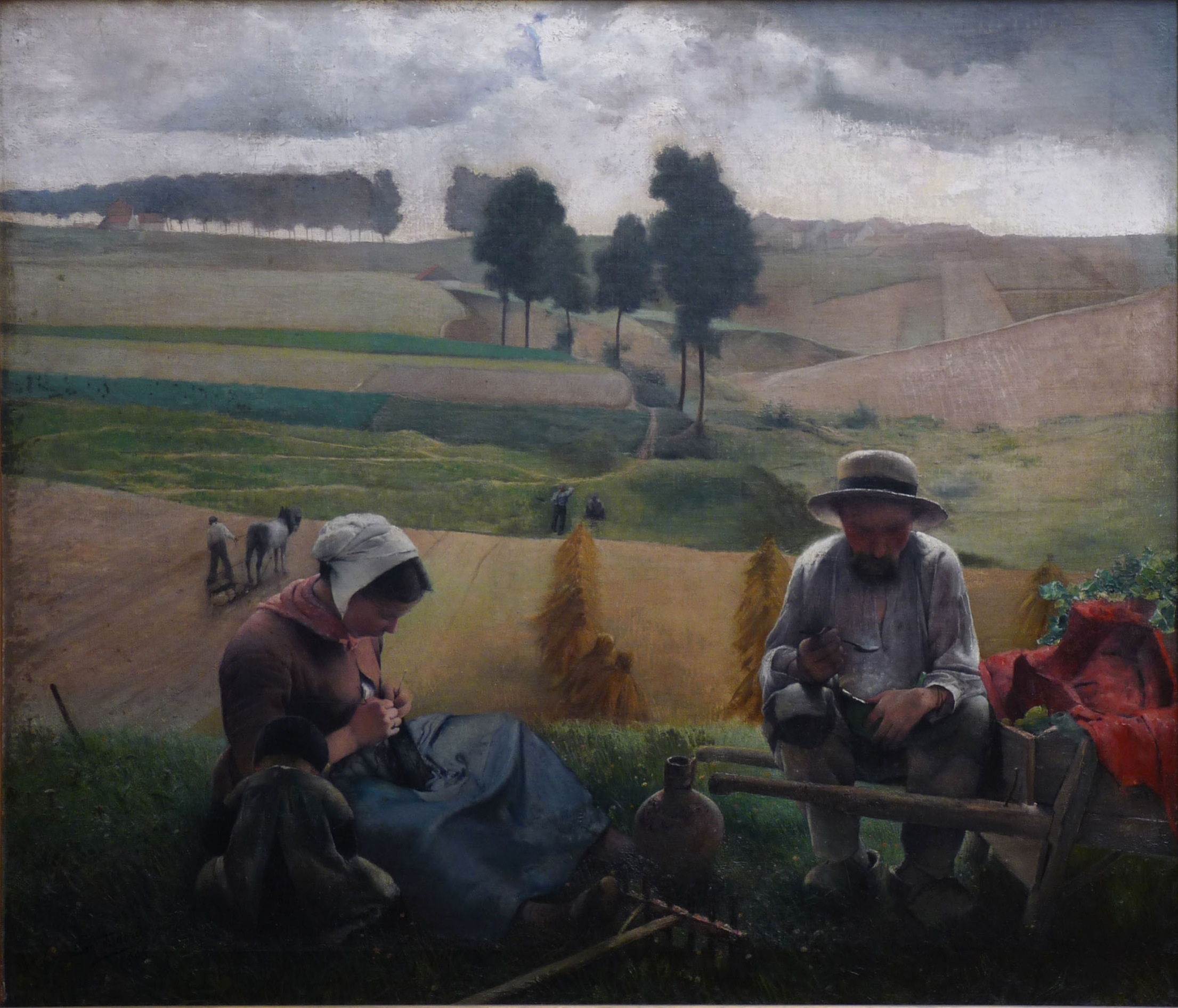
The Plowman's Afternoon Tea

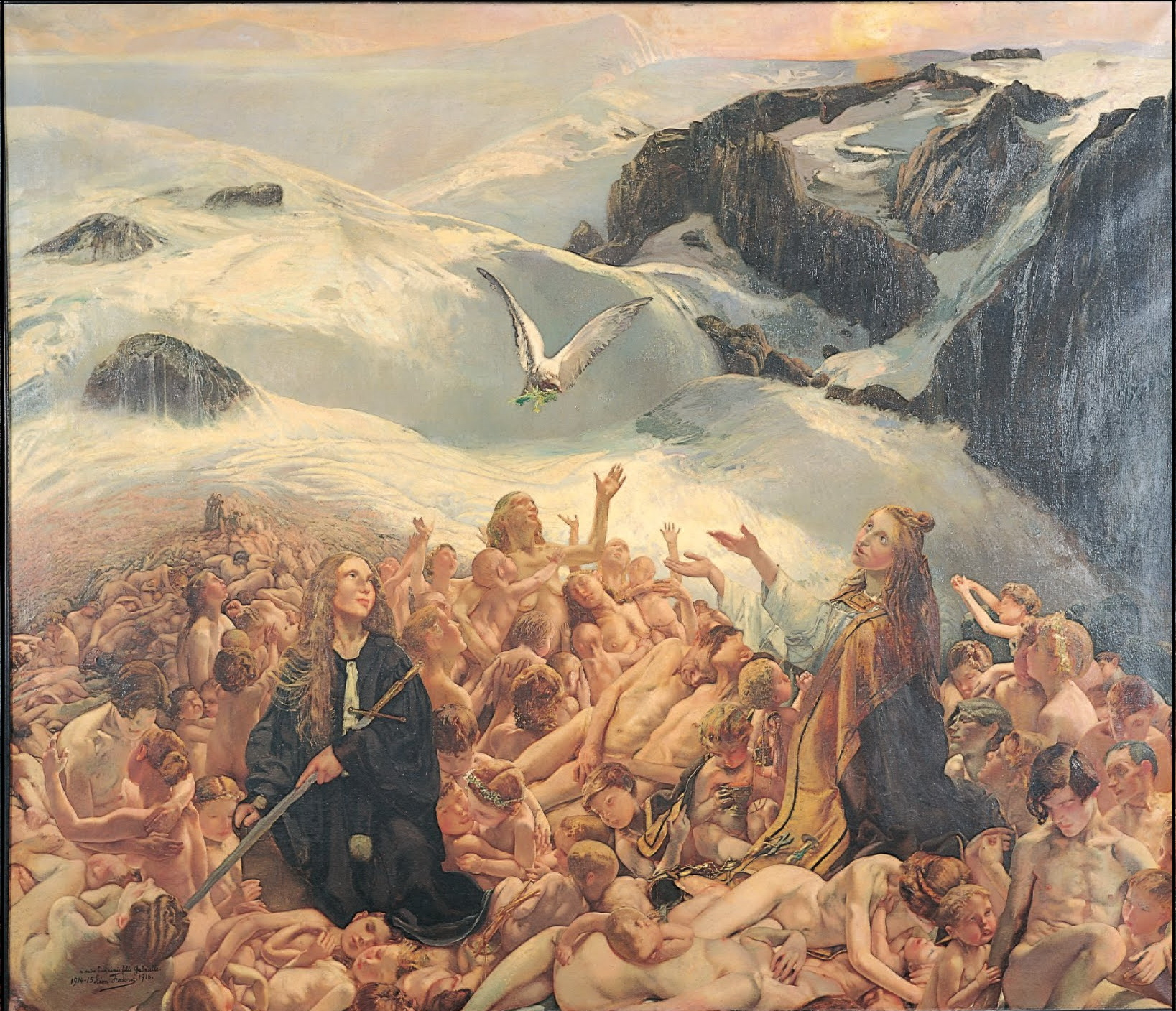
All Things Die, But All Will Be Resurrected through God's Love (center panel)

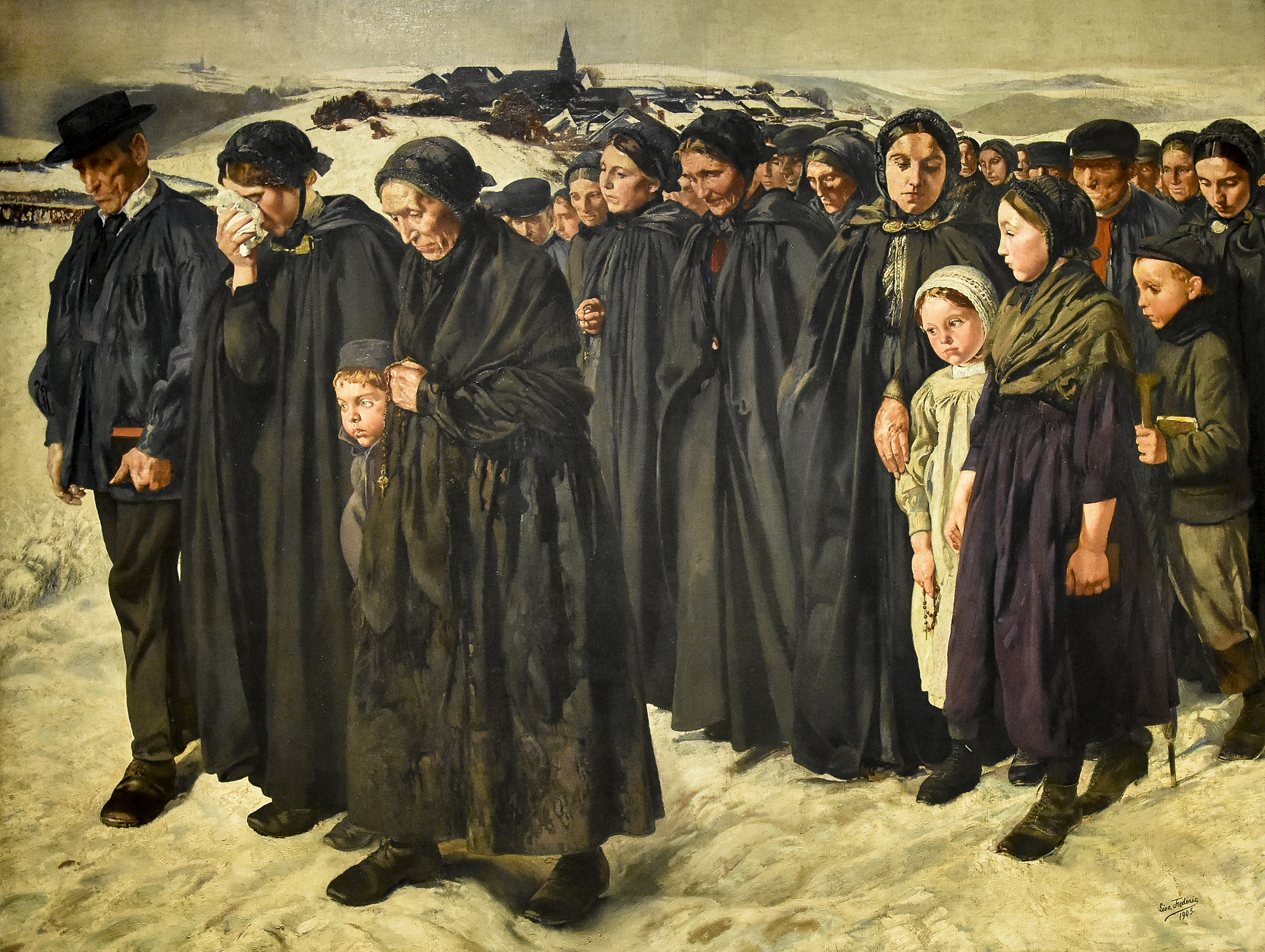
Burial of a Farmer

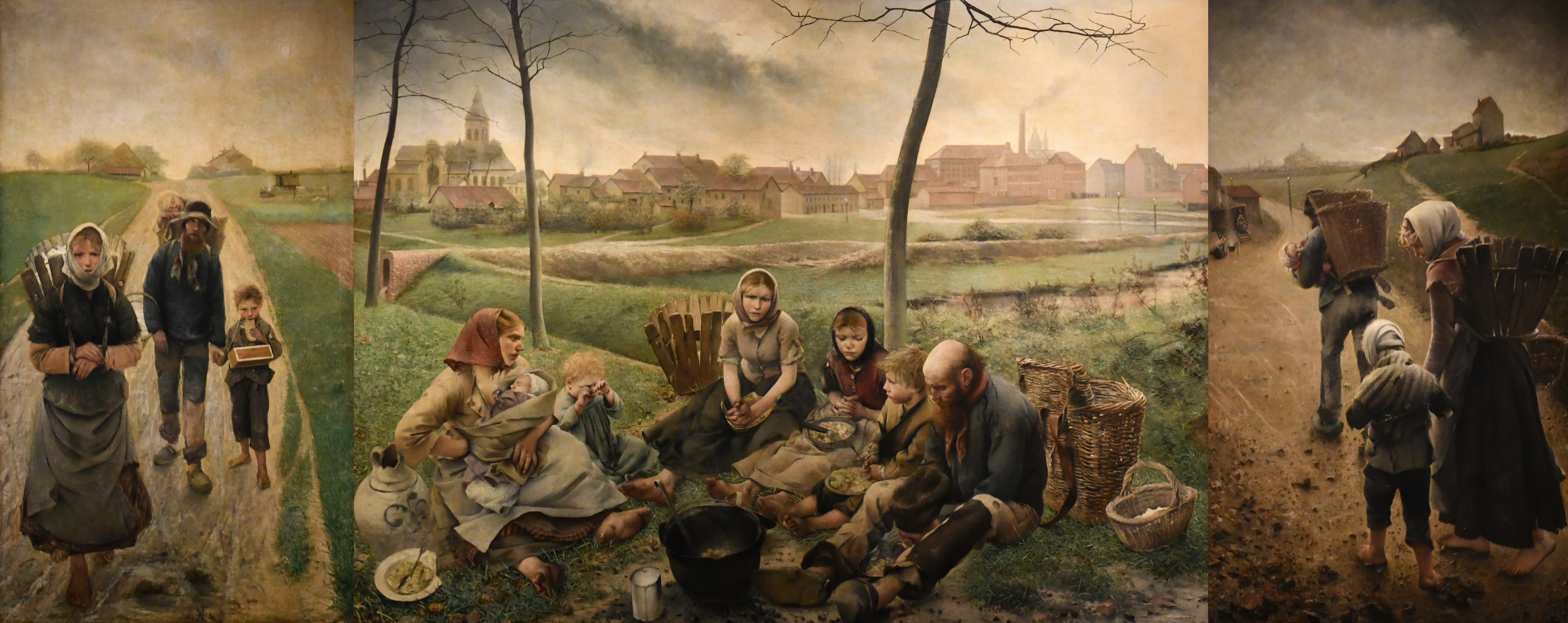
The chalk sellers - Triptysh - 1882/1883

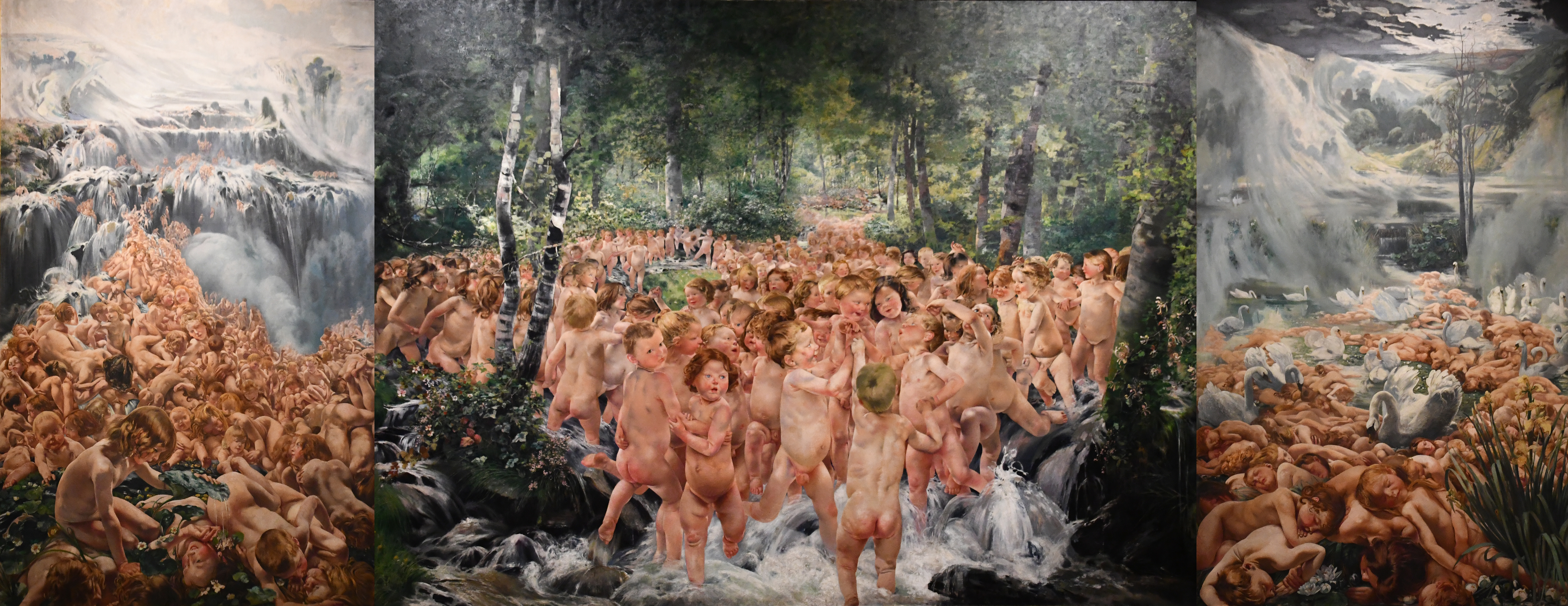
The Stream (Le Ruisseau) - Triptysh - 1890–1899

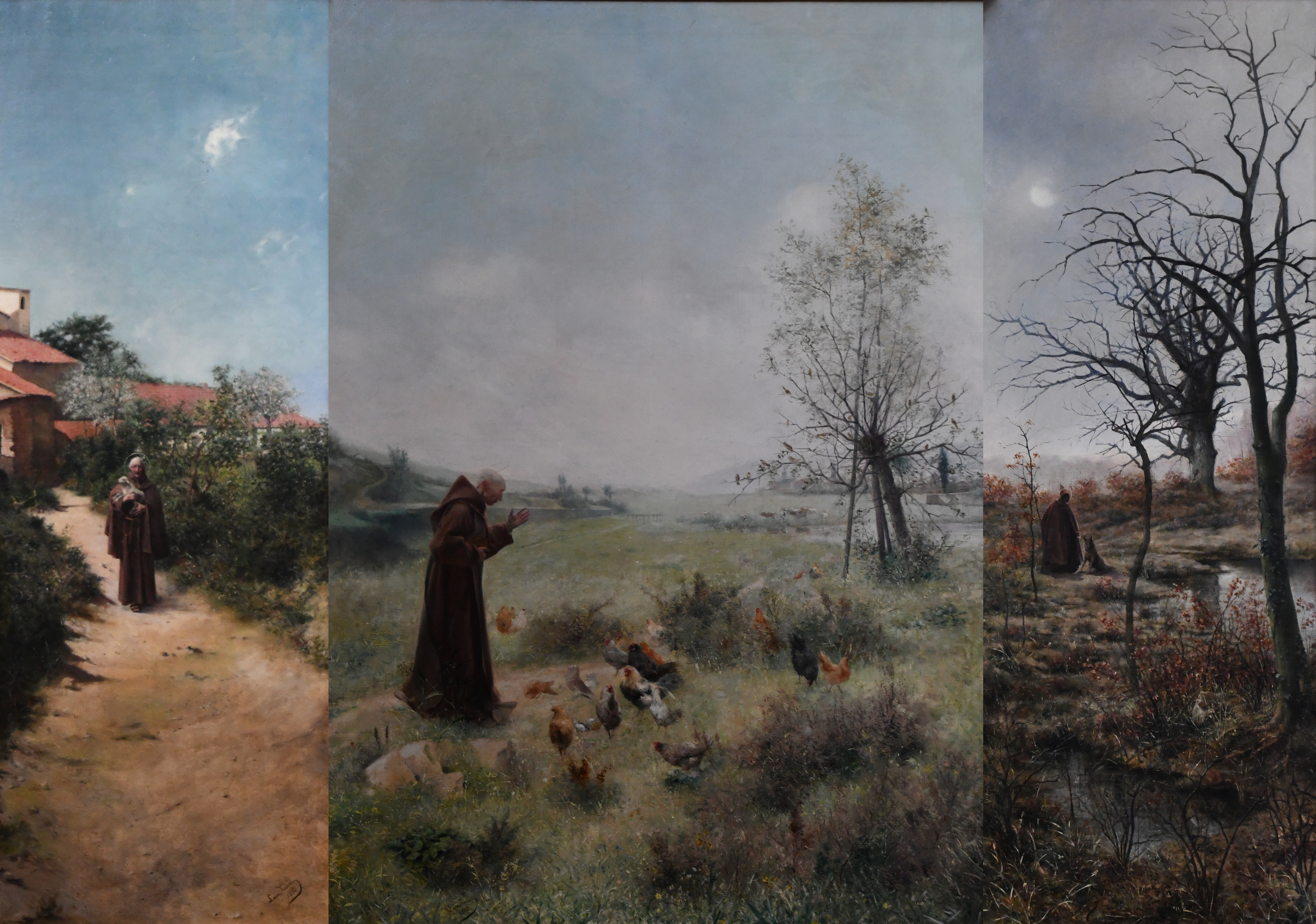
The Triptych of The Legende Of Saint François - 1882

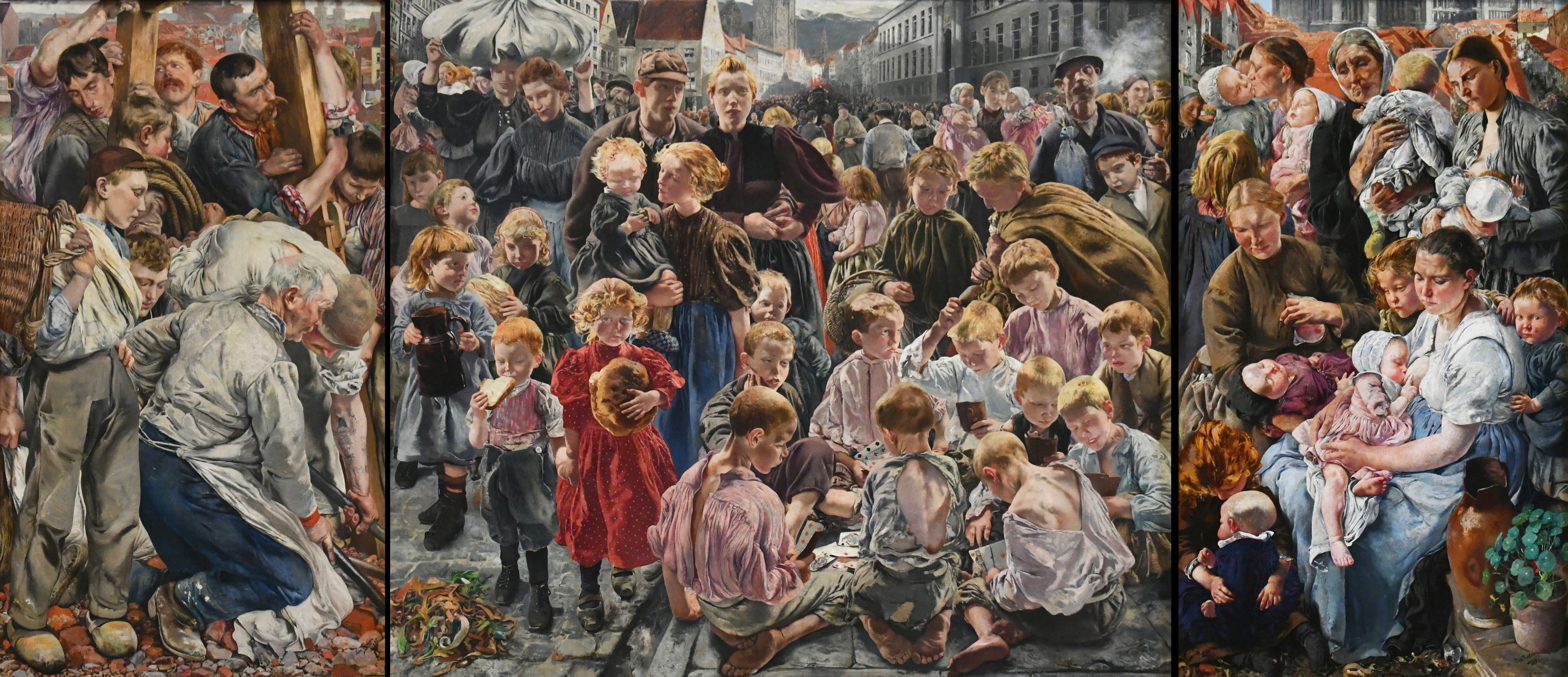
The Ages Of Workers - Triptysh - 1895–1897

The people will one day see the sunrise, 1890-1891
