= Guillaume Vogels =

Belgian painter

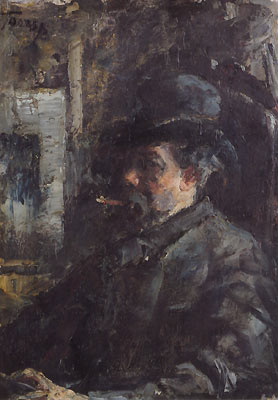
- Guillaume Vogels; portrait by Jan Toorop
- Born: Guillaume Vogels; 9 June 1836; Brussels, Belgium
- Died: 9 January 1896 (aged 59); Ixelles, Belgium
- Education: Barbizon school
- Occupation: Painter

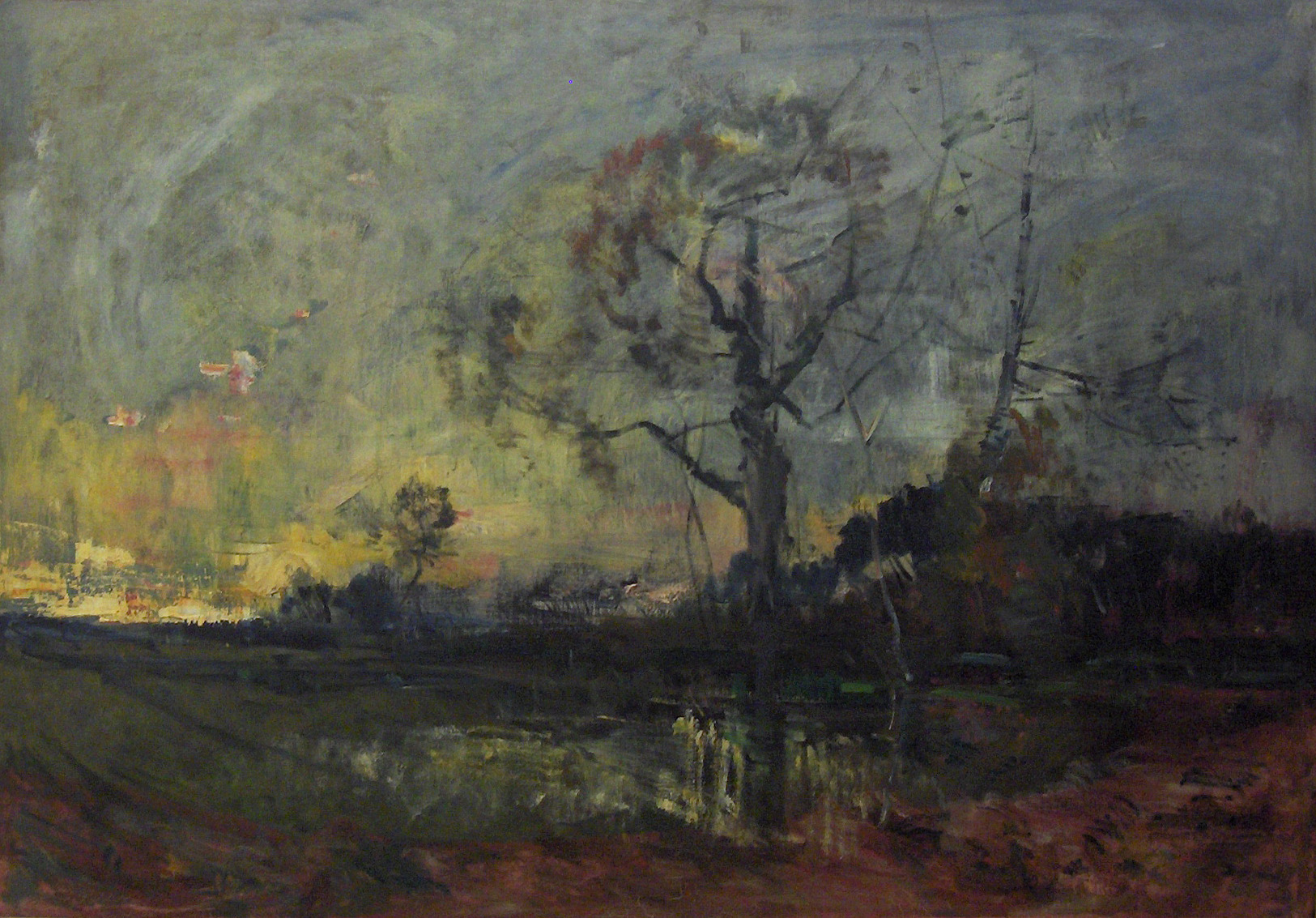
Dusk Over the Pool

Guillaume Vogels (9 June 1836, in Brussels – 9 January 1896, in Ixelles) was a Belgian Impressionist painter.

== Life ==
He was the son of a laborer. After his primary education, he was apprenticed to the Bellis Brothers, a house painting and decoration firm, and received a master certificate in 1855. He later owned his own decorating company in Brussels. One of his employees there was the Greek painter Périclès Pantazis, who became his lifelong friend, introducing him to the works of Gustave Courbet and Édouard Manet and showing him the techniques of painting with the palette knife.

In 1870, he went to Paris, where he came under the influence of the Barbizon school. His first exhibition was at Ghent in 1874, but his work was not well received by the critics. He achieved a career breakthrough only in 1880, when he participated in the Paris Salon. In 1884, he became a member of Les XX, a secessionist group. This led to a meeting with James Ensor. The two apparently travelled together on study tours to England and the Netherlands and some critics cite Vogels as a significant influence on Ensor. After Les XX was disbanded in 1893, he participated in the creation of a new group called La Libre Esthétique.

He kept no written records and left his works undated, which makes it difficult to establish a chronology showing the development of his style. Some influence from the Old Masters seems to mark his later paintings, although many display a loose brushwork that appears to anticipate Expressionist techniques.
