= Willy Schlobach =

German-Belgian painter

Willy Schlobach (Brussels, 27 August 1864 – Nonnenhorn, 1951) was a German-Belgian painter. In 1884, he was one of the founders of Les XX, a group of artists known for their hazy atmospheric paintings. In 1887, he moved to London, and by the end of the decade, his work was increasingly characterized by neo-impressionistic influences, but after 1894 he returned to his earlier impressionist style.

While he spent his youth in Belgium, both his parents and wife were German. During his "Belgian" period, he befriended the Belgian painters James Ensor and Willy Finch when all three attended the Académie Royale des Beaux-Arts in Brussels. This period came to an end soon after Germany invaded Belgium during the onset of World War I as his pro-German sympathies clashed with the rising anti-German sentiment. He then moved to Germany, where he remained until his death in 1951.
