= Verner Thomé =

Finnish Post-Impressionist graphic artist (1878–1953)

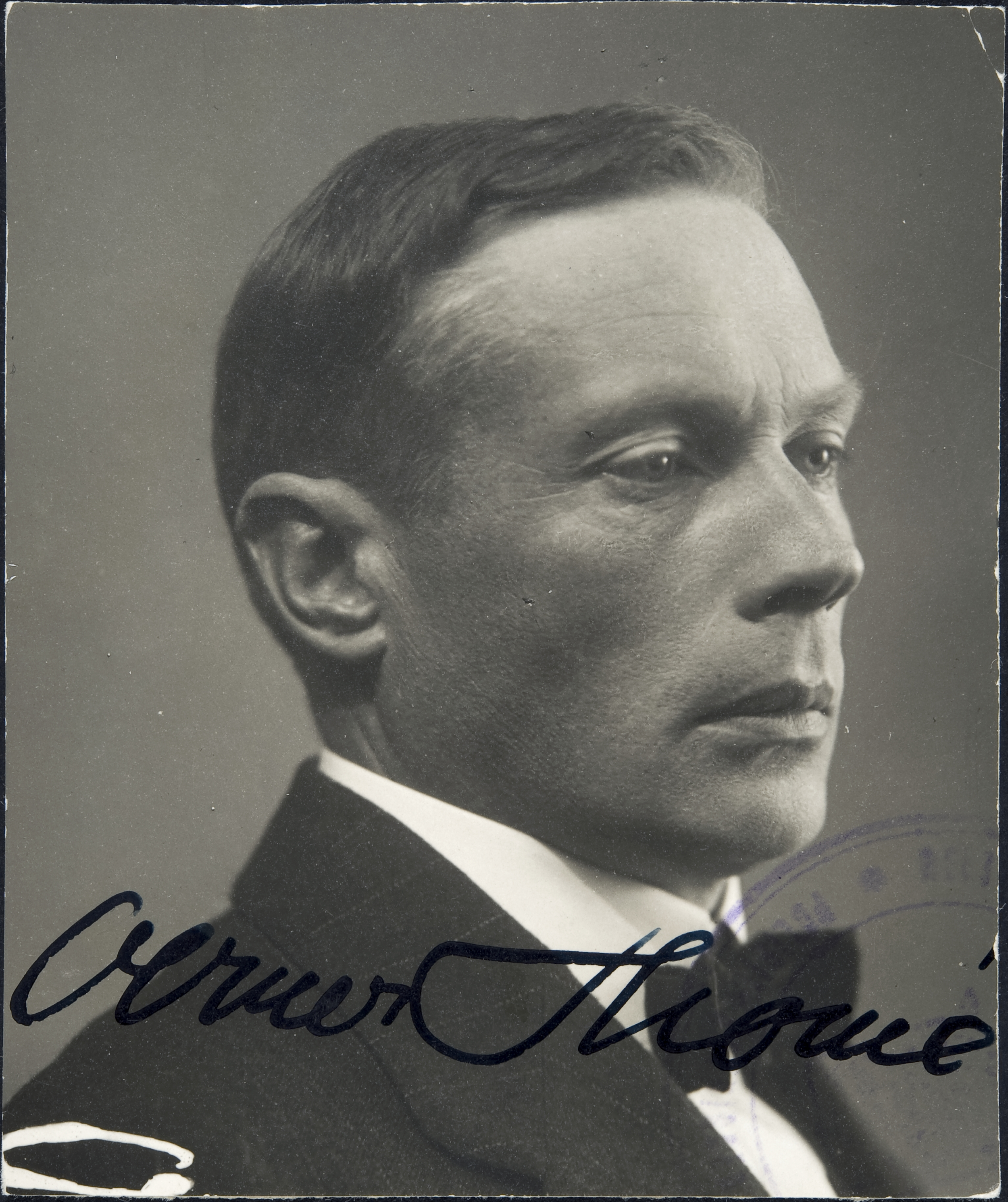
- Thomé, c. 1923
- Born: 4 July 1878; Alajärvi, Grand Duchy of Finland
- Died: 1 June 1953 (aged 74); Helsinki, Finland
- Occupation: Post-Impressionist graphic artist
- Years active: 1899—1953

Verner Thomé (4 July 1878 – 1 June 1953) was a Finnish Post-Impressionist graphic artist. He was influenced by Vitalism a German-Scandinavian movement that incorporated Nietzsche's philosophy.

== Life ==
Thomé was born on 4 July 1878 in Alajärvi, Grand Duchy of Finland, the son of Johan Thome (a forestry officer) and Agnes Thome (née Wallin). He was one of eight children.

His first job was at the Tilgmans Lithographical Company, which commissioned posters from Finnish artists. At the same time he attended the Helsinki University Art School, where he was taught drawing by Fredrik Ahlstedt and Albert Gebhard. In 1898–99, he attended the drawing school at the Finnish League of Artists, under Helene Schjerfbeck, but left because of poor health.

He spent 1901 and 1902 in Munich at the Bavarian Royal Academy of Art, studying under the animal-painter H. Zugel and the portraitist Ludwig von Herterich. At this time he painted in a realistic style. Between 1903 and 1910 he spent his summers with Magnus Enckell at Hogland (Suursaari Island) on the southern Finnish coast.

He first came to prominence in 1903 when he exhibited in Helsinki at the Exhibition of Finnish Artists, and then in 1904 he visited Paris, Spain and Morocco. On his return to Finland he adopted a darker palette. In 1906, he spent time in Italy and in 1908, in southern France; after which he became interested in representing light and shade through color contrasts (his Borely Park is representative of this period).

In 1909, he co-founded the Septem Group of colorists with Alfred William Finch, Magnus Enckell, Yrjö Ollila, Mikko Oinonen, Juho Rissanen, and Ellen Thesleff. Their inspiration came from the 1904 Impressionist and Neo-impressionist Franco-Belgian Exhibition in Helsinki that included works by Paul Signac and Henri-Edmond Cross. Thomé exhibited at all Septem Group exhibitions (1912–1920), and the Exhibition of Finnish Art in Stockholm (1916), St Petersburg (1917), Copenhagen (1919) and Gothenburg (1923). In 1922, he became a member of the Fine Arts Academy of Finland; and in 1941, was awarded an honorary professorship. Between 1920 and 1950, he painted many portraits and watercolor paintings.

Thomé died on 1 June 1953 in Helsinki, Finland, aged 74.

== Vitalism ==
Vitalism had a light palette that replaced the dowdy palette of National Romanticism in the early years of the 20th century. It adopted a positivist view of life, being a development of the tradition of figure painting where the male nude is a symbol of power shown against the sea, the sun and forces of nature.

== Some paintings ==
- In Borely Park (1909) [Ateneum Art Museum, Helsinki]
- Bathing Boys (1910) [Ateneum Art Museum]
- Playing Children (1913). Possibly commissioned for Helsinki Central railway station. In the Hörhammer family collection.

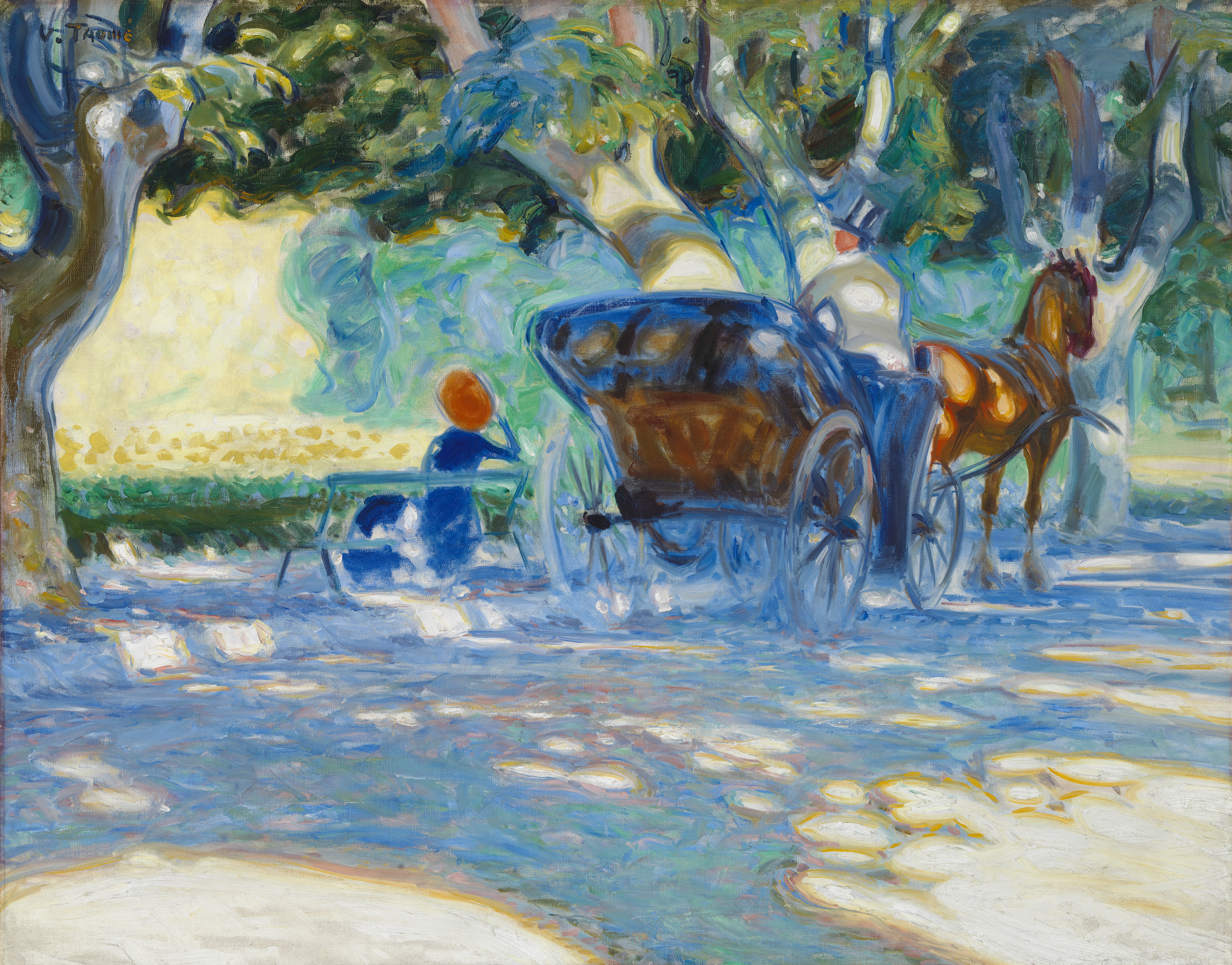
Verner Thomé - Borélyn puistossa - (In Borlery Park)
