= Axel Enckell =

Imperial Russian officer and administrator (1866–1921)

Axel Woldemar Enckell
- Axel Woldemar Enckell

District Chief of Lechkhumi
- In office 31 January 1907 – 4 January 1915
- Monarch: Nicholas II

Arbitrator of the 3rd section, Etchmiadzin
- In office 22 December 1905 – January 1907
- Monarch: Nicholas II

District Chief of Nakhchivan
- In office 27 October 1900 – 22 December 1905
- Monarch: Nicholas II

Personal details
- Born: 4 September 1866 Vehkalahti, Grand Duchy of Finland, Russian Empire
- Died: 28 April 1921 (aged 54) Volsk, Saratov Governorate, Russian SFSR
- Spouse: Anna Hessel
- Relations: Magnus Enckell (brother)
- Parent(s): Carl Vilhelm Enckell; Alexandra Fredrika Vendla Helena Appelberg
- Education: Finnish Cadet Corps; Nikolayev General Staff Academy
- Occupation: Military officer and administrator
- Military career
- Allegiance: Russian Empire (Russian Soviet Federative Socialist Republic) Russian SFSR
- Branch: Imperial Russian Army; Red Army
- Service years: 1886–1900, 1915–1920
- Rank: Polkovnik (colonel)
- Units: 23rd Artillery Brigade; 77th Tenginsky Infantry Regiment
- Conflicts: World War I; Caucasus campaign; Russian Civil War
- Awards: Order of Saint Vladimir, 3rd class with swords (1916); Order of Saint Vladimir, 4th class (1903), with swords and bow (1915); Order of Saint Anna, 2nd class (1909); Order of Saint Stanislaus, 2nd class (1907)

Axel Woldemar Enckell (Russian: Аксель-Вальдемар Карлович Энкель, Aksel-Valdemar Karlovich Enkel; 4 September 1866 – 1921) was an Imperial Russian officer and administrative official of Finnish-Swedish noble origin. Trained as an artilleryman, he spent most of his career in the civil administration of the Caucasus Viceroyalty, serving as acting district chief (uezdny nachalnik) of the Nakhichevansky Uyezd during the Armenian–Tatar massacres of 1905–1907 and later as district chief of Lechkhumi in western Georgia, where in 1908 he initiated the official inquiry into the reputed burial place of Maximus the Confessor near the Muri fortress. Recalled to the army in 1915, he served with the 77th Tenginsky Infantry Regiment on the Caucasian and Eastern fronts, reaching the rank of colonel (polkovnik). He was one of the few senior officers of the imperial army to join the Bolsheviks in 1917, and afterwards served in the Red Army.

== Early life and family ==
Enckell was born on 4 September 1866 at the vicarage in Vehkalahti, the rural parish adjoining Fredrikshamn in the Grand Duchy of Finland, into the noble Enckell family, inscribed under entry no. 137 in the Finnish House of Nobility. His father was Carl Vilhelm Enckell (1818–1883), a Lutheran dean (rovasti), and his mother Alexandra Fredrika Vendla Helena Appelberg (1832–1914). Among his siblings was the Finnish Symbolist painter Magnus Enckell (1870–1925). He was a Lutheran.

He married Anna Hessel.

== Career ==
Enckell was educated at the Finnish Cadet Corps in Hamina and at the Nicholas Academy of the General Staff, which he completed in the second category. He entered service on 11 August 1886 and was commissioned second lieutenant into the 23rd Artillery Brigade, with seniority from 7 August 1885. He was promoted lieutenant with seniority from 7 August 1889, staff captain from 25 July 1895 and captain from 6 May 1900, and was transferred to the reserve on 27 October 1900. He was subsequently carried on the rolls of the army infantry.

== Civil administration in the Caucasus ==
On leaving the active list Enckell entered the civil and police administration of the Ministry of Internal Affairs in the Caucasus Viceroyalty. He served as senior assistant to the district chief of Shusha, and from 27 October 1900 as acting district chief of the Nakhichevansky Uyezd in the Erivan Governorate.

=== Administrative and cross-border duties ===
In January 1900, Enckell presided over a three-day regional congress of local silkworm breeders in Nakhchivan intended to regulate the sericulture trade, and was acknowledged for the work by Viceroy Prince Grigory Golitsyn and Governor Count Vladimir Tiesenhausen. In early 1903 he worked with the local city elder, Jafargulu Khan Nakhchivanski, to organise a mobile ophthalmic expedition sent to treat widespread eye disease in the region.

Because Nakhchivan was the principal Russian transit station before the Qajar Iranian border, Enckell and the local archpriest, Father Ananias Ksenodokhov, regularly arranged travel, logistical clearance and security escorts for Russian personnel and ecclesiastical convoys bound for the Russian Ecclesiastical Mission in Urmia. Church bulletins of the period commended Enckell for his assistance to travellers crossing the frontier.

=== 1905 unrest and contemporary accounts ===
During the Russian Revolution of 1905, inter-ethnic violence between the Armenian and Azerbaijani (then commonly termed "Tatar") populations broke out across the South Caucasus. Nakhchivan saw deadly communal rioting, looting and arson in May and November 1905.

As head of the local civil administration, Enckell was sharply criticised over the imperial authorities' inability or reluctance to contain the clashes. The Azerbaijani writer and eyewitness Mammad Said Ordubadi, in his chronicle Qanlı illər (Bloody Years), referred repeatedly to Enckell — transcribed phonetically as "nachalnik Angil" or "politsmeyster Angel" — alongside the garrison commander, Colonel Krylov, criticising their conduct of negotiations with community representatives, delays in disarming the belligerents, and failure to restore public security.

The Italian writer Luigi Villari, who visited Nakhchivan in the autumn of 1905 while researching Fire and Sword in the Caucasus (1906), described Enckell and his deputy Georgi Gogoberidze as "bitterly anti-Armenian". He recorded that Enckell was away from the town at the time, obliging Villari to take testimony instead from his deputy and from members of the local Nakhchivanski khans.

Enckell's conduct also became a point of dispute between the officials sent to pacify the district. According to a report to the Viceroy of the Caucasus by Major General Maksud Alikhanov-Avarsky, who had been sent to Nakhchivan in May 1905 with extraordinary powers, Alikhanov had forbidden Enckell to flog Muslim residents, on the grounds that the floggings were being administered in the presence of the victims' families and that corporal punishment had recently been abolished. At a meeting in Nakhchivan that June the newly appointed governor-general of Erivan, Prince Louis-Napoleon, objected to the prohibition, refused Alikhanov's request that Enckell be recalled from the district, restored the use of corporal punishment, and directed that Enckell should report on all matters to the governor of Erivan, Vladimir Tiesenhausen, rather than to Alikhanov.

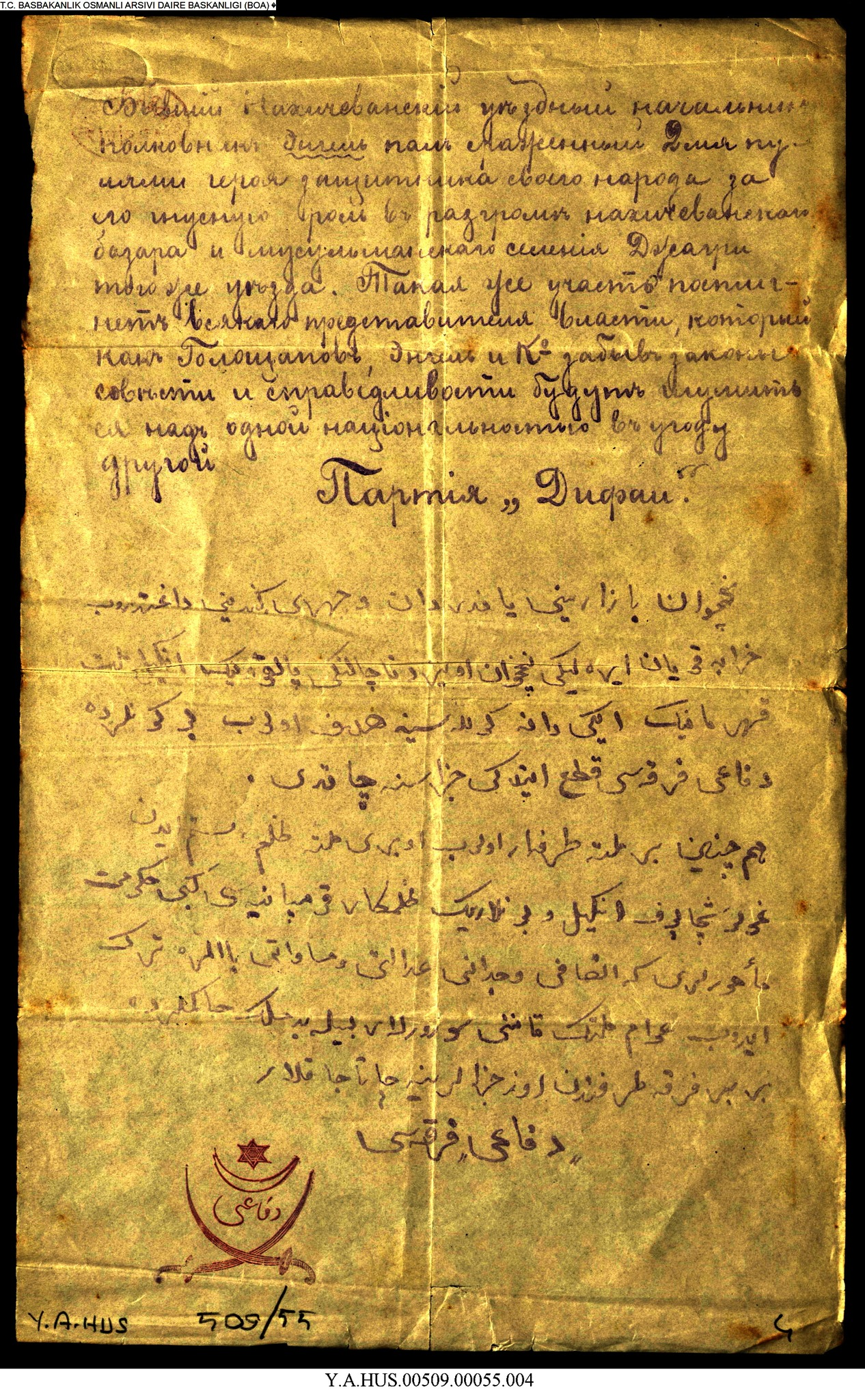
1906 Difai Ultimatum regarding the wounding of Colonel Enckelll

Enckell was promoted lieutenant colonel (podpolkovnik) with seniority from 26 February 1905. He left Nakhchivan on 22 December 1905 to become acting arbitrator (mirovoy posrednik) of the third section of the Echmiadzin Uyezd, and on 31 January 1907 was appointed district chief of the mountainous Lechkhumi district in the Kutais Governorate of western Georgia, a post he held until January 1915. He was promoted colonel (polkovnik) in 1908 for distinction, with seniority from 3 December 1908. (Note: Harjula refers to Enckell as a lieutenant colonel throughout 1914 and 1915, but the official seniority lists record him as a colonel from December 1908.)

== Investigation of the burial place of Maximus the Confessor ==
Soon after taking charge of the Lechkhumi district in 1907, Enckell took an interest in a local tradition identifying a spot near the village of Tsageri, below the Muri fortress on the Tskhenistsqali, as the burial place of Maximus the Confessor, who died in exile in Lazica in 662. On 1 September 1908 he wrote to the chancery of Bishop George (Aladashvili) of Imereti, and to the Governor of Kutais and the Georgian-Imeretian Synodal Office, arguing that the question deserved scholarly investigation.

The Synodal Office directed Bishop George to gather information; the material assembled, including a letter from the Georgian historian Tedo Zhordania, reached the Holy Synod in 1909 and was referred in 1912 to the Saint Petersburg Theological Academy, whose scholarly council reported in December 1913. That report became the basis of the study of Maximus's death and burial published by Professor Alexander Brilliantov in 1918. In March 1914 the Ober-Procurator of the Holy Synod applied to the Academy of Sciences, which allocated 500 roubles for the inquiry, and excavations near the Muri fortress began that summer under the direction of Nicholas Marr, who detached the archaeologists D. A. Kipshidze and D. E. Mikeladze together with N. N. Tikhonov of the Caucasus Museum and inspected the site in July 1914. A preliminary account was read to the historical-philological division of the Academy in February 1915, but the excavations gave no direct answer and the war brought the work to a halt.

Enckell also corresponded with Brilliantov directly. In a letter of 14 October 1913 he reported that although a village named Tskhumar existed in Upper Svaneti — a location proposed by some for the saint's death — no trace of any tradition about Maximus survived anywhere in that region, whereas around Muri his memory remained active. He described the annual gathering at the chapel on the Thursday of Easter week, a rite in which villagers processed barefoot to the grave to pray for an end to prolonged rain, and a local legend that the saint had been killed by a peasant of Dekhviri and buried three times before his body would rest. The letter survives among Brilliantov's papers in the National Library of Russia.

== First World War ==
Enckell remained in the civil administration through the first months of the war; the seniority list of colonels corrected to 1 March 1914 still records him as district chief of Lechkhumi, and he held the post until 4 January 1915. On that date he was transferred to the 77th Tenginsky Infantry Regiment of the 20th Infantry Division, then stationed at Akhaltsikhe in the Caucasus Military District. (Note: Harjula places Enckell's return to the active army at the outbreak of the war in 1914; the service record dates the transfer to 4 January 1915.) He was one of a small number of officers of Finnish background serving in the Caucasus at that time.

During 1915 the Caucasus front was obliged to release units to the Polish front, and Enckell was transferred there with his regiment. He received swords and a bow to his Order of Saint Vladimir, 4th class, by imperial order of 24 September 1915, and was still serving with the Tenginsky regiment in the same rank when the seniority list was corrected to 1 August 1916, without a separate command appointment. On 5 July 1917 he was transferred to the reserve of ranks attached to the staff of the Petrograd Military District.

== Later life and death ==
Enckell was among the very small number of senior officers of the imperial army who joined the Bolsheviks. In his study of the Russian officer corps, the historian Sergey Volkov observes that officers who belonged to the Bolshevik party by the end of 1917 were almost exclusively junior ranks, and lists Enckell among the handful of field officers in that group; such officers typically headed soldiers' committees and led Bolshevik formations during and immediately after the October Revolution. He subsequently served in the Red Army, and until 1 June 1920 headed the training section of the Astrakhan infantry command courses. He died of typhoid fever on 28 April 1921 in the Volga town of Volsk, in Saratov Governorate. His relatives in Finland had had no word of him since the war and feared he had shared the violent death suffered by many officers in Russia; news of his prolonged illness and death reached them only after his widow succeeded in returning to Finland.

== Awards ==
- Order of Saint Vladimir, 4th class (1903); swords and bow added by imperial order of 24 September 1915
- Order of Saint Stanislaus, 2nd class (1907)
- Order of Saint Anna, 2nd class (1909)
- Order of Saint Vladimir, 3rd class with swords (imperial order of 6 May 1916)

== Sources ==
- Harjula, Mirko (2013). Ryssänupseerit: ensimmäisen maailmansodan ja Venäjän sisällissodan suomalaistaustaiset upseerit 1914–1956 (in Finnish).
- Список полковникам по старшинству, составлен по 1-е марта 1914 г. [List of colonels by seniority, compiled to 1 March 1914] (in Russian). St Petersburg. 1914.
- Список полковникам по старшинству, исправлен по 1-е августа 1916 г. [List of colonels by seniority, corrected to 1 August 1916] (in Russian). Petrograd. 1916.
- "Русскій Инвалидъ". Russky Invalid (in Russian). No. 219. 1915.
- «Kuolleita» // Uusi Suomi. — № 156, 12 July 1921. — S. 4.
- Volkov, Sergey (1993). Трагедия русского офицерства [The tragedy of the Russian officer corps] (in Russian). Moscow.
- Brilliantov, Alexander I. (1918). "О месте кончины и погребения св. Максима Исповедника" [On the place of death and burial of St Maximus the Confessor] (PDF). Христианский Восток (in Russian). St Petersburg.
