= Alfred William Finch =

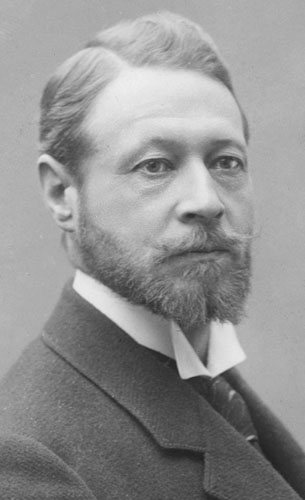
- Finch c. 1900
- Born: 1854
- Died: 1930 (aged 75–76)
- Known for: Painting
- Movement: Pointillism

Alfred William (Willy) Finch (1854 –1930) was a ceramist and painter in the pointillist and Neo-Impressionist style. Born in Brussels to British parents, he spent most of his creative life in Finland.

== Life and work ==
Alfred William Finch was born on 28 November 1854 in Brussels, Belgium to British parents, Joseph Finch (a businessman) and Emma Finch (née Holach). He spent his youth in Ostend. When he was twenty-four he began studying for one year in Brussels at the Académie Royale des Beaux-Arts.

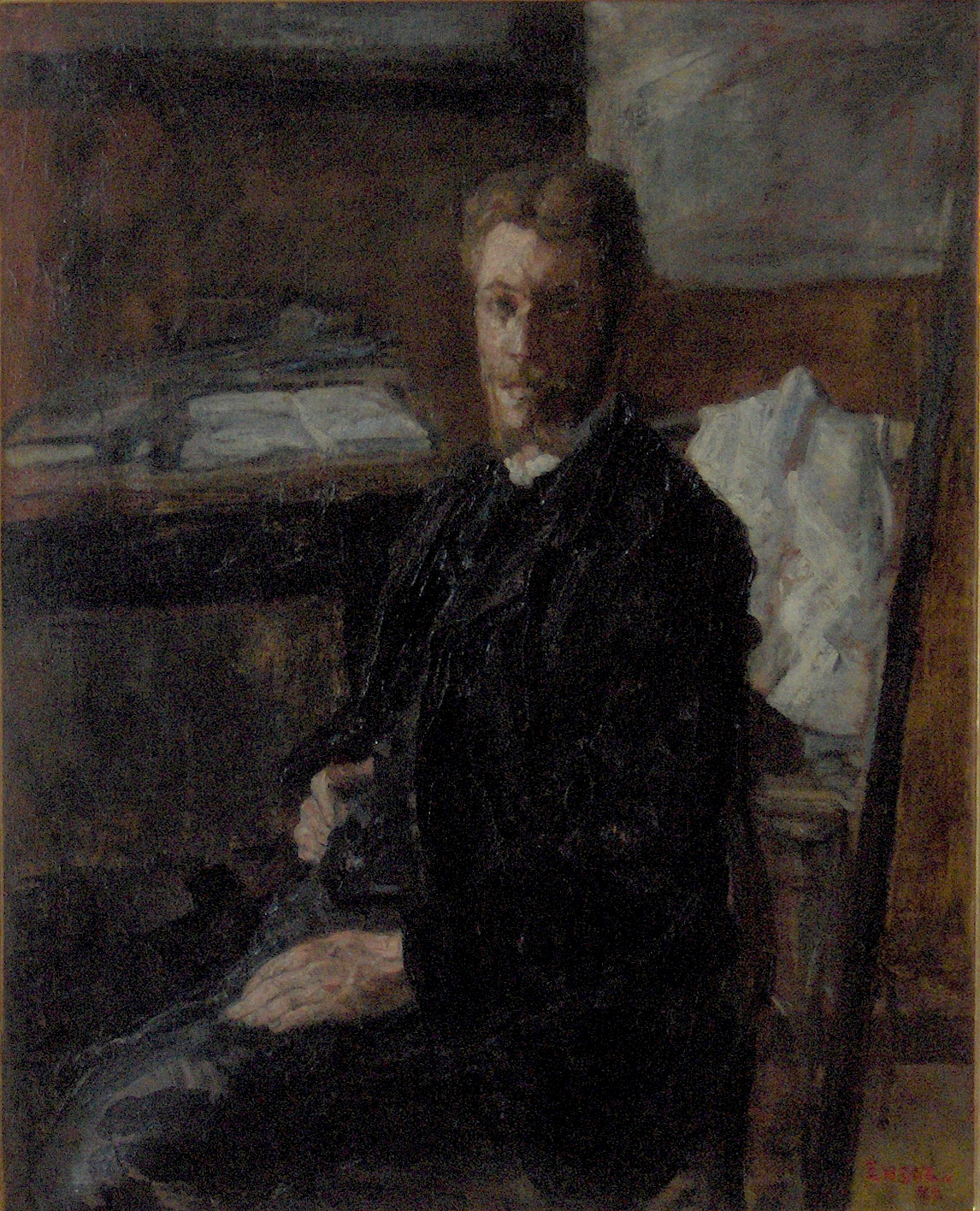
Portrait by James Ensor in 1882

On 28 October 1883 he became a founding member of Les XX, a group of twenty Belgian painters, designers and sculptors, who rebelled against the prevailing artistic standards and outmoded academism. He was impressed by the works of Georges Seurat and Paul Signac and changed his own painting style from a more realistic approach into a pointillistic style. In the following years, Finch became one of the leading representatives of his style in Belgium, along with Théo van Rysselberghe.

During the early 1890s Finch switched careers from painting to pottery, upon the realization that he couldn't make a living by painting.

In 1897, invited by count Louis Sparre, Finch moved to Porvoo, Finland, to head the Iris ceramics factory, and influenced the development of the local Jugendstil. After the factory was closed, Finch resumed his painting career in Finland.

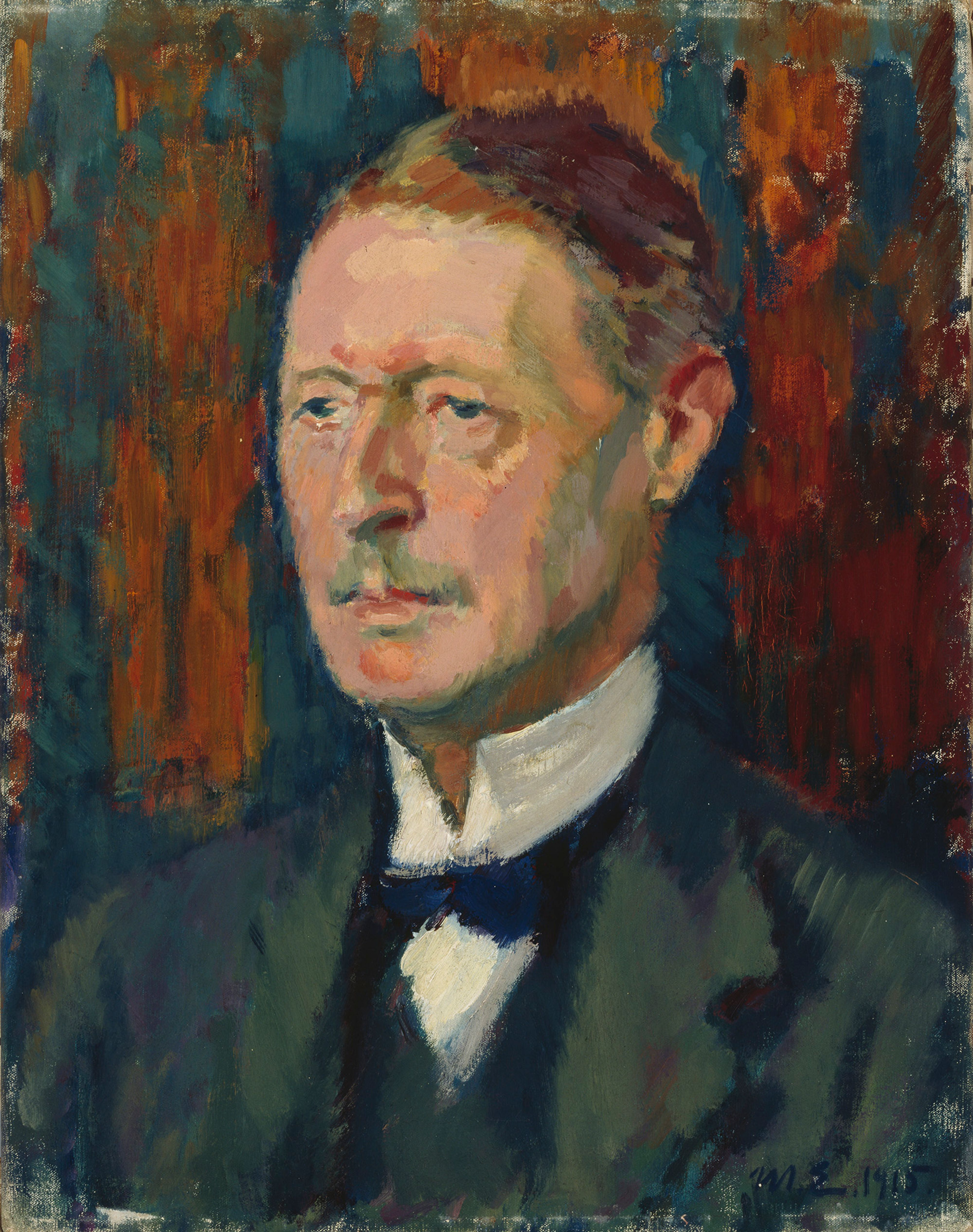
Finch by Magnus Enckell, 1915

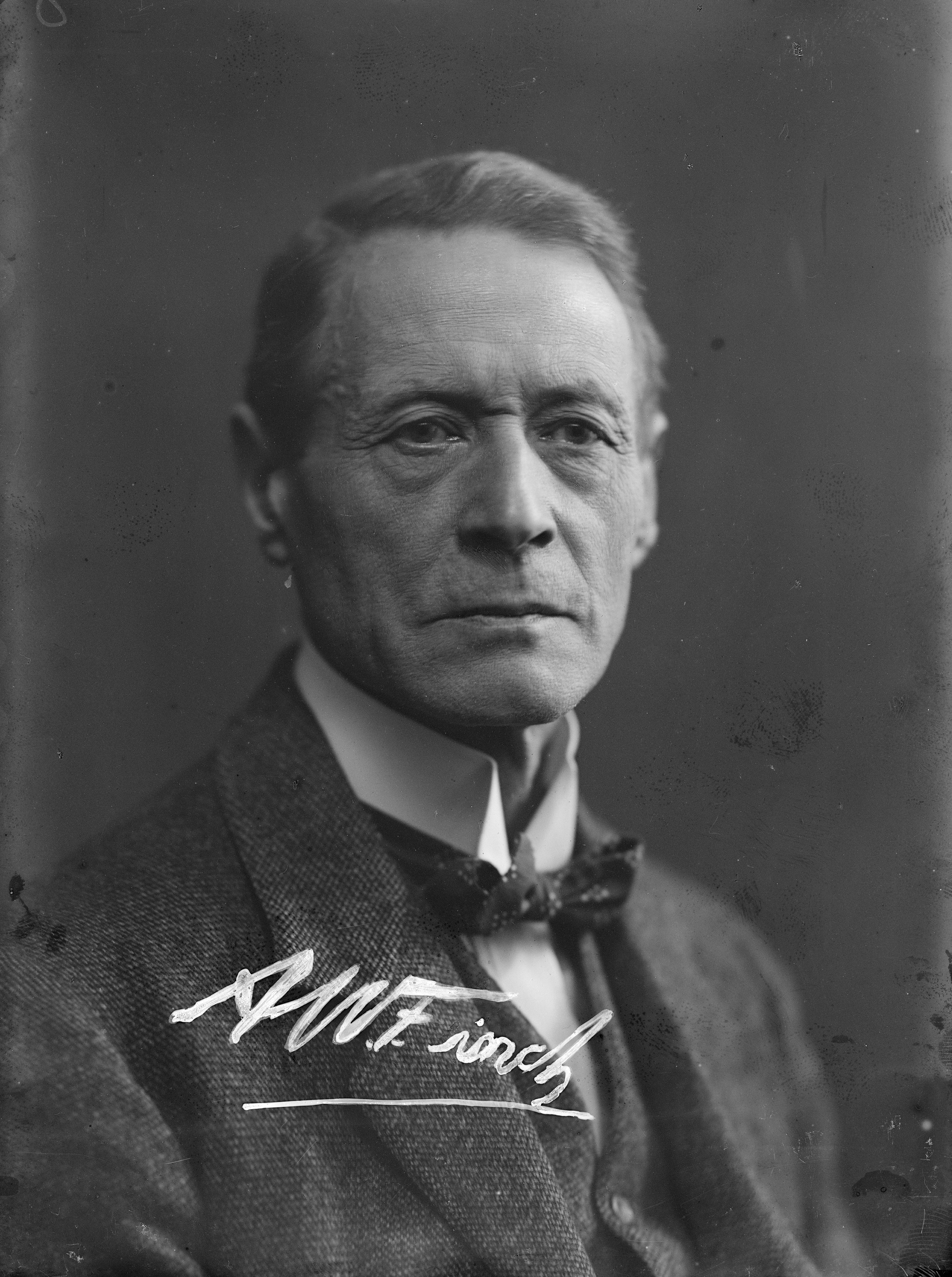
Finch in the 1920s

Finch died in Helsinki on 28 April 1930.

== Works ==
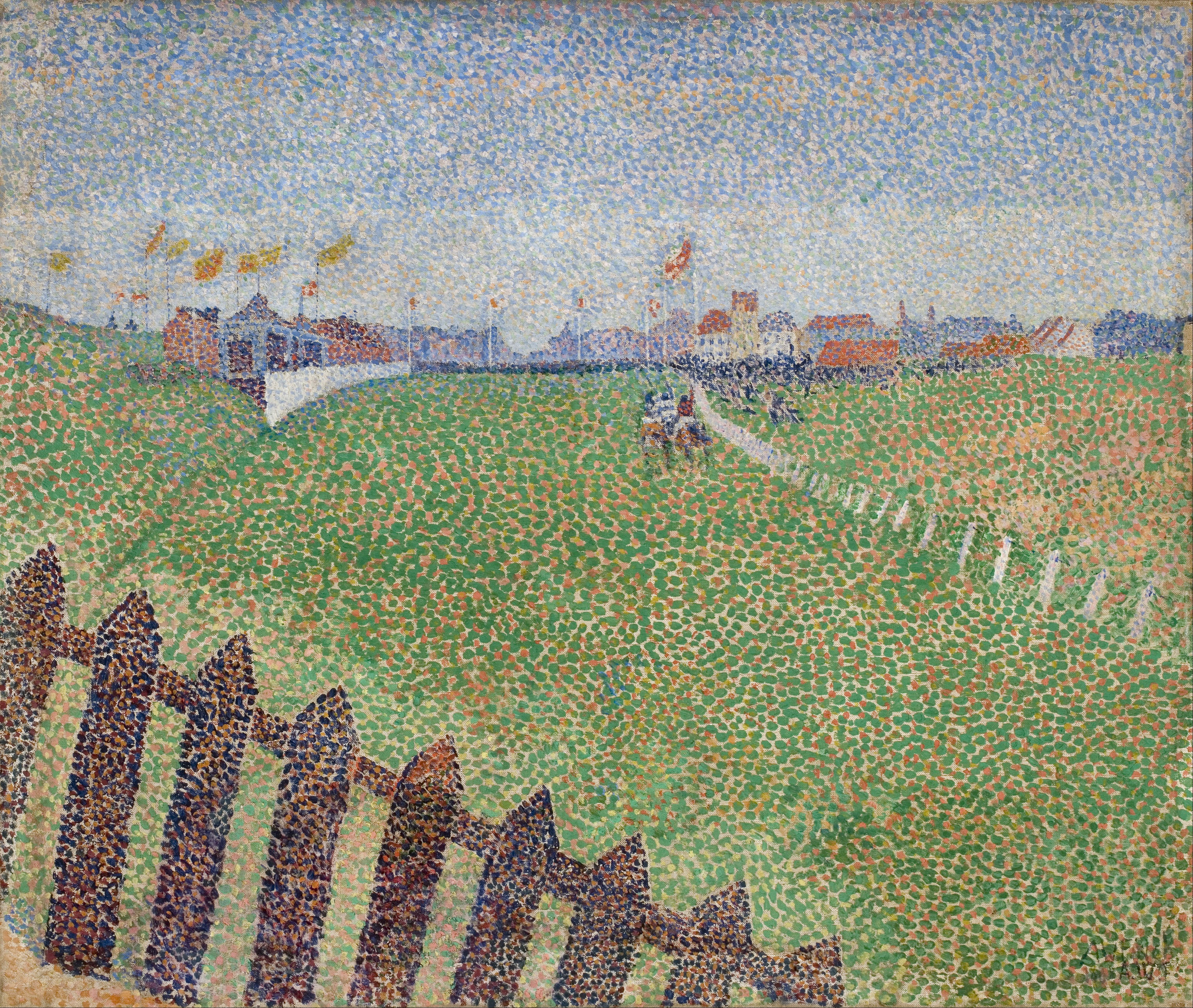
The Wellington Racecourse in Drizzle (Ostende), 1888

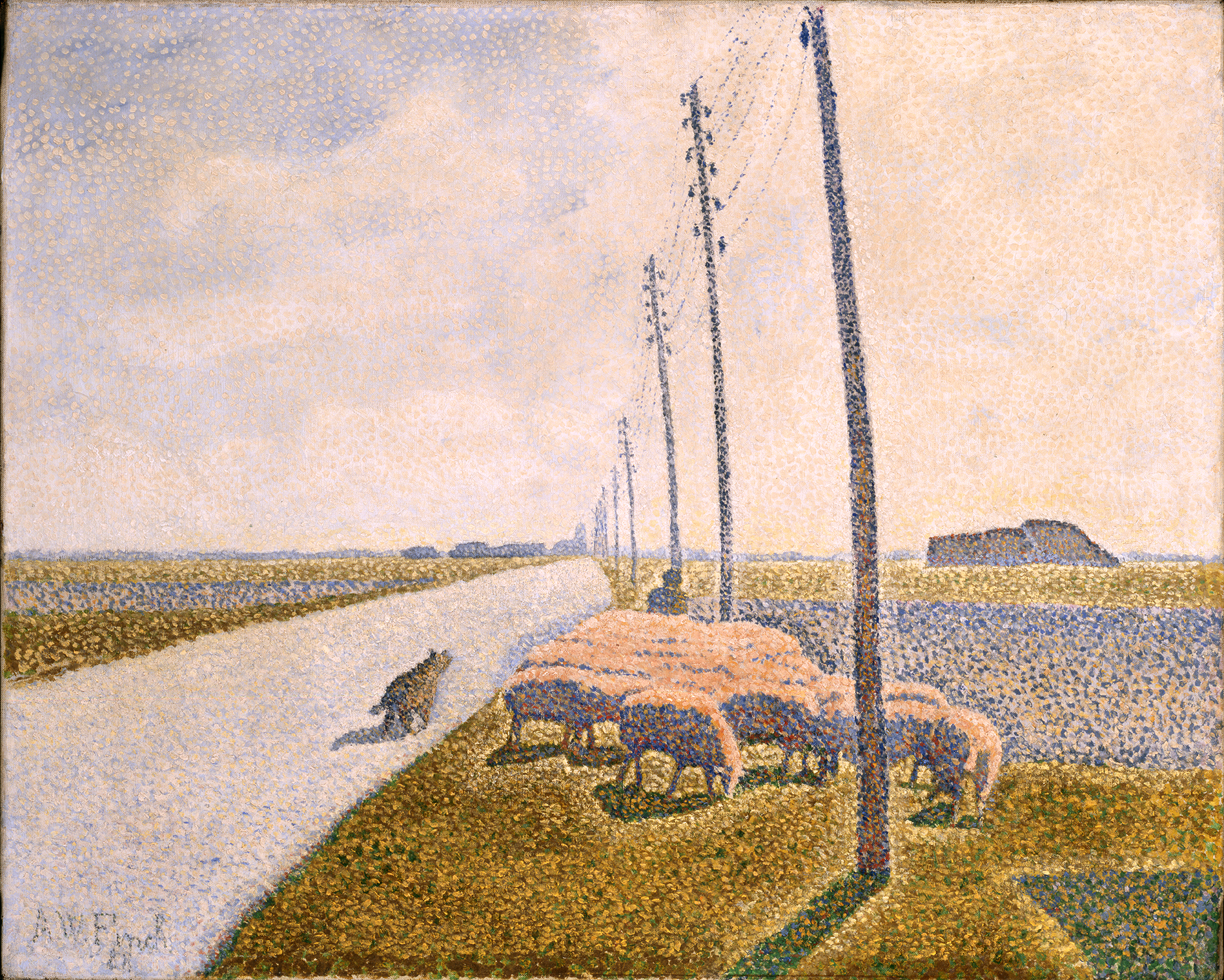
The Road to Nieuport, 1888

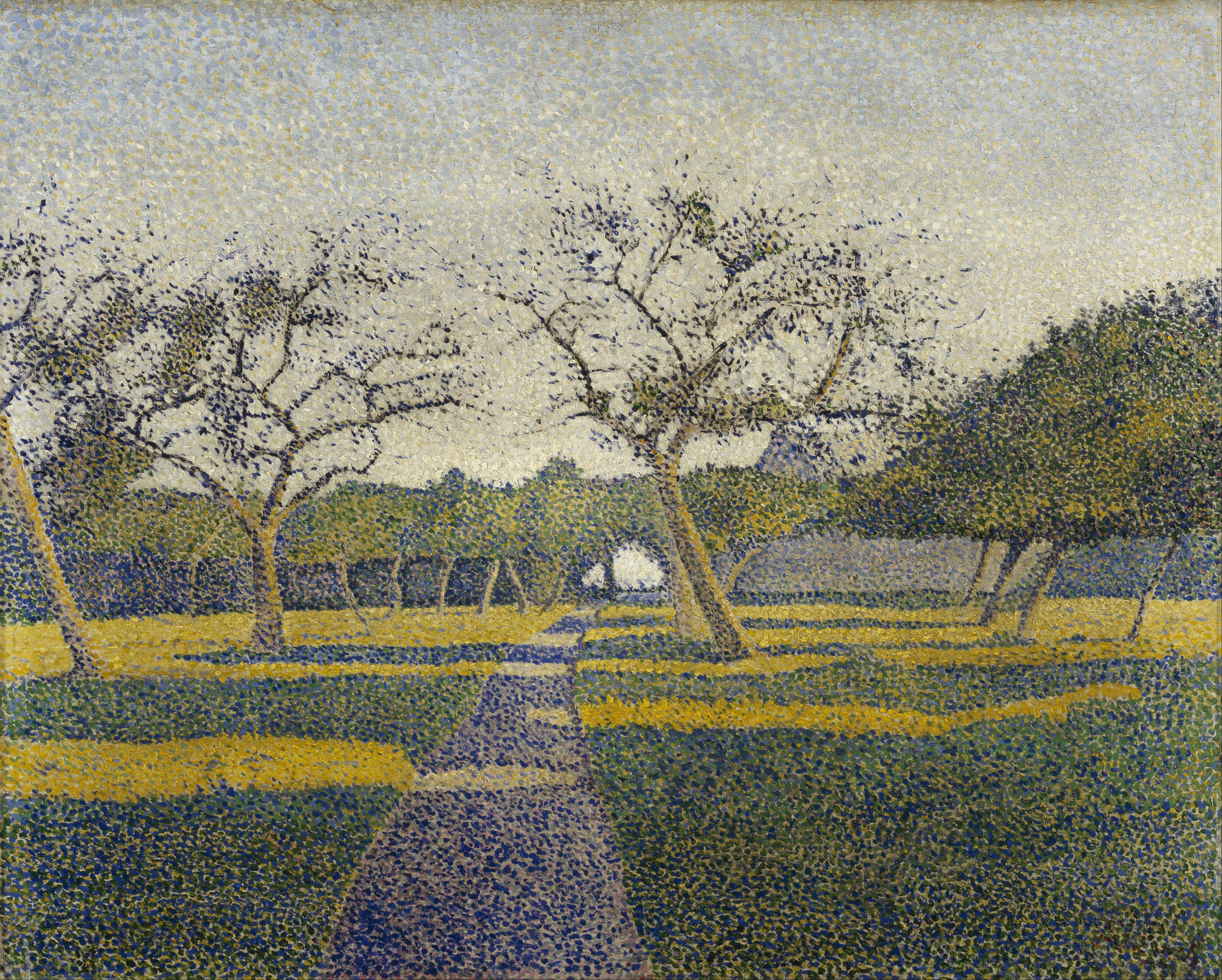
Orchard at La Louvière, 1890

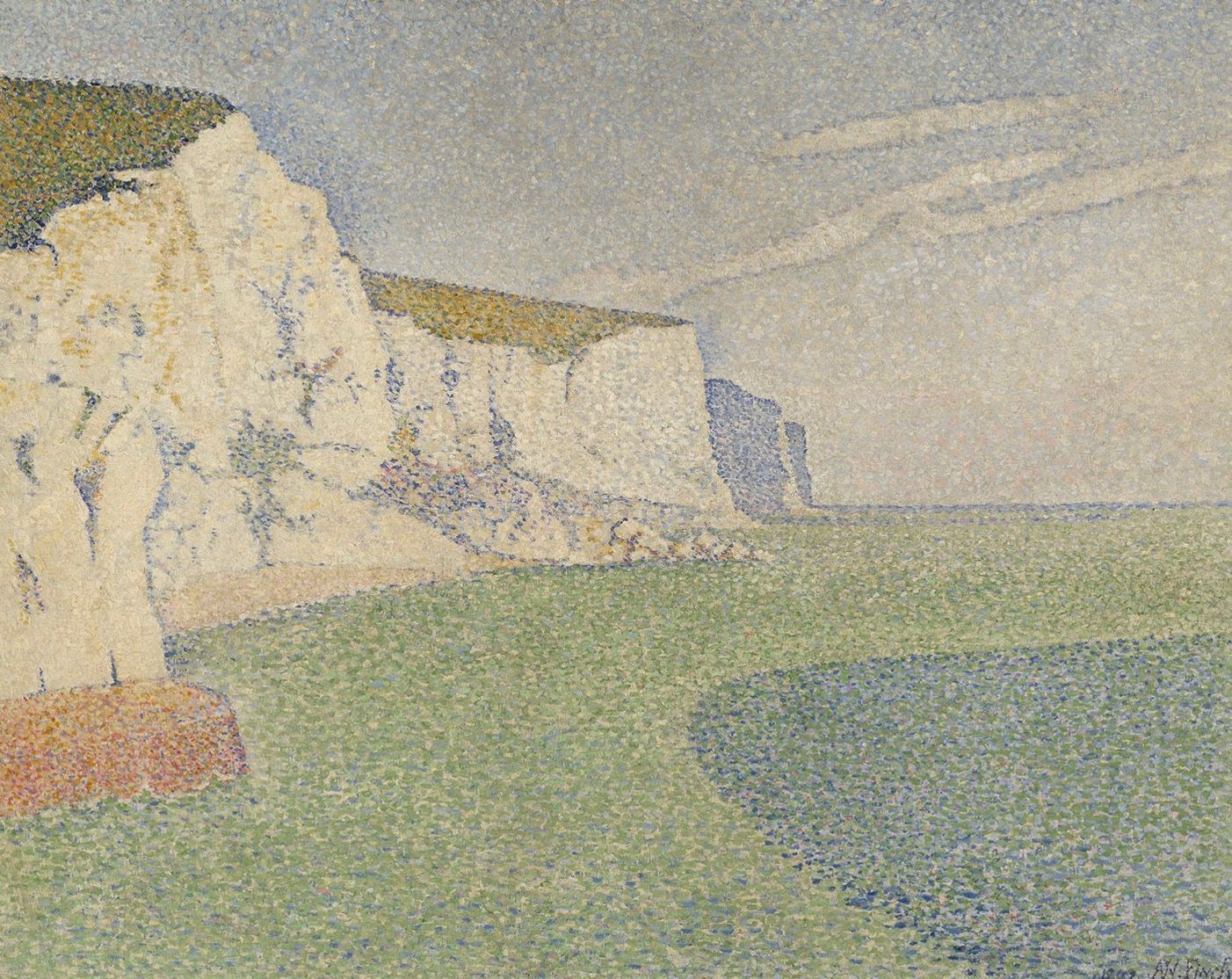
The Cliffs of Dover, 1892

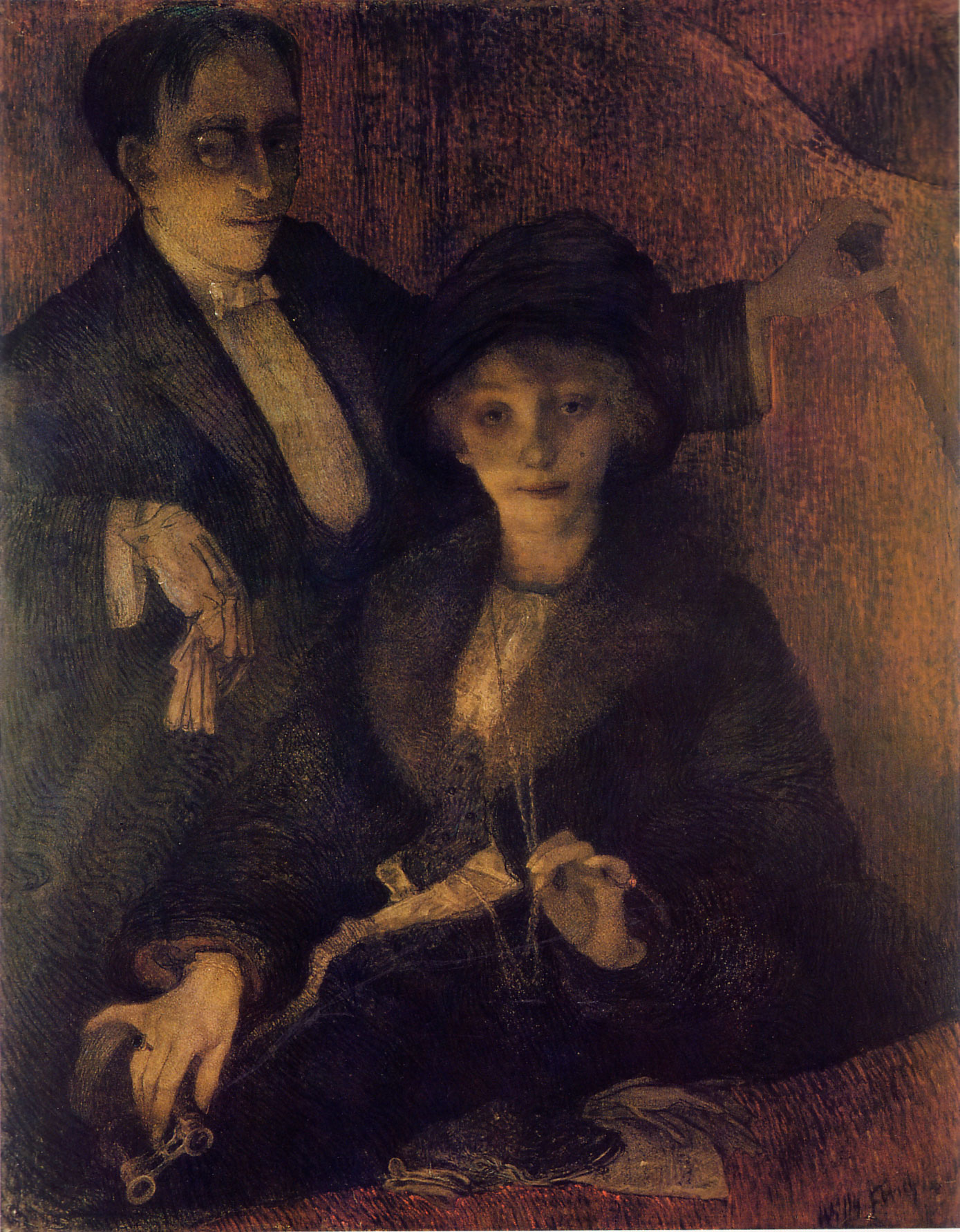
Box at the Theatre, 1896

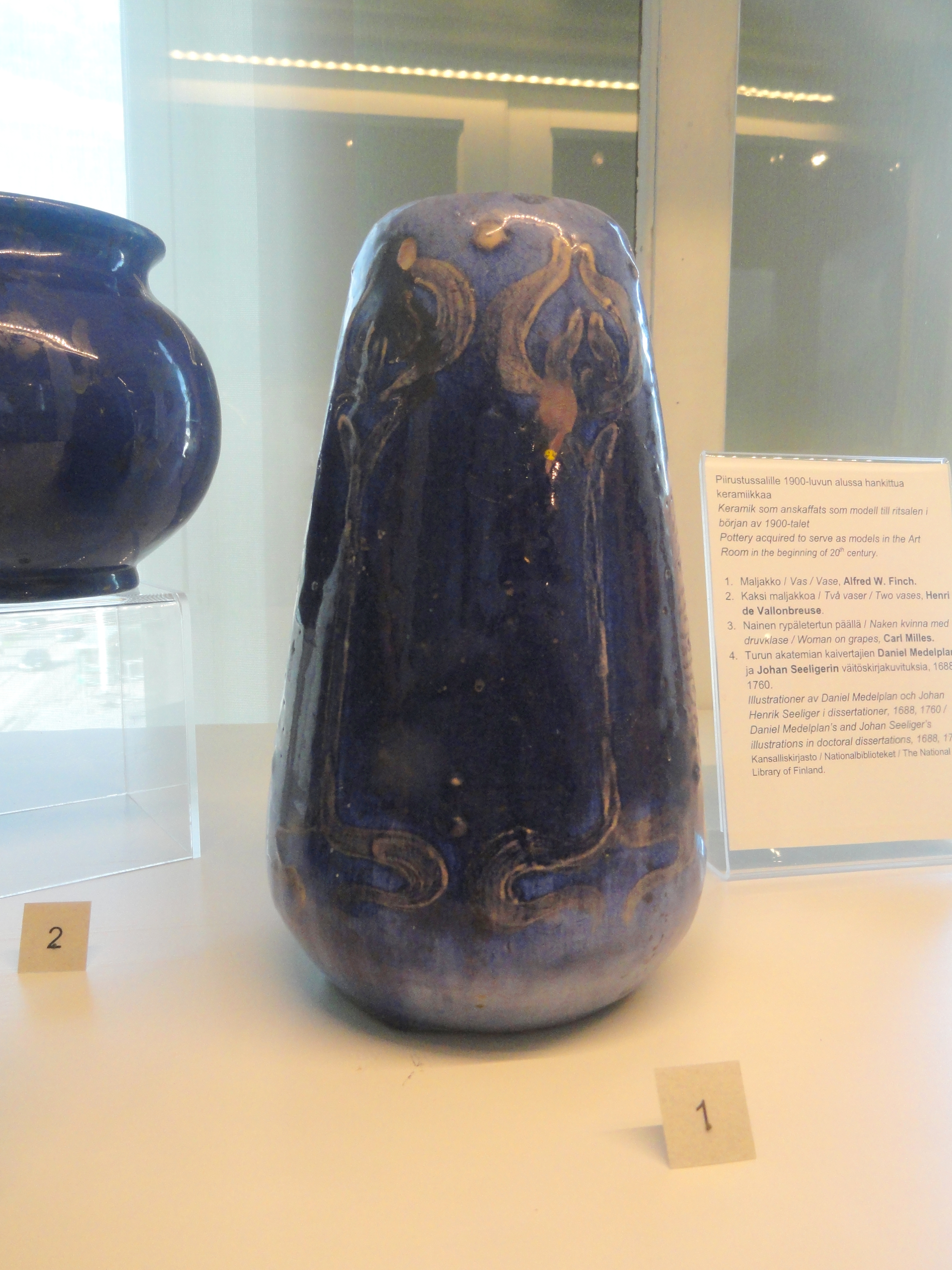
Vase by Finch, early 1900s

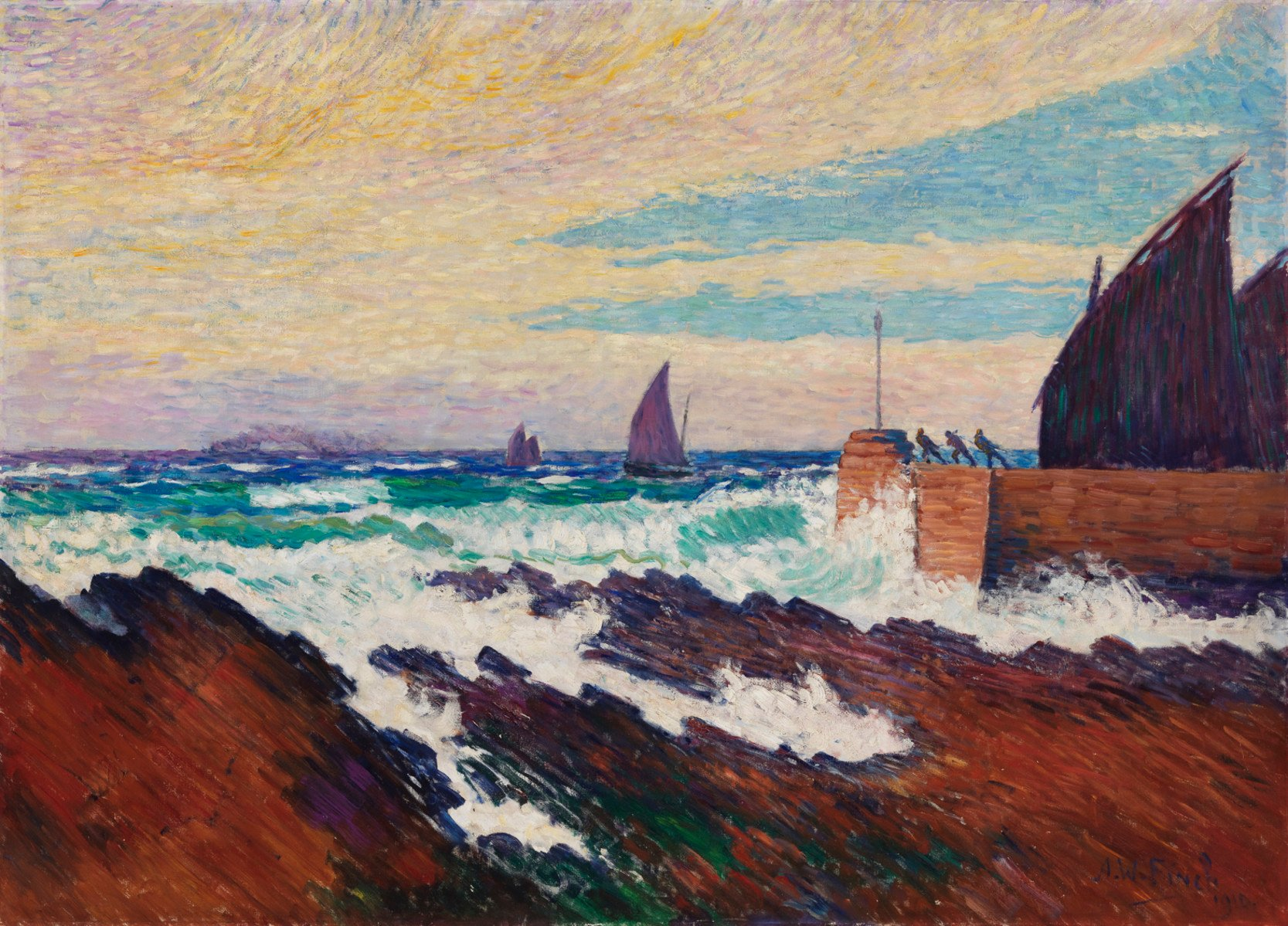
Rosehearty Pier, 1910

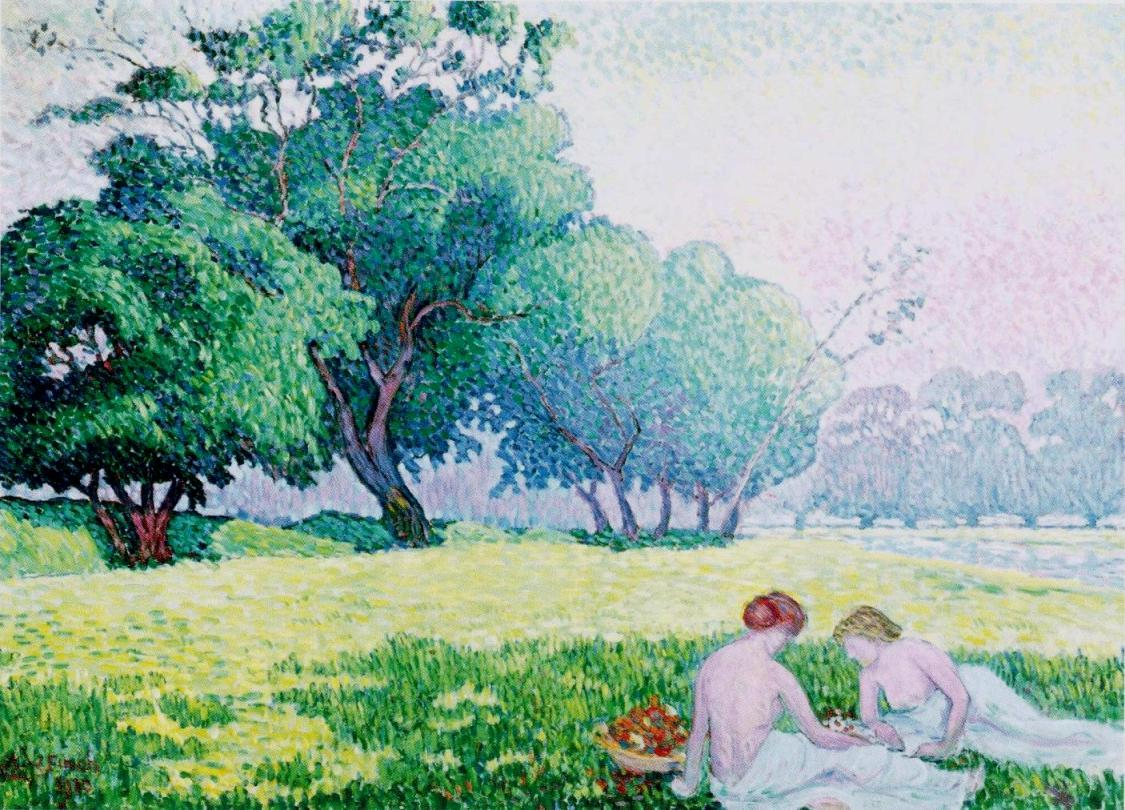
Scene from a Park, 1910

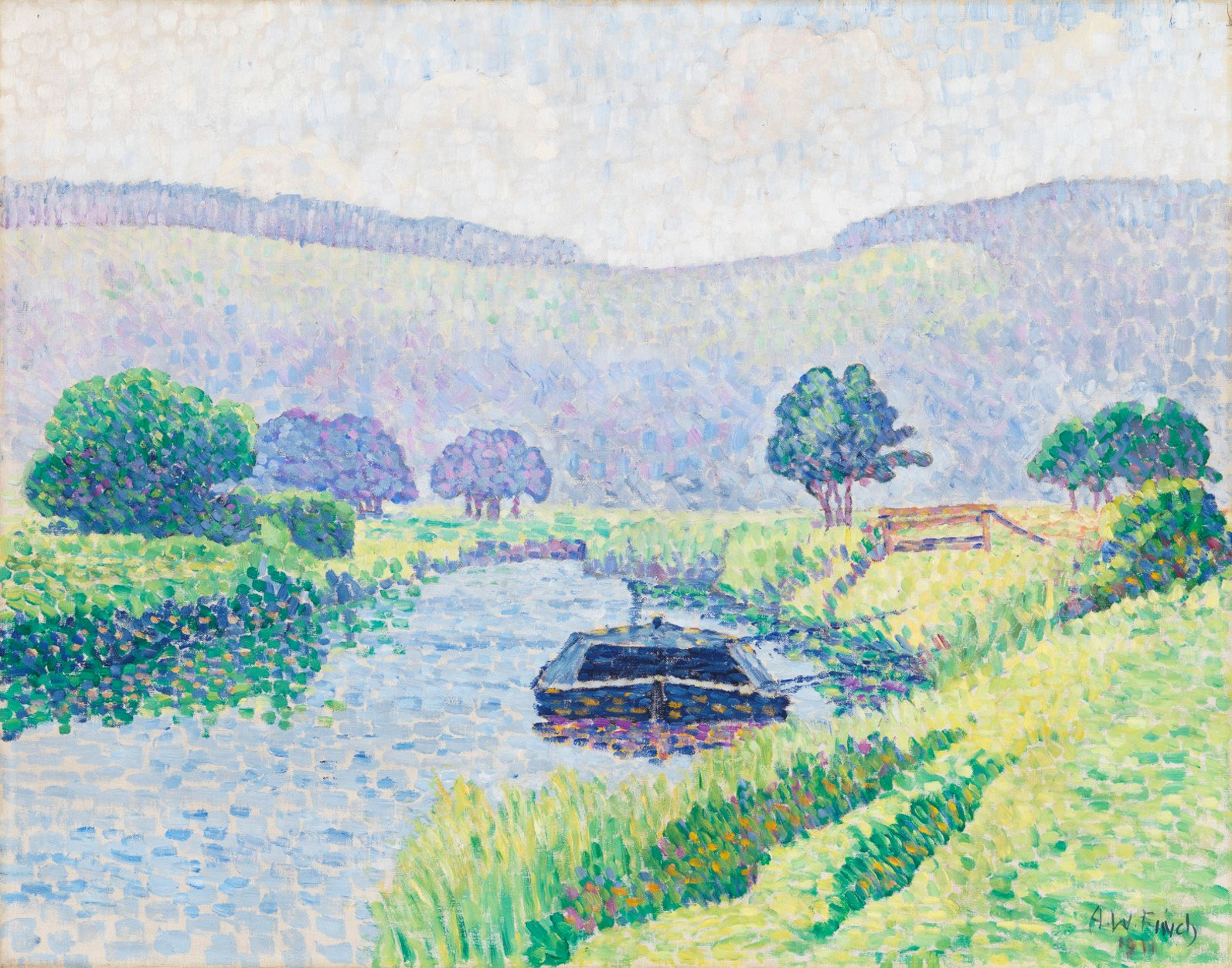
Amberley River Valley, 1911

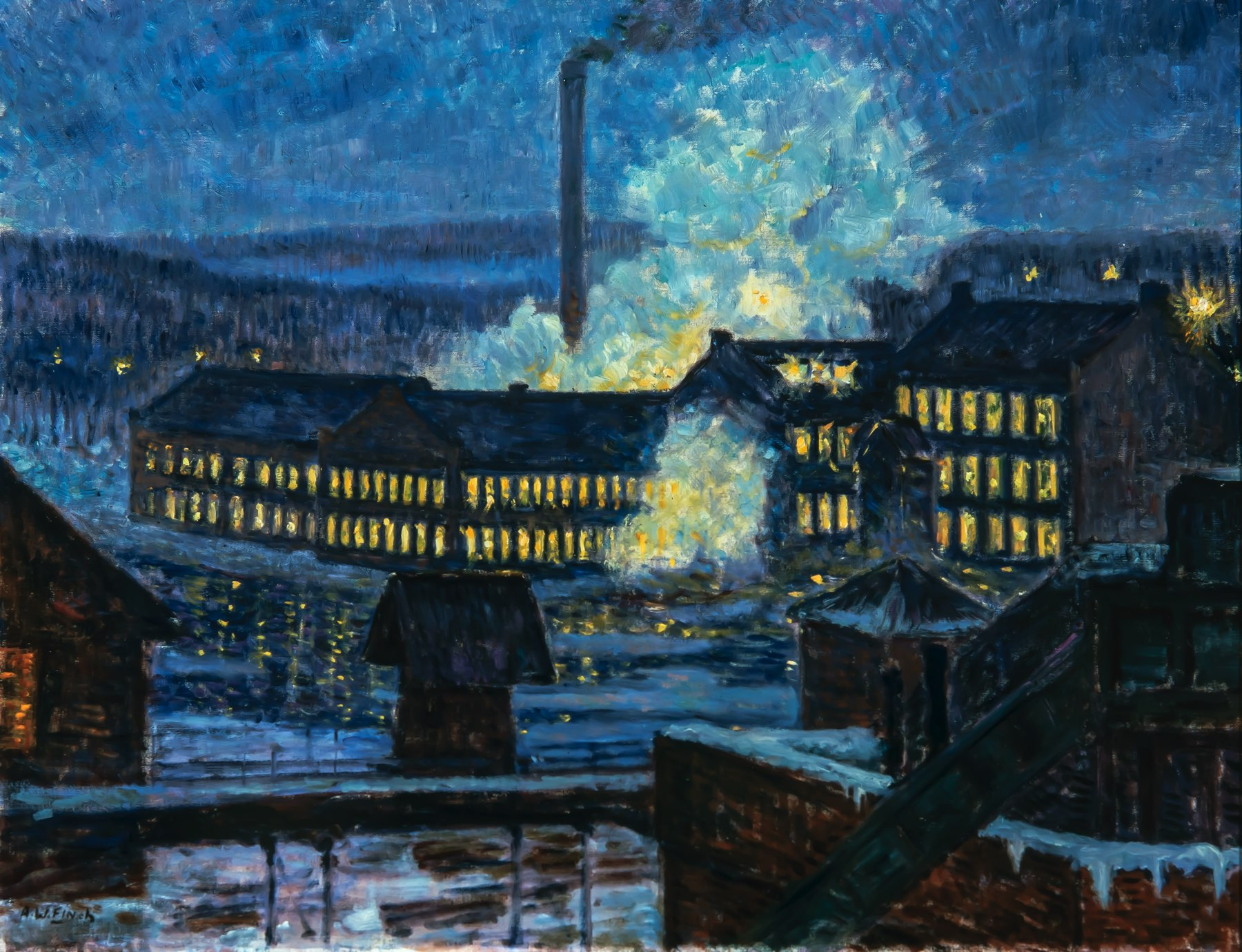
Night View of a Factory, 1910s

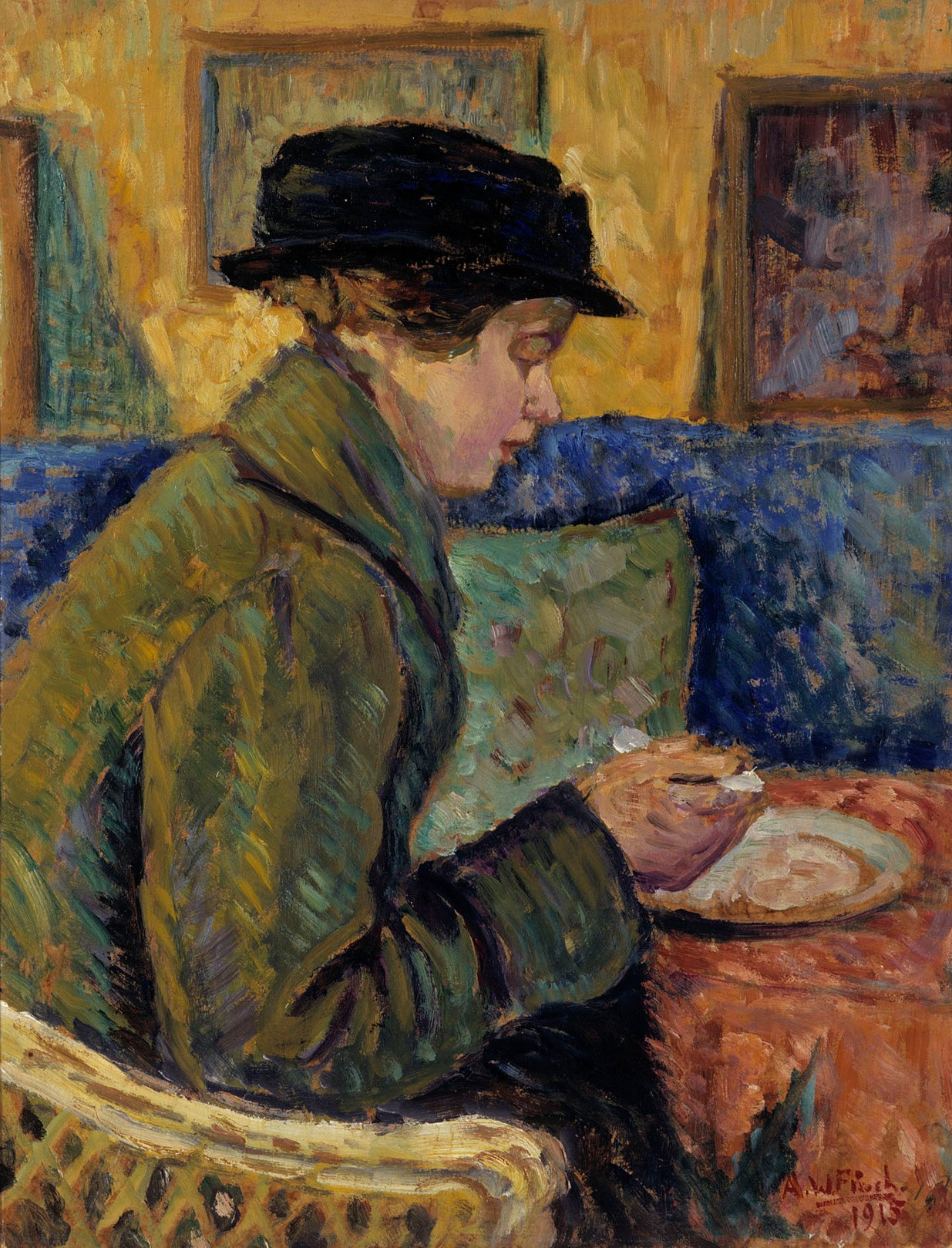
Woman in Profile, 1915

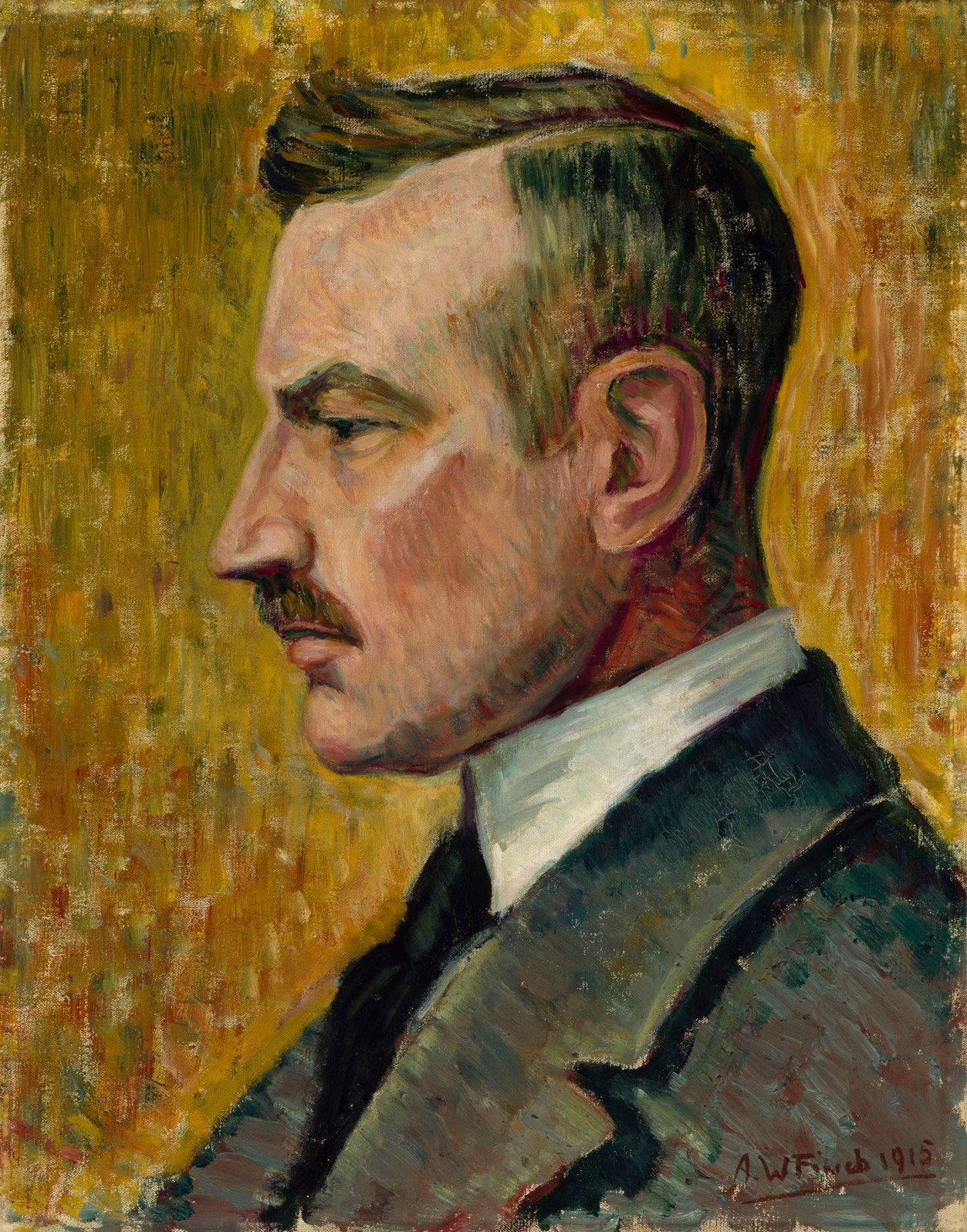
Portrait of Magnus Enckell, 1915

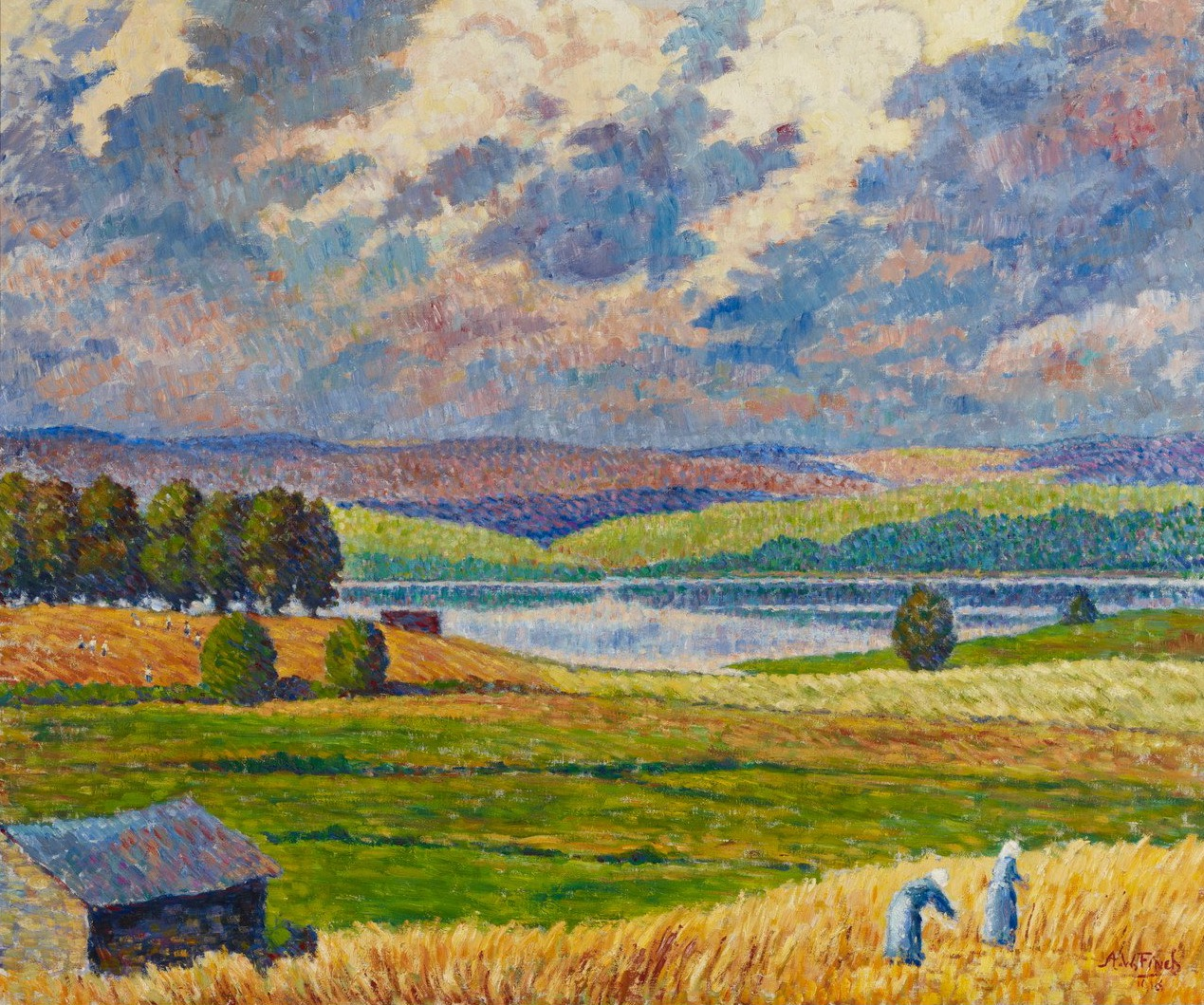
Landscape from Padasjoki, 1918

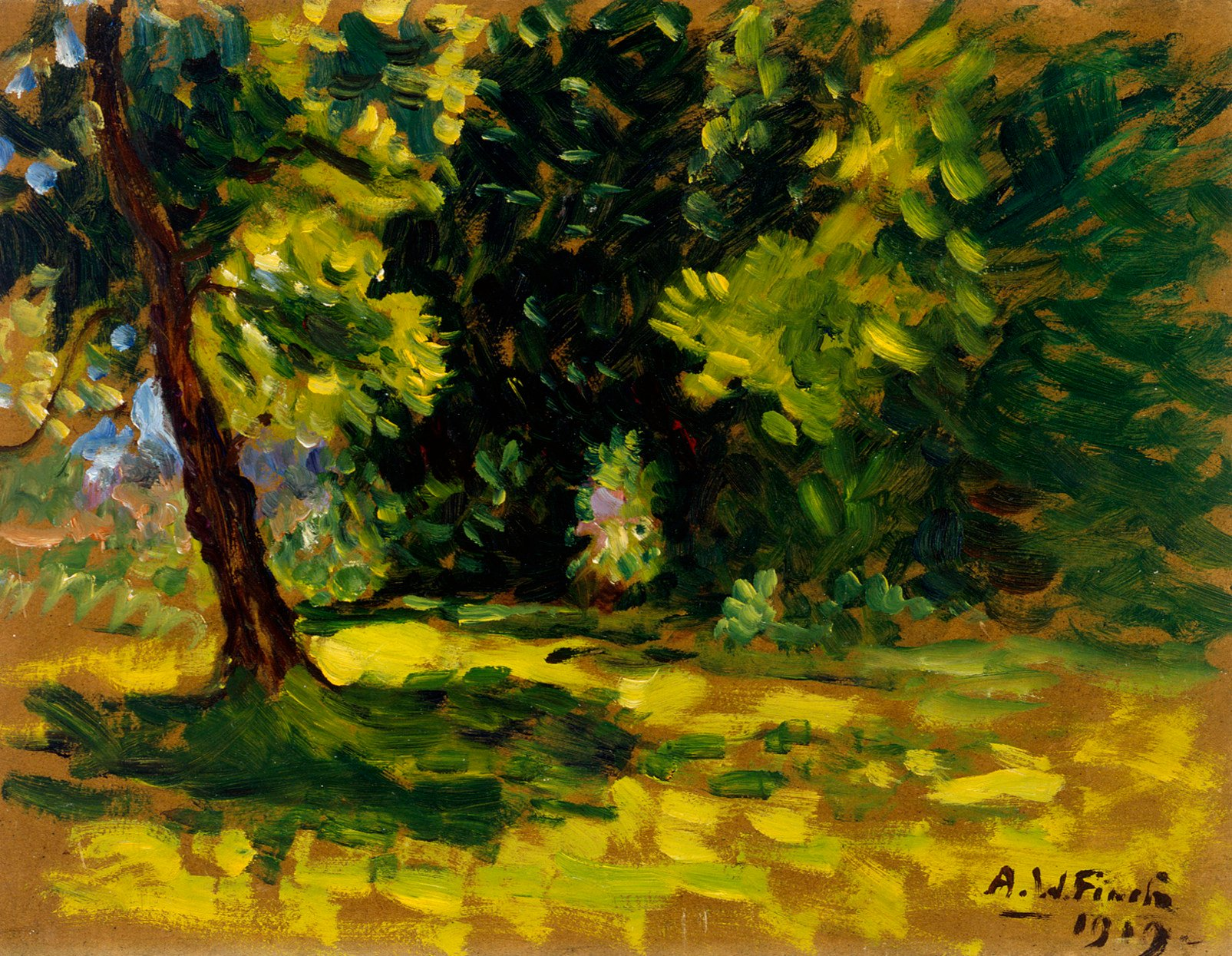
Bushes, 1919
