= Magnus Enckell =

Finnish symbolist painter (1870–1925)

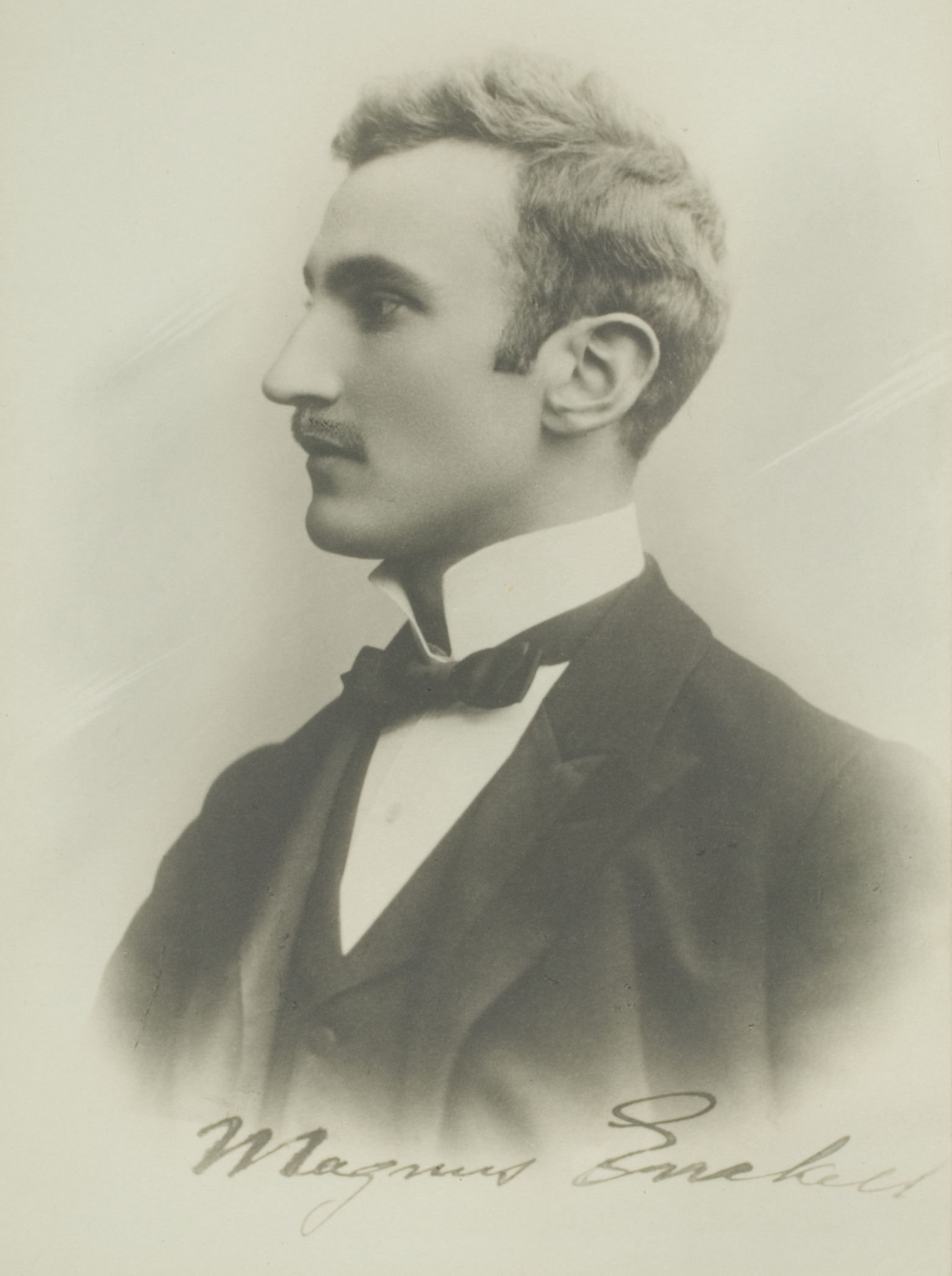
- Enckell in 1888–1891
- Born: Knut Magnus Enckell; 9 November 1870; Hamina, Grand Duchy of Finland, Russian Empire (now Finland)
- Died: 27 November 1925 (aged 55); Stockholm, Sweden
- Known for: Painting
- Movement: Symbolism

Knut Magnus Enckell (9 November 1870 – 27 November 1925) was a Finnish symbolist painter. At first, he painted with a subdued palette, but from 1902 onwards, used increasingly bright colors. He was a leading member of the Septem group of colorist painters. In Finland, Enckell is considered to have been a very influential symbolist artist.

== Biography ==
Knut Magnus Enckell was born on 9 November 1870 in Hamina, a small town in southeastern Finland, the son of Carl Enckell, a priest, and Alexandra Enckell (born Appelberg). The Enckell family originates from Germany, from where Christoffer Enckell had moved to Southwest Finland in the 17th century. He had an elder brother Axel Enckell, in addition to four more brothers. His native language was Finland’s Swedish.

In 1889, at the age of 19, he began his artistic studies in Helsinki, at the drawing school of the Finnish Art Society, but he dropped out and continued his studies privately under Gunnar Berndtson. Naturalism was the established style during his education in Helsinki 1889–1891.

In 1891, he went to Paris for the first time, where he became a student of Jules-Joseph Lefebvre and Jean-Joseph Benjamin-Constant at the Académie Julian. There he was drawn to the Symbolist movement, and was influenced by the painter Pierre Puvis de Chavannes as well as Symbolist literature.

During a stay in Brittany he made two paintings in spare colors: Self-Portrait and Breton Woman. He was enthusiastic about the Renaissance and about the idealistic and mystical ideas of Sâr Péladan.

During his second stay in Paris in 1893, he painted The Awakening, in which he used a rigorous composition and transparent colors to suggest a spiritual atmosphere; and, through contact with the Swedish artists, Olof Sager-Nelson and Ivan Aguéli, he deepened his interest in mysticism.

It is generally believed that Enckell was a homosexual. Some of his erotic portraits, which were quite uninhibited for their time, suggest as much, although his homosexuality has never been conclusively proven. As Routledge's Who's Who in Gay and Lesbian History puts it, "His love affairs with men have not been denied. [...] Enckell's naked men and boys are openly erotic and sensual." In his own time, the sensuality of his paintings was explained away as something caused by his Swedish-speaking background.

In 1894 and 1895 Enckell traveled to Milan, Florence, Ravenna, Siena and Venice, where his inner conflicts were reflected in his art. In 1898 he taught himself fresco and tempera techniques in Florence, by studying the work of Masaccio and Fra Angelico.

The years in Italy gave his work a greater range of colors and a more optimistic foundation. In the first years of the twentieth century, under the influence of Post Impressionism, he developed a brighter, more colorful palette. An example of this is the series, The Bathers, in dark, lively colors. Together with Verner Thomé and Ellen Thesleff, Enckell founded the group Septem, in which artists who shared his beliefs came together.

1907 Enckell executed the commission for the altarpiece of Tampere Cathedral. The fresco, more than 10 meters wide and 4 meters high, shows, in subdued colors, the resurrection of people of all races. In the middle of the painting two men walk hand in hand.

From 1901 onwards Enckell spent many summers on the island of Suursaari, where he painted his "Boys on the Beach" (1910). He organised exhibitions of Finnish art in Berlin (1903) and Paris (1908), and of French and Belgian art in Helsinki (1904). He chaired the Artists' Association of Finland from 1915 to 1918, and was elected a member of the Fine Art Academy of Finland in 1922.

In 1920, Enckell bought Villa Eka in Espoo, Finland from Ellan de la Chapelle, the wife of Albert Edelfelt.

In 1925, at the age of 55, Enckell died of pneumonia in Stockholm, Sweden, where he was hosting his own exhibition. His funeral was a national event. He was buried in his native town in Finland.

== Works ==
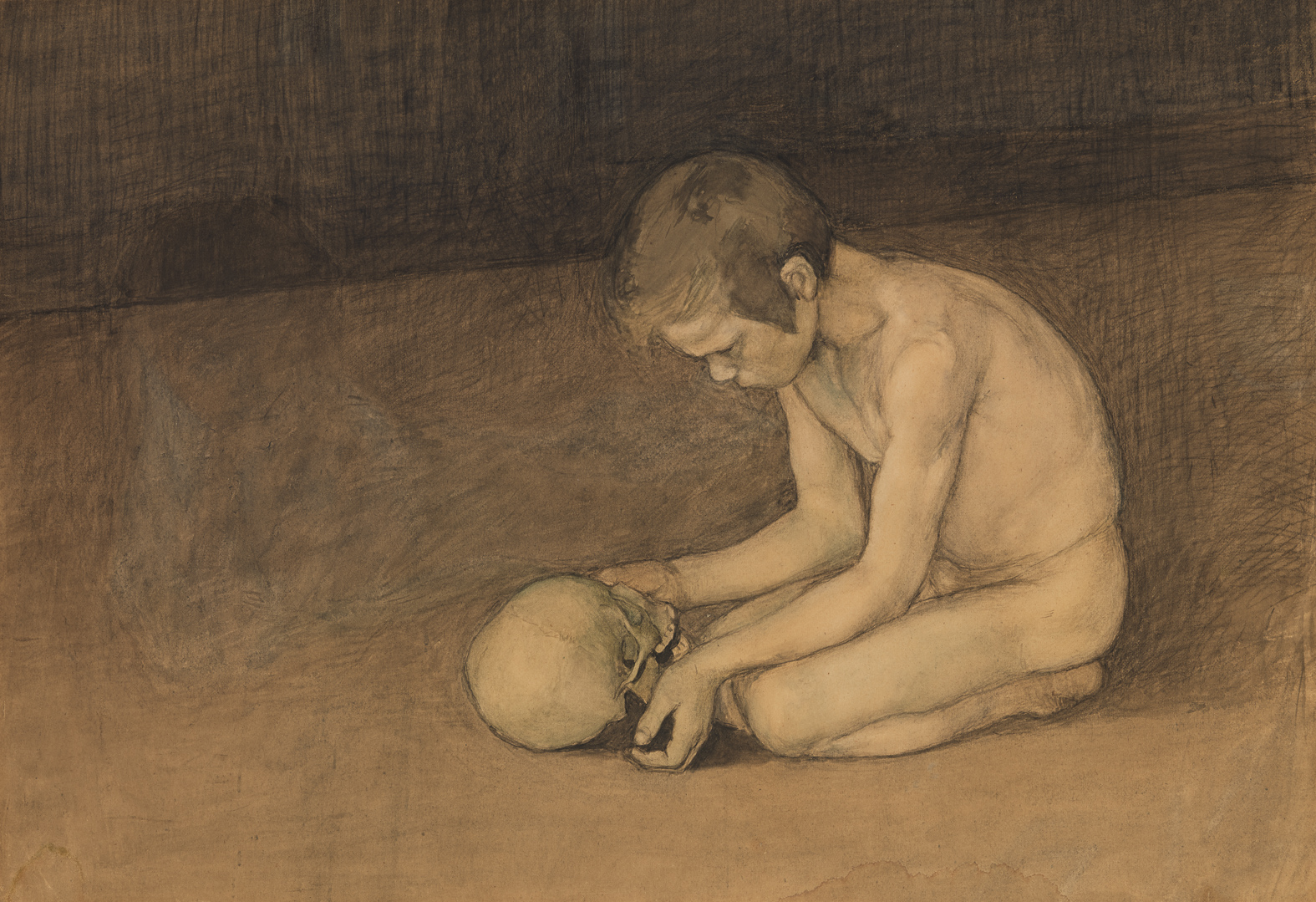
Boy with Skull, 1893

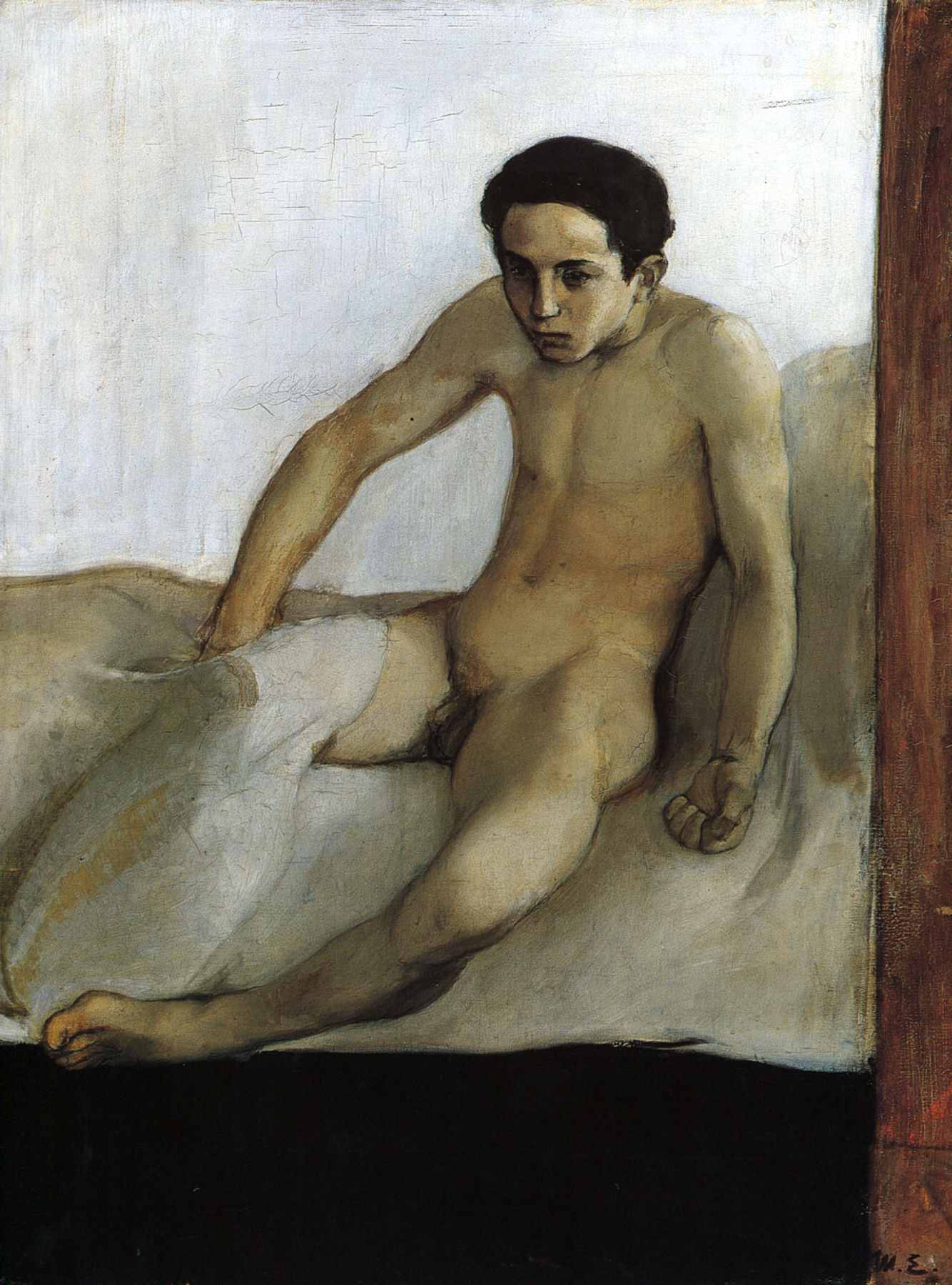
The Awakening, 1894

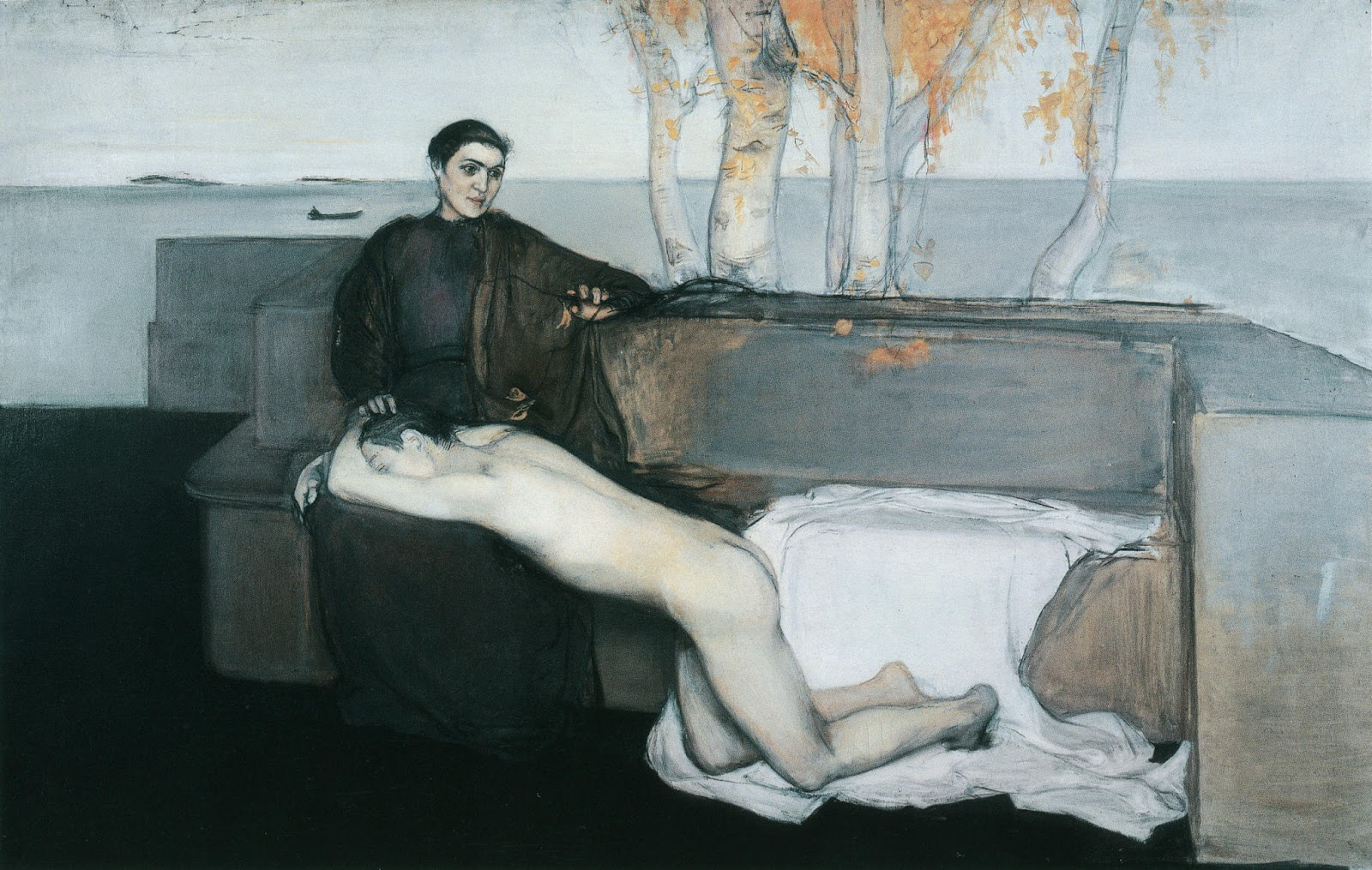
Melancholy, 1895

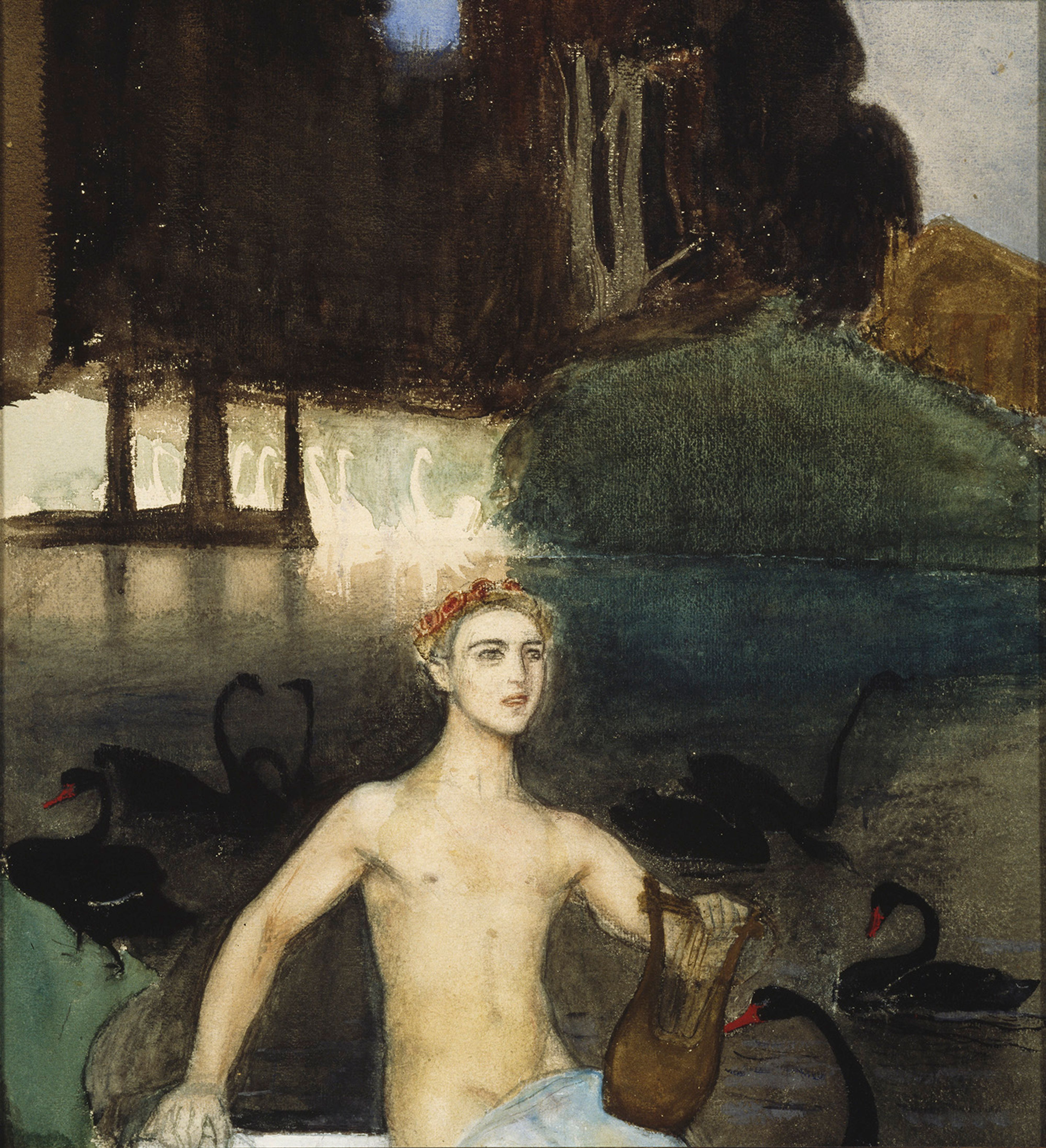
Fantasy, 1895

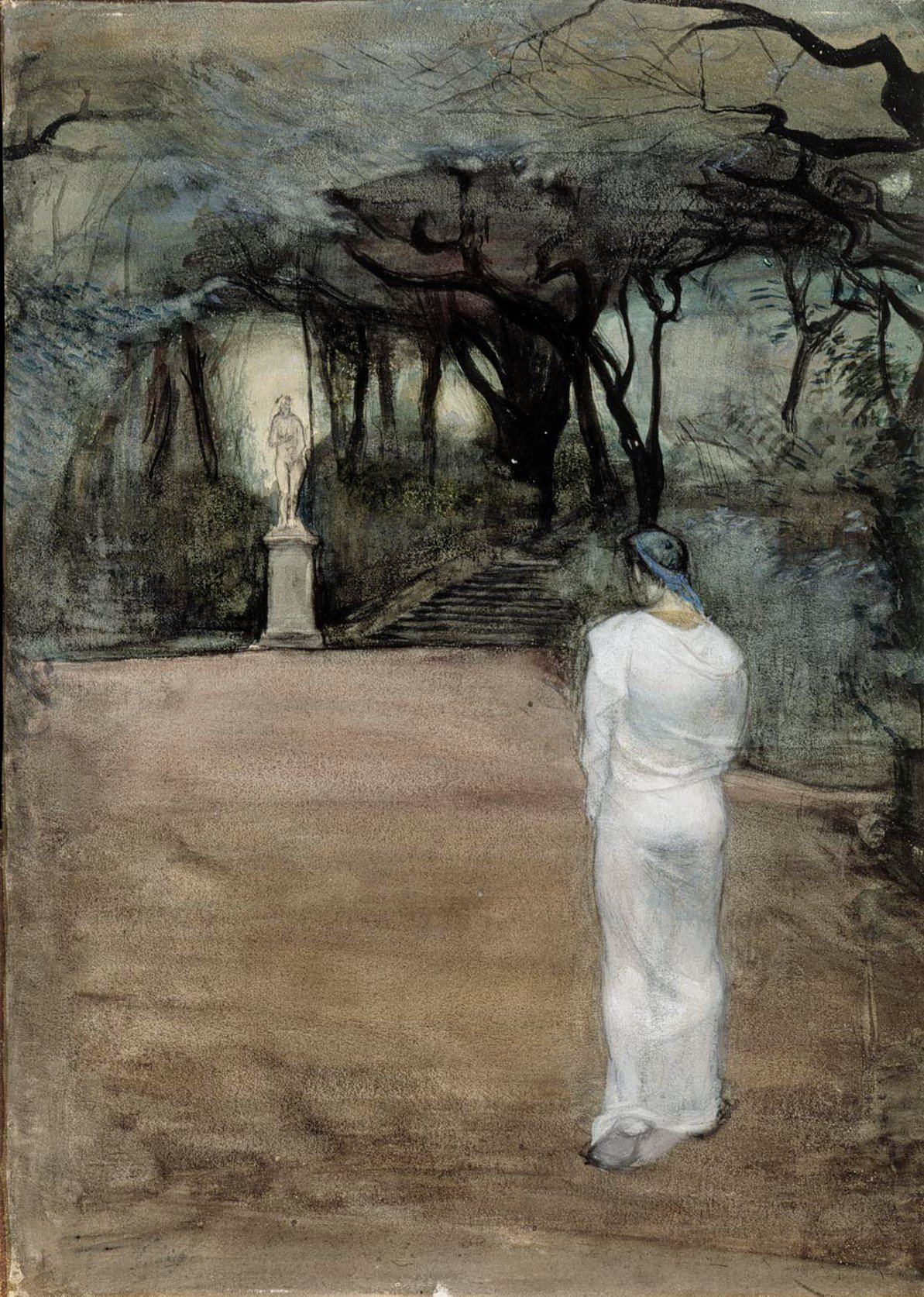
The Cult of Venus, 1895

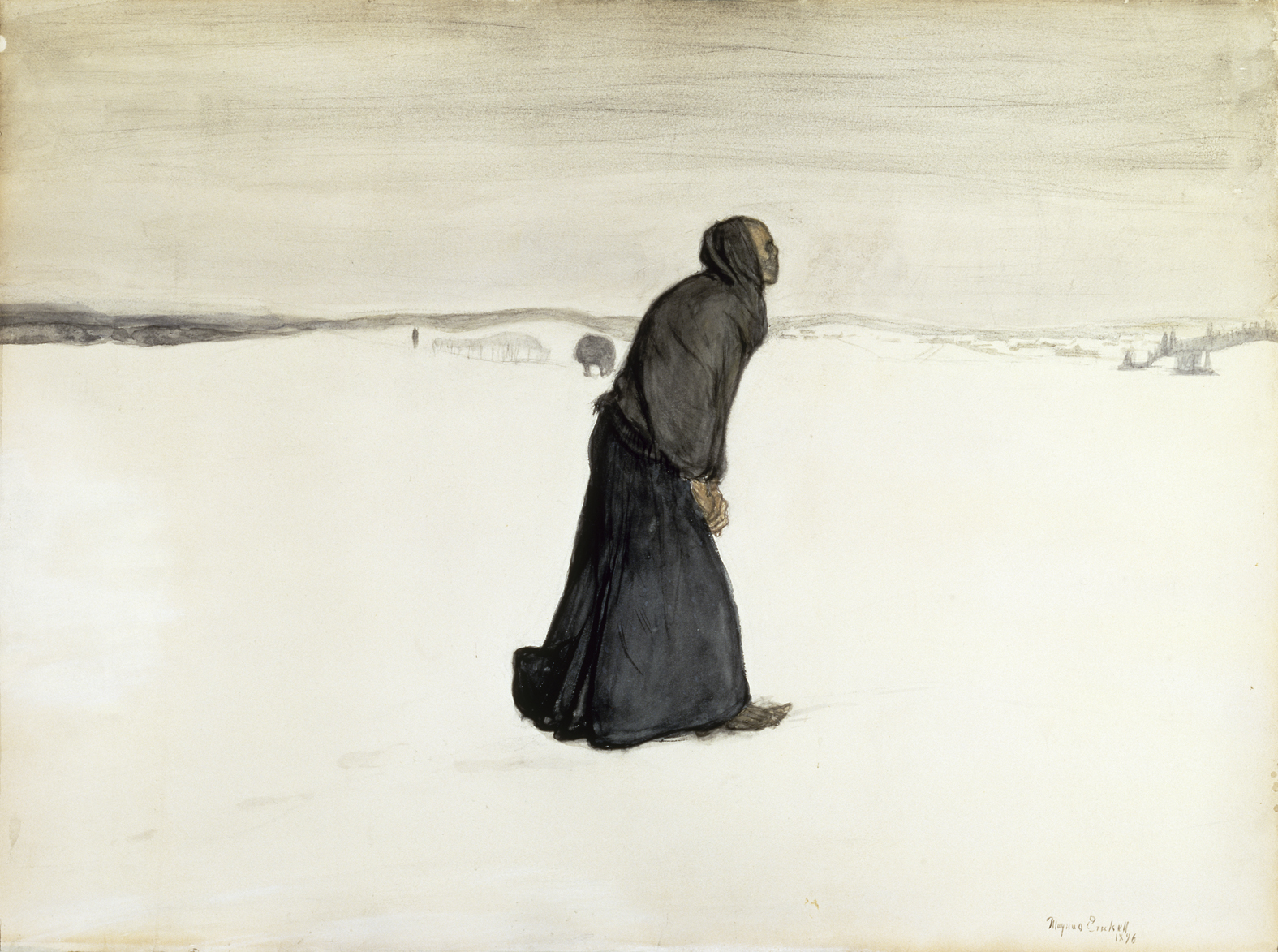
Death's Walk, 1896

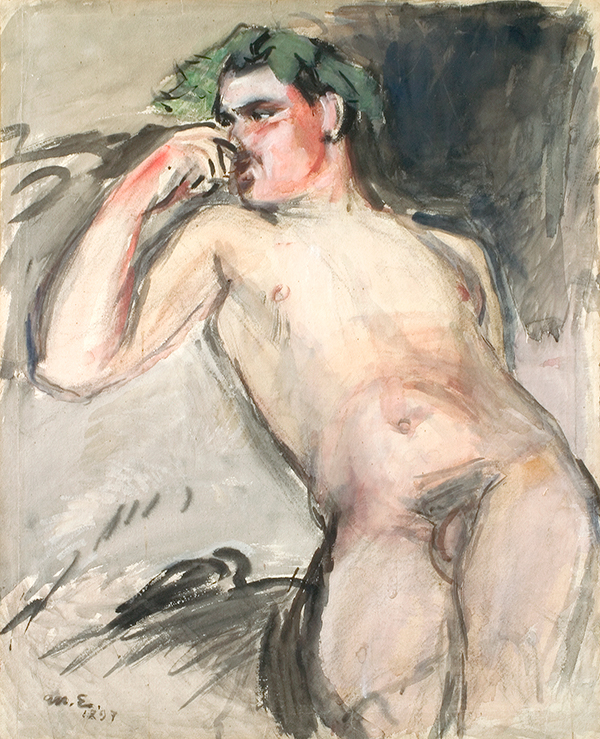
Bacchant, 1897

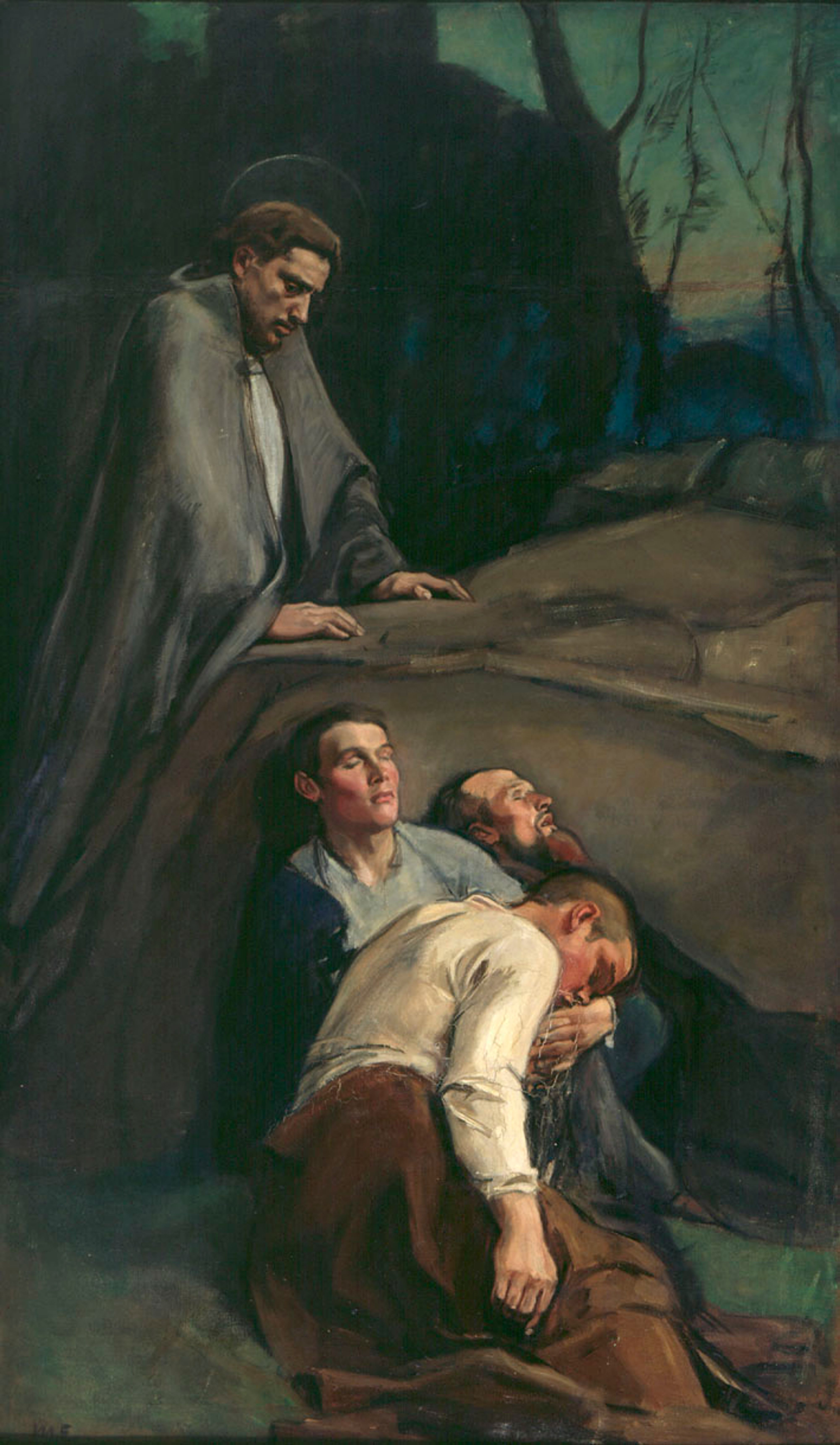
Gethsemane, 1902

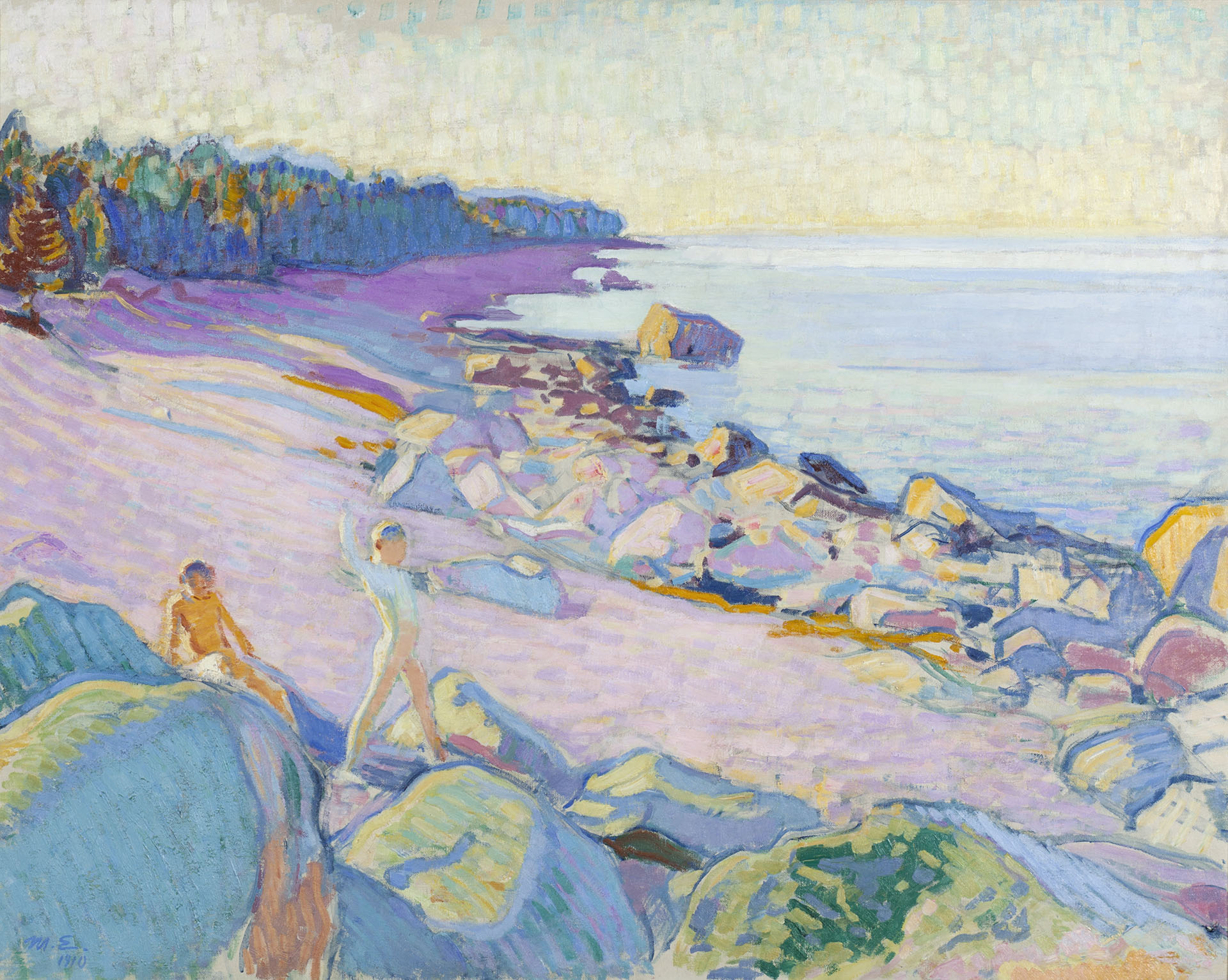
Boys on the Beach, 1910

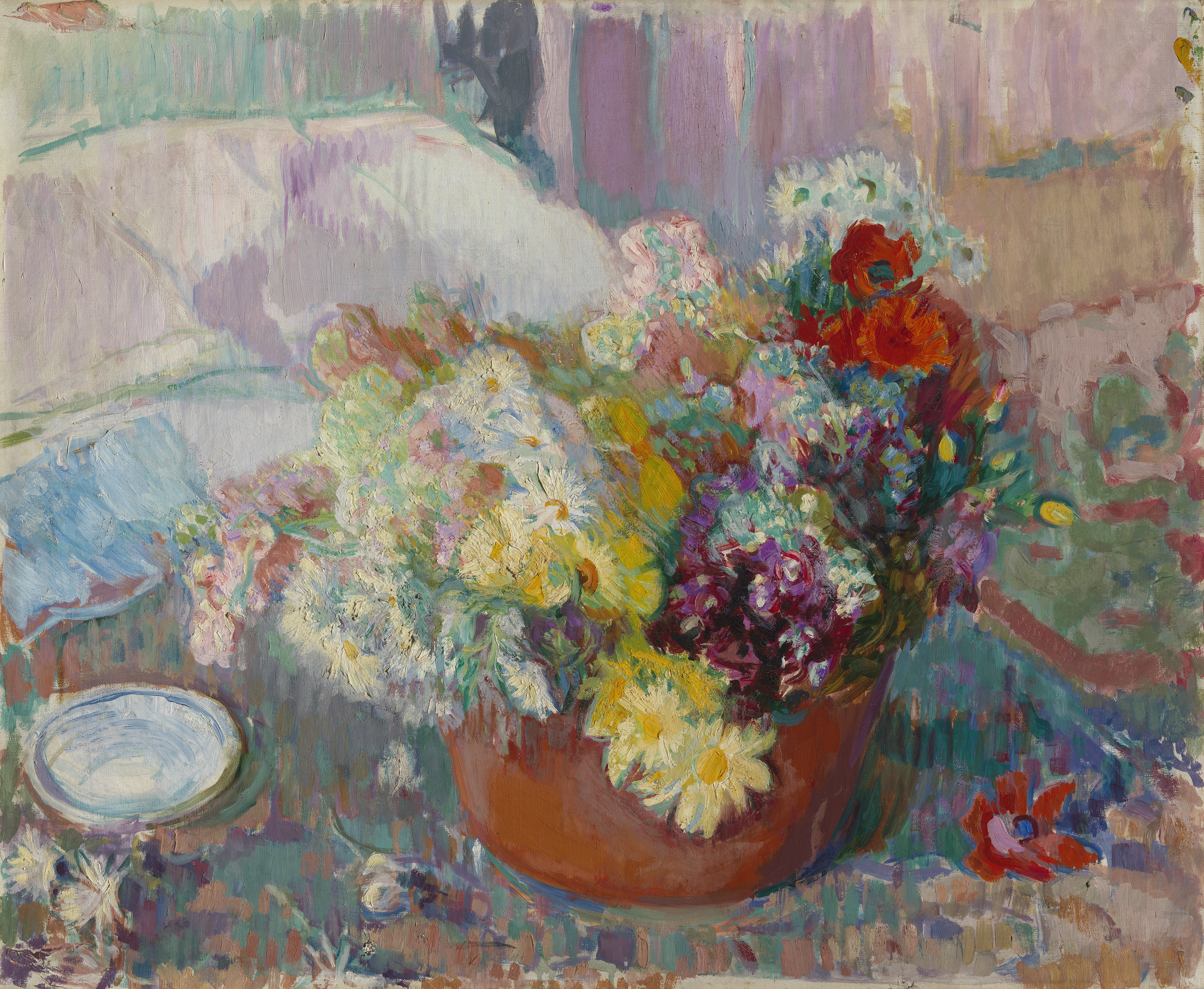
Flowers, 1912–1913

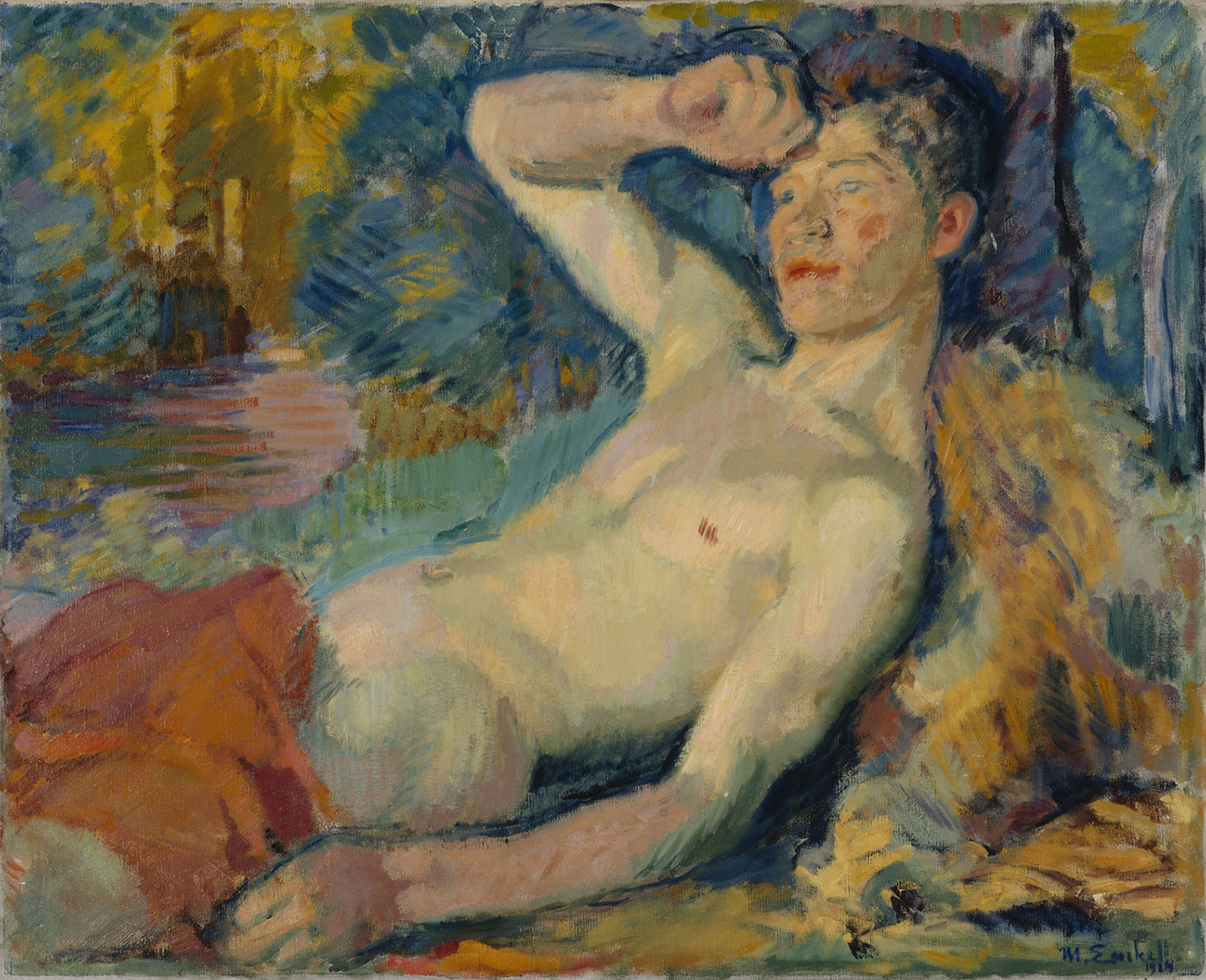
Awakening Faun, 1914

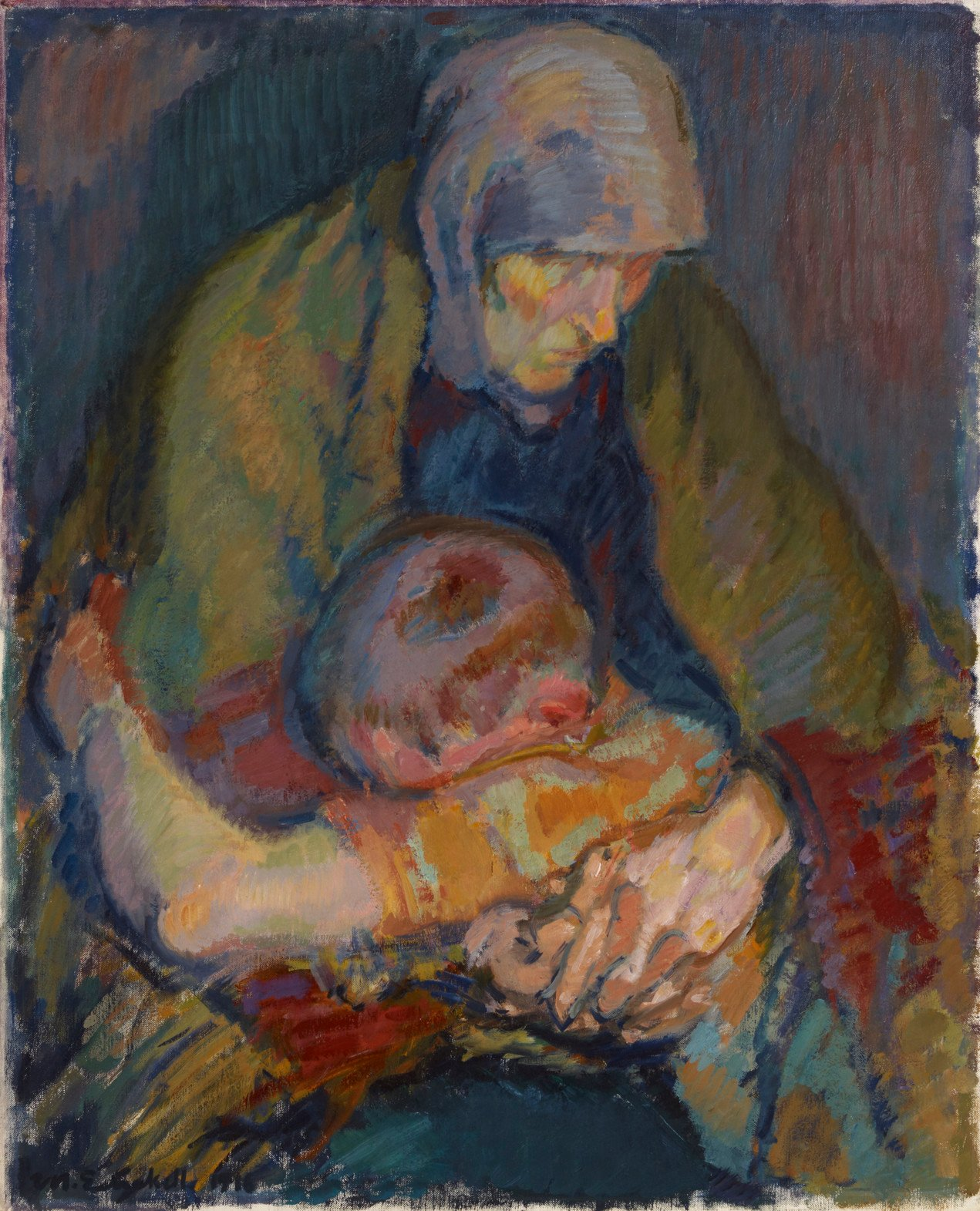
Pietà, 1916

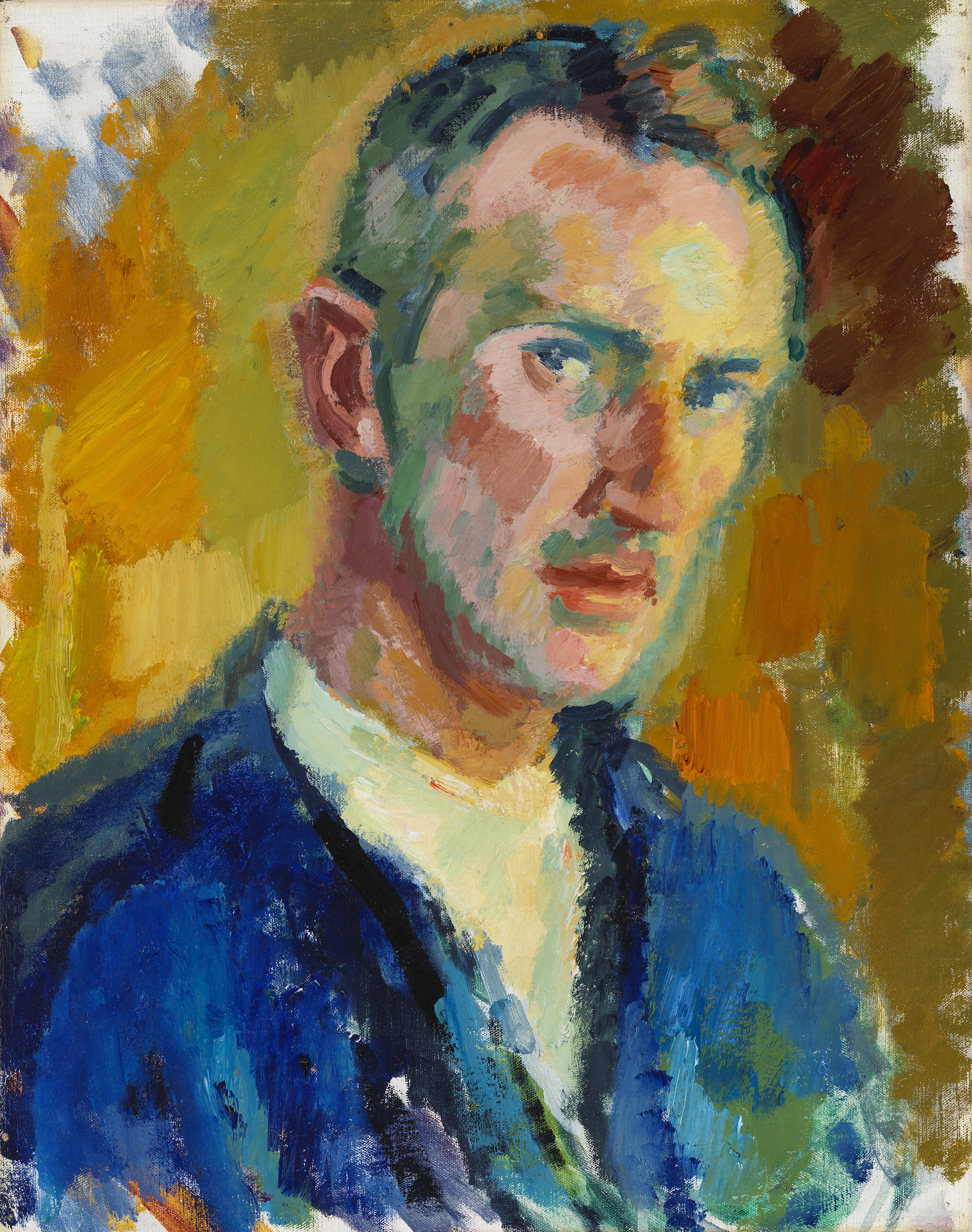
Self-Portrait, 1918

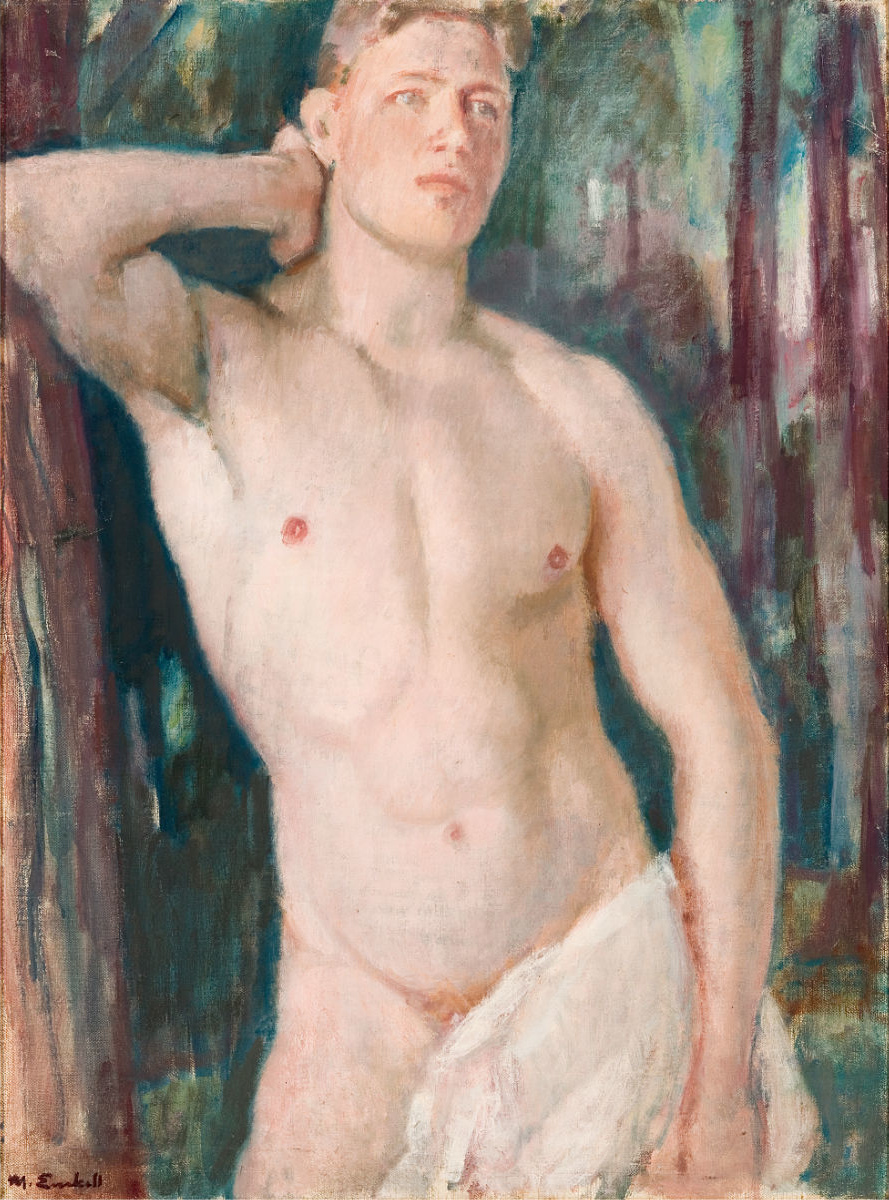
Young Nude Male, 1920s – the white cloth possibly painted on later

== See also ==
- Golden Age of Finnish Art
- Finnish art

== Sources ==
- S. Koja, ed. Nordic Dawn Modernism's Awakening in Finland 1890–1920 [exhibition catalogue] (2005)
- Magnus Enckell 1870–1925 [exhibition catalogue, Helsinki City Art Museum] (2000)
- Magnus Enckell 1870–1925 [exhibition catalogue, Tampere Art Museum] (1988)
