= Albert Baertsoen =

Belgian painter (1866–1922)

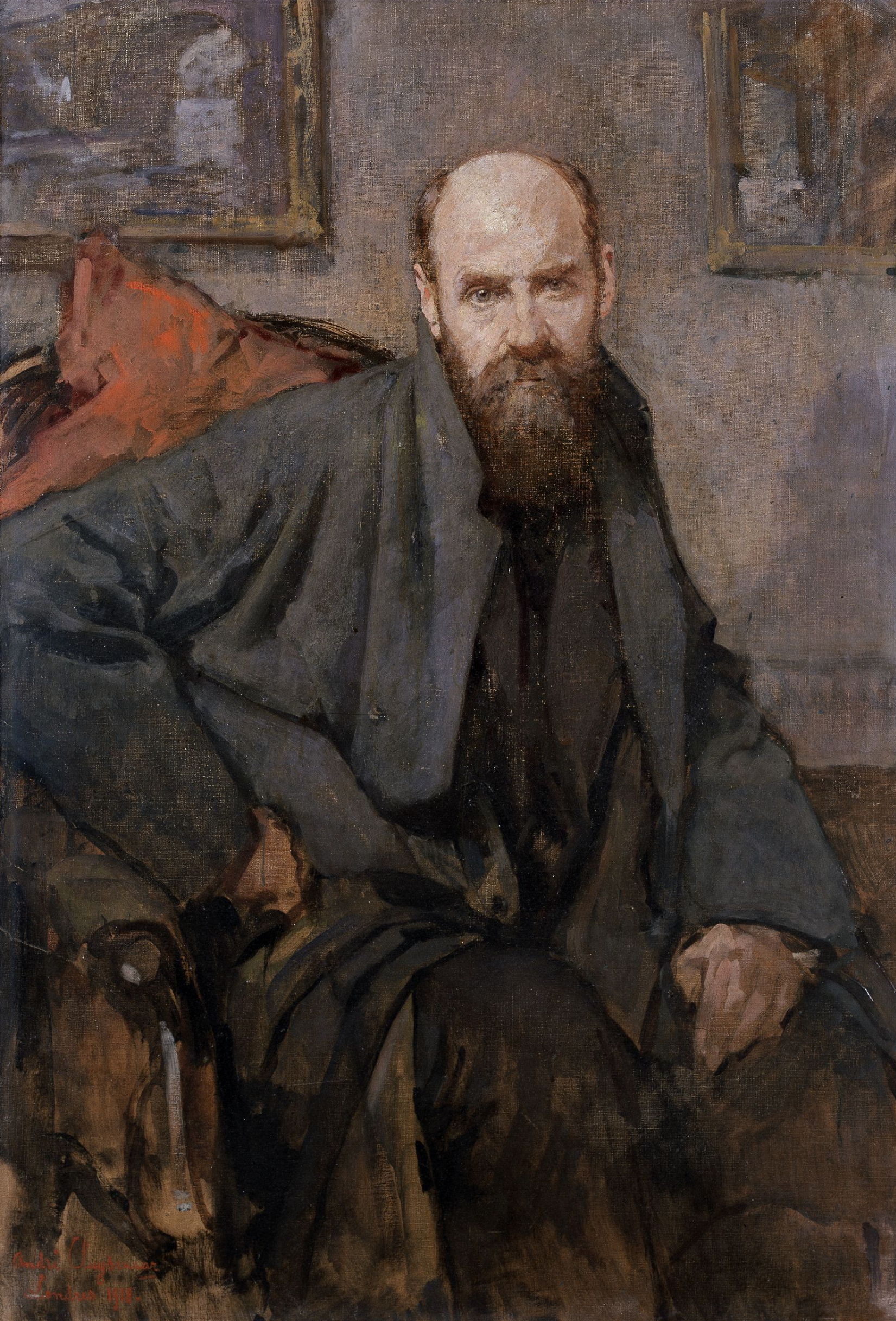
- Portrait of Albert Baertsoen by André Cluysenaar
- Born: Albert Baertsoen; 9 January 1866; Ghent, Belgium
- Died: 9 June 1922 (aged 56); Ghent, Belgium
- Education: Royal Academy of Fine Arts; Alfred Philippe Roll
- Occupation: Painter

Albert Baertsoen (9 January 1866 – 9 June 1922) was a Belgian painter, pastellist and graphic artist. His subjects were mainly landscapes and especially townscapes, many depicting his hometown Ghent and - during World War I - London.

== Life and work ==
He was born in Ghent. His father was an industrialist and textile manufacturer. In 1882, he enrolled in the Royal Academy of Fine Arts, where he studied under Gustave Den Duyts and Jean Delvin. His debut as a painter came in 1887, when he participated in an exhibition in Brussels held by the secessionist group l'Essor.

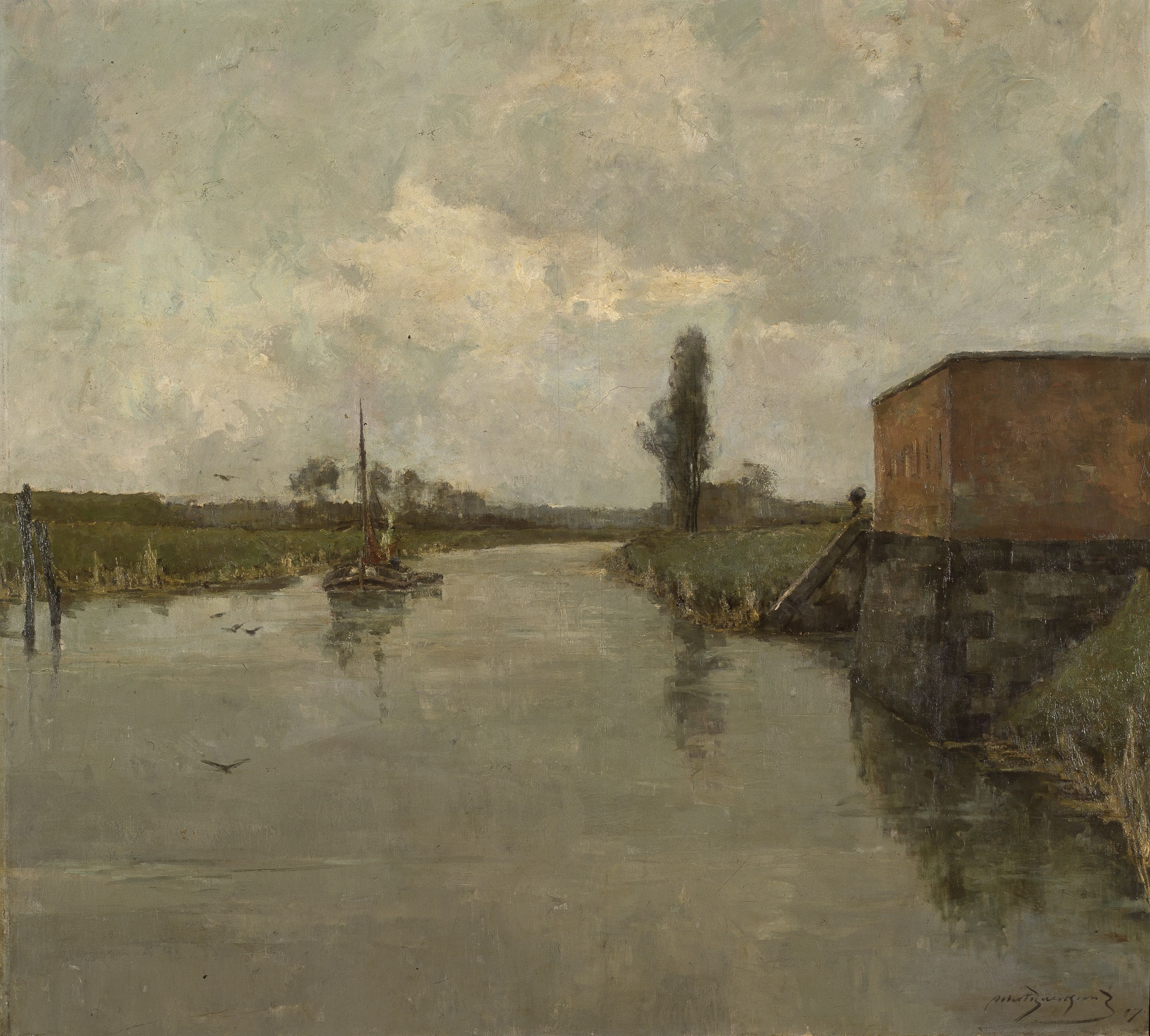
View near Dendermonde

He continued his studies in Paris, at the art school of Alfred Philippe Roll, and exhibited at the Salon in 1889. The following year, he accompanied James Ensor, Frantz Charlet and other Belgian painters on a study trip to London. In 1894, he helped found the "Cercle des Beaux-Arts d'Ostende". The years 1894/95 saw another stay in Paris, where his painting "Oude Vlaamse Vaart" (Old Flemish Sails) was acquired by the Musée du Luxembourg and he participated in an exhibition held by La Libre Esthétique. From 1896 to 1901, he continued to exhibit throughout Europe, winning several Gold Medals.

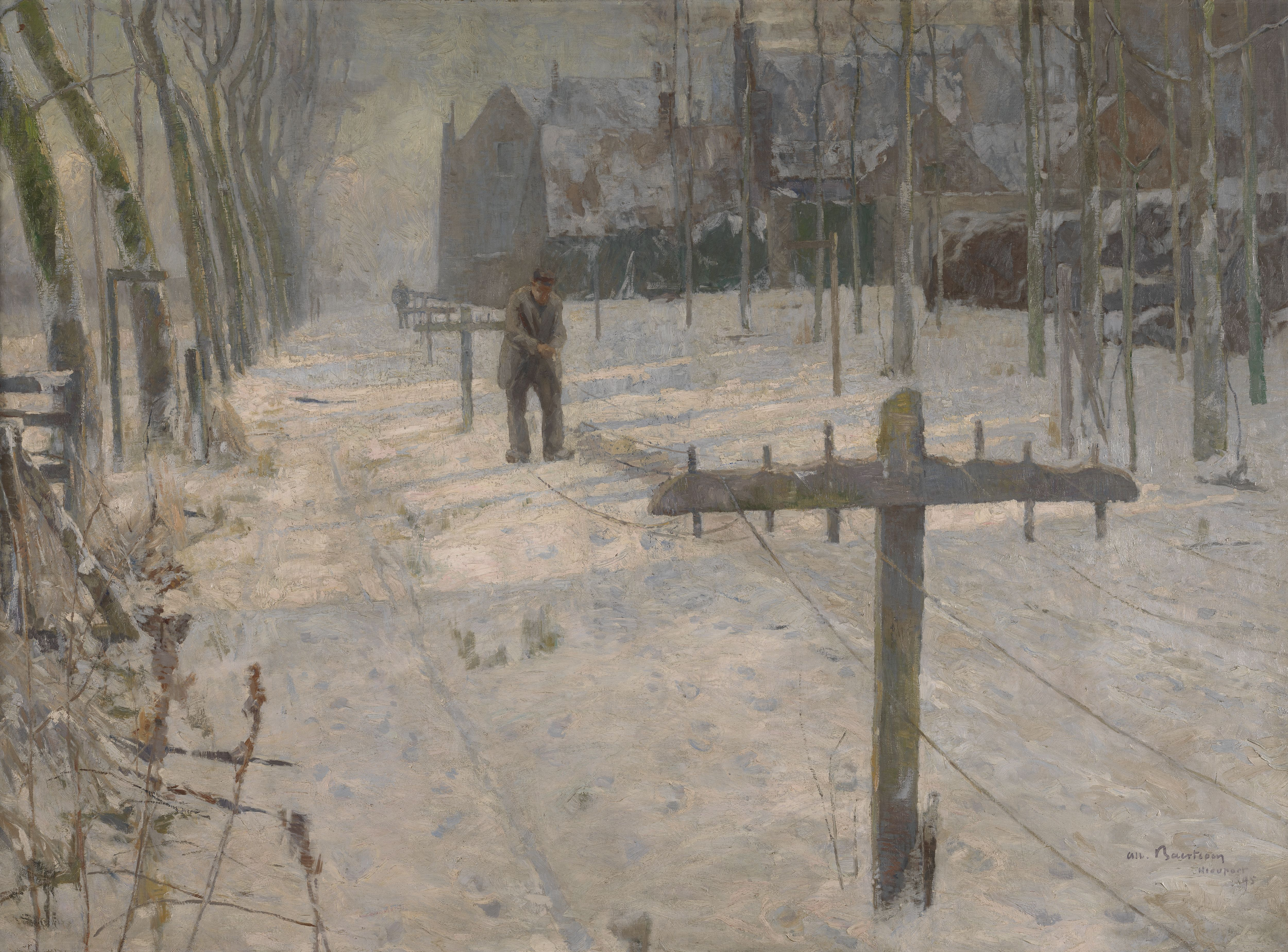
Snow Morning in Flanders. Rope-Makers on the Ramparts Museum of Fine Arts, Ghent

In 1913, he served as a member of the art jury for the Ghent World's Fair. In 1914, more than 50 prints and drawings of his were being exhibited in the Brussels art circle L'Estampe. During World War I, he lived in London, returning to Ghent in 1919. That same year, he was appointed a member of the Royal Academy of Belgium. Two years later, a retrospective of his work was held at the Galerie Georges Giroux in Brussels. He died in Ghent in 1922.

== Honours ==
- 1919 : Commander of the Order of the Crown.
- 1919: Member of the Royal Academie.

== Writings ==
- "De la mémoire visuelle chez l'artiste", in the Bulletin de l'Académie Royale de Belgique, Classe des Beaux-Arts, nrs. 9-10, Brussels, 1920
