= Rodolphe Wytsman =

Belgian painter (1860–1927)

Rodolphe Paul Marie Wytsman
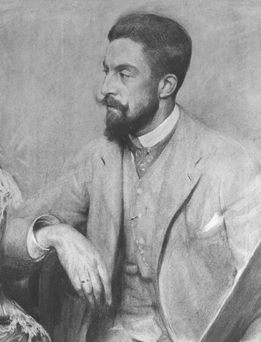
- Portrait of Rodolphe Wytsman (1897)
- Born: 11 March 1860; Dendermonde, Belgium
- Died: 2 November 1927 (aged 67); Linkebeek, Belgium
- Education: Académie Royale des Beaux-Arts
- Known for: Painting
- Movement: Impressionism
- Spouse: Juliette Wytsman

Rodolphe Paul Marie Wytsman (11 March 1860 – 2 November 1927) was a Belgian Impressionist painter. He trained at the Académie Royale des Beaux-Arts in Brussels, and was one of the founding members of Les XX, a group of avant-garde Belgian artists.

== Life ==
=== Origin ===
Rodolphe Wytsman was born in Dendermonde, Belgium. He was the son of Klemens Wytsman (1825–1870), an Austrian immigrant who was notary and shipping agent, and Emma-Maria Cockuyt (born in Ghent, c. 1838). In 1886 Wytsman married Juliette Trullemans (b. Brussels, 1866–d. Elsene, 1925), also a painter. During three decades of marriage they resided in or near Brussels, except during World War I, when they fled to the Netherlands.

=== Early life ===
Wytsman grew up in a cultured environment. His father was—apart from being a notary—a numismatist, historian and composer. Among his friends were the Flemish composers François Auguste Gevaert and Peter Benoit and the French literary figure, Victor Hugo. Wytsman's father died prematurely on 27 November 1870 when Rodolphe was only nine or ten. Shortly thereafter, Wytsman's mother moved to her hometown of Dendermonde, 20 miles north of Brussels.

In 1873 Wytsman took courses at the academy in Ghent from Jean Capeinick (1838–1890), a Belgian painter who specialized in still lifes and rich, colorful floral arrangements. Capeinick, a true professional, also taught Théo van Rysselberghe, a Belgian neo-impressionist who was influential at the turn of the century. Wytsman's studies were interrupted by a lucrative job in a yarn shop. After three years, and against the wishes of his mother, he left this tedious occupation and resumed his studies at the academy, studying under Théodore-Joseph Canneel and Julius De Keghel. Wytsman became friends with artists van Rysselberghe, Gustave Vanaise and Armand Heins; the latter remained a lifelong friend. As a painter Wytsman gravitated toward landscapes. His early works—at this time painted near Ghent—were realistic. In the following years he developed a more pre-Impressionist style. By 1881 Wytsman lived in Brussels, where he was influenced by early Modernist Painting.

=== Brussels ===
Wytsman's mother moved back to Brussels, where Rodolphe continued his studies at the Academy of Fine Arts. He studied under Jean Portaels, Joseph Stallaert and Joseph van Severdonck. His fellow students included Eugene Broerman, Francois Halkett, Frantz Charlet, and van Rysselberghe. James Ensor and Guillaume Van Strydonck were also students at that time. At the Brussels Academy, he came into contact with the artists group L'Essor, founded on 4 March 1876 by some students at the academy. Wytsman's training ended in 1881. By that time he already had exhibited his painting The Night at the Salon of Ghent.

=== Early 1880s ===
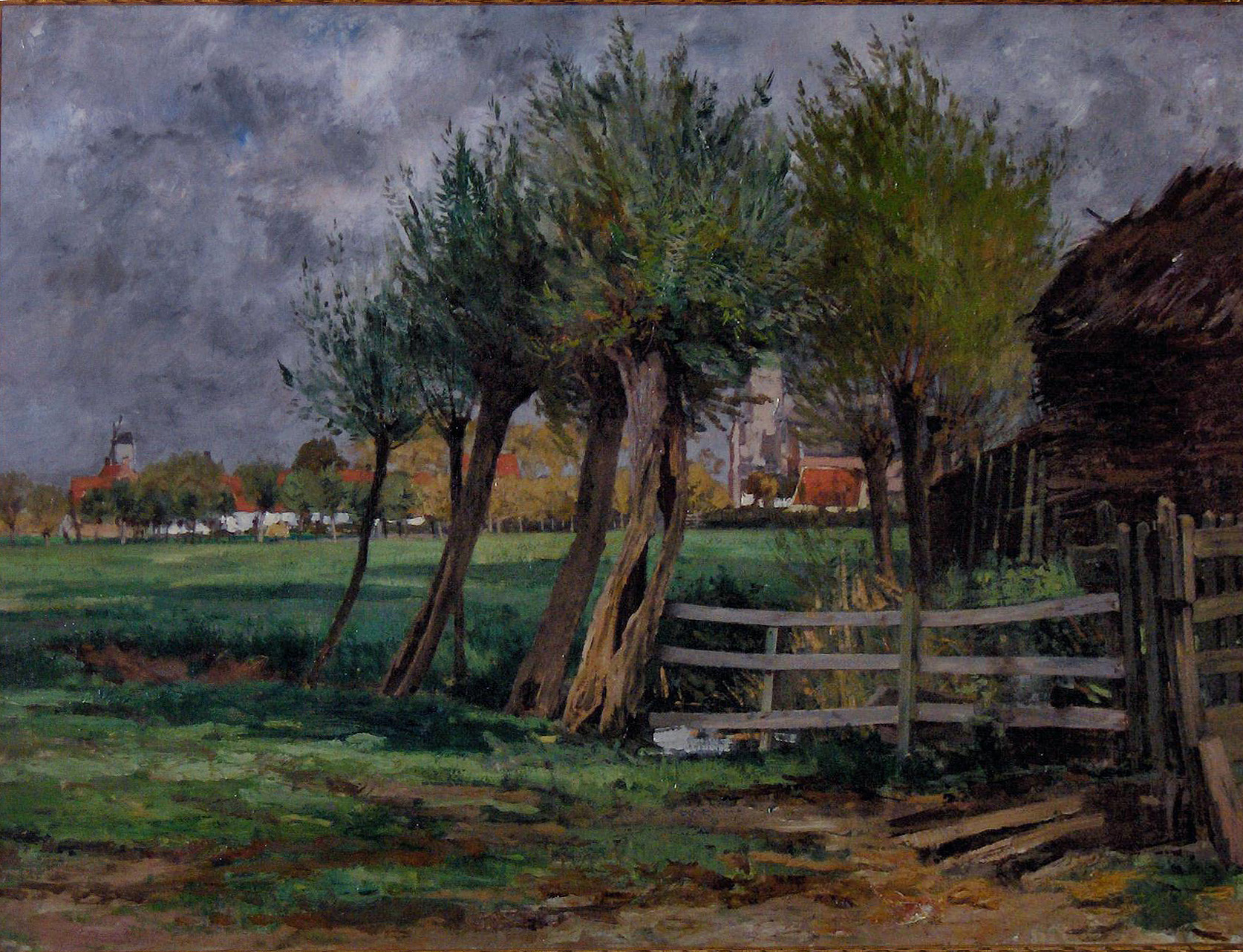
Rudolphe Wytsman: Rural Scene (Flemish title: Plattelandsgezicht)

In 1882, financially supported by a friend of his late father, he visited Italy, including Rome and surrounding areas, and the Neapolitan coast made an indelible impression on him. Works dating from that era include Fountain in the Villa Borghese in Roma and Rocks on Capri. In Italy, he had friendly contacts with other Belgian artists then resident there: Gustave Vanaise, Jef Lambeaux, Leon Philippet, Eugene Broerman and Alexandre Marcet.

In May 1883, Wytsman exhibited together with Vanaise at the "Cercle Artistique" in Ghent. From 1883 on, he rusticated annually in Knokke, a Belgian seaside resort where an influential artists colony gathered each summer. Regulars included landscape painters from Ghent and Brussels—among them Alfred Verwee, Willy Schlobach, Théo van Rysselberghe, Anna Boch, Félicien Rops, James Ensor, Willy Finch and the noted Impressionist Camille Pissarro. Wytsman painted the dunes, the beach, the polders and the Zwin (now a nature preserve).

== Les XX ==
In 1883, Wytsman was a founding member of Les XX, a noted avant-garde group in Brussels, inspired by the art critic Octave Maus. Other founders included Frantz Charlet, Jean Delvin, Darío de Regoyos, Paul Du Bois, James Ensor, Willy Finch, Fernand Khnopff and Pericles Pantazis. Until 1887, Wytsman exhibited in the annual Salons of Les XX, but the following year, he and Isidore Verheyden resigned from that group and would not exhibit, even if invited. Wytsman resigned without a stated reason, but wrote that he hoped to remain friends with members of the group.

Works Wytsman exhibited at Les XX included:

- 1884: La Ferme du Moulin (Flandre), Les Fleurs (West-Flandre) & La mare (The Dunes Knocke)
- 1885: Le Moulin de Knocke, La Neige, a Melle, Fin d'automne, a Boitsfort & La Prairie
- 1886: La Neige, Pavot et coquelicots, Crepuscule, a Boitsfort, Le Bois, Pluvieux Temps, La mare, Ixelles", "Coin d'Etang, Soir, Fin d'automne and further: Serie d'impressions and Pastel
- 1887: Automne, Coin de jardin, Fin Novembre, Le Moulin à eau, Le canal de Delft, Soir and A Delft.

== Marriage ==
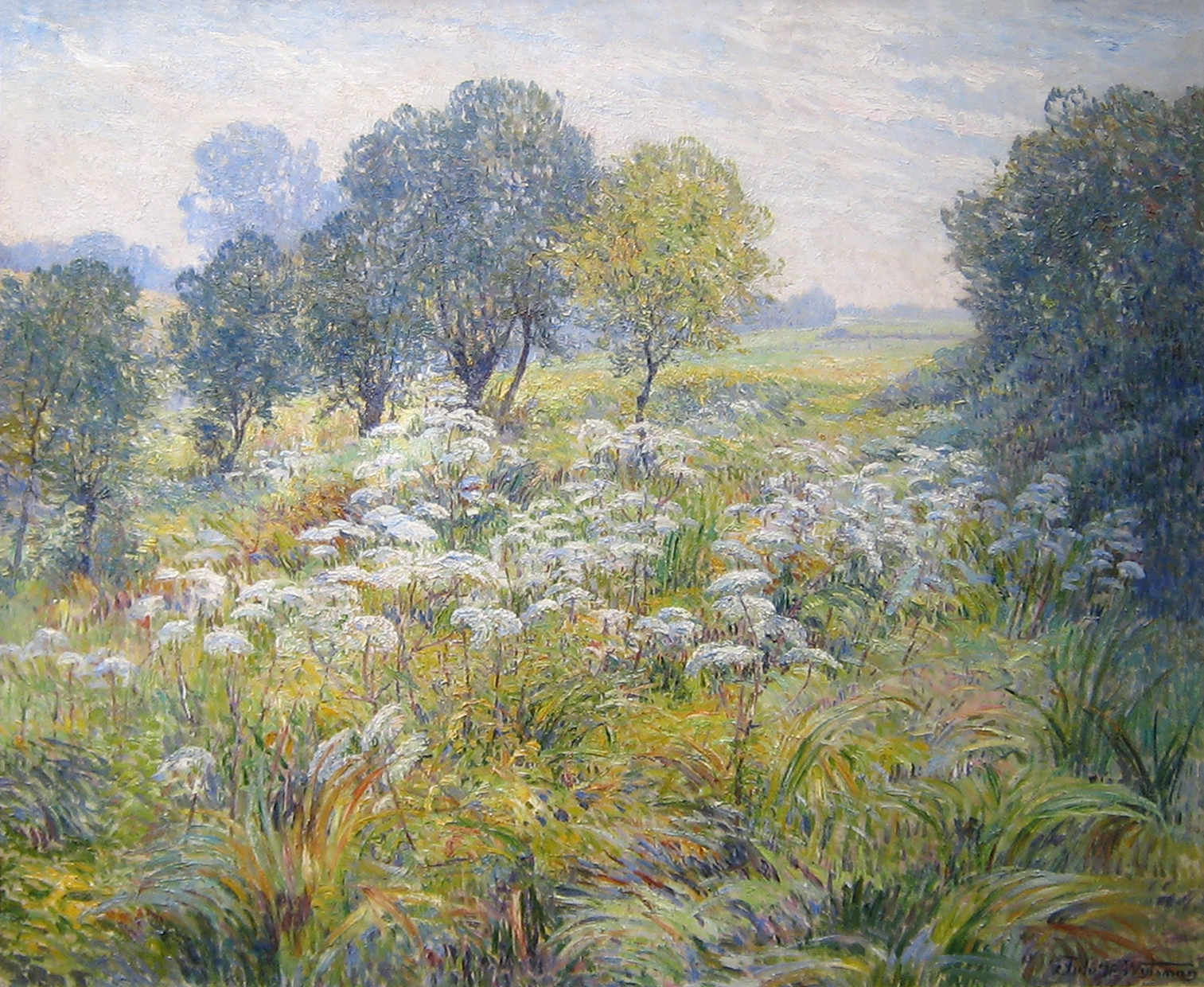
Juliette Wytsman: Spirea

It was in Capeinick's studio that Wytsman met his wife-to be, Juliette Trullemans. Soon they were painting together at Knokke and began to see each other regularly. They were married on 16 February 1886. It was an ideal pairing: both painted sunlit landscapes and tableaux with plants and shrubs that were very popular. The two artists' careers melded harmoniously, and the proceeds allowed them to take many trips. In addition to their Brussels domiciles, they had a country house in La Hulpe, southeast of Brussels in central Belgium. They developed close friendships with the writer and writer Camille Lemonnier, the sculptor and painter Charles Verstappen, and the Luminist painter Emile Claus. In 1892, they acquired an estate called Les Tournesols in the bucolic Brussels suburb of Linkebeek. Around their house was a large flower garden in the midst of a largely untouched landscape, which inspired many paintings.

Besides landscapes, the Wytsmans preferred to paint bright flowers, herbs and plants, which often appear in the foreground of their paintings, usually with a vista of the surrounding countryside: ponds, marshes, flowering trees, flower beds, blooming heaths and fallow land overgrown with weeds and wildflowers.

== Exhibitions ==
Late in the 19th century Wytsman exhibited with La Libre Esthétique, a group of artists who joined after the dissolution of Les XX in 1893. Besides participating in the Triennial Salons of Antwerp, Brussels and Ghent, he organized some double exhibitions with his wife at smaller salons in other cities. Exhibited works includedApple trees in bloom and The village road.

After the turn of the century, Wytsman exhibited works in pastel regularly. In 1903, he sent four to an "Exhibition of watercolor paintings, pastels, etchings and other" in Antwerp, including The heap, The Nut, The road to the Moors and Evening in Brabant – October. In 1900, both Wytsmans exhibited in the Belgian section of fine arts at the World's Fair in Paris and the 1908 Belgian Art Exhibition in Berlin. In 1907, a handful of Belgian artists, including the Wytsmans, participated in an exhibition at the Zacheta room in Warsaw.

== The First World War ==
When World War I broke out in August 1914 there was a mass exodus from Belgium—invaded by German forces—to France, England, the Netherlands and the U.S., with a few going to Switzerland. The Wytsmans went to Rotterdam in the Netherlands, which remained neutral through the war. About a dozen other Belgian artists also fled to the Netherlands.

The Wytsmans set up an exhibition in Rotterdam's art circle that featured Belgian artists. Discreetly they supported needy colleagues, including the painter and sculptor Rik Wouters. When in 1916 Wouters died of cancer in Amsterdam, it was Rodolphe Wytsman who gave the eulogy. In November 1916 the Stedelijk Museum in Amsterdam presented an exhibition of Belgian art. Rodolphe Wytsman was in the organizing committee for this exhibition.

== Last years ==
After the war the Wytsmans returned to Linkebeek. The last years of their life together transpired quietly, and they did not become involved in the innovative European art trends that gained ascendancy in the interwar period. In 1925 they together prepared a double retrospective, their last major exhibit.

Juliette Wytsman-Trullemans died at home on 8 March 1925, aged 59. Rodolphe survived her by two years; he died in Linkebeek on 2 Nov. 1927, aged 67.

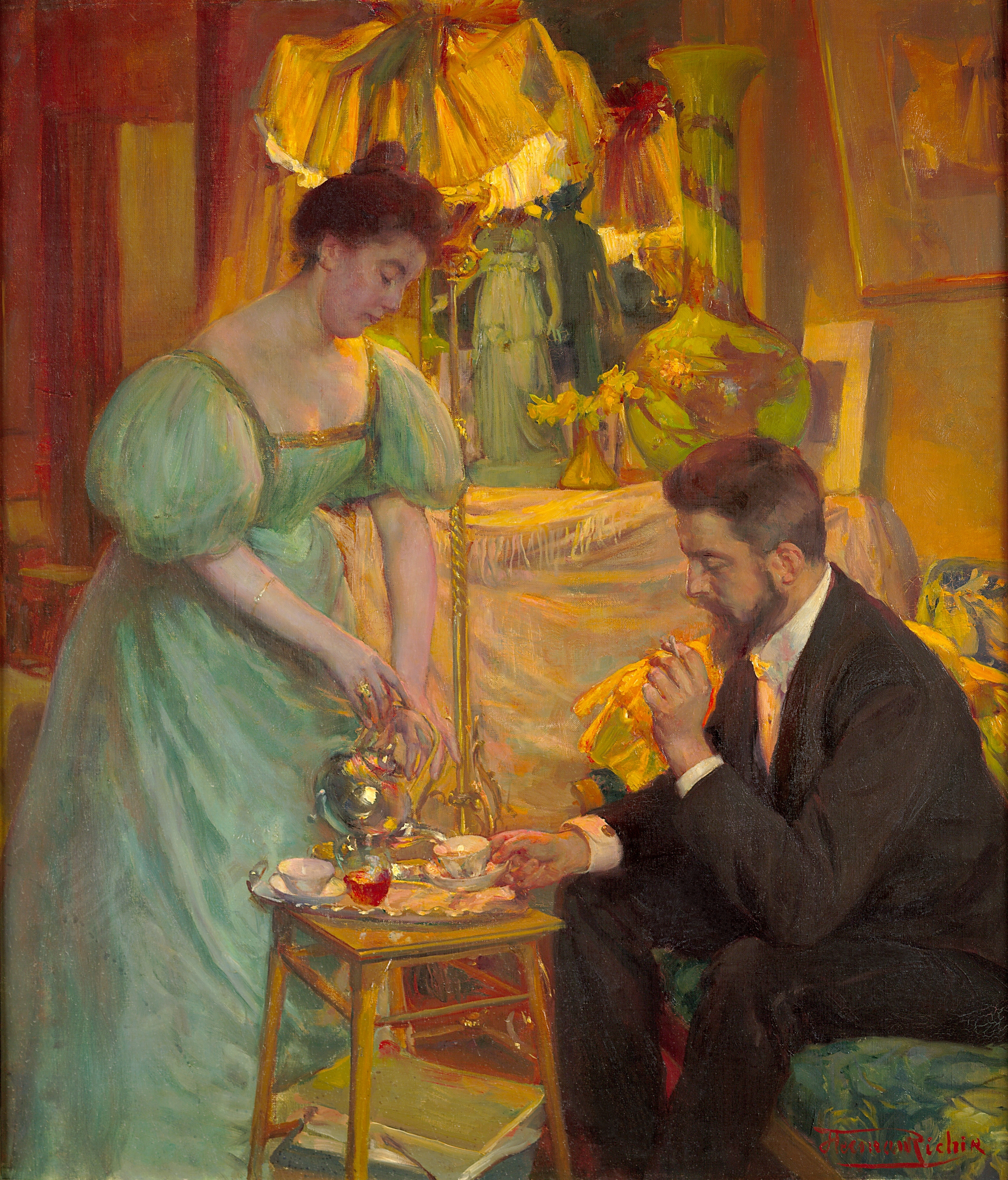
Herman Richir: The Tea Hour (c. 1896)

== Style ==
Juliette and Rodolphe Wytsman's technique reflected a realistic pre-Impressionist style. They both sought to depict the effects of intense light in their paintings. Both are among the main representatives of the Luminist genre in neo-Impressionism, and they share the place with artists such as Emile Claus and his students Jenny Montigny and Anna De Weert, Adrien-Joseph Heymans, Georges Morren and Georges Buysse.

== Addendum ==
Rudolphe Wystman was one of the private teachers of the German Princess Marie of Hohenzollern-Sigmaringen, who was mother of King Albert I of Belgium, and who was herself an accomplished artist.

The Museum of Ixelles, Belgium, holds a portrait of Rudolphe Wytsman in oil by Jehan Frison, and the painting The Tea Hour by Herman Richir (right)—a double portrait of Juliette and Rodolphe Wytsman.

== Museums and public collections ==
- Amsterdam,
- Antwerp
- Barcelona
- Buenos Aires
- Brussels, Camille Lemonnier Museum
- Dendermonde
- Ixelles (Brussels), Musée d'Ixelles (large ensemble, including sketchbooks)
- Gent
- Huy
- Knokke
- Liege
- 0ostende, Mu.ZEE
- Sabadell
- Saint-Josse-ten-Noode (Brussels)
- Tienen
- Tokyo
- Uccle (Brussels)
- Verviers
- Collection of the Region Wallonne (The Meuse to Wépion)
