= Frantz Charlet =

Belgian painter (1862–1928)

- Born: 21/29 January 1862; Brussels, Belgium
- Died: 8 August 1928; Paris, France
- Education: Jean-François Portaels
- Known for: Painting, Etching, Lithography
- Notable work: Young girl, Cursal d'Ostende, Die Goldenen Häuser von Brügge
- Movement: Impressionism

Frantz Charlet (1862–1928) was a Belgian painter, etcher, and lithographer.

== Early life and career ==
An Impressionist, he was one of the founding members of the group Les XX. He studied at the Académie Royale des Beaux-Arts in Brussels from 1872 until 1873 and again from 1876 to 1881; among his fellow pupils there were Eugène Broerman, François-Joseph Halkett, Théo van Rysselberghe and Rodolphe Wytsman, and his teacher was Jean-François Portaels.

== Gallery ==
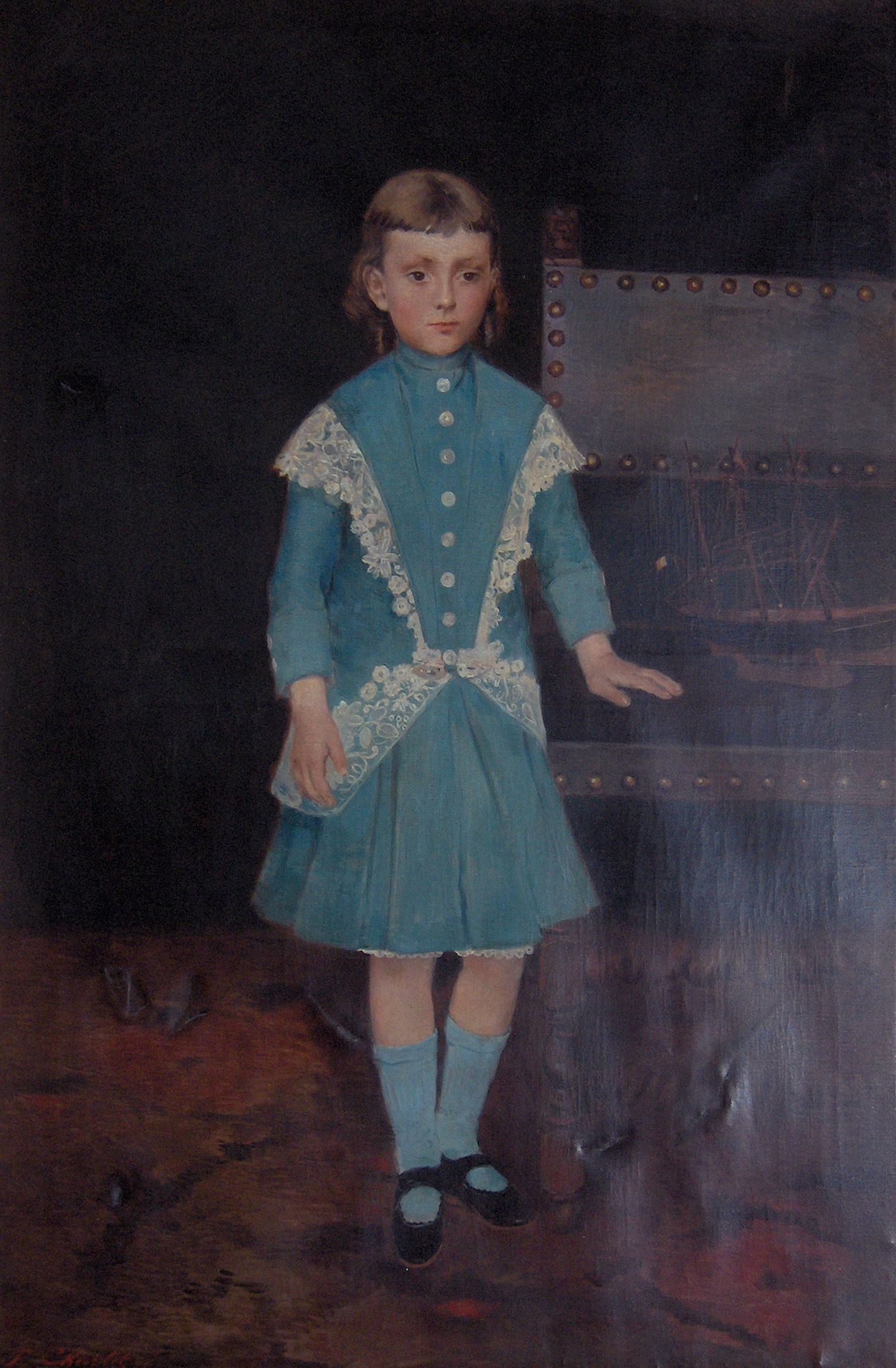
Young girl, oil painting

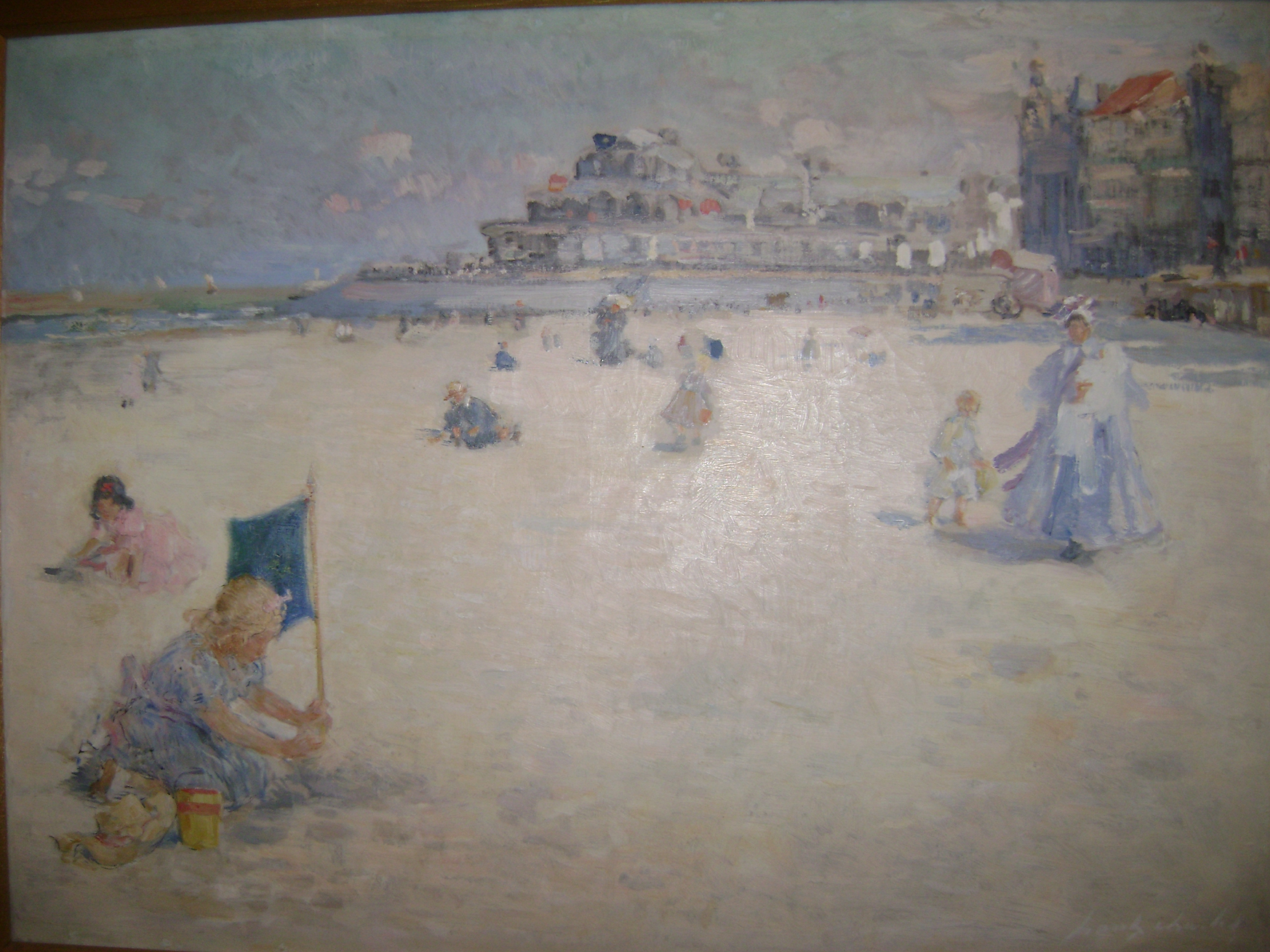
Cursal d'Ostende, 1922, Musée d'Ixelles

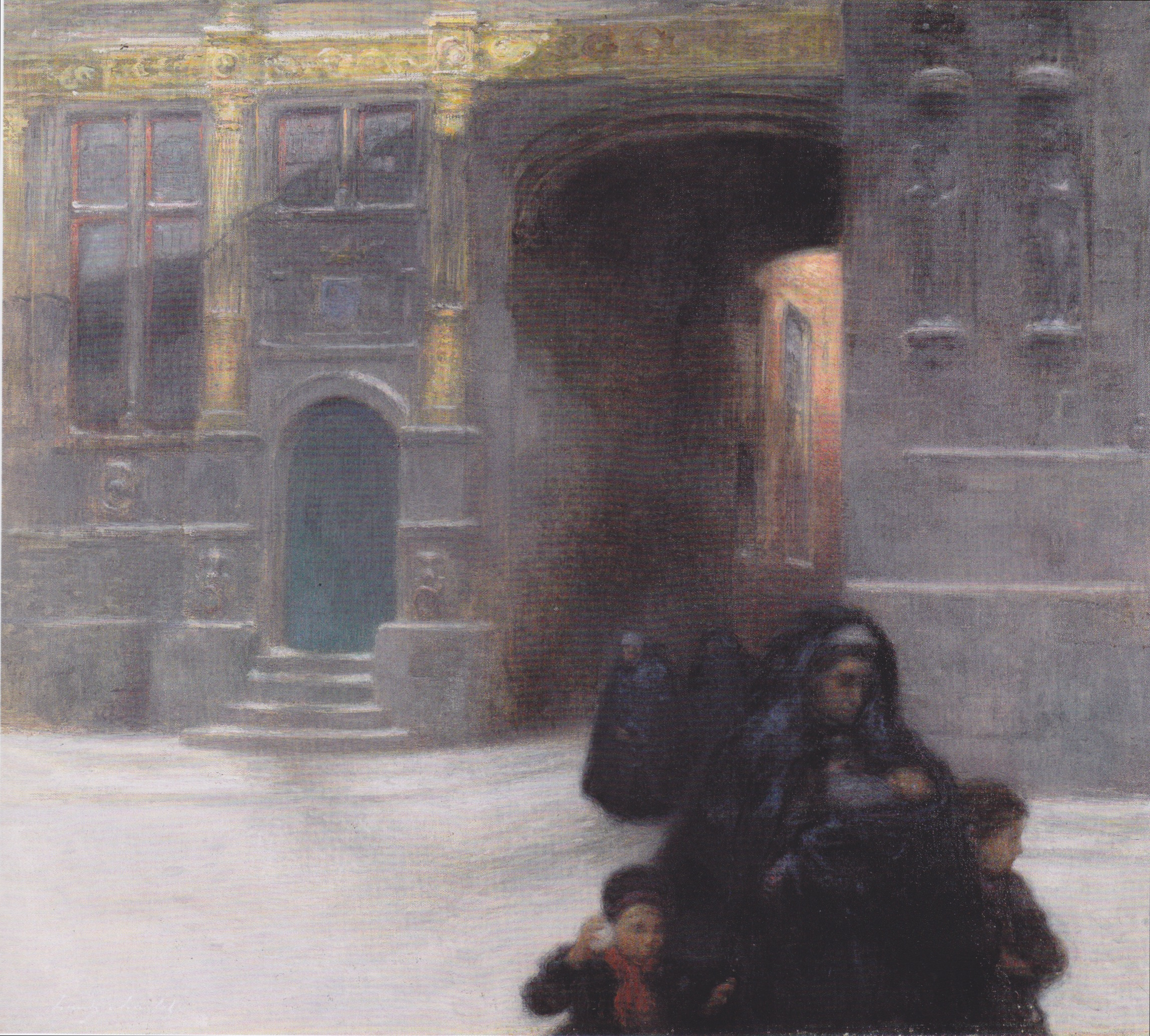
Die Goldenen Häuser von Brügge, oil on canvas

== See also ==
- Les XX
