= Linkebeek =

- Municipality
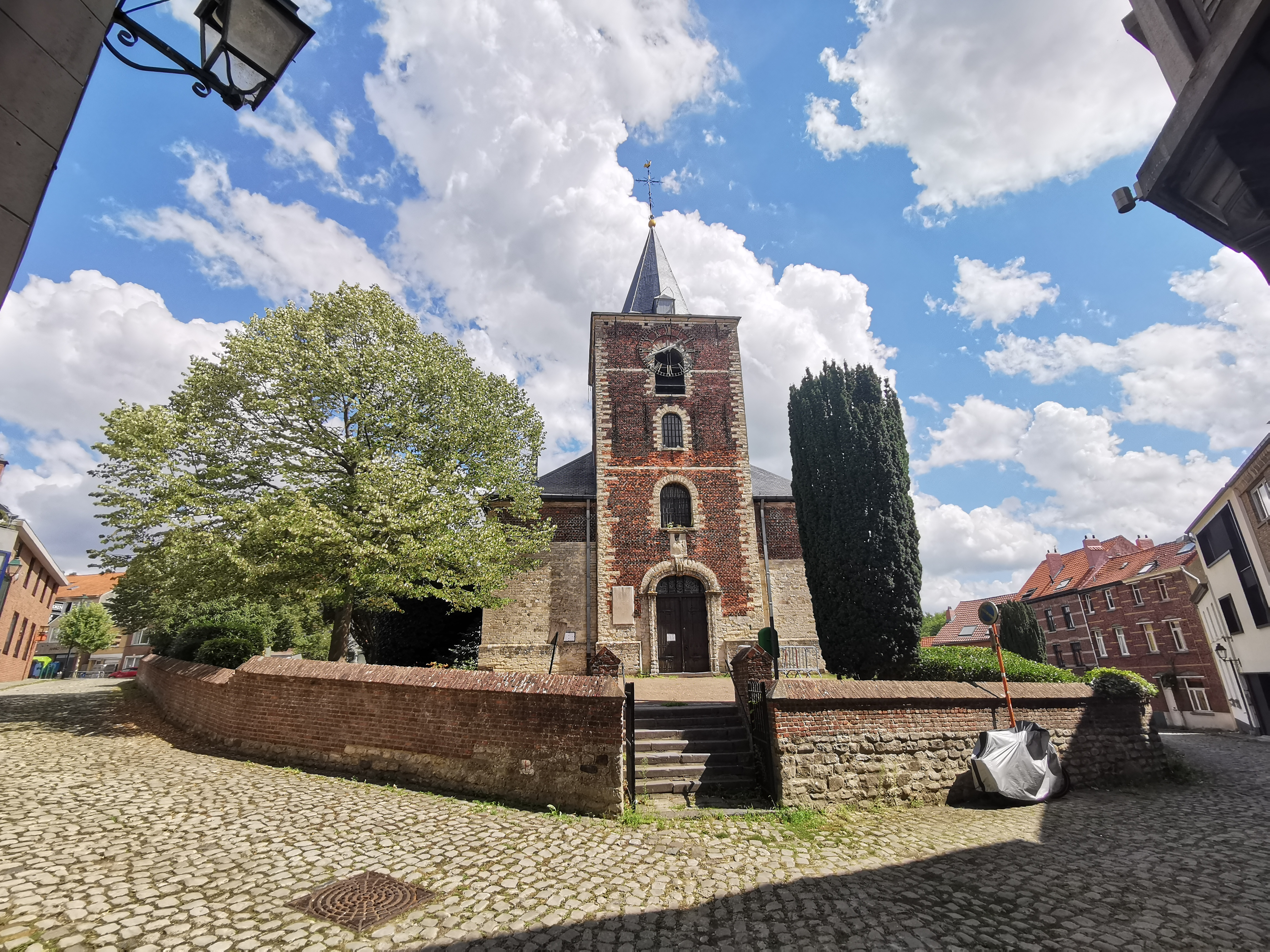

- Flag Coat of arms

- Location of Linkebeek in Flemish Brabant
- Interactive map of Linkebeek
- Location in Belgium
- Coordinates: 50°46′N 04°20′E
- Country: Belgium
- Community: Flemish Community
- Region: Flemish Region
- Province: Flemish Brabant
- Arrondissement: Halle-Vilvoorde

Government
  - Mayor: Yves Ghequiere (Link@Venir)
  - Governing parties: LINK@VENIR, ensemble LKB samen

Area
  - Total: 4.19 km^{2} (1.62 sq mi)

Population (2018-01-01)
  - Total: 4,760
  - Density: 1,140/km^{2} (2,940/sq mi)
- Postal codes: 1630
- NIS code: 23100
- Area codes: 02
- Website: www.linkebeek.be

Linkebeek (Dutch: [ˈlɪŋkəbeːk]; French: [linkəbek]) is a Belgian municipality in the Halle-Vilvoorde district (arrondissement) of the province of Flemish Brabant. The municipality only comprises the town of Linkebeek proper. On 1 January 2006, Linkebeek had a total population of 4,759. The total area is 4.15 km^{2} (1.60 sq mi), which gives a population density of 1,147/km^{2} (2,970/sq mi). It directly borders the Brussels-Capital Region and is part of the city's urban sprawl, contiguous with Moensburg (Uccle) – it was a component of the short-lived Arrondissement of Brussels-Periphery.

== Language and politics ==
The official language is Dutch with French facilities. In 1954, these special linguistic rights or "facilities" were given to Francophones, who then constituted nearly 40% of the population according to the 1947 census. Nowadays, Francophones make up the majority of the population. Francophones can request official documents from the local administration in French, but the official language remains Dutch. There are also primary and nursery schools teaching in French.

Since the 2012 municipal elections, the municipal council consists of 13 French-speaking councillors, led by Damien Thiéry (MR), and two Dutch-speaking councillors (elected under "ProLink").

Damien Thiéry (MR) was the acting mayor from 2007 to 2015. He was never appointed mayor by the Flemish government for having violated language law, as confirmed by multiple Council of State rulings. The French-speaking majority refused to propose anyone else as mayor. In October 2015 the Flemish minister Liesbeth Homans (N-VA) appointed Eric De Bruycker (ProLink) as mayor. This caused controversy, and the French-speaking majority in the municipal council demanded his resignation. When De Bruycker refused, the 13 French-speaking councillors resigned to provoke a snap election. An election was then scheduled for 13 December to elect 13 councillors; the mayor and the other Flemish councillor both remain in office. A few days later, mayor De Bruycker submitted his resignation. If accepted by Flemish minister Liesbeth Homans, he will remain as acting mayor. Prolink, the Flemish party of De Bruycker, decided not to participate in the election and called on voters to vote blank.

The 13 December 2015 snap election resulted in the status quo: the French-speaking list won all 13 seats. However, about 15% did not vote (despite its being compulsory) and about 13% voted blank.

== Twin towns ==
- Saint-Lambert-du-Lattay (France) since 1981
- (United Kingdom) Kenton (England) since 1996

== Famous inhabitants ==
- Herman Teirlinck, writer (1879–1967)
- Audrey Hepburn, actress and humanitarian
- Roméo Elvis, rapper and hip-hop artist
- Angèle Van Laeken, singer-songwriter and musician
- Jehan Frison (on French Wikipedia) (1882–1961), painter and engraver
- Rodolphe Wytsman (1860–1927), painter
- Juliette Wytsman (1866–1925), painter
