= Museum of Ixelles =

Art museum in Brussels, Belgium

- Musée d'Ixelles (French); Museum van Elsene (Dutch)
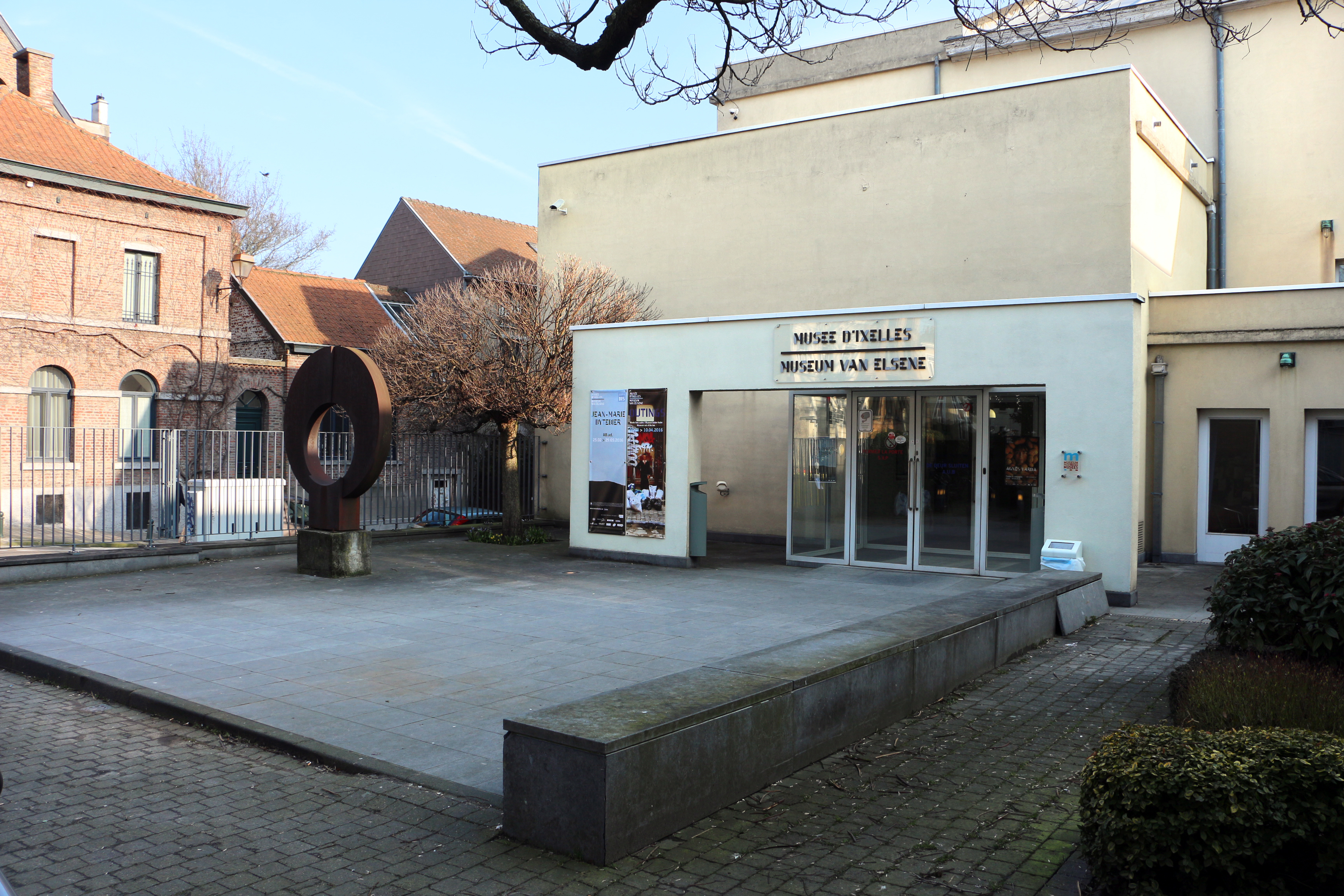
- Exterior of the museum
- Interactive fullscreen map
- Established: 1892; 134 years ago
- Location: Rue Jean Van Volsem / Jean Van Volsemstraat 71, 1050 Ixelles, Brussels-Capital Region, Belgium
- Coordinates: 50°49′54″N 4°22′20″E
- Collections: Impressionism, Neo-impressionism, Symbolism
- Curator: Claire Leblanc
- Website: www.museumofixelles.irisnet.be

The Museum of Ixelles (French: Musée d'Ixelles; Dutch: Museum van Elsene), also called the (Municipal) Museum of Fine Arts of Ixelles (French: Musée (communal) des Beaux-Arts d'Ixelles; Dutch: (Gemeentelijk) Museum voor Schone Kunsten van Elsene), is a municipal art museum in Brussels, Belgium, focusing on Belgian art from the 19th and 20th centuries. It is located at 71, rue Jean Van Volsem/Jean Van Volsemstraat in Ixelles.

== History ==
The Museum of Ixelles was founded in 1892 following a significant donation of artworks by the painter and collector Edmond De Pratere. In return, the municipality of Ixelles pledged to house and publicly display the collection. A former slaughterhouse was repurposed as a municipal museum, and after several adaptations, it officially opened on 31 May 1892. The new institution quickly attracted public interest, prompting the municipality to create a budget for art acquisitions. The collection soon expanded through further donations from patrons such as Léon Gauchez, Fritz Toussaint, Max Janlet, and Octave Maus, whose contribution included more than 200 impressionist, neo-impressionist, and symbolist works.

Around 1900, a concert hall designed by the architect Delune was added to the main building, which was later refurbished and expanded in the 1950s. Under the director Jean Coquelet from 1958, the museum gained a reputation for ambitious exhibitions and retrospectives while undergoing modernisation between 1969 and 1973, which saw the addition of a new wing, exhibition halls, and storage, transforming the former courtyard into a garden. Nicole d’Huart, the director from 1987, continued this trajectory, adding the adjacent concert hall in 1994 to expand the museum by 1,000 m^{2} (11,000 sq ft).

Since 2007, Claire Leblanc has overseen further growth, presenting major exhibitions and expanding the collection to over 13,000 works spanning Realism, Impressionism, Symbolism, Fauvism, Cubism, Surrealism, and abstraction, including masterpieces by Magritte, Delvaux, Picasso, and Toulouse-Lautrec. In 2018, the museum closed for renovations and an expansion, incorporating the adjacent building that was acquired in 2009, and is scheduled to reopen in 2025.

== Curators ==
The curators of the museum have been:

- 1902–1926: Emile Meunier
- 1929–1956: Jean-Joseph Hoslet
- 1957–1987: Jean Cockerel
- 1987–2007: Nicole d'Huart
- 2007–present: Claire Leblanc

== Collection ==
The museum houses a permanent collection of over 10,000 works spanning the 16th to the 21st centuries, with a particular focus on Belgian art from the 19th and 20th centuries. The collection includes paintings, sculptures, drawings, posters, and photographs, covering major art movements such as Realism, Impressionism, Neo-Impressionism, Symbolism, Fauvism, Expressionism, Cubism, Surrealism, and abstraction. Highlights include works by Magritte, Delvaux, Morisot, Permeke, Picasso, and Toulouse-Lautrec.

The museum's ancient art collection features Northern European and Italian masters, including landscapes, still lifes, and portraits. Its poster collection is notable for encompassing the complete lithographic output of Toulouse-Lautrec, alongside around 700 works by Belgian and European artists from the Belle Époque to the 1950s. 19th-century Belgian art is well represented, from Realism and Orientalism to symbolist and impressionist works, while the 20th-century collection reflects modernist movements and artistic experimentation, including CoBrA and pop art. Contemporary acquisitions are guided by an expert committee to reflect current trends and support emerging artists.

The museum periodically rotates works from the permanent collection and regularly lends pieces for exhibitions worldwide. It also maintains educational spaces, a library, and secure storage, ensuring both public accessibility and the preservation of its holdings.

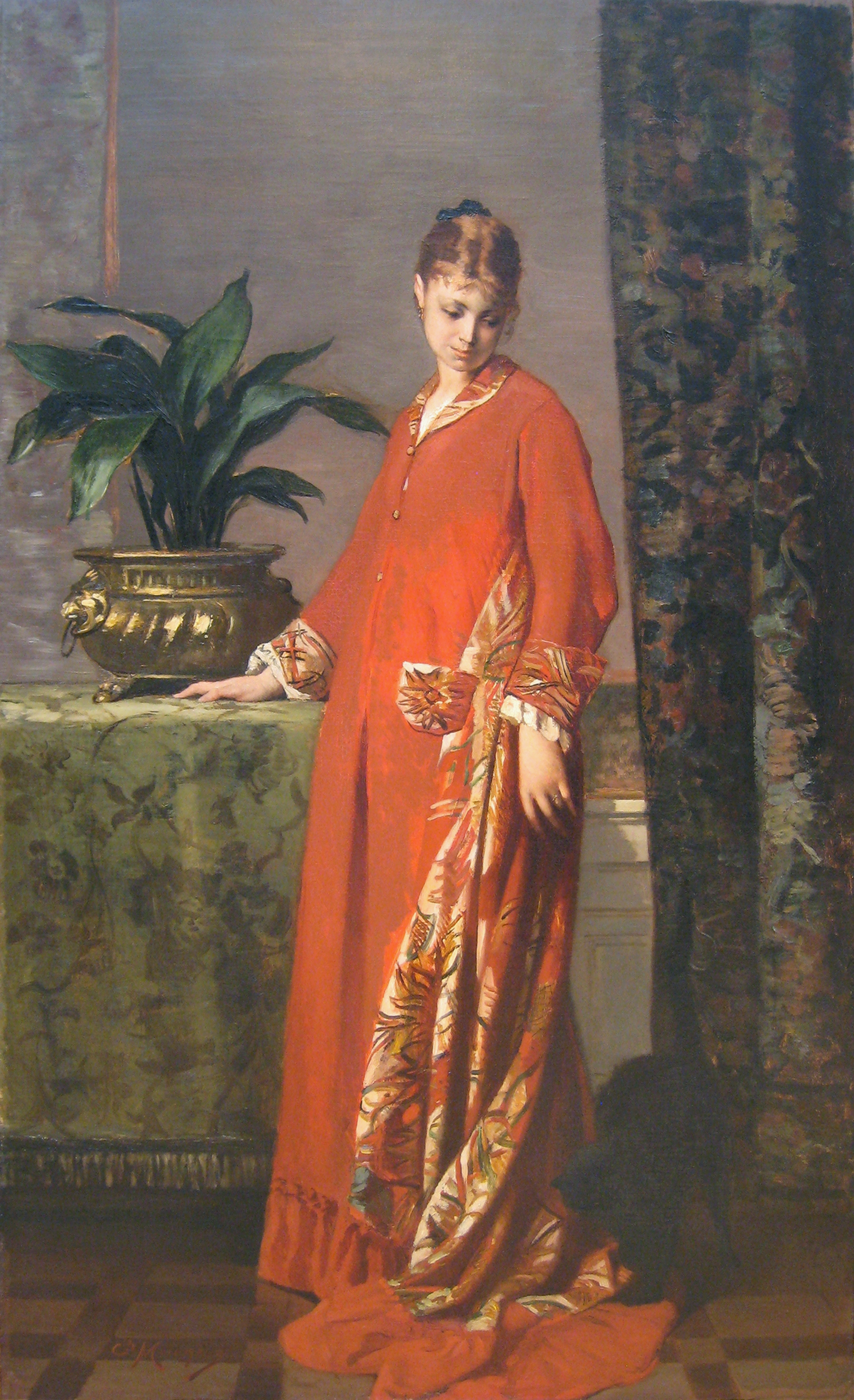
Portrait of Jeanne Meunier, Constantin Meunier

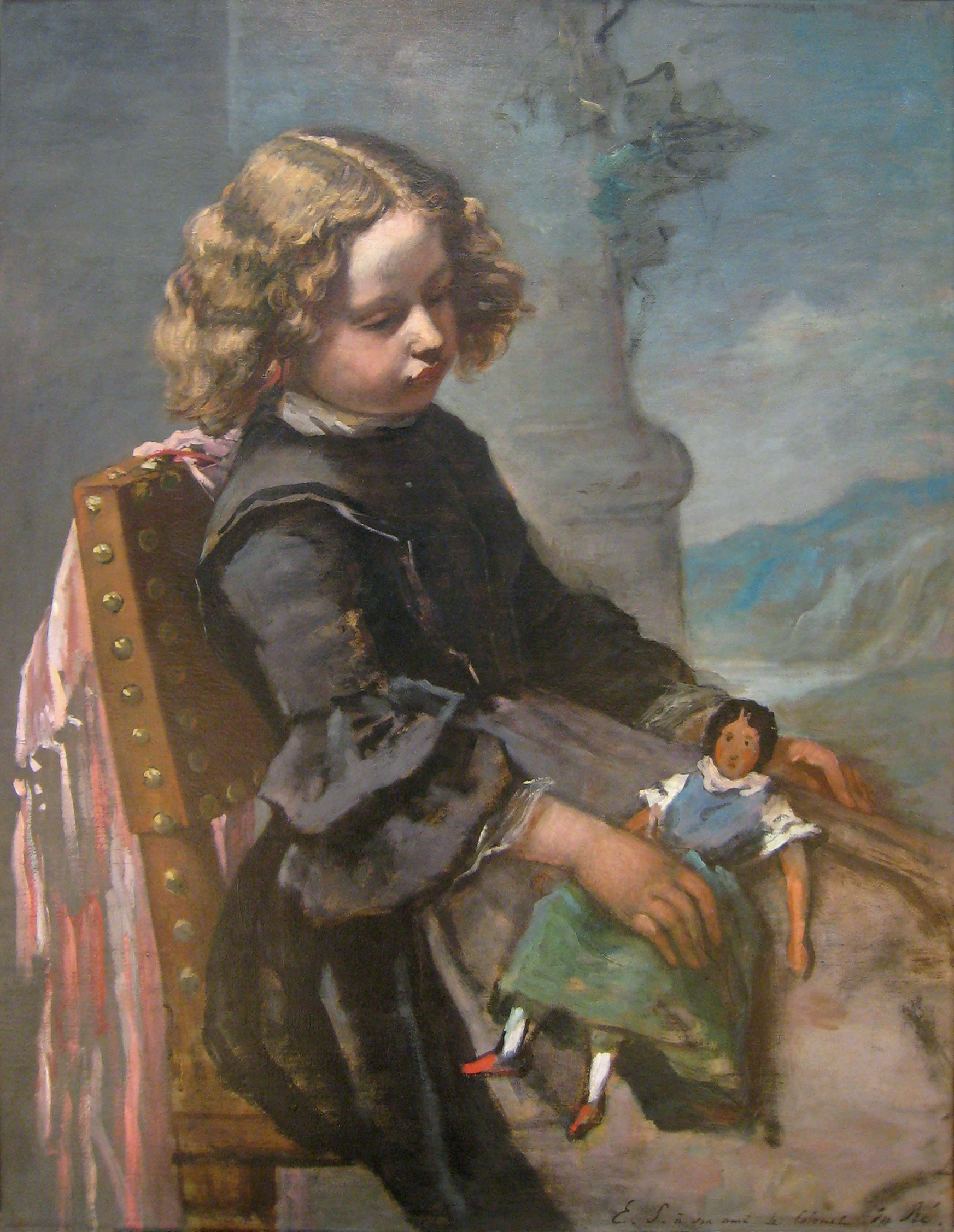
Child with a doll, Eugène Smits

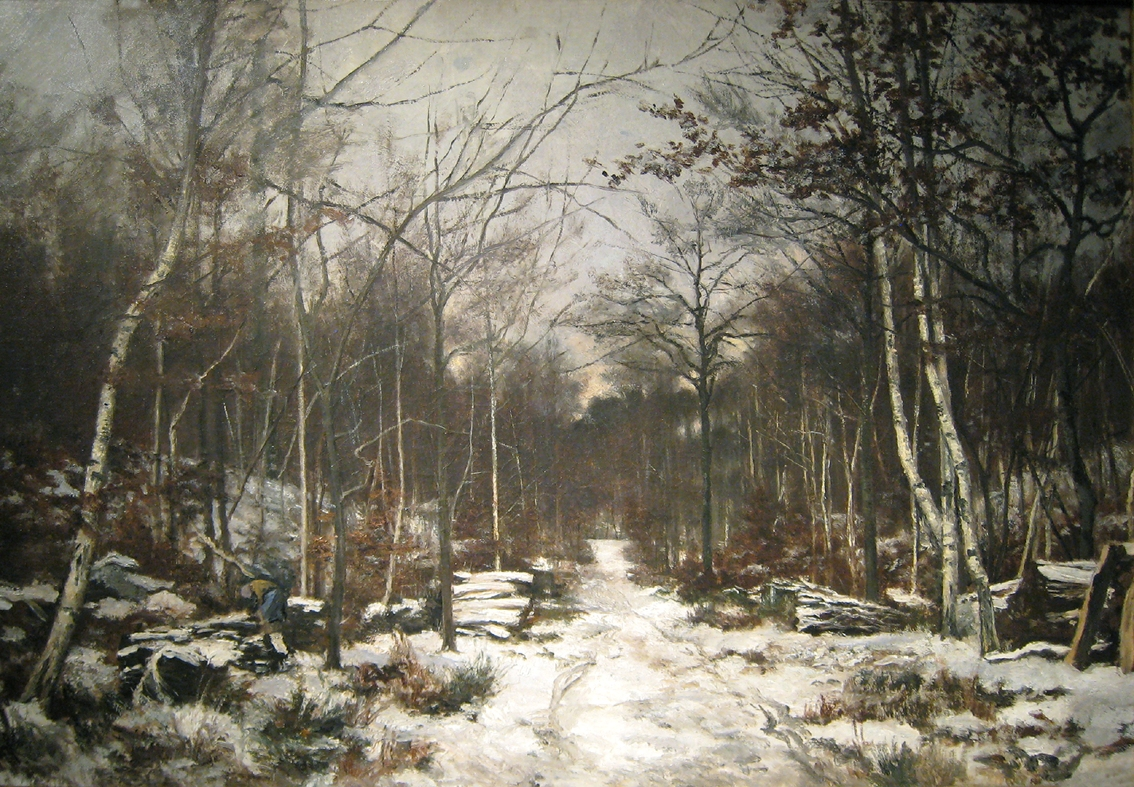
The Sonian Forest, Joseph Coosemans

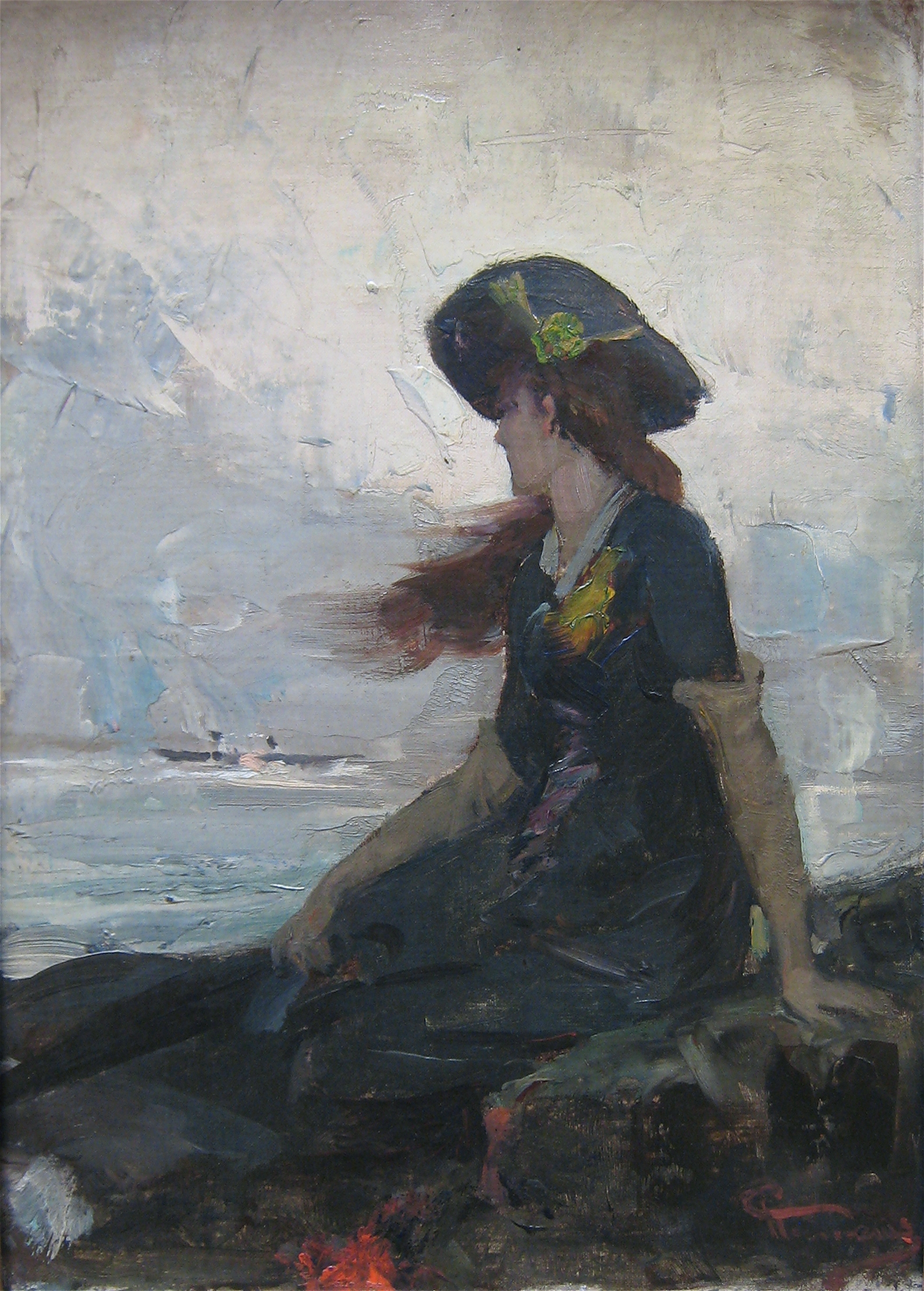
Young girl by the sea, Charles Hermans

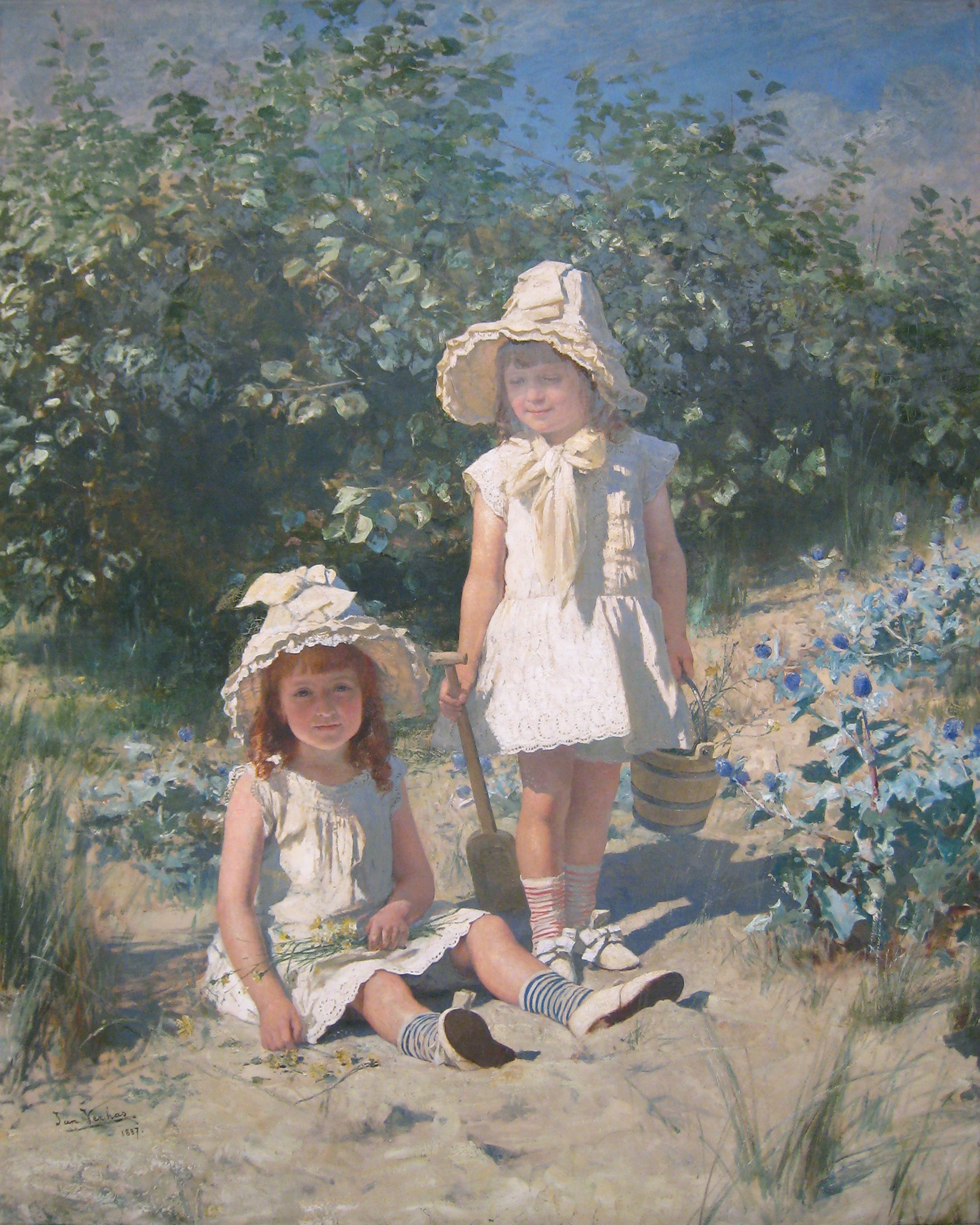
The young ladies van den Perre, Jan Verhas, 1887

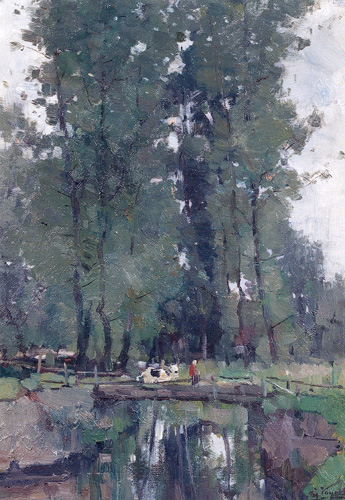
Senette in Ruisbroek, Guillaume Vogels

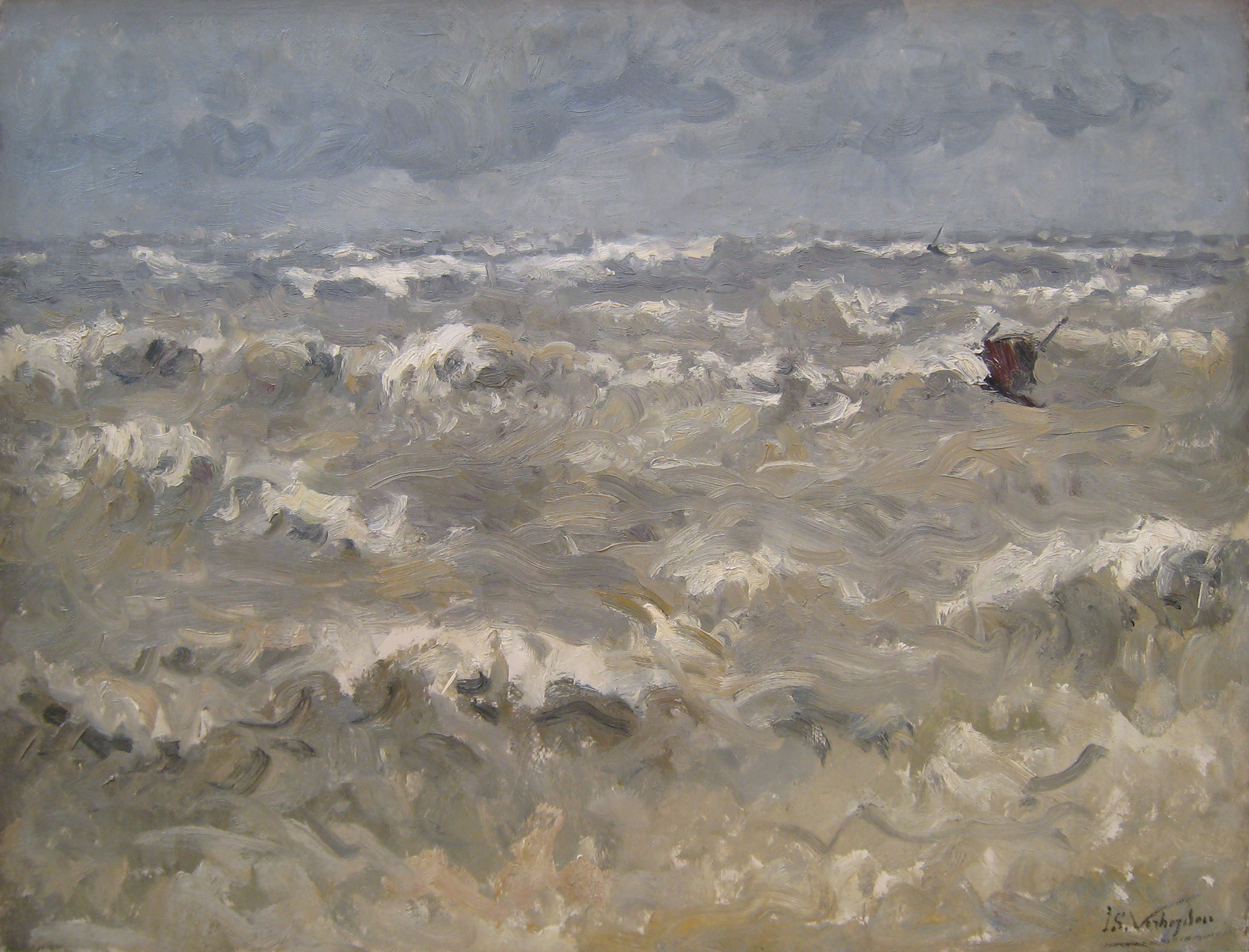
Turbulent sea, Isidore Verheyden, 1893

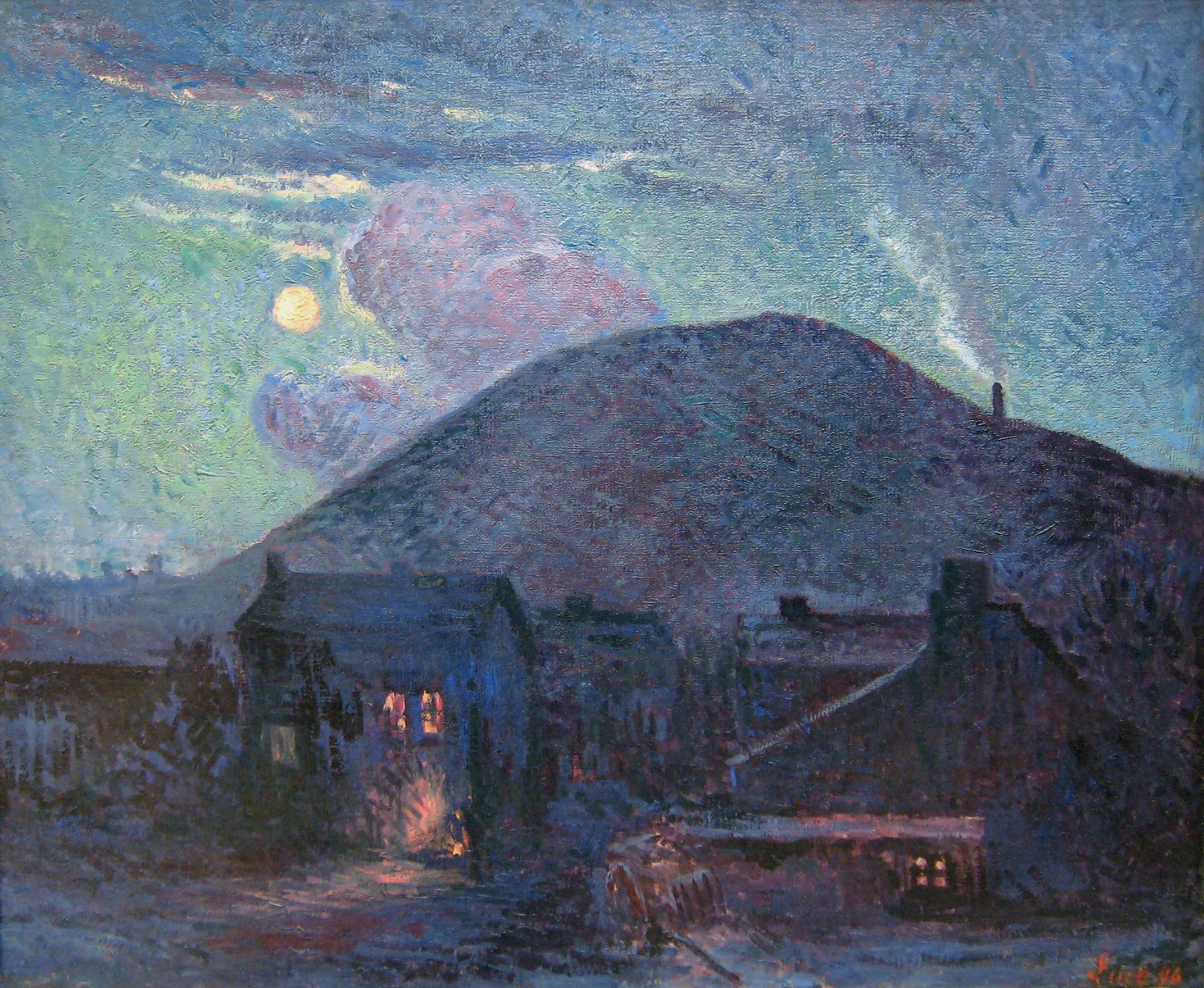
Terril of the coal mine, Maximilien Luce, 1896

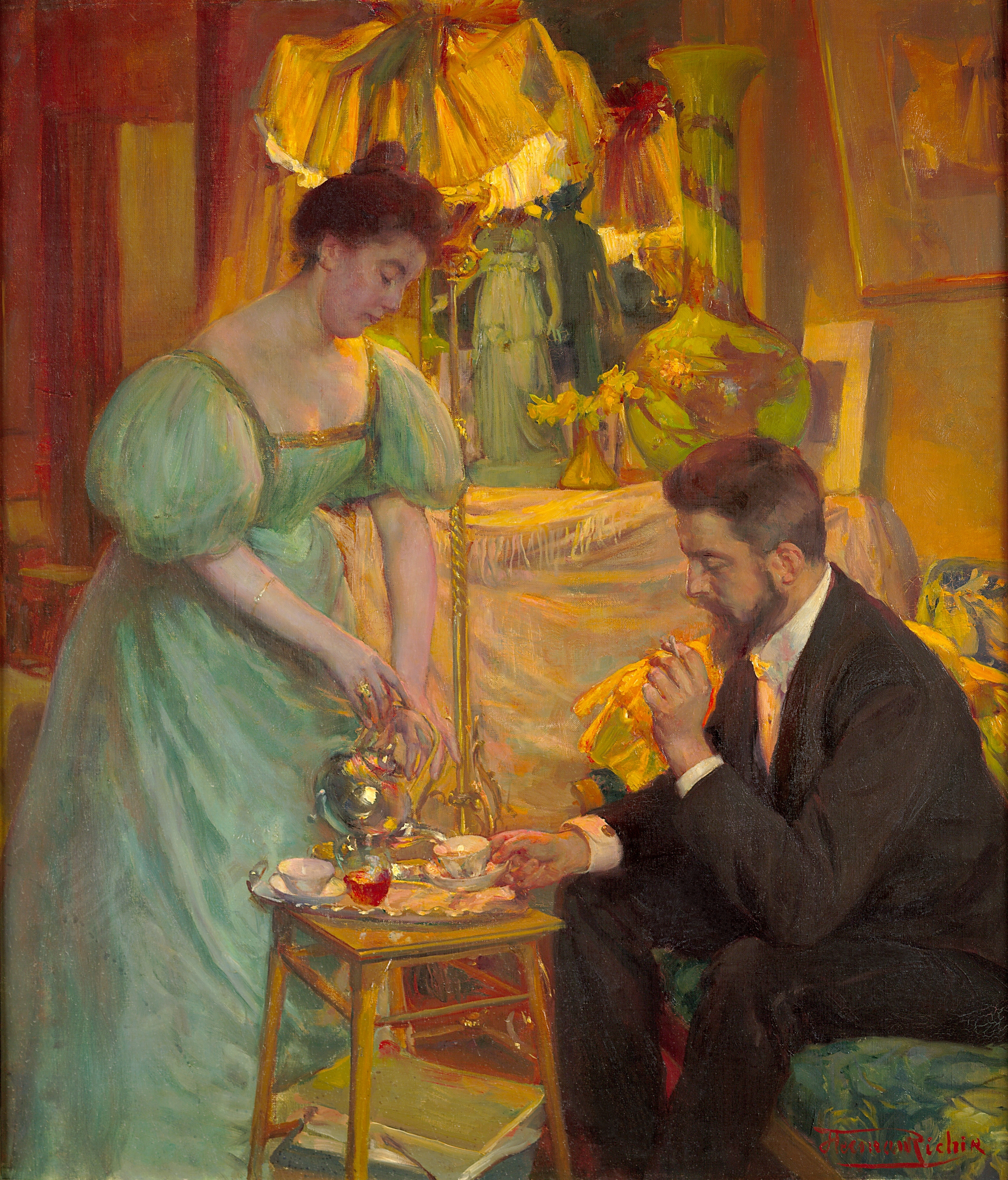
The tea (Portrait of Juliette and Rodolphe Wytsman), Herman Richir, c. 1898

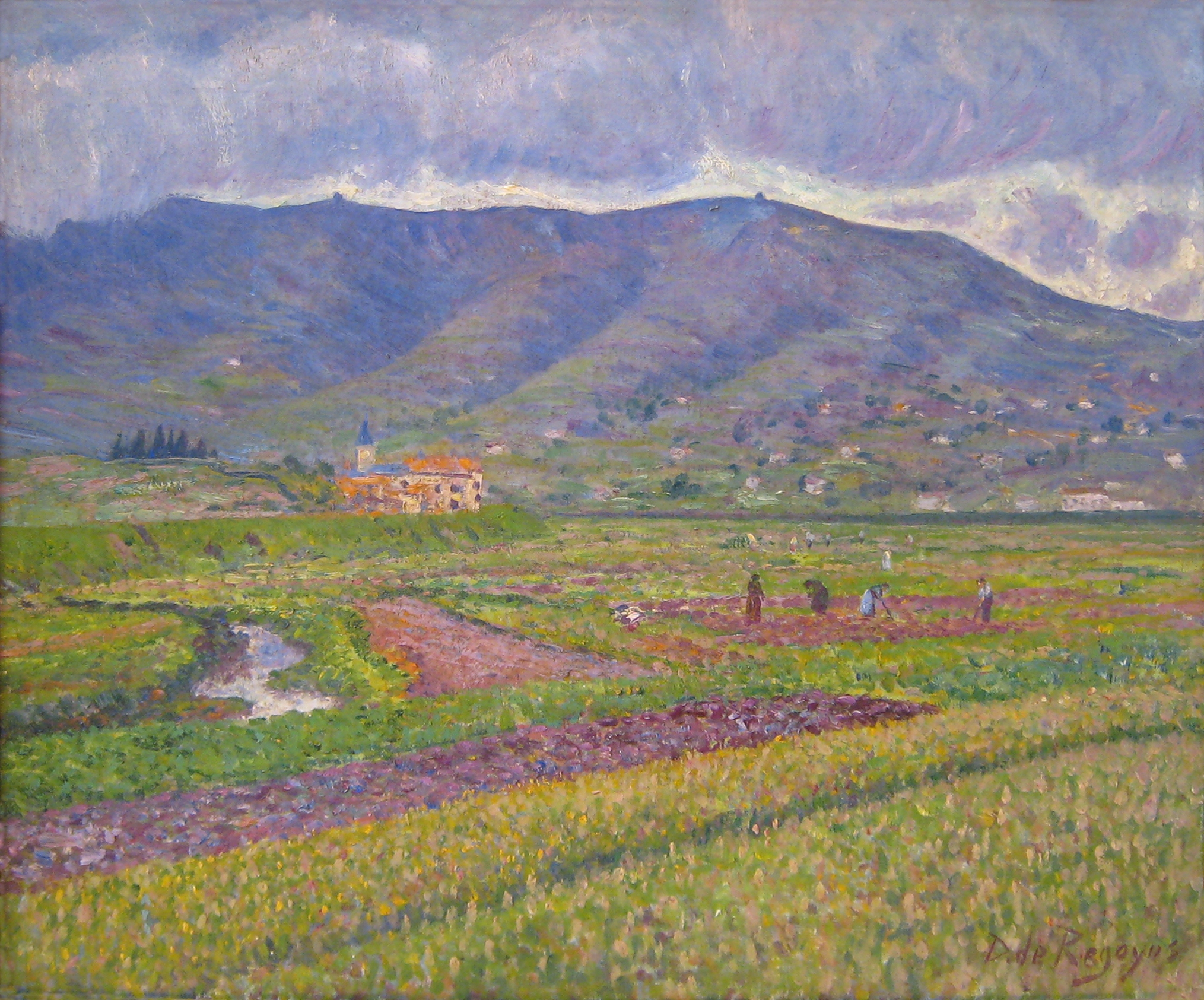
May rain. Basque Country, Dario De Regoyos, 1902

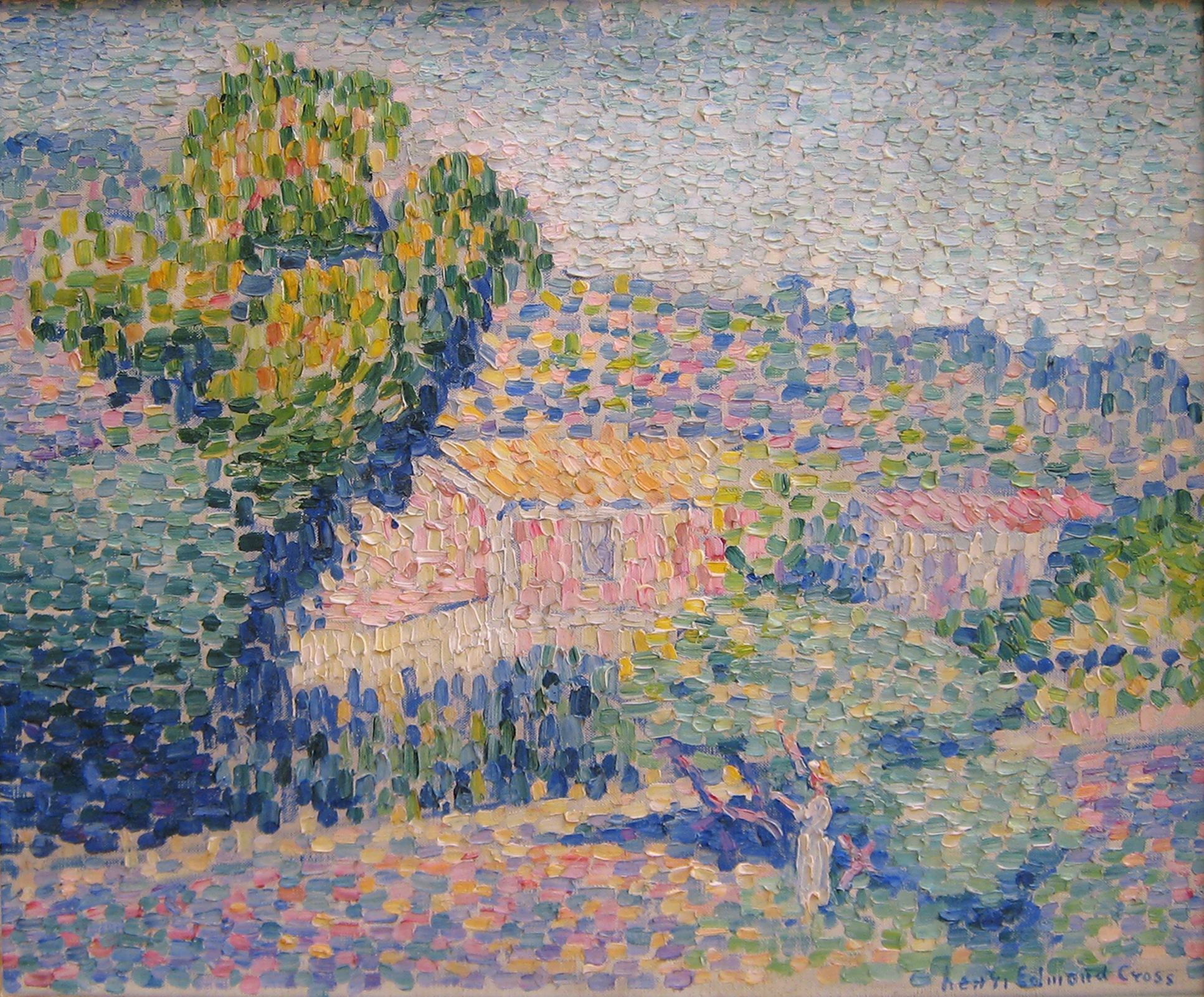
Pink house, Henri-Edmond Cross, c. 1901–1905

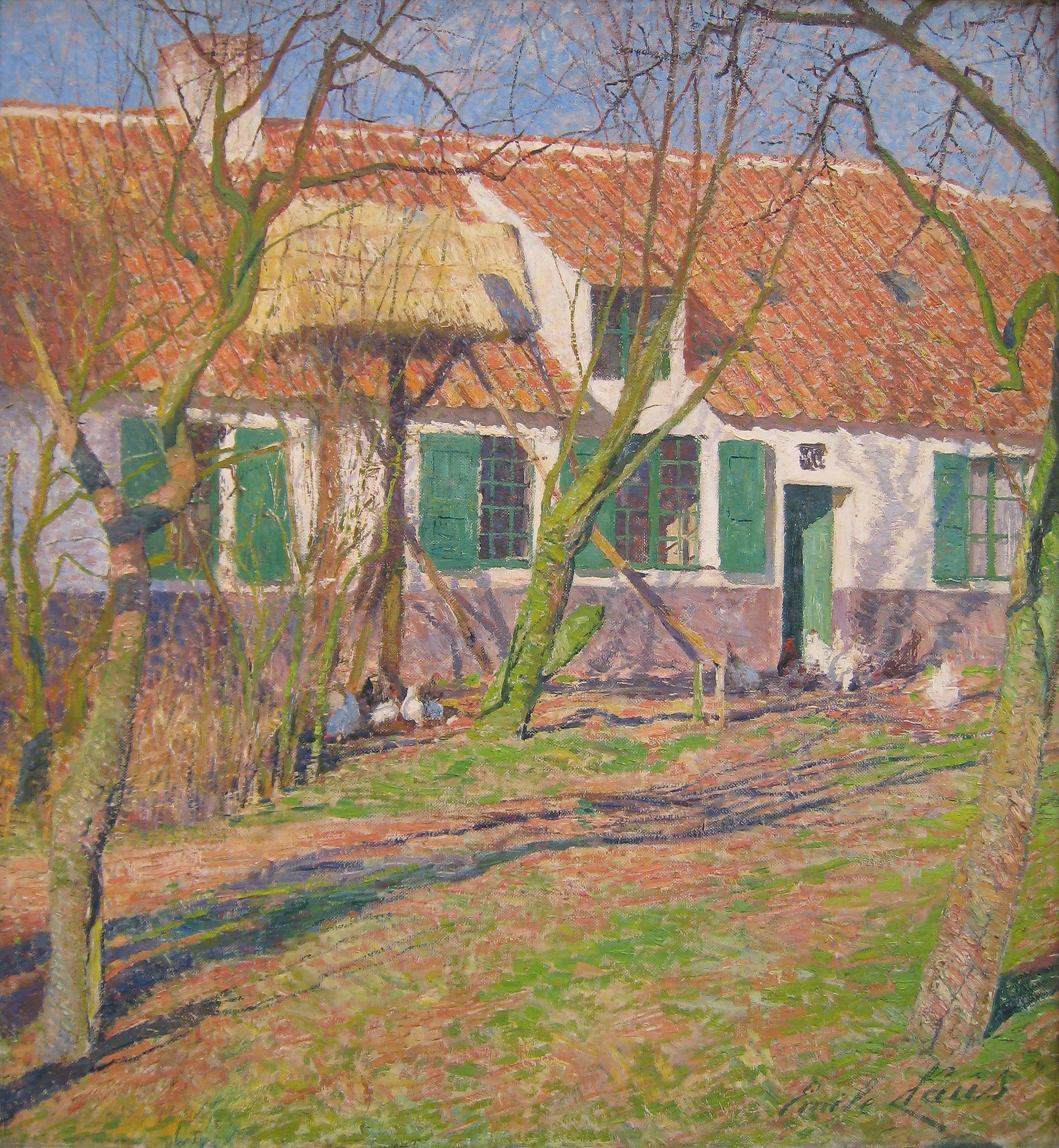
Farm in Flanders, Emile Claus, 1904

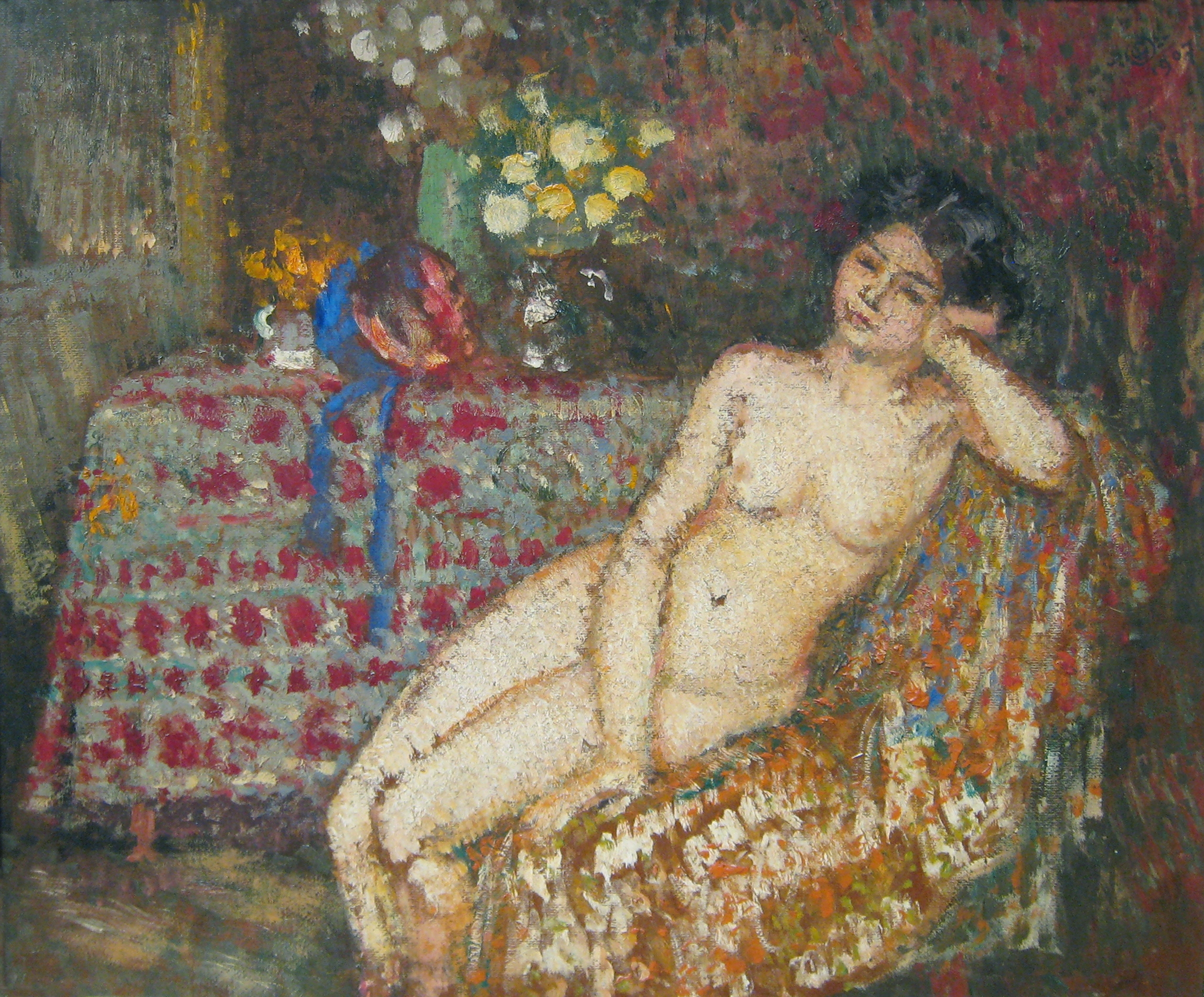
Nude, Georges Lemmen, 1907

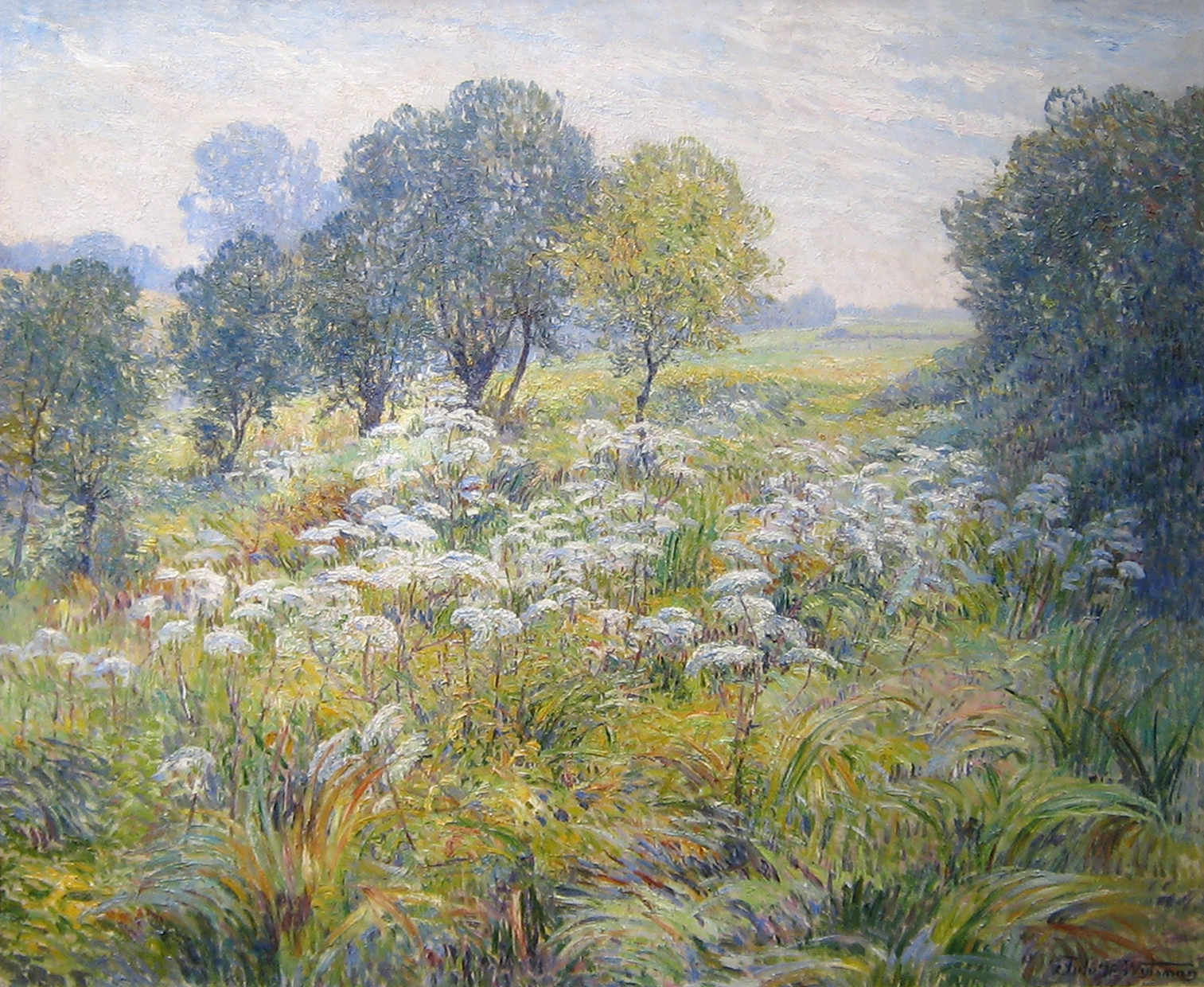
Spirea, Juliette Wytsman

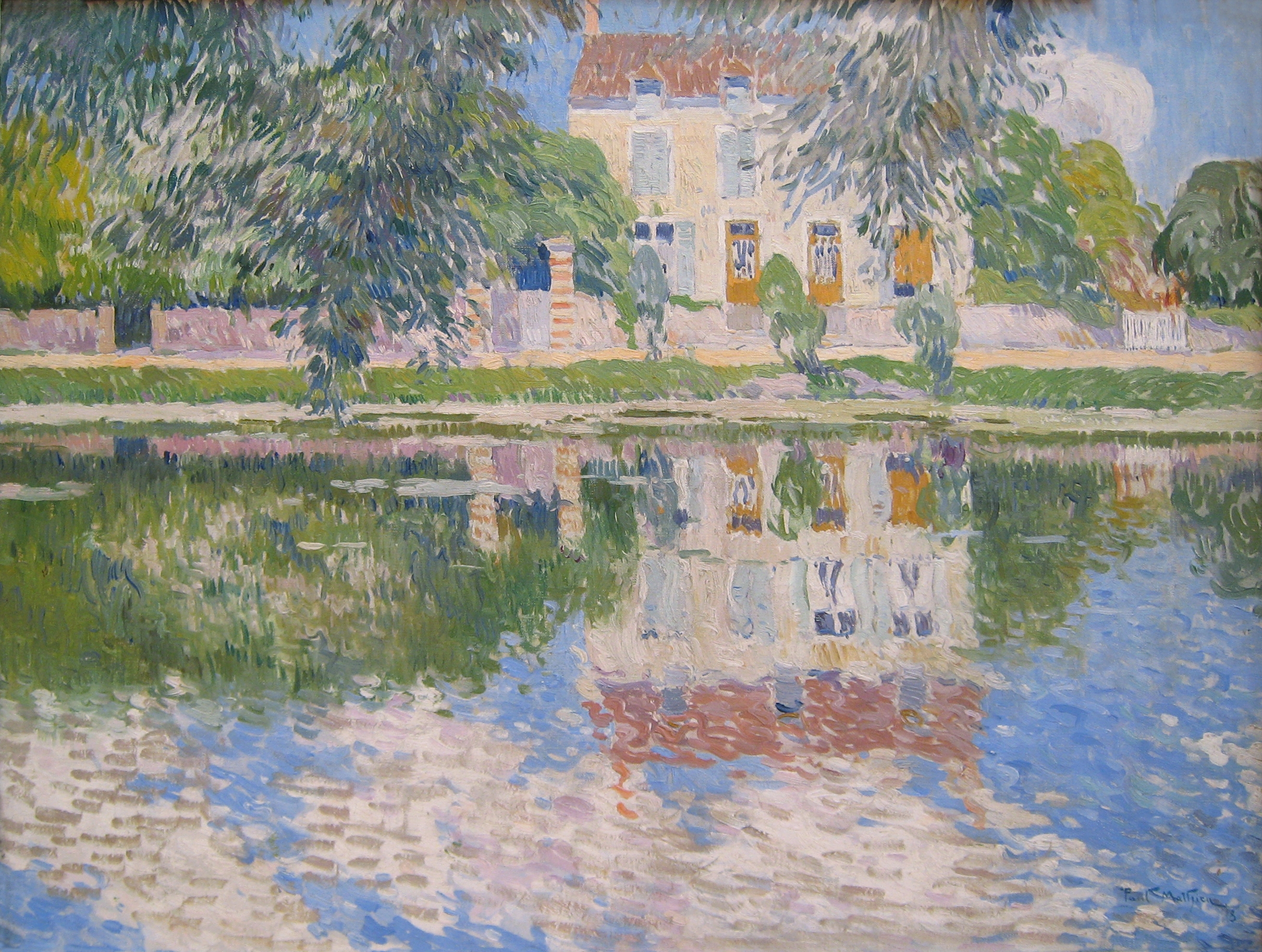
House by the water, Paul Mathieu, 1918

== See also ==
- List of museums in Brussels
- Art Nouveau in Brussels
- History of Brussels
- Culture of Belgium
- Belgium in the long nineteenth century
