= Jean Delvin =

Belgian painter (1853–1922)

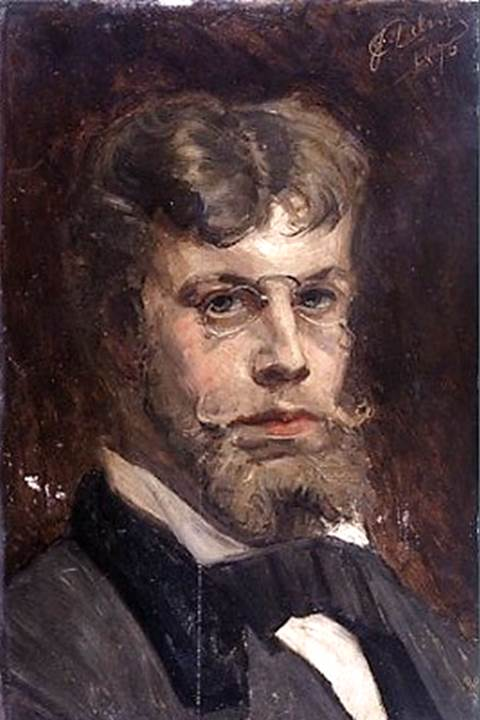
- Self-portrait (1876)
- Born: Jean Delvin; 1853; Ghent, Belgium
- Died: 1922 (aged 68–69) n/a
- Education: Royal Academy of Fine Arts of Ghent
- Occupation: Painter

Jean-Joseph Delvin (1853 – 1922) was a Belgian painter who specialized in scenes with animals (primarily horses).

== Life ==
Delvin was born in Ghent. He attended the Royal Academy of Fine Arts in Ghent, where he studied under Théodore-Joseph Canneel, and worked in the studios of Jean Portaels in Brussels. His fellow students there included André Cluysenaar and Jacques de Lalaing. Later, he undertook study trips to France and Spain. For many years, he shared a small workshop in a garden shed with Gustave Den Duyts.

In 1883, he was invited to join the secessionist group Les XX, along with James Ensor, Fernand Khnopff, Théo van Rysselberghe and several others, but he resigned only a few years later in 1886. He was also a member of La Libre Esthétique and Kunst van Heden (Art for Today) in Antwerp. At about that time, he began teaching at the Academy in Ghent and later became its Director (1902–1913).

Among his many well-known students there were Albert Baertsoen, Gustave De Smet, Frans Masereel, George Minne and Frits Van den Berghe.

== Gallery ==
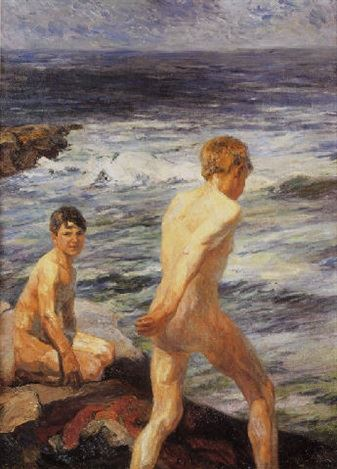
Bathers

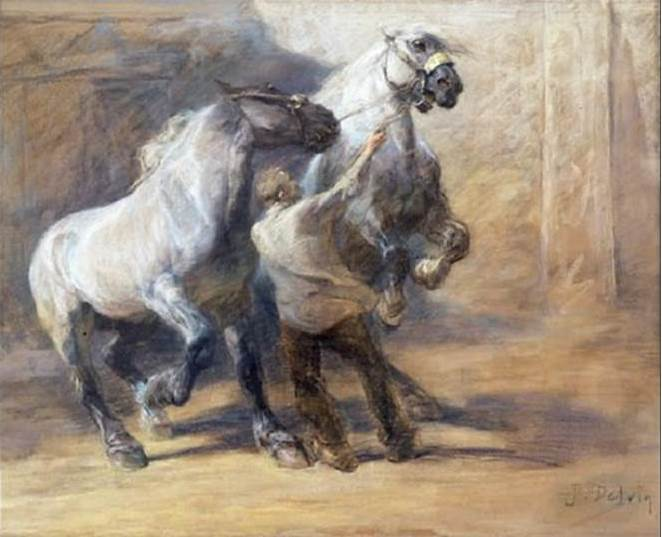
Horses

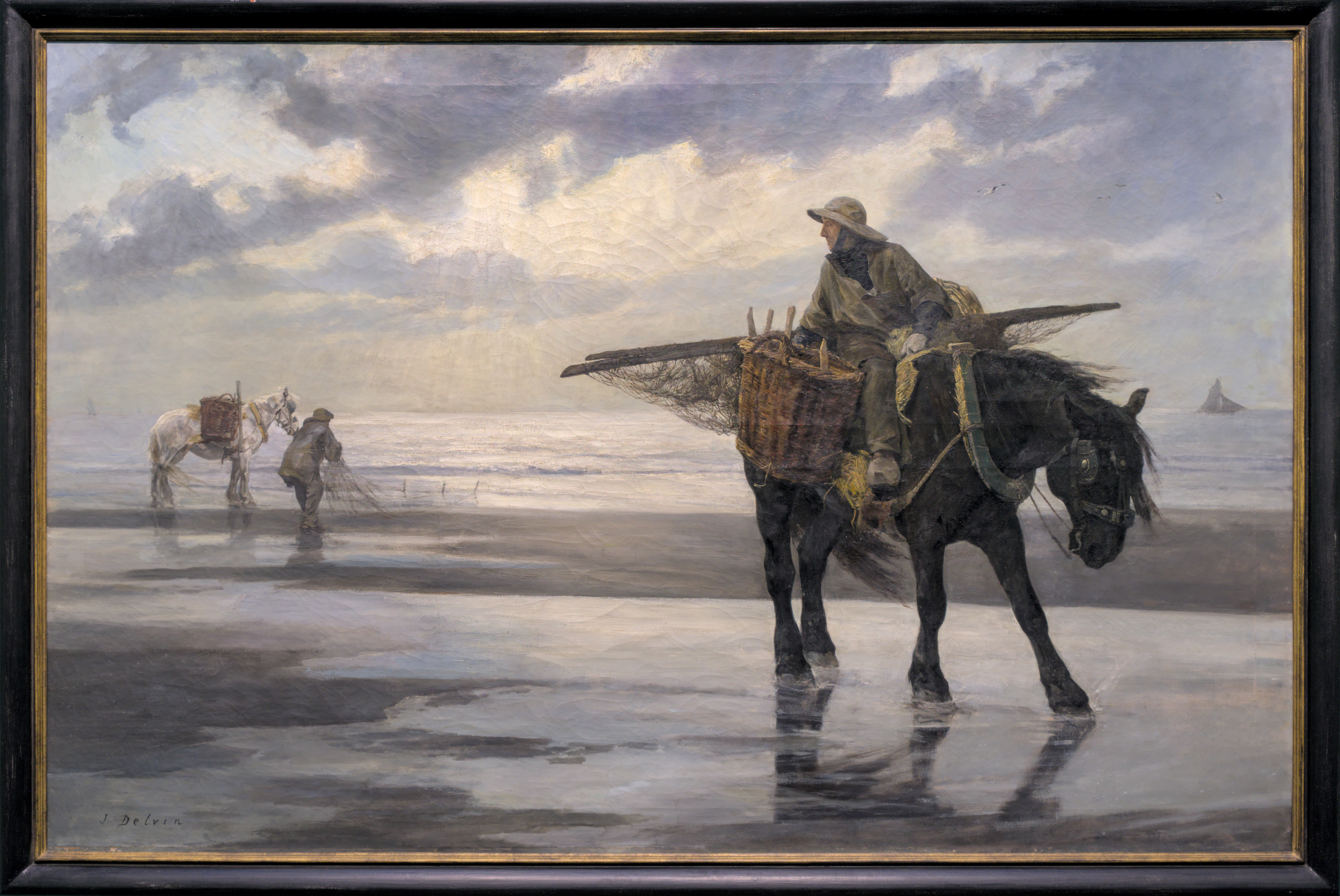
Shrimpers at Nieuwpoort

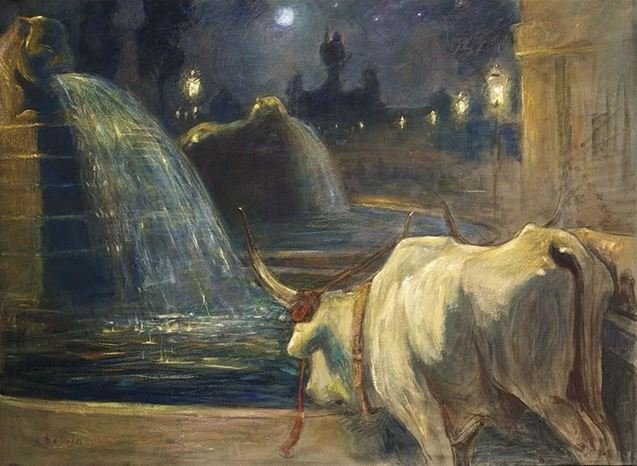
Ox Near a Fountain

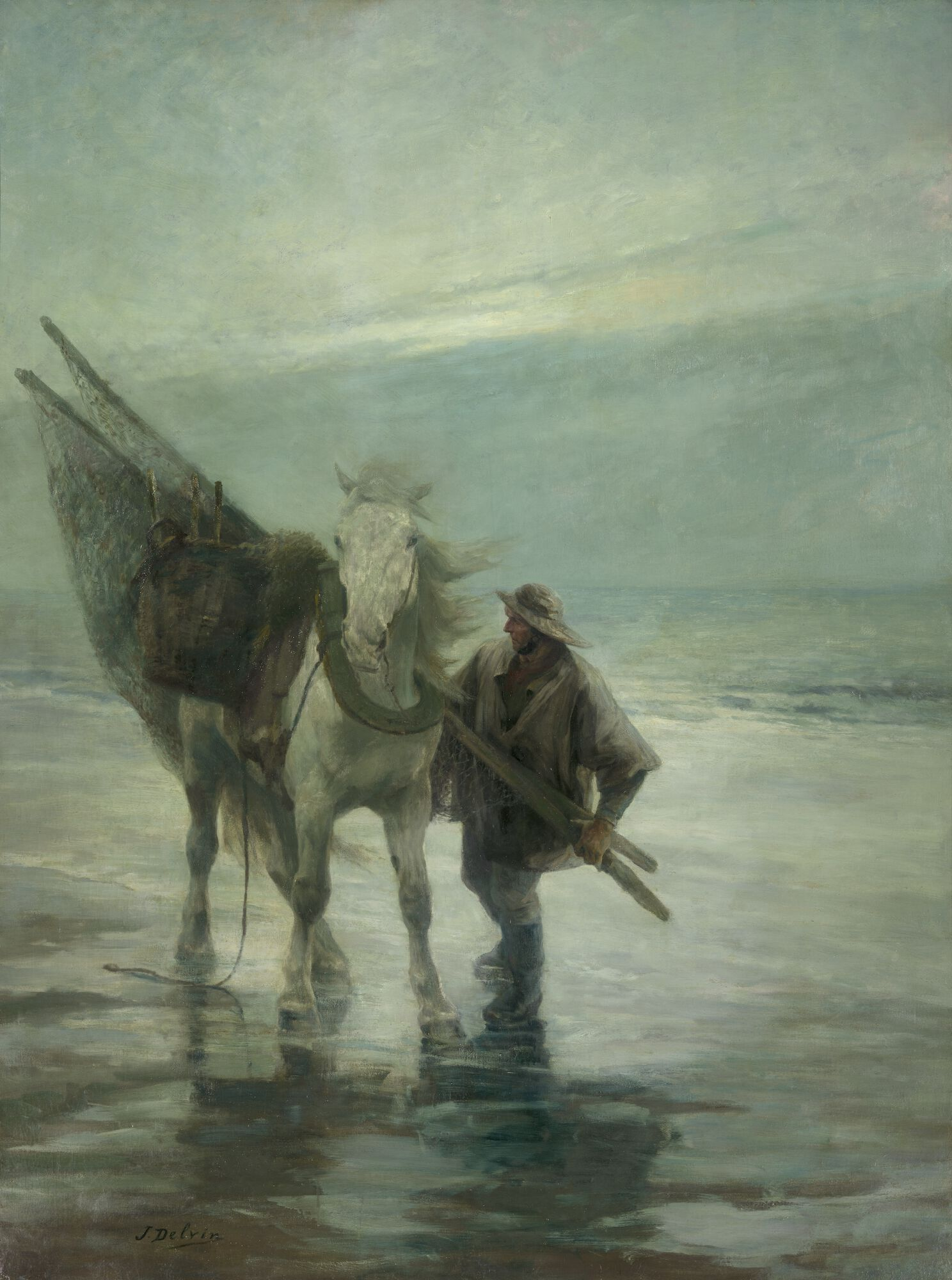
Shrimp fishermen

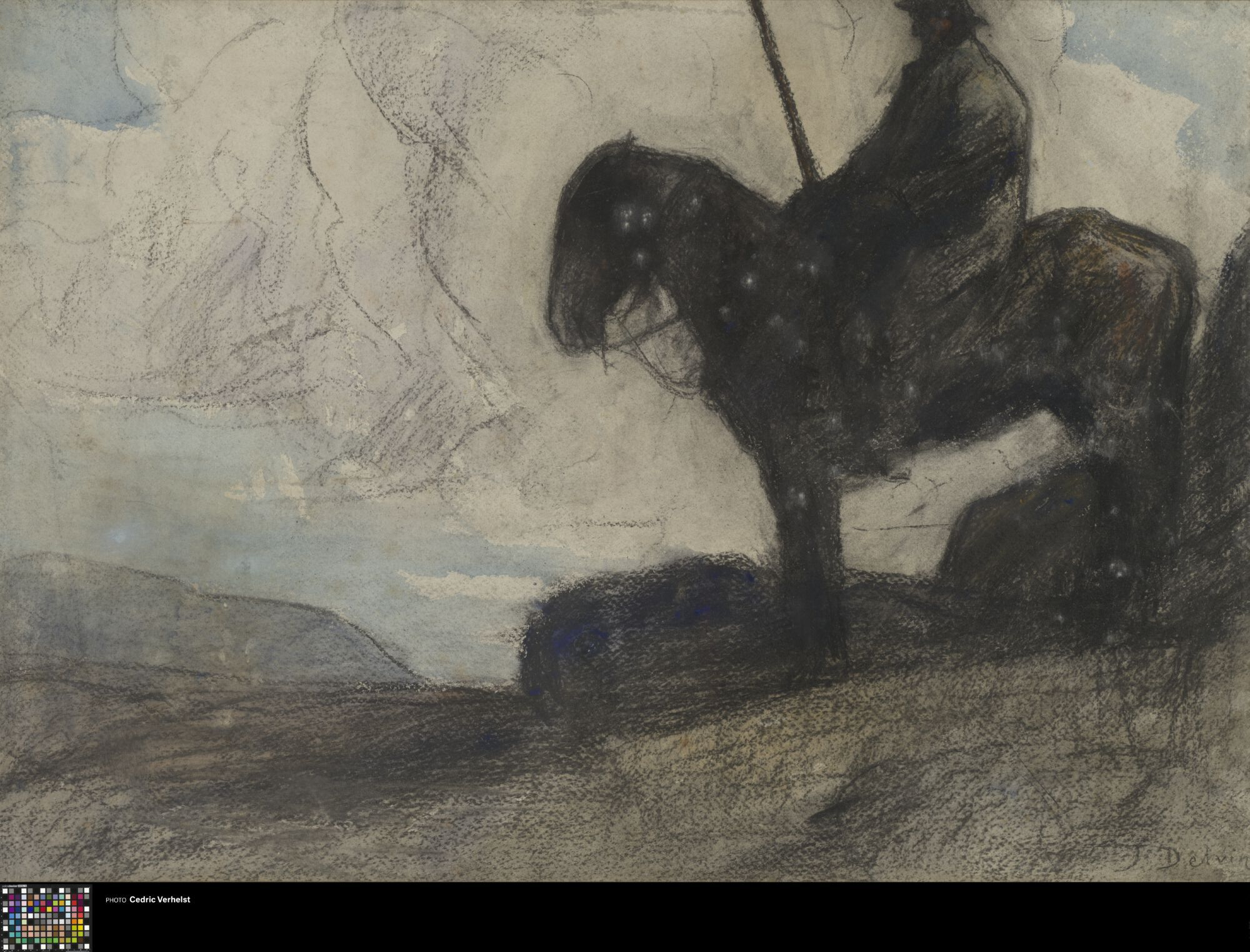
Fisherman on horseback near the coast
