= Juliette Wytsman =

Belgian painter (1866–1925)

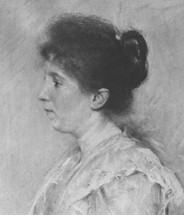
- Juliette Wytsman, in 1897 by Lucien Wollès
- Born: Juliette Trullemans; 14 July 1866; Brussels, Belgium
- Died: 8 March 1925 (aged 58); Ixelles, Belgium
- Known for: Painting
- Movement: Impressionism
- Spouse: Rodolphe Wytsman (m. 1886; d. 1925)

Juliette Wytsman (née Trullemans; 14 July 1866 – 8 March 1925) was a Belgian impressionist painter. She was married to painter Rodolphe Wytsman. Her paintings are in the collections of several museums in Belgium.

== Life ==
Wytsman was born as Juliette Trullemans on 14 July 1866 in Brussels in Belgium.

She first studied under Henri Hendrickx at the Bischoffsheim Institute in Brussels. She later worked in the workshop of Jean Capeinick in Ghent, where she specialized in the painting of flowers.

At Capeinick's workshop, she met painter Rodolphe Wytsman. He was a founding member of Les XX and introduced her to this circle of avant-garde artists. They married in 1886 and moved to Linkebeek, near Brussels, in 1892. During World War I, they fled Belgium and lived in Rotterdam in the Netherlands.

Wytsman died on 8 March 1925, at the age of 58, in Ixelles in Belgium.

== Painting ==
Wytsman was an impressionist painter of landscapes and gardens.

Wytsman exhibited her work at the Palace of Fine Arts at the 1893 World's Columbian Exposition in Chicago, Illinois.

The Royal Museum of Fine Arts in Antwerp, the Royal Museums of Fine Arts of Belgium in Brussels, and the Museum of Fine Arts in Ghent have paintings of Wytsman in their collections.

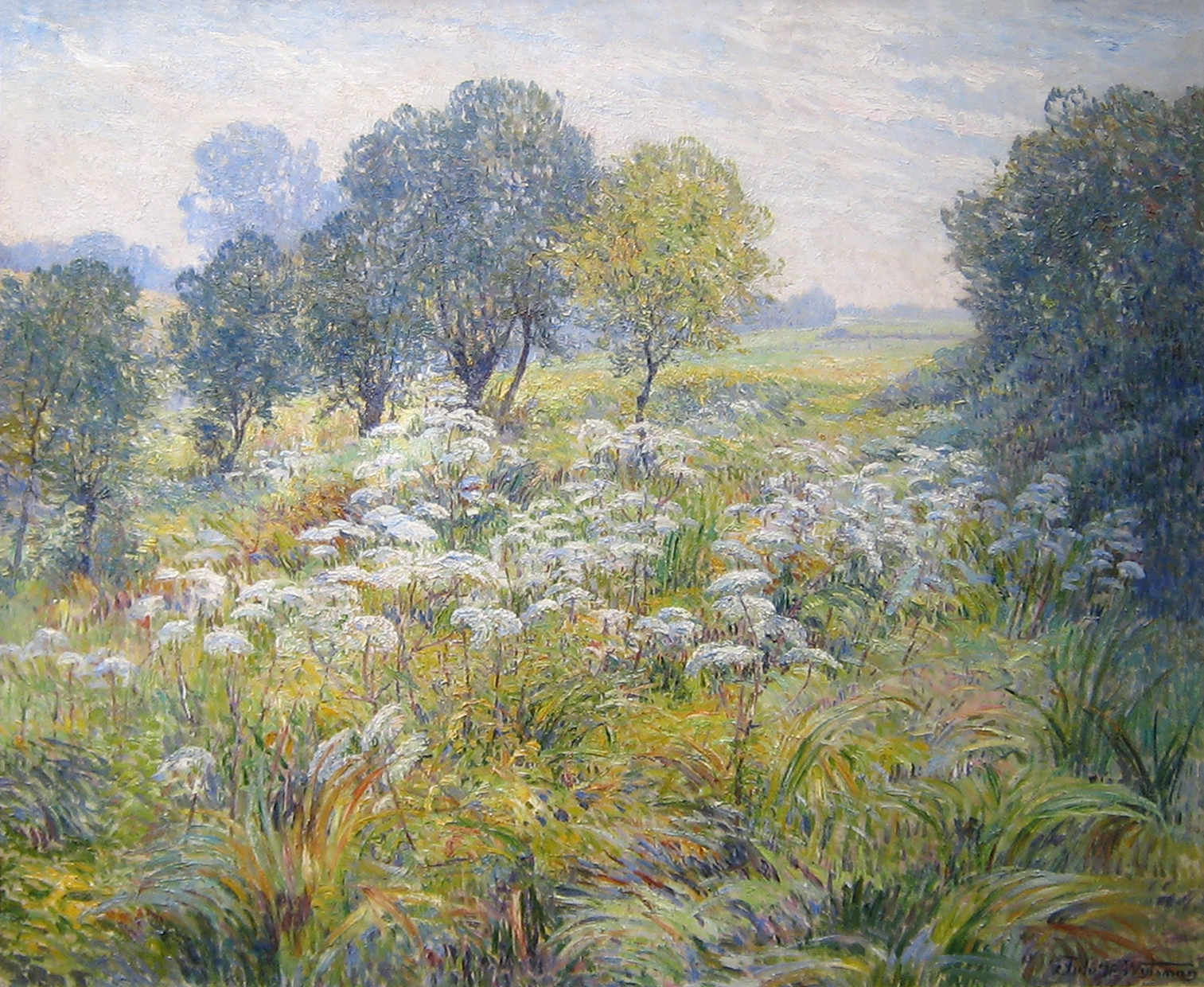
Spiraea

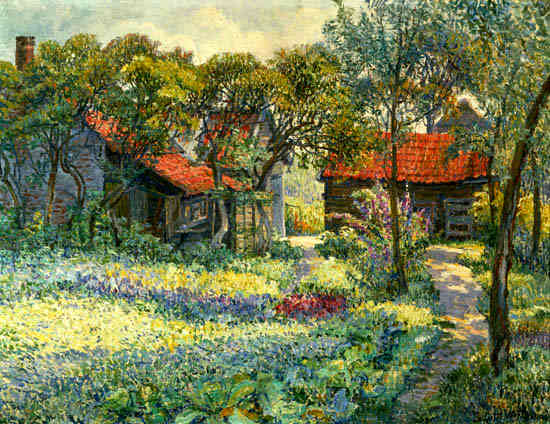
The vegetable garden

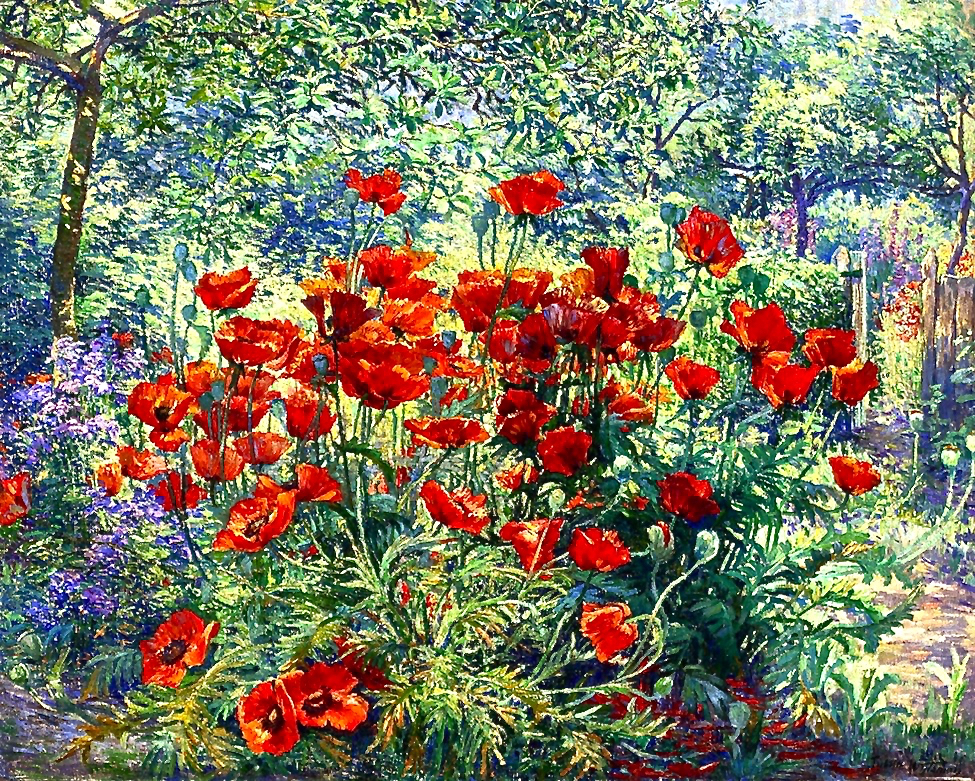
The flower garden

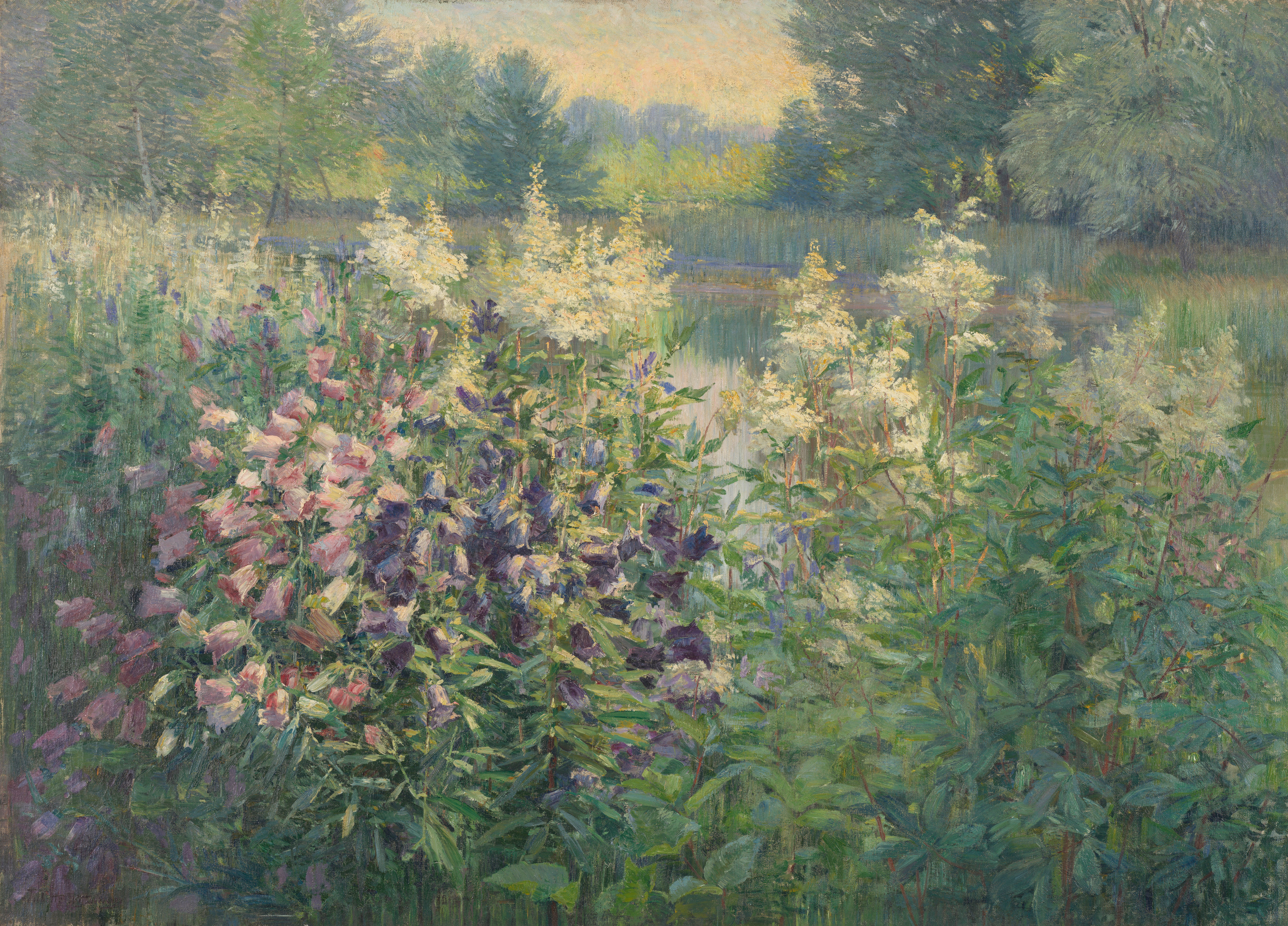
Landscape with bell flowers
