= Tompuri =

Tompuri is a Finnish surname. Notable people with the surname include:

- Elli Tompuri (1880–1962), Finnish actor, director, dancer, and author
- Timo Tompuri (born 1969), Finnish discus thrower
- Tuomo Tompuri (born 1976), Finnish mountain bike orienteering competitor
