= Mr. Chadd =

Educational website

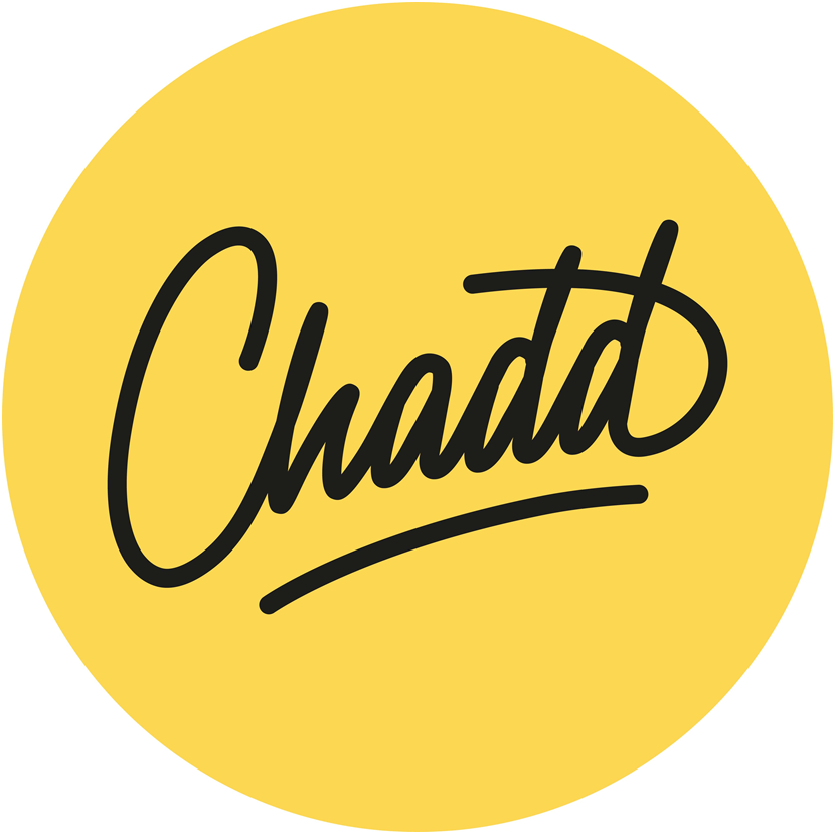
- Industry: Education
- Founded: 2015
- Founders: Kim van der Esch; Jan Gustavo Kuipers
- Headquarters: Groningen (city), Groningen, The Netherlands
- Services: Tailor-made homework support; Tutoring
- Number of employees: 8-10
- Website: mrchadd.nl

Mr. Chadd is a digital, on demand homework platform, founded by Jan Kuipers and Kim van der Esch in the city of Groningen, The Netherlands, in 2014. The company focuses on accessible and tailor-made homework assistance for high school pupils throughout the Benelux, via an online program and mobile application. With over 200 employees and 35,000 users, the company has seen a large growth over the past two years. On March 6th 2026, the company announced that it had been acquired by the Dutch publisher Malmberg.

== Digital homework assistance ==
Mr. Chadd is the first online, on demand homework platform worldwide. The program was started in 2014 by Kuipers & Van der Esch, after reforms in Dutch educational law made it necessary for high schools to offer each and every student the care and attention needed to be able to fully participate in the educational system. The educational program enables students to get on demand homework assistance where and whenever they need it.

=== Method of employment ===
The Mr. Chadd program works by creating an online link between carefully selected and specialized university students (coaches) and high school students. When a student is doing homework and cannot answer a question, the student logs into the Mr. Chadd website, posts the question in the specific course it belongs to (via text, image, or voice clip), at which point the coaches that are enrolled to that course (i.e. mathematics) see the question appear in their web browser or app. A coach accepts the question and is then able to answer it. The average time from posting the question to it being accepted by a coach is < 10 seconds, increasing the effective time a high school student spends on making homework.

== Data collection ==
Mr. Chadd collects data from high school pupils. Previously, the program educational book publishers had to rely on the periodical questionnaires, Mr. Chadd introduced real-time data from over 35,000 active participants. This made the program a helpful partner for publishers, and a co-creator of educational methodologies.

== Chadd Foundation ==
In 2016, the owners of Mr. Chadd founded the Chadd Foundation. With their slogan "The goal to life isn't living, it's giving", the foundation strives to provide children from sub-standard socioeconomical backgrounds with the educational tools to help them get ahead in live.

== Awards and press ==
=== Anner Awards 2016 ===
In May 2016, Jan Kuipers won the Dutch Anner Awards with the Mr. Chadd program. The award, which consisted of a monetary prize and free office space, was organized by the Anner Awards in cooperation with BusinessMatch Groningen. After the award, Mr. Chadd gained traction through press and media attention, increasing the visibility of the program throughout The Netherlands.

=== Accenture Innovation Awards 2016 ===
In October 2016, Mr. Chadd won the Accenture Innovation Awards 2016 in the category 'Skills to Succeed'. While nearly missing the popular vote after a large social-network campaign, the jury selected by Accenture lauded Mr. Chadd for its innovative ideas and groundbreaking potential when it comes to data-gathering and the possibilities of educational improvement. During the award ceremony, Mr. Chadd's social media team flooded Twitter with comments about the Award show, making the hashtag #AIA16 a top 10 trending topic in The Netherlands.
