= Homework =

Educational practice

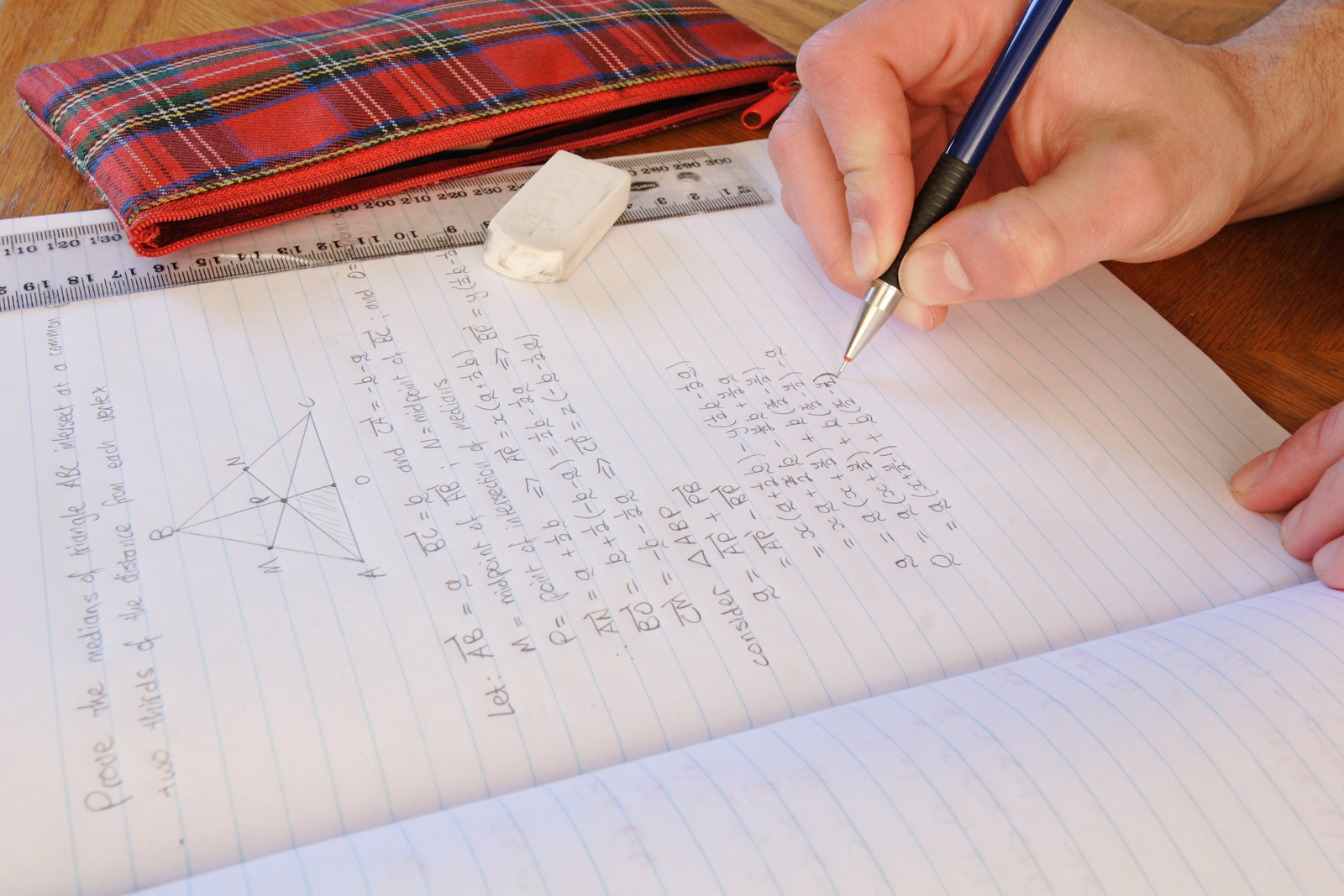
A student doing geometry homework

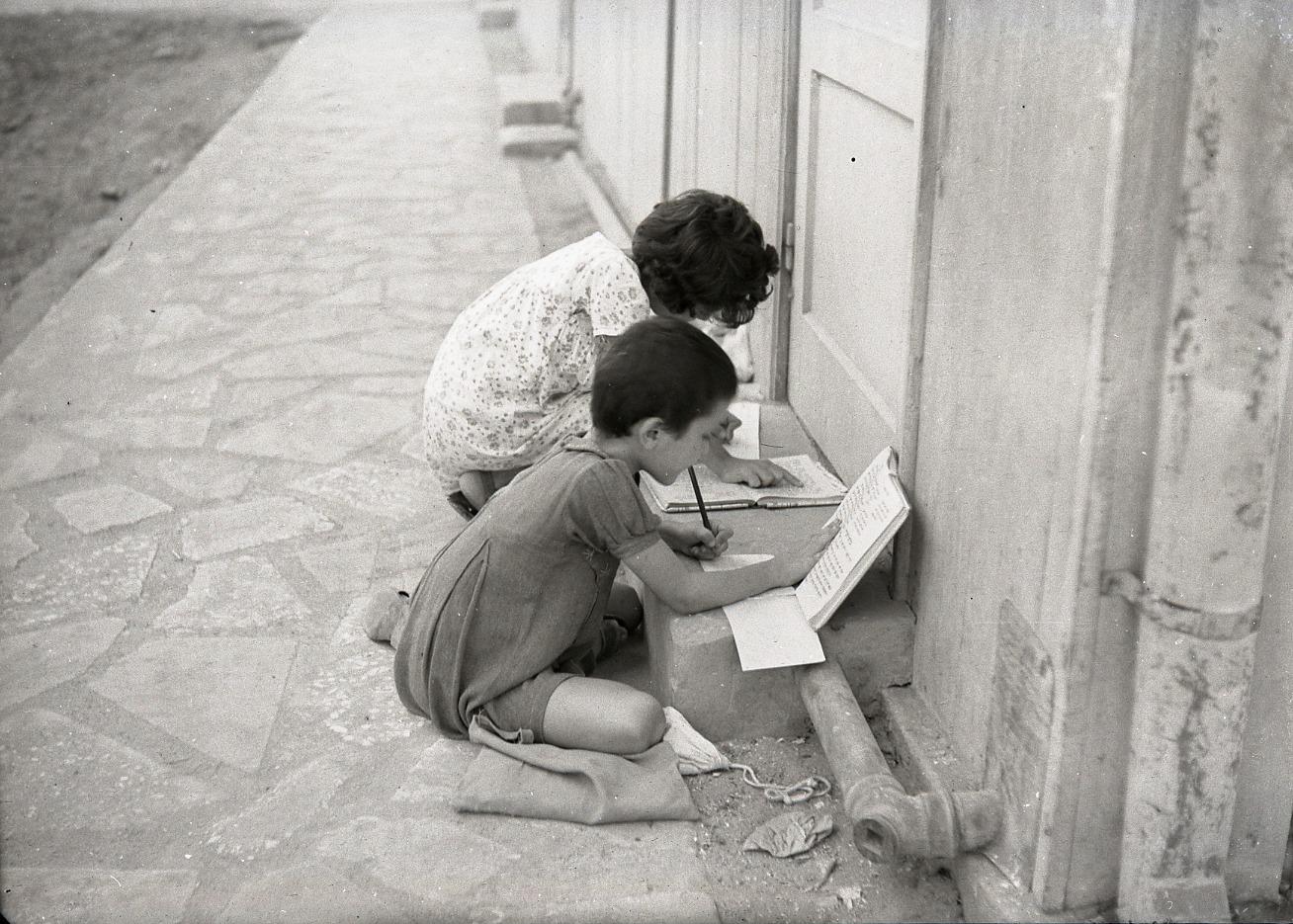
Children preparing homework on the street, Tel Aviv, 1954

Homework is a set of tasks assigned to students by their teachers to be completed at home. Common homework assignments may include required reading, a writing or typing project, math problems to be completed, information to be reviewed before a test, or other skills to be practiced.

The effects of homework are debated. Generally speaking, homework does not improve academic performance among young children. Homework may improve academic skills among older students, especially lower-achieving students. However, homework also creates stress for students and parents, and reduces the amount of time that students can spend in other activities.

== Purposes ==
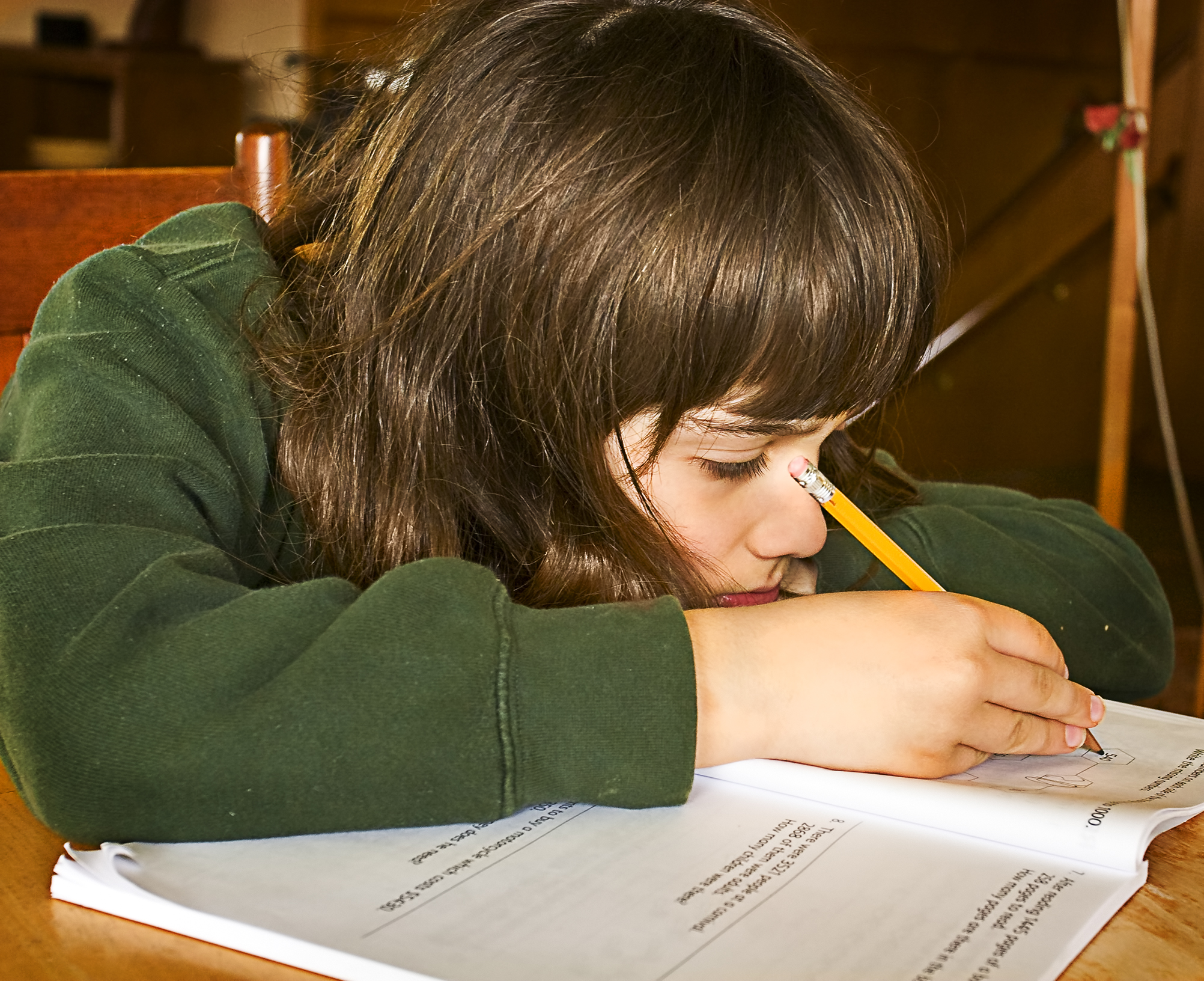
A child completing their homework

The basic objectives of assigning homework to students often align with schooling in general. However, teachers have many purposes for assigning homework, including:

- reinforcing skills taught in class
- extending skills to new situations
- preparing for future class lessons
- engaging students in active learning
- developing time management and study skills
- promoting parent-student communications
- encouraging collaboration between students
- fulfilling school/district policies
- demonstrating a rigorous school program to others
- punishing a student or a class

== Effects ==
=== Academic performance ===
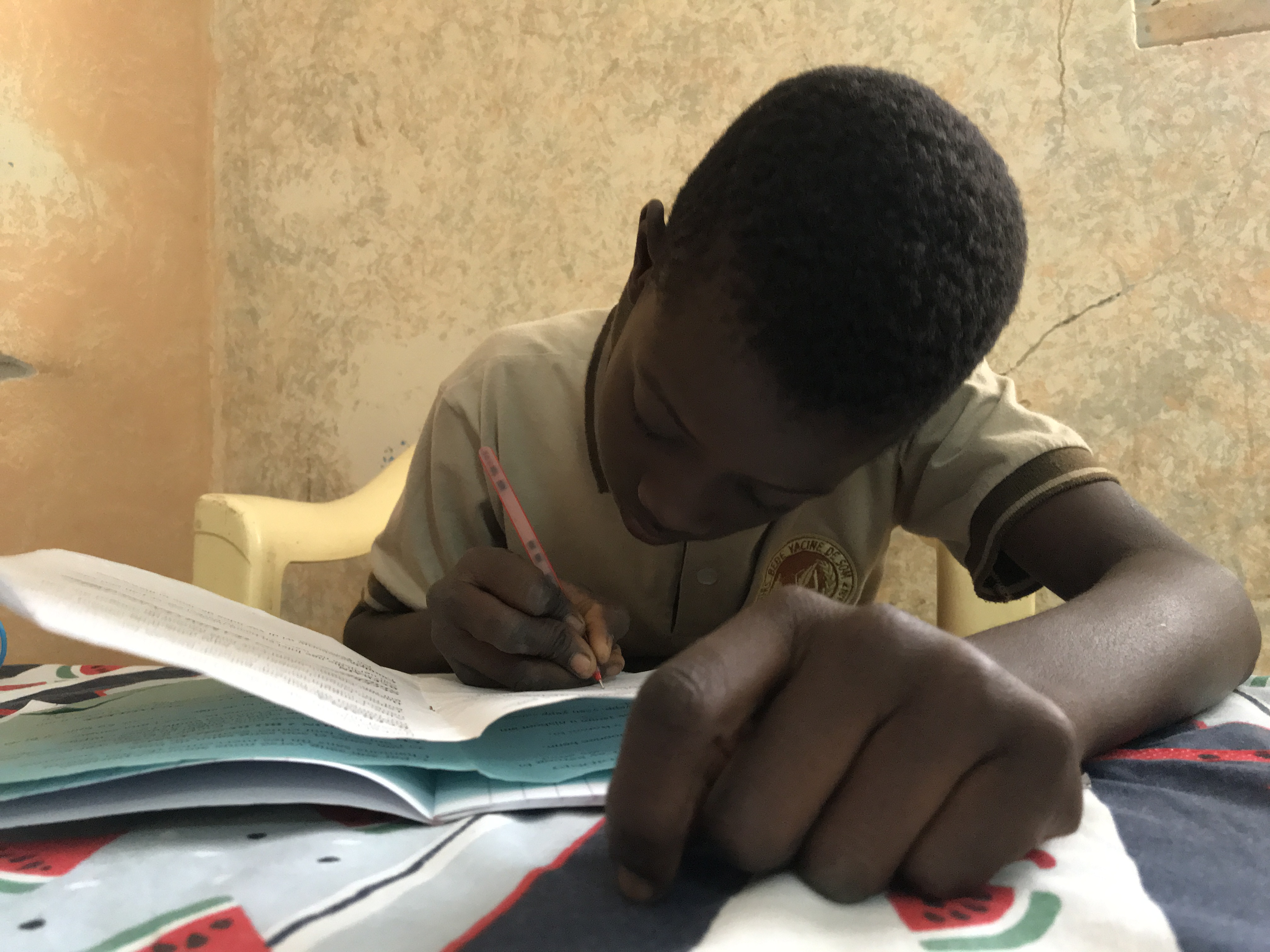
Senegalese child doing homework

Homework research dates back to the early 1900s. However, no consensus exists on the general effectiveness on homework. Results of homework studies vary based on multiple factors, such as the age group of those studied and the measure of academic performance.

Younger students who spend more time on homework generally have slightly worse, or the same academic performance, as those who spend less time on homework. Homework has not been shown to improve academic achievements for grade school students. Proponents claim that assigning homework to young children helps them learn good study habits. No research has ever been conducted to determine whether this claim has any merit.

Among teenagers, students who spend more time on homework generally have higher grades, and higher test scores than students who spend less time on homework. Large amounts of homework cause students' academic performance to worsen, even among older students. Students who are assigned homework in middle and high school score somewhat better on standardized tests, but the students who have more than 90 minutes of homework a day in middle school or more than two hours in high school score worse.

Low-achieving students receive more benefit from doing homework than high-achieving students. However, school teachers commonly assign less homework to the students who need it most, and more homework to the students who are performing well. In past centuries, homework was a cause of academic failure: when school attendance was optional, students would drop out of school entirely if they were unable to keep up with the homework assigned.

=== Non-academic ===
The amount of homework given does not necessarily affect students' attitudes towards homework and various other aspects of school.

Epstein (1988) found a near-zero correlation between the amount of homework and parents' reports on how well their elementary school students behaved. Vazsonyi & Pickering (2003) studied 809 adolescents in American high schools, and found that, using the Normative Deviance Scale as a model for deviance, the correlation was r = 0.28 for white students, and r = 0.24 for African-American students. For all three of the correlations, higher values represent a higher correlation between time spent on homework and poor conduct.

Bempechat (2004) says that homework develops students' motivation and study skills. In a single study, parents and teachers of middle school students believed that homework improved students' study skills and personal responsibility skills. Their students were more likely to have negative perceptions about homework and were less likely to ascribe the development of such skills to homework. Leone & Richards (1989) found that students generally had negative emotions when completing homework and reduced engagement compared to other activities.

=== Busy work ===
The intention of homework is to further test students' knowledge at home. However, there is a line between productive work and busy work. Karin Chenoweth provides an example of a student taking chemistry who must color a mole for homework. Chenoweth shared how busy work like this can have a negative effect on students, and explained that having this simple drawing is of no worth in terms of learning, yet it lowered the student's grade in class. However, Miriam Ferzli et al. point out that just because an assignment is time consuming does not give students the right to call an assignment "busy work," which can be seen in the case of lab reports, which are indeed time-consuming but which are also key to learning.

One way to promote productive learning starts in the classroom and then seeps into the homework. Brian Cook and Andrea Babon point to the difference between active and passive learning, noting that active learning promotes engagement and "a deeper approach to learning that enables students to develop meaning from knowledge." Cook and Babon discuss the use of weekly quizzes, which are based on the course readings and which test each student's understanding at the end of each week. Weekly quizzes engage not only students, but also teachers, who must look at what is commonly missed, review students' answers, and clear up any misunderstandings.

Sarah Greenwald and Judy Holdener discuss the rise of online homework and report that "online homework can increase student engagement, and students generally appreciate the immediate feedback offered by online homework systems as well as the ability to have multiple attempts after an incorrect solution." Greenwald and Holdener state that after creating effective homework assignments, teachers must also implement the learning from that homework. Sarah Greenwald and Judy Holdener point to a teacher who uses a two-step homework process of connecting homework to classroom learning by first assigning homework followed by in-class presentations. The teacher says using class time for following up on homework gives that connection to what is learned in the class, noting, "In the initial step students complete and submit (traditional) homework assignments electronically, and then later they revisit their work through presentations of selected problems during class.

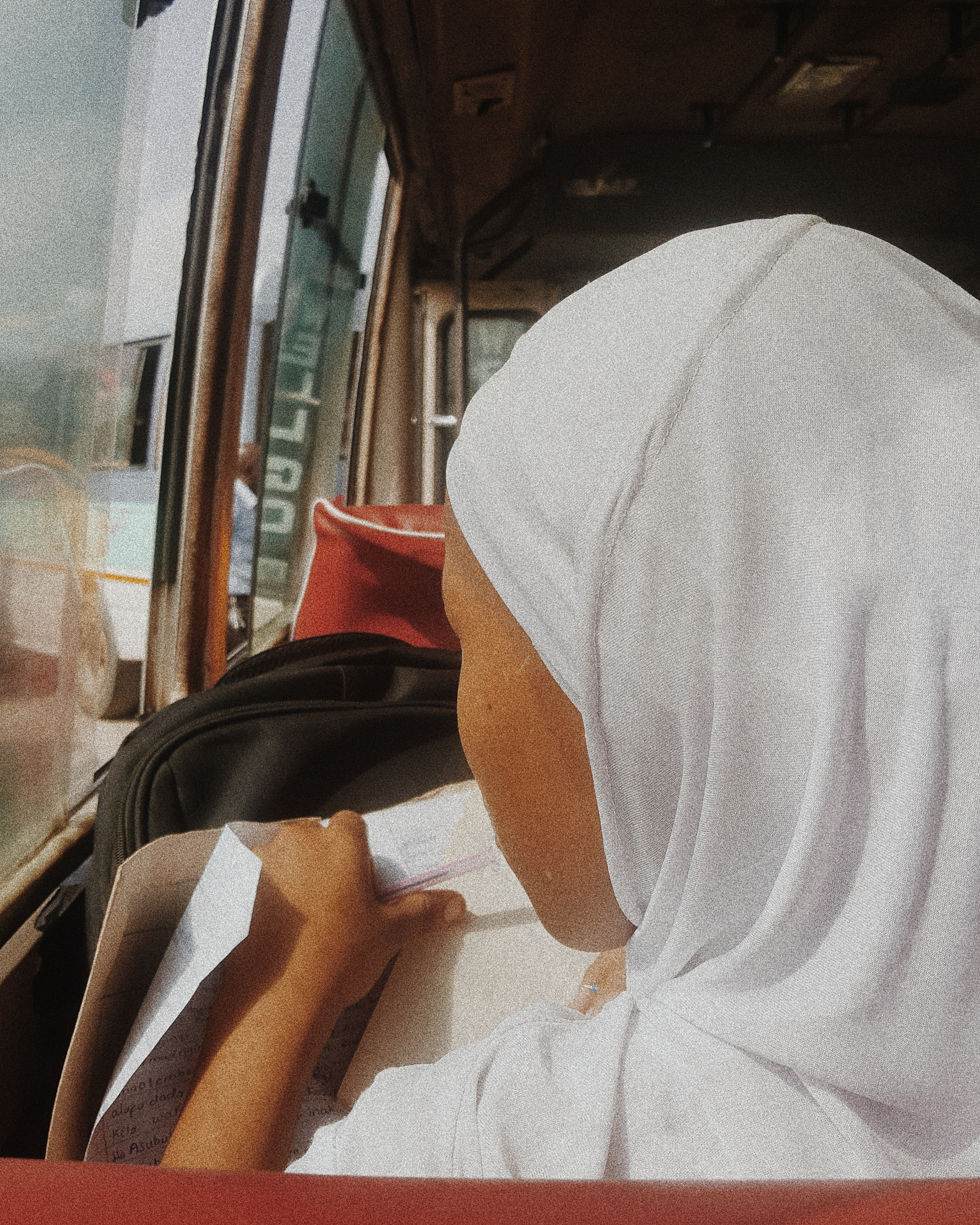
Tanzanian student doing her homework on a school bus before getting home

=== Health and daily life ===
Homework has been identified in numerous studies and articles as a dominant or significant source of stress and anxiety for students. Studies on the relation between homework and health are few compared to studies on academic performance.

A study used survey data to examine relations among homework, student well-being, and behavioral engagement in a sample of 4,317 students from 10 high-performing high schools in upper middle class communities, with these students having an average of more than 3 hours of homework per night. Students who did more hours of homework experienced greater behavioral engagement in school but also physical health problems, more academic stress, and lack of balance in their lives.

A 2007 study of American students by MetLife found that 89% of students felt stressed from homework, with 34% reporting that they "often" or "very often" felt stressed from homework. Stress was especially evident among high school students. Students that reported stress from homework were more likely to be deprived of sleep.

Homework can cause tension and conflict in the home as well as at school, and can reduce students' family and leisure time. In the Cheung & Leung-Ngai (1992) survey, failure to complete homework and low grades where homework was a contributing factor was correlated with greater conflict; some students have reported teachers and parents frequently criticizing their work. In the MetLife study, high school students reported spending more time completing homework than performing home tasks.

=== Time use ===
A University of Michigan Institute for Social Research nationally representative survey of American 15- to 17-year olds, conducted in 2003, found an average of 50 minutes of homework each weekday.

A 2019 Pew Research Center review of Bureau of Labor Statistics' American Time Use Survey data reported that 15-, 16-, and 17-year-old Americans spent on average an hour a day on homework during the school year. The change in this demographic's average daily time spent doing homework (during the school year) increased by about 16 minutes from 2003–2006 to 2014–2017. U.S. teenage girls spent more time doing homework than U.S. teenage boys.

A 2019 nationally representative survey of 95,505 freshmen at U.S. colleges, conducted by the UCLA Higher Education Research Institute, asked respondents, "During your last year in high school, how much time did you spend during a typical week studying/doing homework?" 1.9% of respondents said none, 7.4% said less than one hour, 19.5% said 1–2 hours, 27.9% said 3–5 hours, 21.4% said 6–10 hours, 11.4% said 11–15 hours, 6.0% said 16–20 hours, 4.5% said over 20 hours.

=== Benefits ===
Some educators argue that homework is beneficial to students, as it enhances learning, develops the skills taught in class, and lets educators verify that students comprehend their lessons. Proponents also argue that homework makes it more likely that students will develop and maintain proper study habits that they can use throughout their educational career.

== History ==
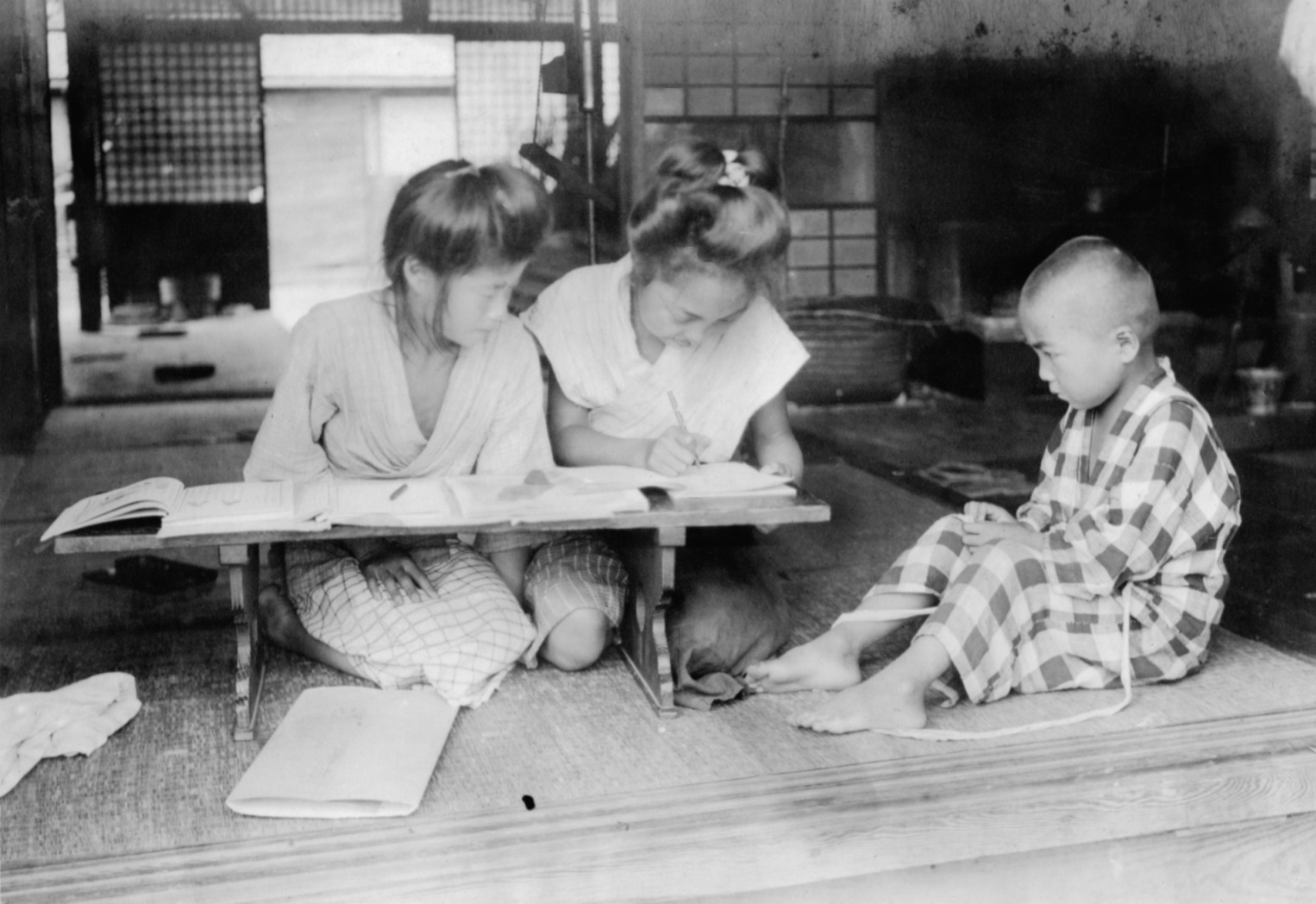
Japanese students doing homework, c. 1915

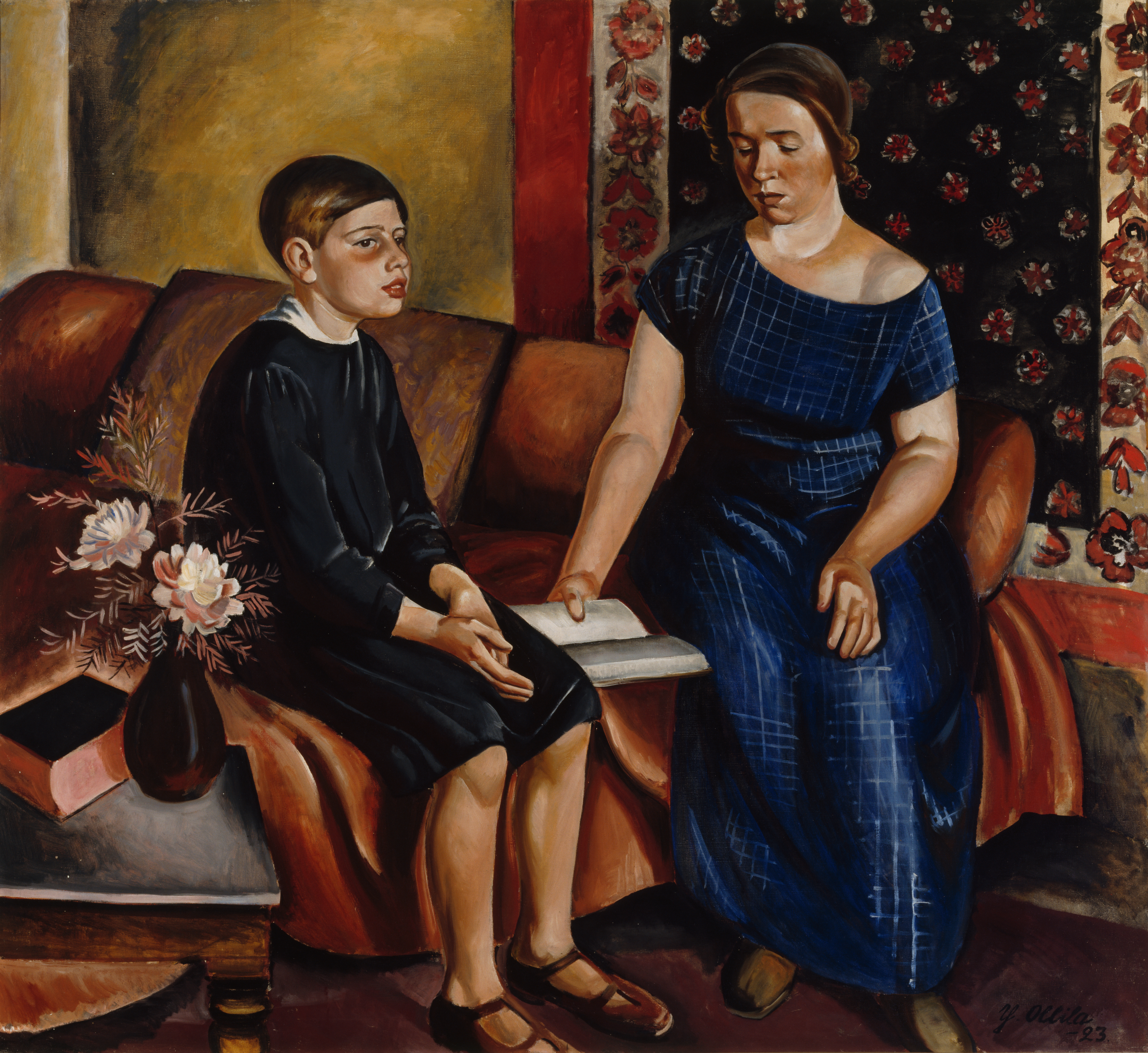
Hearing the Homework; Yrjö Ollila

=== United States ===
Historically, homework was frowned upon in American culture. With few students able to pursue higher education, and with many children and teenagers needing to dedicate significant amounts of time to chores and farm work, homework was disliked not only by parents, but also by some schools. The students' inability to keep up with the homework, which was largely memorizing an assigned text at home, contributed to students dropping out of school at a relatively early age. Attending school was not legally required, and if the student could not spend afternoons and evenings working on homework, then the student could quit school.

Complaints from parents were common at all levels of society. In 1880, Francis Amasa Walker convinced the school board in Boston to prohibit teachers from assigning math homework under normal circumstances. In 1900, journalist Edward Bok railed against schools assigning homework to students until age 15. He encouraged parents to send notes to their children's teachers to demand the end of all homework assignments, and thousands of parents did so. Others looked at the new child labor laws in the United States and noted that school time plus homework exceeded the number of hours that a child would be permitted to work for pay. The campaign resulted in the US Congress receiving testimony to the effect that experts thought children should never have any homework, and that teenagers should be limited to a maximum of two hours of homework per day. In 1901, the California legislature passed an act that effectively abolished homework for anyone under the age of 15. While homework was generally out of favor in the first half of the 20th century, some people supported homework reform, such as by making the assignments more relevant to the students' non-school lives, rather than prohibiting it.

In the 1950s, with increasing pressure on the United States to stay ahead in the Cold War, homework made a resurgence, and children were encouraged to keep up with their Russian counterparts. From that time on, social attitudes have oscillated approximately on a 15-year cycle: homework was encouraged in the 1950s to mid-1960s; it was rejected from the mid-1960s until 1980; it was encouraged again from 1980 and the publication of A Nation at Risk until the mid-1990s, when the Cold War ended. At that time, American schools were overwhelmingly in favor of issuing some homework to students of all grade levels. Homework was less favored after the end of the Cold War.

=== United Kingdom ===
British students get more homework than many other countries in Europe. The weekly average for the subject is 5 hours. The main distinction for UK homework is the social gap, with middle-class teenagers getting a disproportionate amount of homework compared to Asia and Europe.

=== Spain ===
In 2012, a report by the OECD showed that Spanish children spend 6.4 hours a week on homework. This prompted the CEAPA, representing 12,000 Spanish parent associations, to call for a homework strike.

== Criticism ==
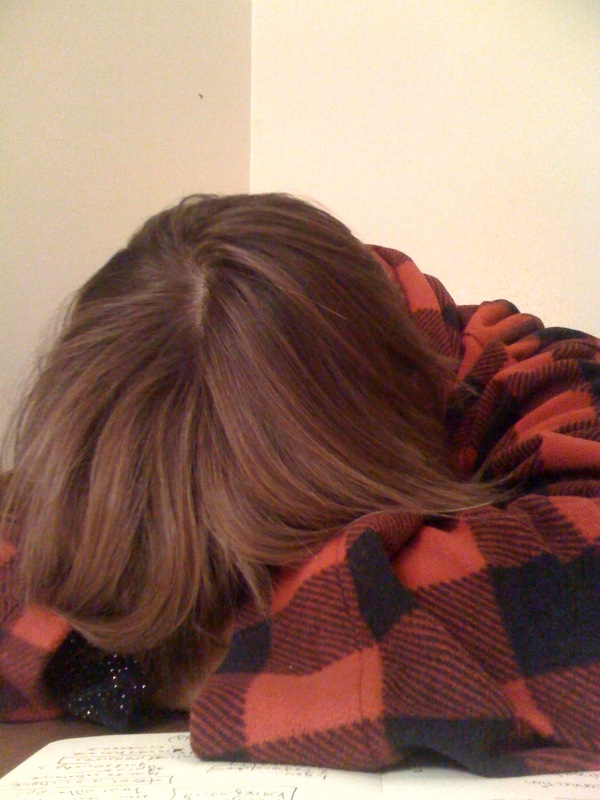
Homework can take up a large portion of a student's free time and lead to stress, despair, anger, and sleep disorders among children, as well as arguments among families.

Homework and its effects, justifications, motivations and alleged benefits have been the subject of sharp criticism among many education experts and researchers.

According to a study by the Dresden University of Technology, homework—described in the study as "an educational ritual"—has little to no influence on academic performance.

When assigning homework, each student is usually given the same exercises, regardless of how well the student is performing. This leaves some students under-challenged and others overwhelmed by their homework. For others, the degree of difficulty of homework may be appropriate, but students are unable to decide for themselves whether they need to deepen their knowledge in a particular subject or whether to use the time in other subjects with which they experience more difficulty, despite the fact that homework is often seen as a way of encouraging self-regulation.

Homework is sometimes used to outsource school material not completed in class to the home, leaving children with homework that is not designed to be done on their own and parents feeling helpless and frustrated. As a consequence, students often have to use the internet or other resources for help, which provides disadvantages for students without internet access. Thus, such homework fails to promote equality of opportunity. Homework without professional feedback from the teacher has little effect on the learning success of students.

Even if it is generally not wanted by homework distributors (unless homework is given as a punishment), completing homework may take up a large part of the student's free time. It is often the case that children procrastinate on doing their homework until late at night, which can lead to sleep disorders and unhealthy stress. Children may feel overwhelmed when they have too much homework, which can negatively affect children's natural curiosity and thirst for knowledge.

A study by the UCL Institute of Education, which concerned the impact of homework in different countries, discovered that the pressure associated with homework causes arguments among family members. The study also showed that homework can lead to anxiety, depression, and emotional exhaustion among children.

== Notes and references ==
=== Works ===
==== Effectiveness of homework ====
- Cooper, Harris; Robinson, Jorgianne C.; Patall, Erika A. (2006). "Does Homework Improve Academic Achievement? A Synthesis of Research, 1987-2003". Review of Educational Research. 76 (1): 1–62. doi:10.3102/00346543076001001. S2CID 146452256.
- Epstein, Joyce L. (1988), "Homework practices, achievements, and behaviors of elementary school students", Center for Research on Elementary and Middle Schools
- Trautwein, Ulrich; Köller, Olaf (2003). "The Relationship Between Homework and Achievement—Still Much of a Mystery". Educational Psychology Review. 15 (2): 115–145. doi:10.1023/A:1023460414243. S2CID 142739222.
- Vazsonyi, Alexander T.; Pickering, Lloyd E. (2003). "The Importance of Family and School Domains in Adolescent Deviance: African American and Caucasian Youth". Journal of Youth and Adolescence. 32 (2): 115–128. doi:10.1023/A:1021857801554. S2CID 142600541.

==== Homework and non-academic effects ====
- Bauwens, Jeanne; Hourcade, Jack J. (1992). "School-Based Sources of Stress Among Elementary and Secondary At-Risk Students". The School Counselor. 40 (2): 97–102.
- Bempechat, Janine (2004). "The Motivational Benefits of Homework: A Social-Cognitive Perspective". Theory into Practice. 43 (3): 189–196. doi:10.1353/tip.2004.0029.
- Cheung, S. K.; Leung-Ngai, J. M. Y. (1992). "Impact of homework stress on children's physical and psychological well-being" (PDF). Journal of the Hong Kong Medical Association. 44 (3): 146–150. Archived (PDF) from the original on 2019-08-13.
- Conner, Jerusha; Pope, Denise; Galloway, Mollie (2009). "Success with Less Stress". Health and Learning. 67 (4): 54–58.
- Galloway, Mollie; Conner, Jerusha; Pope, Denise (2013). "Nonacademic Effects of Homework in Privileged, High-Performing High Schools". The Journal of Experimental Education. 81 (4): 490–510. doi:10.1080/00220973.2012.745469.
- Hardy, Lawrence (2003). "Overburdened, Overwhelmed". American School Board Journal. 190: 18–23.
- Kiewra, Kenneth A; Kaufman, Douglas F.; Hart, Katie; Scoular, Jacqui; Brown, Marissa; Keller, Gwendolyn; Tyler, Becci (2009). "What Parents, Researchers, and the Popular Press Have to Say About Homework". Scholarlypartnershipsedu. 4 (1): 93–109. Archived from the original on 2018-03-16.
- Kouzma, Nadya M.; Kennedy, Gerard A. (2002). "Homework, stress, and mood disturbance in senior high school students". Psychological Reports. 91 (1): 193–198. doi:10.2466/pr0.2002.91.1.193. PMID 12353781. S2CID 19342704.
- Leone, Carla M.; Richards, H. (1989). "Classwork and homework in early adolescence: The ecology of achievement". Journal of Youth and Adolescence. 18 (6): 531–548. doi:10.1007/BF02139072. PMID 24272124. S2CID 508824.
- Markow, Dana; Kim, Amie; Liebman, Margot (2007), The MetLife Survey of the American Teacher: The homework experience (PDF), Metropolitan Life Insurance Foundation, archived from the original (PDF) on 2016-12-20
- Sallee, Buffy; Rigler, Neil (2008). "Doing Our Homework on Homework: How Does Homework Help?". The English Journal. 98 (2): 46–51. doi:10.58680/ej20086828.
- West, Charles K.; Wood, Edward S. (1970). "Academic Pressures on Public School Students". Educational Leadership. 3 (4): 585–589.
- Xu, Jianzhong; Yuan, Ruiping (2003). "Doing homework: Listening to students', parents', and teachers' voices in one urban middle school community". School Community Journal. 13 (2): 25–44. CiteSeerX 10.1.1.471.2773.
- Ystgaard, M. (1997). "Life stress, social support and psychological distress in late adolescence". Social Psychiatry and Psychiatric Epidemiology. 32 (5): 277–283. doi:10.1007/BF00789040. PMID 9257518. S2CID 22716723.

==== Other ====
- Cooper, Harris (2007). The Battle Over Homework: Common Ground for Administrators, Teachers, and Parents (3rd ed.). Thousand Oaks, CA: Corwin Press. ISBN 9781412937139.
- Holt, John (1983). How Children Learn. Reading, MA: Da Capo Press.
- Kohn, Alfie (2006). The Homework Myth. Cambridge, MA: Da Capo Press. ISBN 978-0-7382-1085-8. Chapter 2 Archived 2016-11-05 at the Wayback Machine is free to read.
