= Hearing the Homework =

1923 painting by Yrjö Ollila

- Läksyn kuulustelu (Finnish)
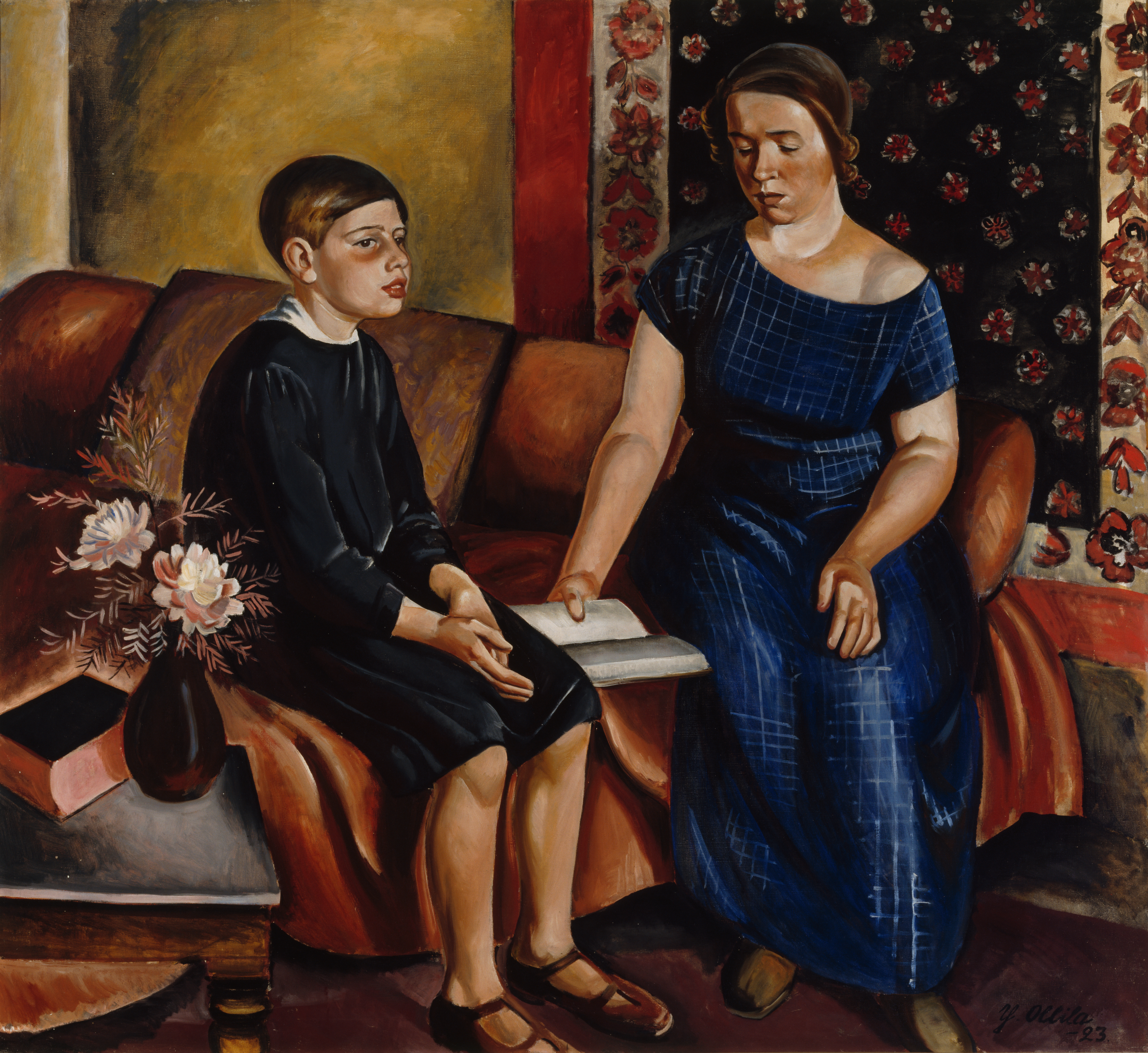
- Artist: Yrjö Ollila
- Year: 1923
- Medium: oil on canvas
- Dimensions: 120 cm × 131 cm (47 in × 52 in)
- Location: Ateneum; Helsinki

Hearing the Homework (Finnish: Läksyn kuulustelu) is a painting by Yrjö Ollila from 1923.

== Description ==
The painting measures 120 by 131 centimetres (47 by 52 inches). It was purchased in 1923 and is at the Ateneum in Helsinki.

== Analysis ==
A schoolboy sits on a couch, as his mother reads a book.
