= Kaarlo af Heurlin =

Finnish politician

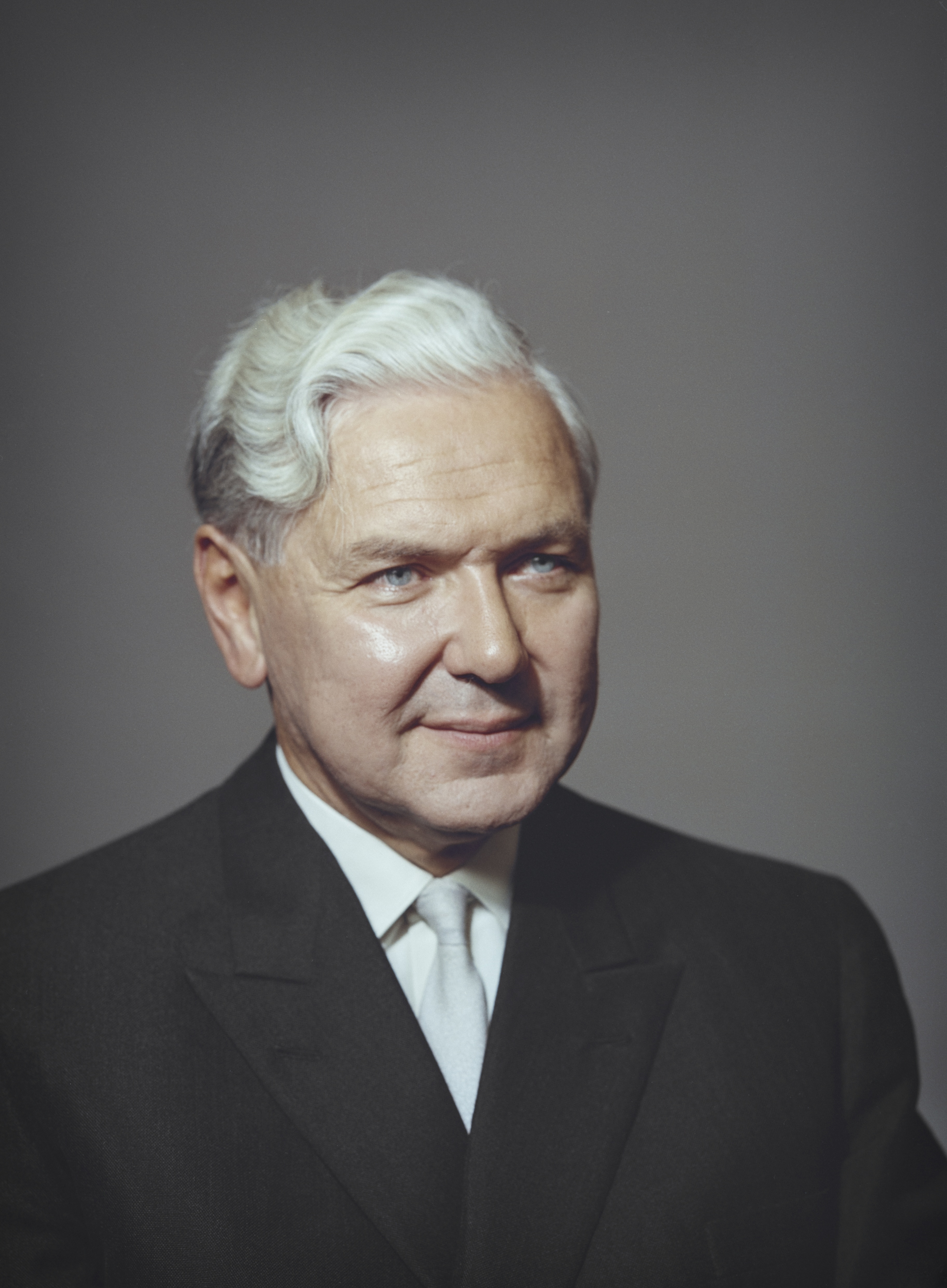
Kaarlo af Heurlin in 1965.

Kaarlo Mauri af Heurlin (30 March 1915, Espoo – 5 February 1985, Helsinki) was a Finnish farmer and politician.

Af Heurlin's parents were Lauri af Heurlin, a law graduate and landowner, and Elli Tompuri, an actress. He was a member of the Parliament of Finland from 1966 to 1970, representing the Social Democratic Party of Finland (SDP).
