= Elli Tompuri =

Finnish actress, director, dancer and author (1880–1962)

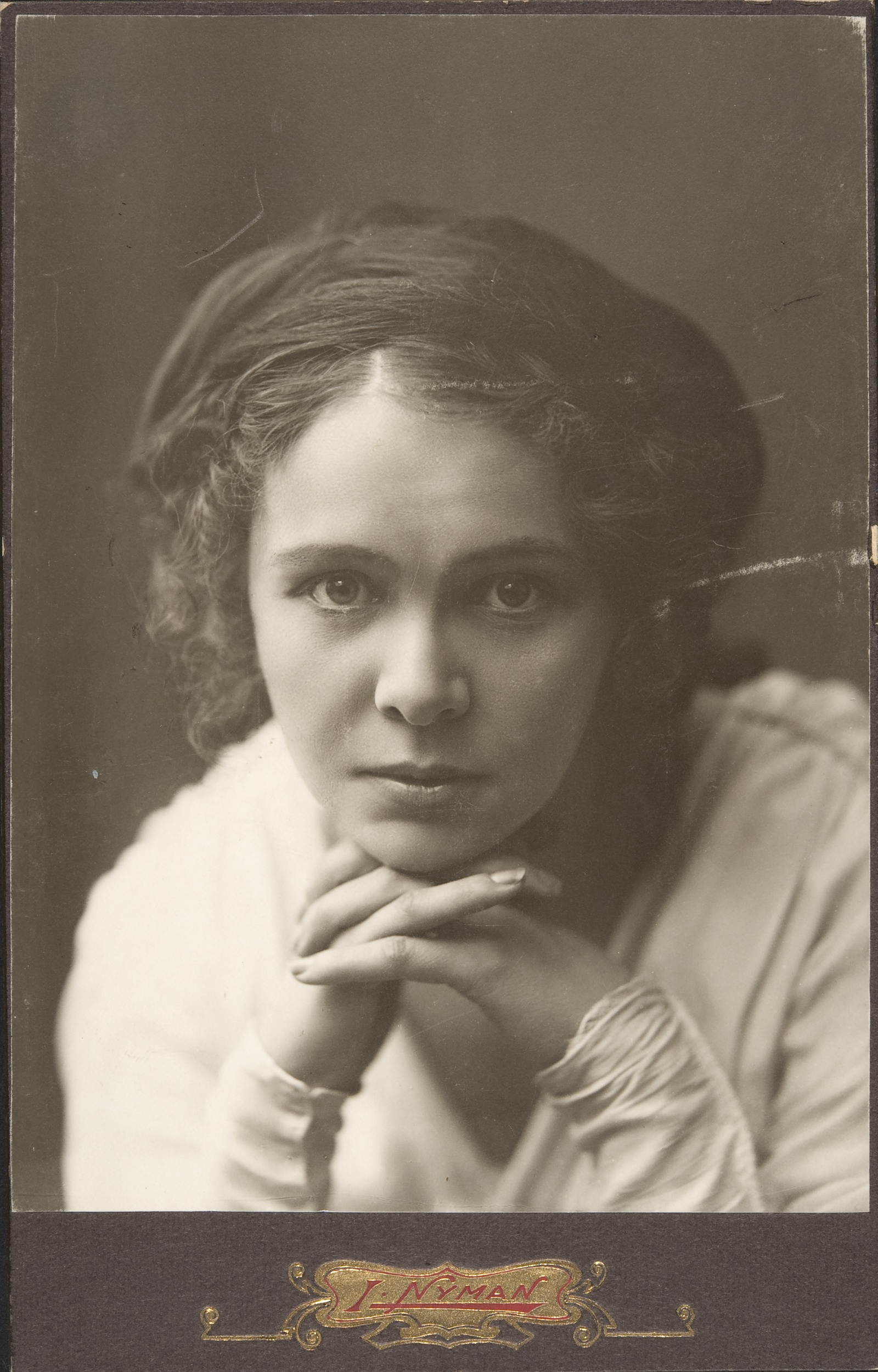
Elli Tompuri (1913)

Elin Hulda Maria Tompuri, known as Elli (20 January 1880, Vehkalahti – 4 February 1962, Helsinki) was a Finnish actress, director, dancer and author.

== Biography ==
Her parents, Jooseppi and Anna Maria were farmers. From 1898, she was a student at the Läroverket för gossar och flickor in Helsinki. In 1900, after a brief period at the University of Helsinki, she became an acting trainee, under the direction of Kaarlo Bergbom, at what is now the Finnish National Theatre. She was also engaged at the Swedish Theatre from 1903 to 1904, and was a director at the Tampere Theatre from 1905 to 1906.

Her breakthrough came at the National Theatre in 1905, when she played the title role in Salome by Oscar Wilde. Her other notable roles were in Anna Liisa, by Minna Canth, and as Nora in A Doll's House, by Henrik Ibsen. From 1908 to 1910, she appeared in Berlin, at the Lessing Theatre. When she returned to Finland, she worked as a free agent and formed her own theatrical troupe. Once, she played the title role in Hamlet.

From 1910 to 1919, she was married to the bank manager, Lauri af Heurlin. They had two sons; Lauri, a Professor of Economics, and Kaarlo, a farmer who served in the Parliament of Finland from 1966 to 1970.

In 1919, together with the artist, Yrjö Ollila, she created the "Vapaa Näyttämö" (Free Stage), which would be devoted to supporting the newer playwrights, but it went bankrupt in a year. In the 1930s, she became known as the "punaisena diivana" (Red Diva) for performing works by writers who had been banned in Germany. This earned her the attention of the Central Police. She was generally considered to be rather eccentric, but served as an inspiration for several poets, such as Eino Leino and Bertel Gripenberg.

In the 1940s and 50s, she wrote eight volumes of memoirs. She was awarded the "Pro-Finlandia Medal" of the Order of the Lion of Finland in 1961.

== Selected works ==
- Voices from Finland: an anthology of Finland's verse and prose in English, Finnish and Swedish, edited by Elli Tompuri. Helsinki: Sanoma, 1947
- Etu- ja taka- ja syrjähyppyjä: muistelmia Arkadiasta Kansalliseen, (Front and rear and side jumps: memoirs from Arcadia to National), WSOY, 1952
- Myrskylinnun tie: Elli Tompurin muistelemaa {Stormbird Road: Remembered by Elli Tompuri), Ritva Heikkilä and Marianna Laurson (Eds.), WSOY, 1980 ISBN 951-0-10156-7
