= Yrjö Ollila =

Finnish Impressionist painter, designer and muralist(1887–1932)

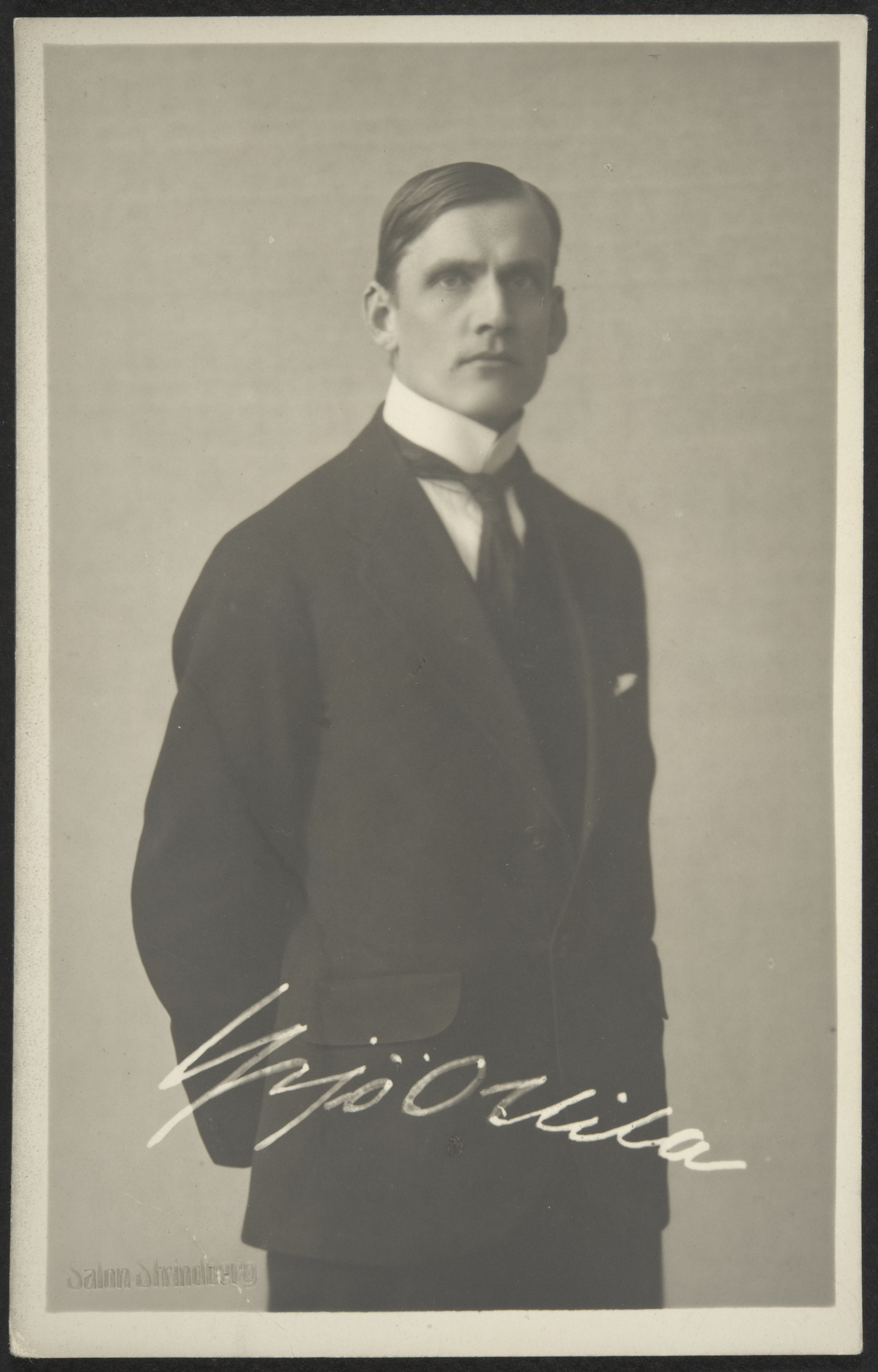
Yrjö Ollila (c. 1920), from the archives of The Finnish Heritage Agency.

Yrjö Aleksanteri Ollila (20 July 1887, Helsinki – 14 November 1932, Helsinki) was a Finnish Impressionist painter, designer and muralist.

== Biography ==
Ollila's parents emigrated to America after the death of his older brothers, and the decorative painter, Alex Rapp, became his guardian. From 1903 to 1906, he studied at the drawing school of the "Finnish Art Society" and later went to Paris on a state scholarship. In 1912, he joined "Septem-ryhmä" (The Septem Group), an association of French-influenced Impressionist artists that advocated the use of pure colors. Its other members included Willy Finch and Magnus Enckell.

In 1919, he and the actress Elli Tompuri attempted to establish a theater that would highlight the newer playwrights, but it went bankrupt a year later and he moved his family to France, where he lived for seven years. While there, he created movie posters, wallpaper patterns and designs for toys as well as doing set designs. His wife, Lylli, who was also a painter, made artificial flowers and designed funeral wreaths.

In 1927, Ollila and a businessman named Uuno Sinervä founded the "Helsingin taidevärjäämö" (Helsinki Art Dye-Works), a firm devoted to creating designer fabrics. In addition to his designs, he helped develop new technology for the dyeing process, but left the company in 1929 because he was overwhelmed with work from other commitments.

In addition to his canvases and set design work, he did murals for several buildings, including the elementary school on Tehtaankatu Street (1914) and the Eira branch of the Kansallis-Osake-Pankki (1927). He also did an altarpiece depicting the Crucifixion for a church in Kontiolahti (1929); considered a good example of his later Post-Impressionistic style. His last work was a mural for the Finnish National Theatre in 1932. His death was attributed to poisoning from the various dyes and pigments he had been exposed to. He is buried in the Hietaniemi Cemetery in Helsinki.

== Selected paintings ==
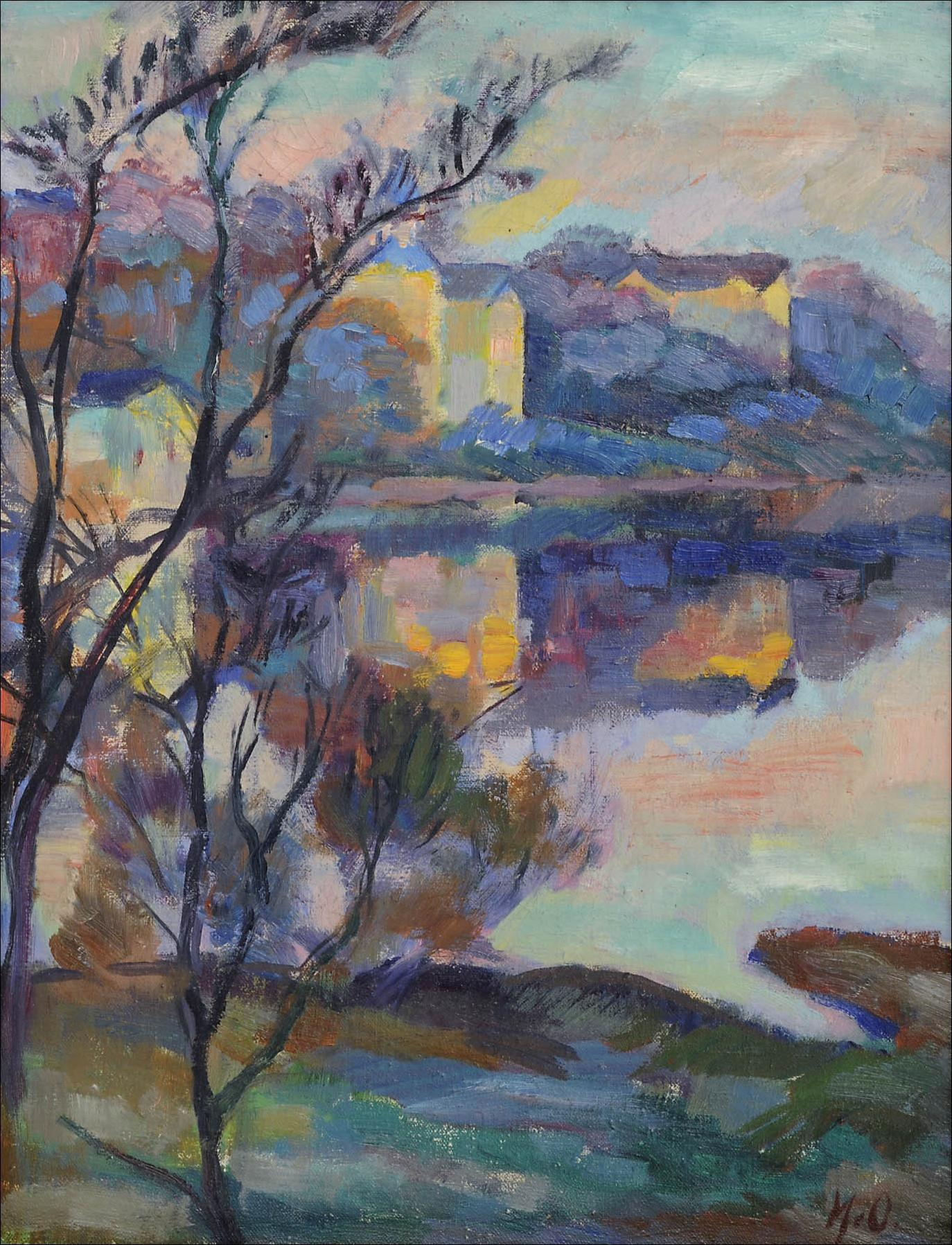
Break of Dawn

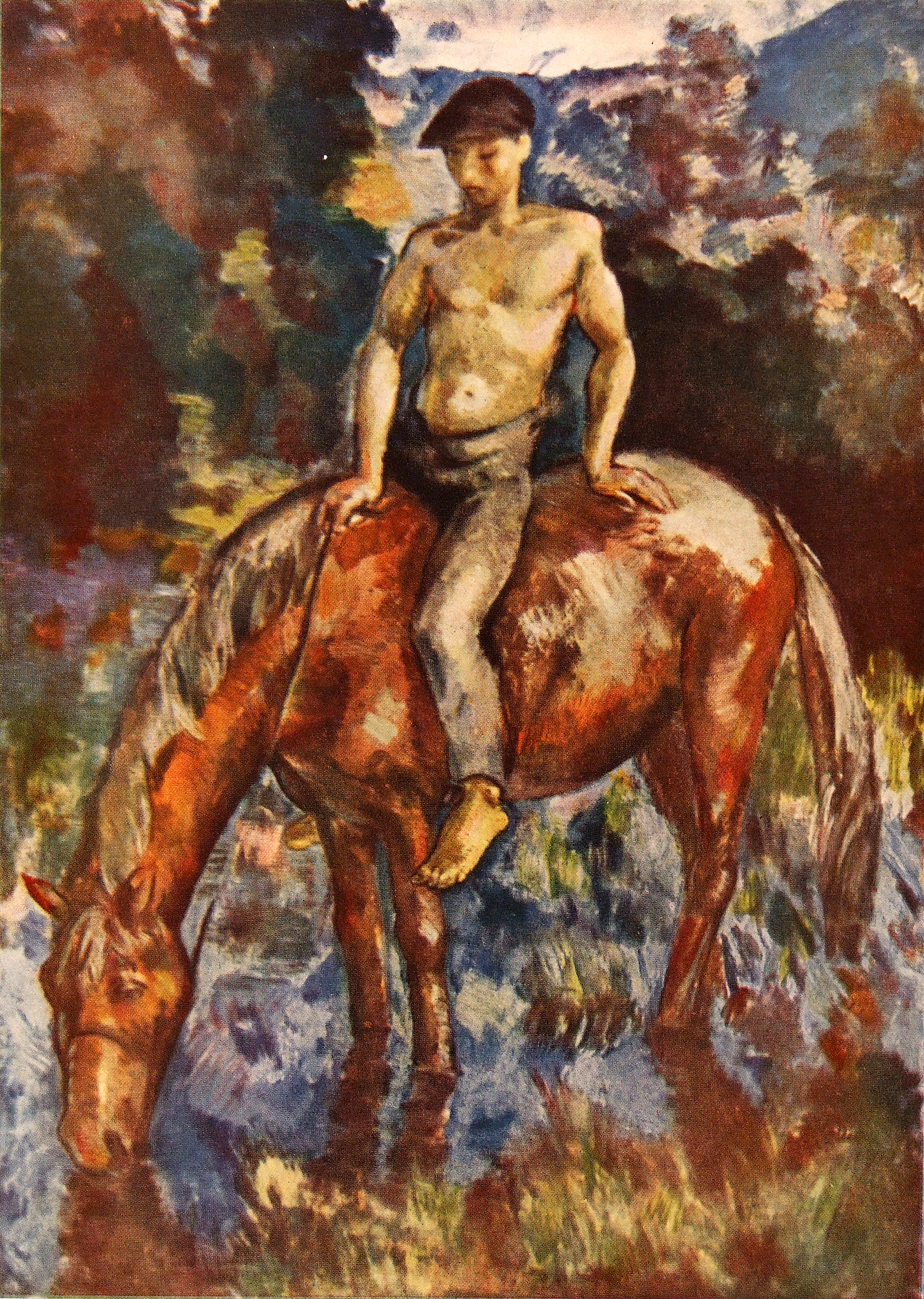
Watering a Horse

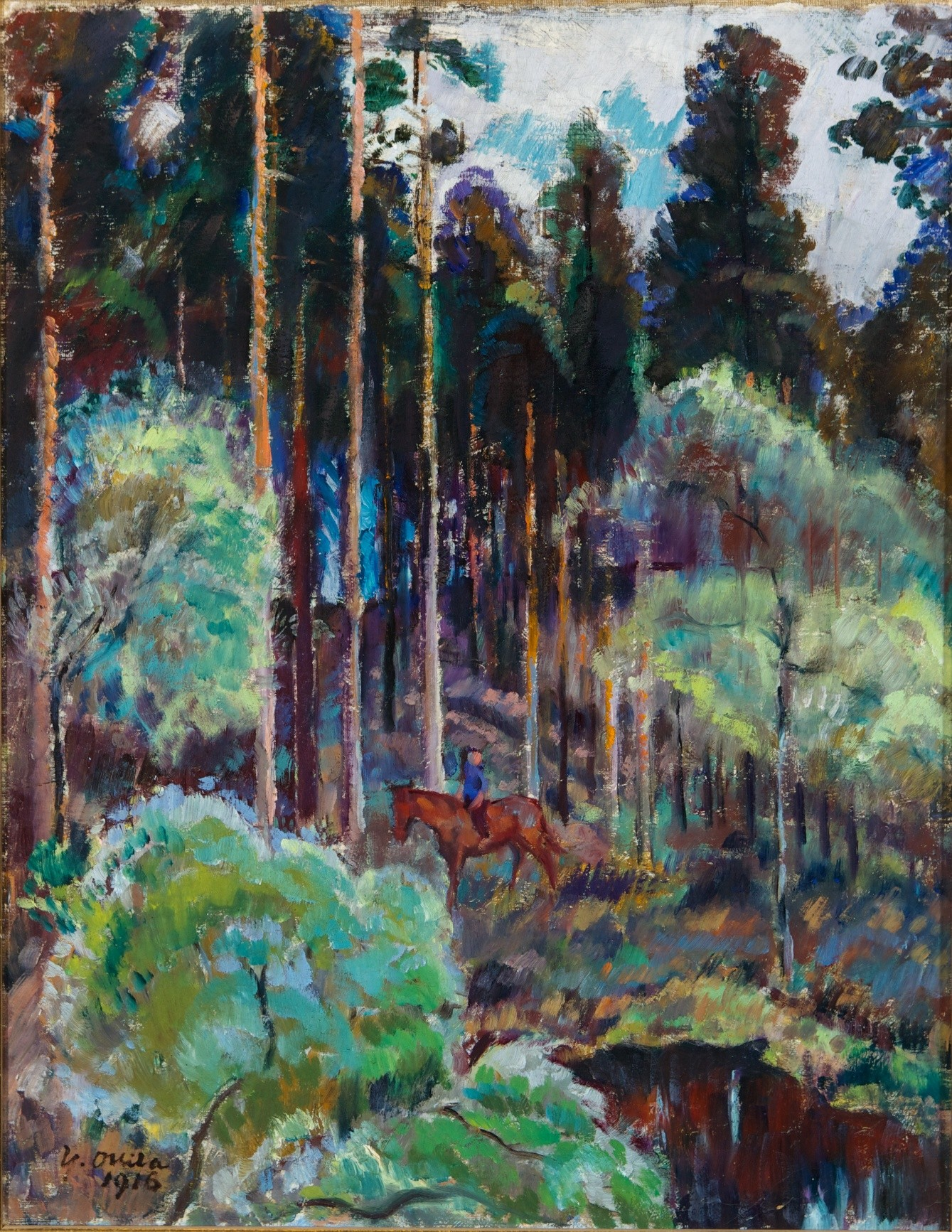
Forest Scene

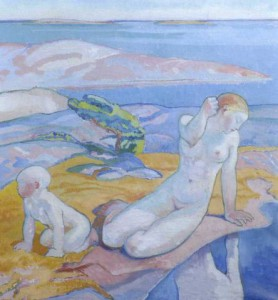
A Decoration
